= SAIC-GM-Wuling =

Chinese automobile manufacturer and joint venture

SAIC-GM-Wuling Automobile Co., Ltd.
- Logo since 2025
- Native name: 上汽通用五菱汽车股份有限公司
- Type: Joint venture
- Industry: Automotive
- Founded: 18 November 2002; 23 years ago
- Headquarters: Liuzhou, Guangxi, China
- Area served: China; Southeast Asia
- Key people: Lu Juncheng (general manager)
- Products: Automobiles; Microvans
- Production output: ▲1,540,077 vehicles (2024)
- Brands: Baojun; Huajing; Wuling
- Owners: SAIC Motor (50.1%); General Motors (44%); Guangxi Auto (5.9%)
- Number of employees: 20,000
- Subsidiaries: SGMW Indonesia
- Website: sgmw.com.cn

SAIC-GM-Wuling Automobile Co., Ltd. (Chinese: 上汽通用五菱汽车股份有限公司, abbreviated as SGMW) is a joint venture between SAIC Motor, General Motors, and Guangxi Auto (previously Wuling Group). Based in Liuzhou, Guangxi in southwestern China, it produces passenger and commercial vehicles sold in China under the Wuling and Baojun brands.

Founded in 2002, SGMW became well known for manufacturing microvans, which are especially popular in China's less affluent regions. Since 2017, SGMW has operated a manufacturing and sales subsidiary in Indonesia, known as SGMW Motor Indonesia. The company also manufactures vehicles in China for export under the Chevrolet brand for General Motors.

Both SGMW and Liuzhou Wuling Automobile Industry Co. Ltd. use the Wuling brand name and the five-diamond "W" logo.

== History ==
Logo of SGMW until 2025

In 2002, the joint venture SAIC-GM-Wuling was established, with SAIC holding 50.1% of the shares, General Motors 34%, and Wuling Group (later renamed Guangxi Auto) 15.9%. Wuling transferred its microvan and small truck production to the joint venture. By 2011, GM increased its ownership stake to 44%, reducing Wuling's share to 5.9%.

In 2005, SGMW acquired Etsong Vehicle Manufacturing, a small-scale manufacturing company in Qingdao, China. This factory, originally established in 1997 by a tobacco company, was later owned by FAW Jiefang before being acquired by the SAIC group. The factory had previously produced Austin Maestro/Montego derivatives under the Etsong Lubao and Etsong Lande brands. After SGMW's acquisition, production of these models ceased, and the facility was repurposed to expand SGMW's mini-vehicle capacity.

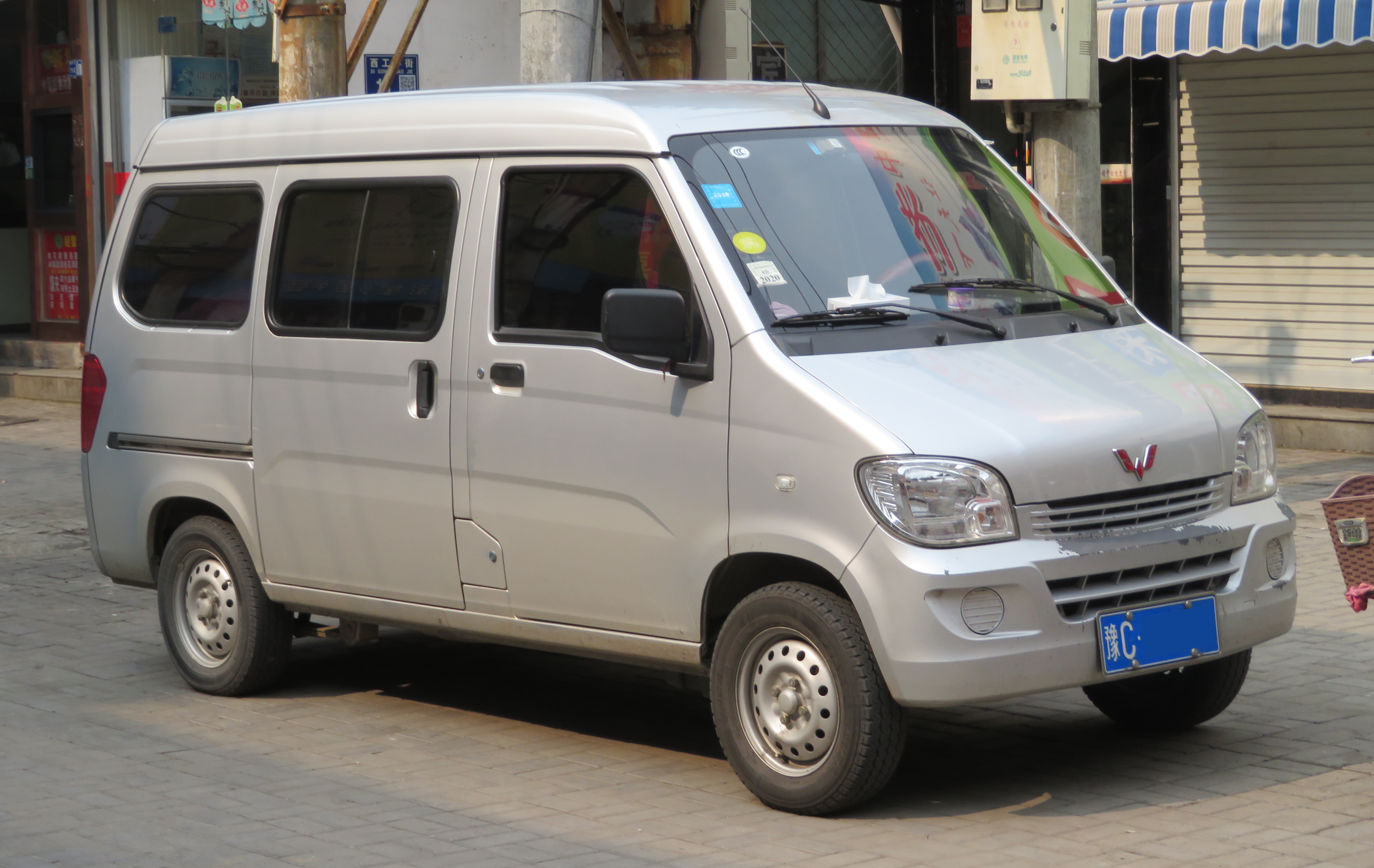
Wuling Sunshine

SGMW became significant mass-volume vehicle producer in China's interior. In 2011, the company sold 1,286,000 vehicles domestically, with sales increasing to 1,445,000 in 2012. Its vehicle offerings are priced between $5,000 and $10,000, catering to budget-conscious consumers. SGMW is also one of China's leading manufacturers of microvans, known locally as xiao mianbao che (小面包车), or "small bread box cars." These compact commercial vehicles, comparable in size to a compact car, have been particularly successful in the country's less affluent interior regions. Among its popular models, the Wuling Sunshine stood out, selling over 450,000 units annually at its peak. At that time, SGMW has claimed that no other model in China surpasses the Wuling Sunshine in sales volume. In late 2012, SGMW inaugurated a new factory in Liuzhou, Guangxi Zhuang Autonomous Region, with an annual production capacity of 400,000 Baojun passenger cars. A powertrain factory with equal capacity was also under construction.

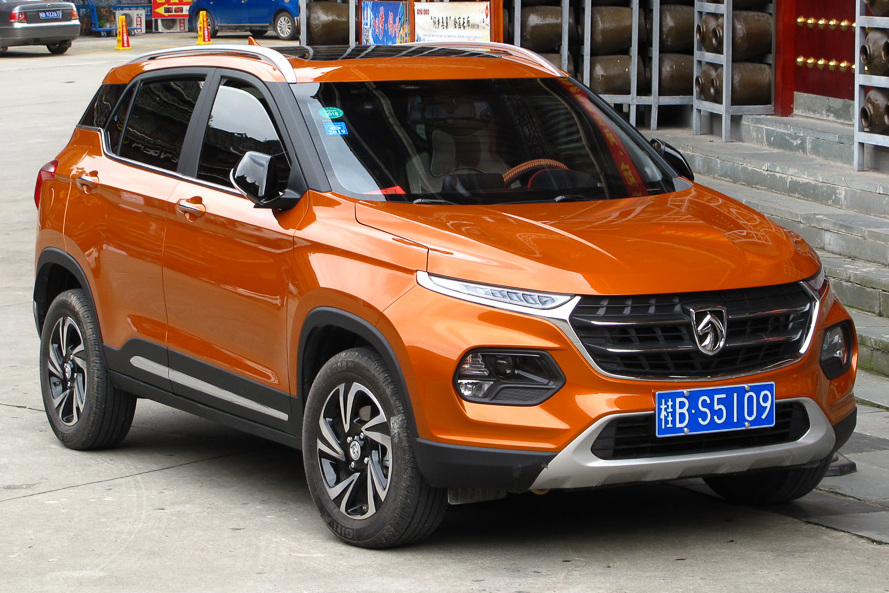
SGMW sold over 700,000 Baojun 510 in two years.

In 2010, SGMW launched the Baojun brand to compete with domestic Chinese automakers. Focusing on passenger vehicles, it targeted consumers in third- and fourth-tier Chinese cities, which are medium- and large-sized cities outside the top four in terms of population or GDP contribution. Its first product is the Baojun Lechi, based on the Chevrolet Spark/Daewoo Matiz M150. In 2012, Baojun introduced the 630, a small four-door sedan. In 2016, Baojun sold 688,390 vehicles, with sales increasing to 996,629 in 2017, largely driven by the success of the Baojun 510 SUV. The 510 became the best-selling crossover in China in 2018, with nearly 800,000 units sold by June 2019. Despite early success, Baojun's sales declined in subsequent years. In 2019, the brand launched the "New Baojun" strategy with modern designs and higher-end models, but it failed to boost demand, leading to several model discontinuations. Consequently, Wuling largely took over Baojun's role in affordable passenger vehicles.

In 2015, SGMW began building its first overseas manufacturing facility in Cikarang, Indonesia, within the Greenland International Industrial Center. Spanning 600,000 m^{2}, the facility was designed to produce vehicles for the Indonesian market and export to Southeast Asia, with a $700 million investment and a production capacity of 150,000 vehicles annually. The plant started operations in July 2017, producing the Confero MPV, and by the end of 2017, Wuling Motors had ranked among the top 10 automotive brands in Indonesia.

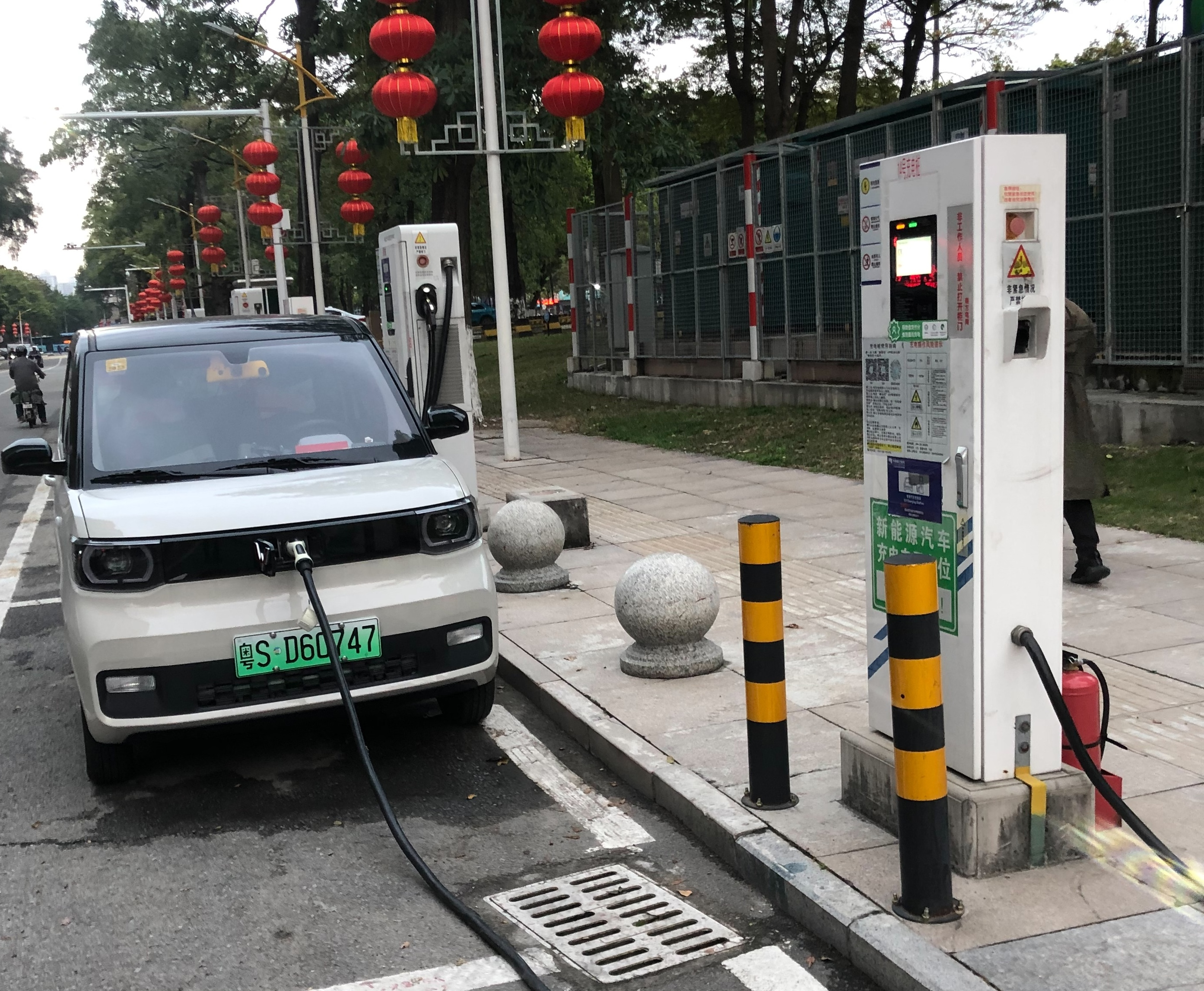
Wuling Hongguang Mini EV

In 2020, SGMW transitioned to electric vehicle production with the launch of the Wuling Hongguang Mini EV, a small battery electric city car. The vehicle began retail deliveries in China in July 2020. Priced starting at around US$4,200, the Hongguang Mini EV became one of the most affordable electric cars in the market. In 2020, it sold 119,255 units, ranking as the second-best-selling plug-in electric car globally. In January 2021, the Hongguang Mini EV topped new energy vehicle sales in China with 25,778 units, surpassing the Tesla Model 3. By February 2023, global sales had surpassed 1.1 million units, making it the best-selling electric car in China. By 2023, SGMW's Baojun brand shifted entirely to electrification, introducing plug-in hybrid and electric models.

In September 2024, SGMW unveiled its first vehicle not affiliated with any of its sub-brands, called the SGMW Light of ASEAN Concept.

== Current products ==
=== Wuling ===
Since 2020, SAIC-GM-Wuling has categorized its vehicle models into "Red Badge" and "Silver Badge." The "Red Badge" models are primarily designed for light commercial or entry-level passenger vehicles, while the "Silver Badge" models are used for more premium passenger cars in global markets.

==== Silver Badge ====
- Hongguang Mini EV / Macaron EV / Aira EV (2020–present), city car, BEV
- Kaijie/Victory (2020–present), mid-size MPV, ICE/HEV
- Xingyun (2023–present), compact SUV, HEV
- Air EV (2022–present), city car, BEV
- Binguo/Bingo (2023–present), subcompact car, BEV
- Binguo Plus (2024–present), subcompact SUV, BEV
- Binguo S (2025–present), subcompact SUV, BEV
- Binguo Pro (2026–present), subcompact car, BEV
- Xingchi/Alvez (2022–present), subcompact SUV
- Xingchen/Asta (2021–present), compact SUV, ICE/HEV
- Xingguang/Starlight (2023–present), mid-size sedan, PHEV/BEV
- Xingguang S (2024–present), compact SUV, PHEV/BEV
- Xingguang L (2026–present), mid-size SUV, PHEV
- Xingguang M (2027–present), full-size MPV, PHEV
- Xingguang 730 / Darion / Starlight Darion (2025–present), mid-size MPV, ICE/PHEV/BEV
- Xingguang 560 / Eksion (2026–present), compact SUV, ICE/PHEV/BEV
- Jiachen (2022–present), compact MPV
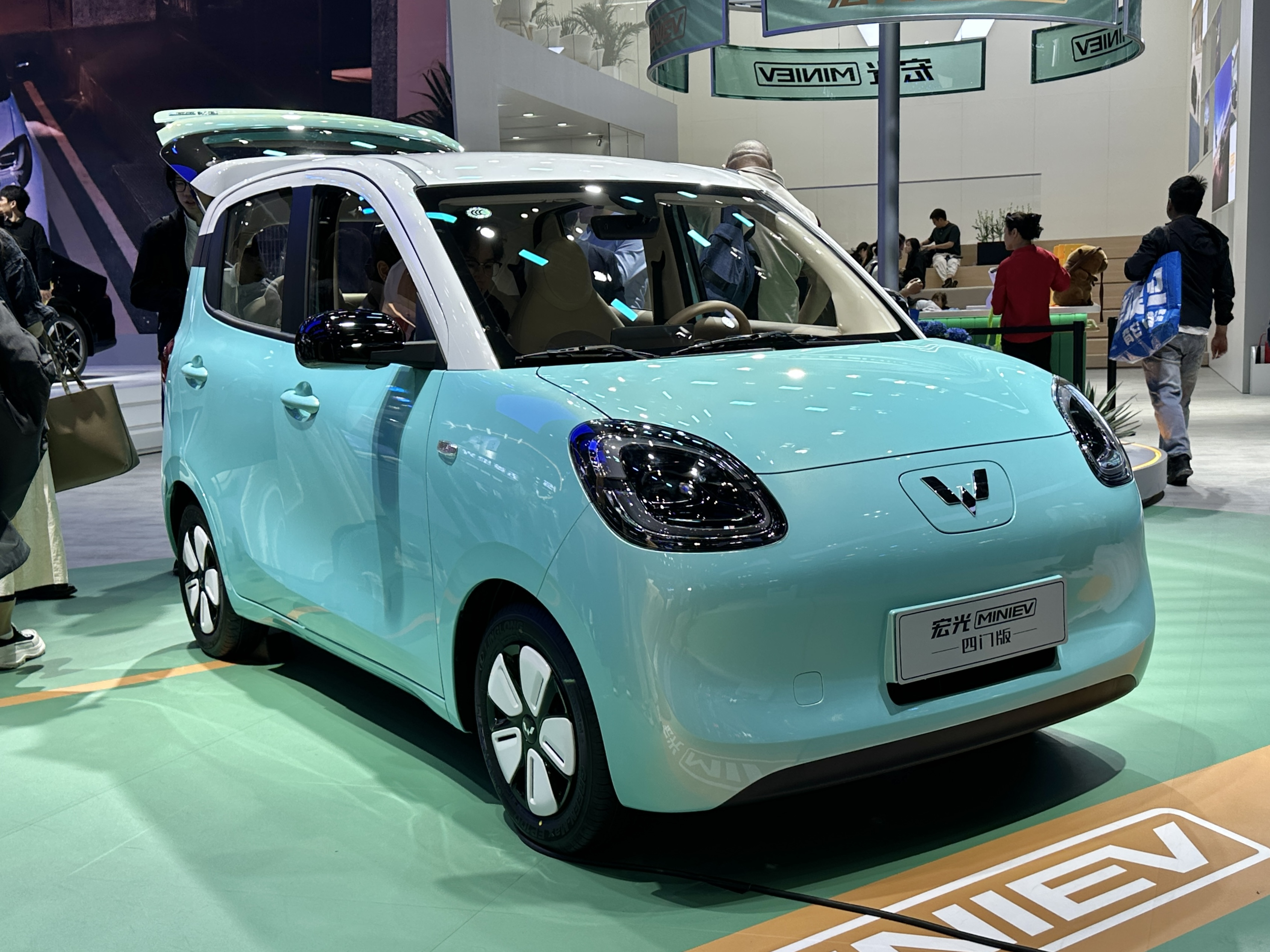
Hongguang Mini EV

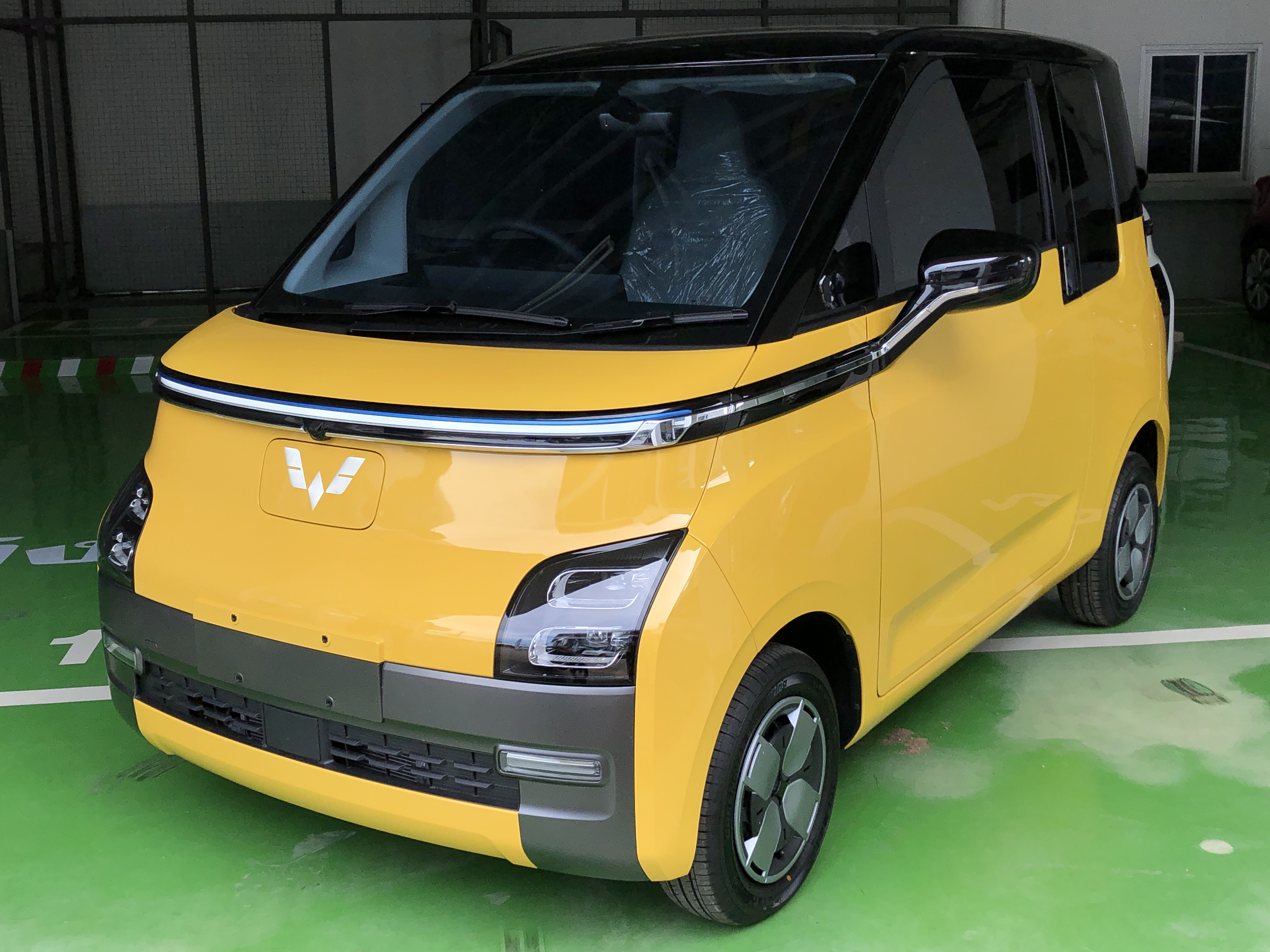
Air EV

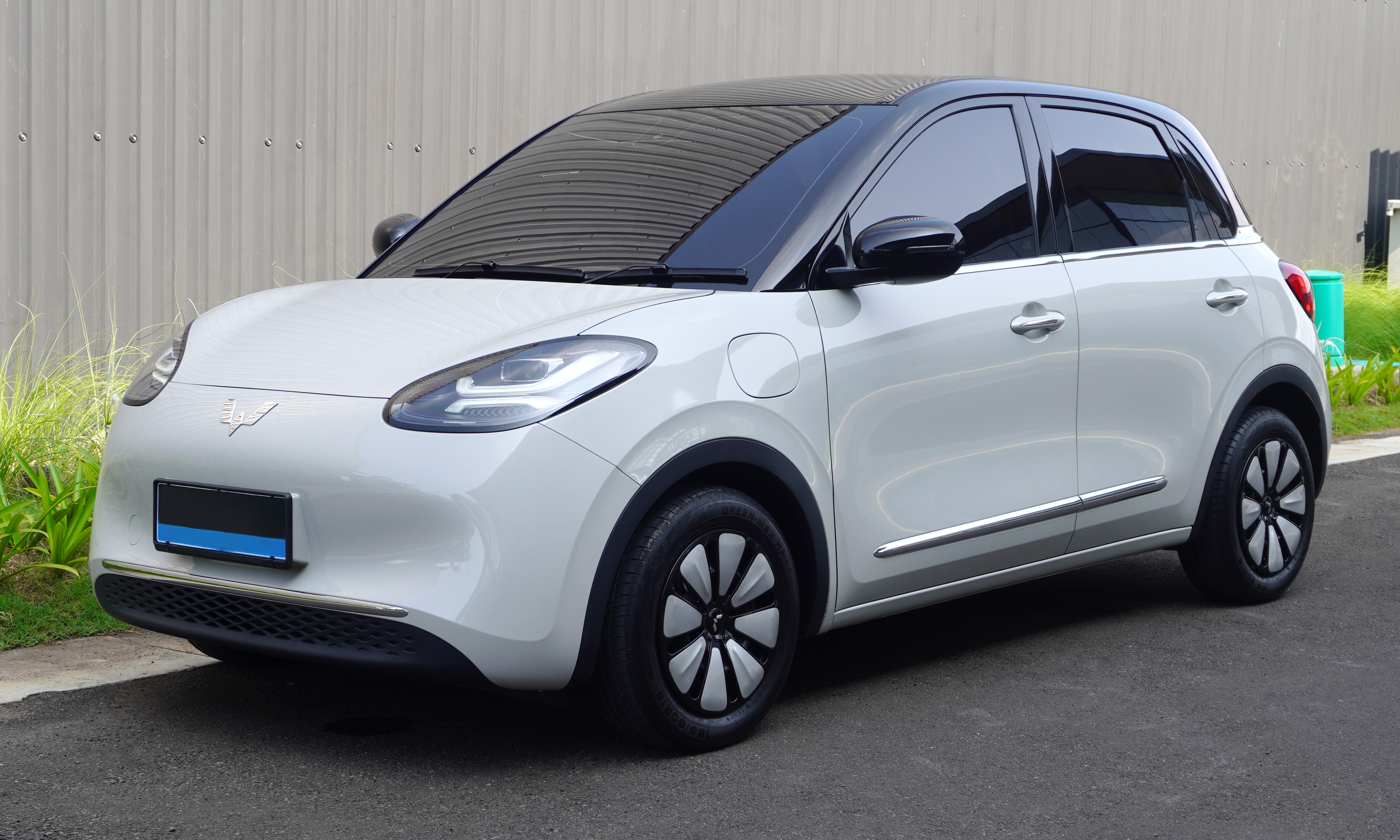
Binguo

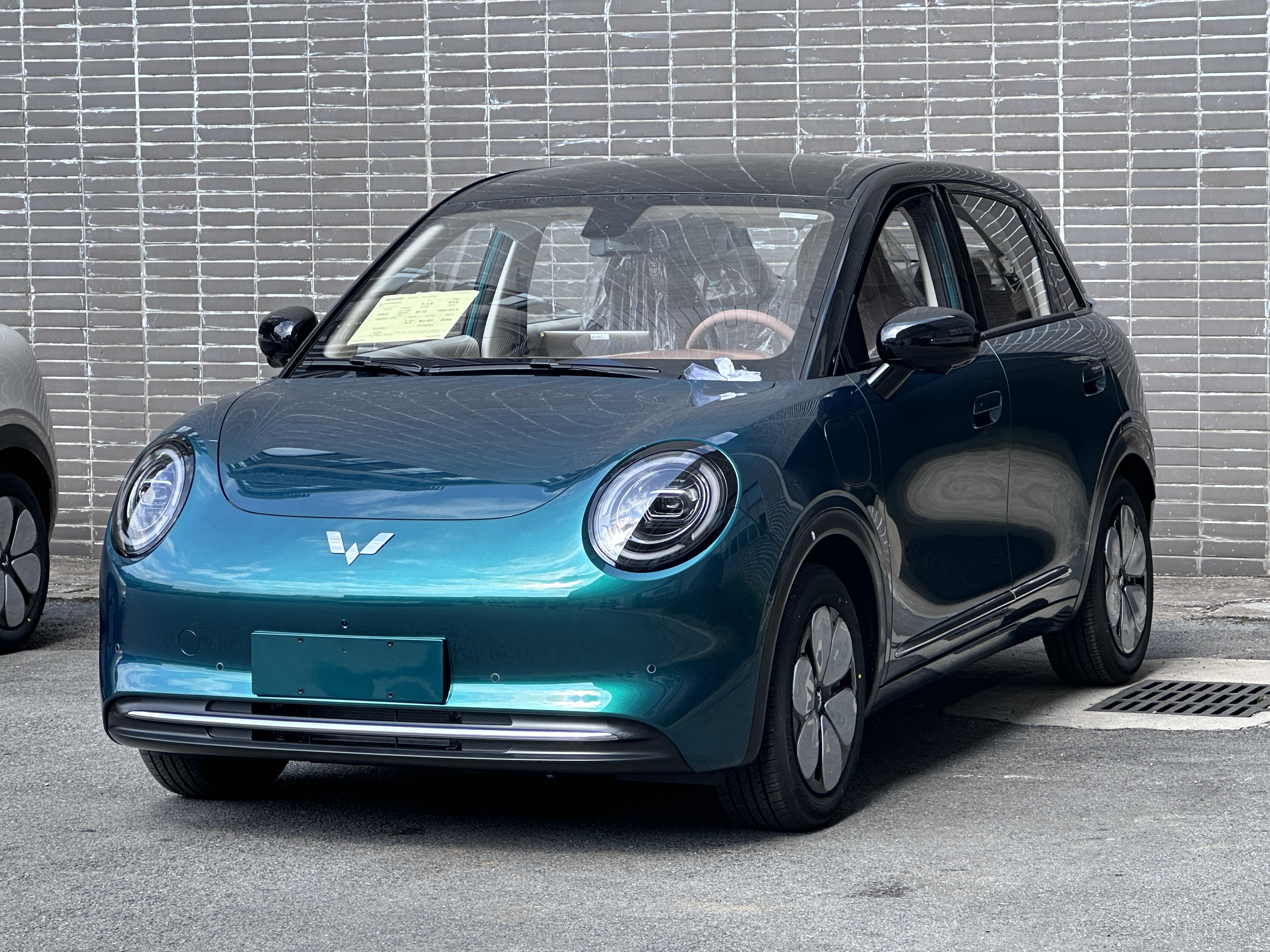
Binguo Pro

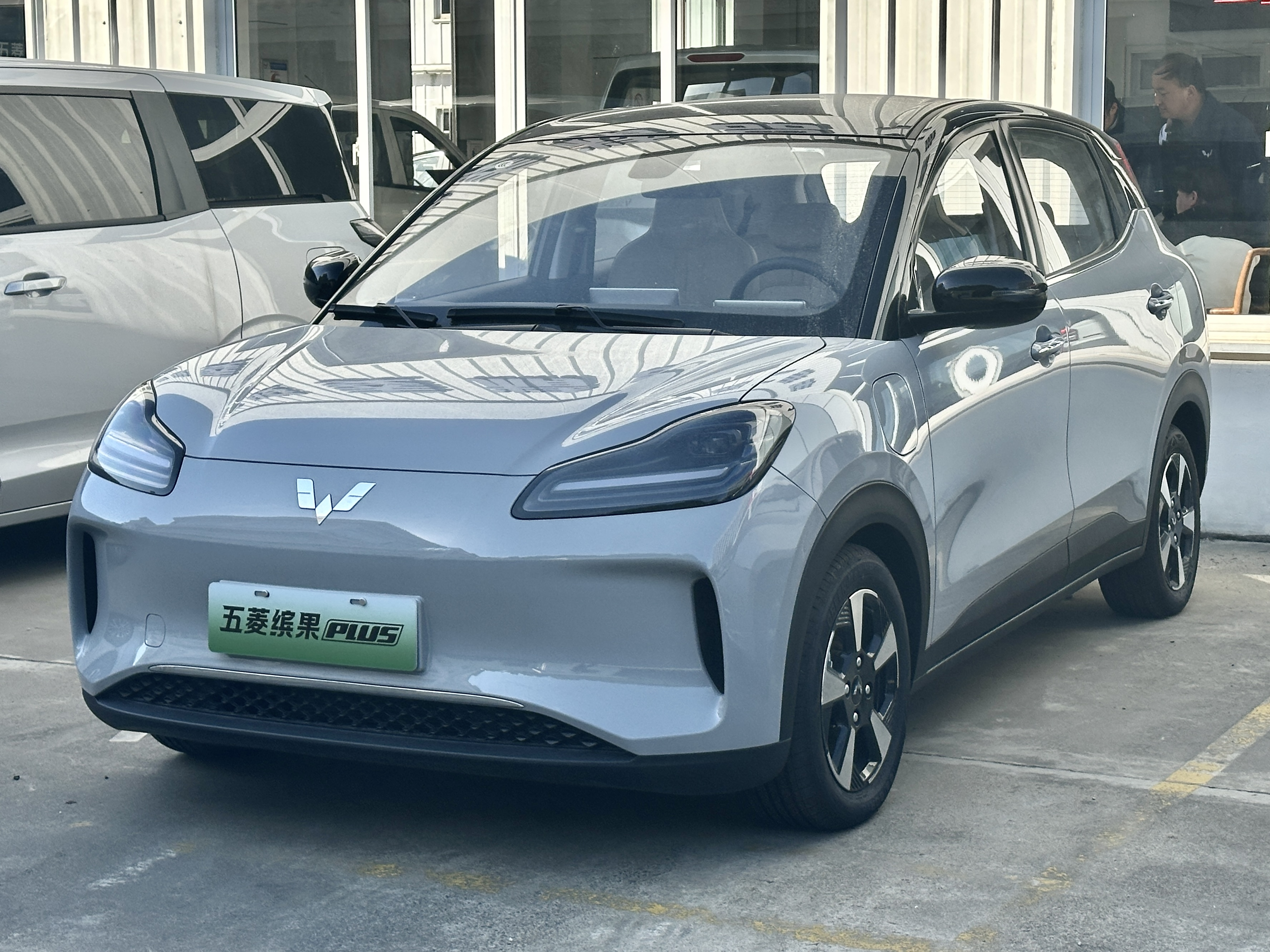
Binguo Plus

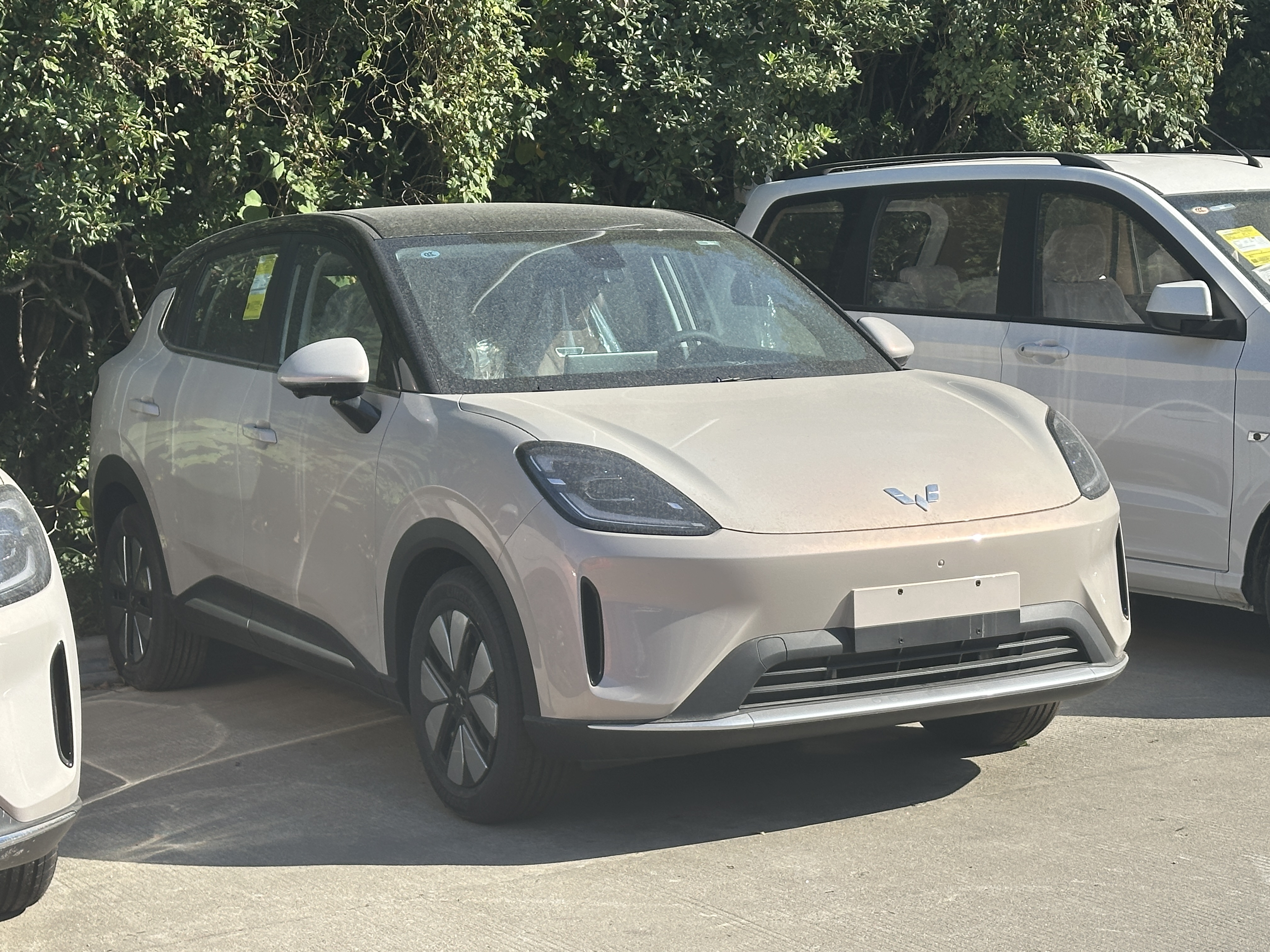
Binguo S

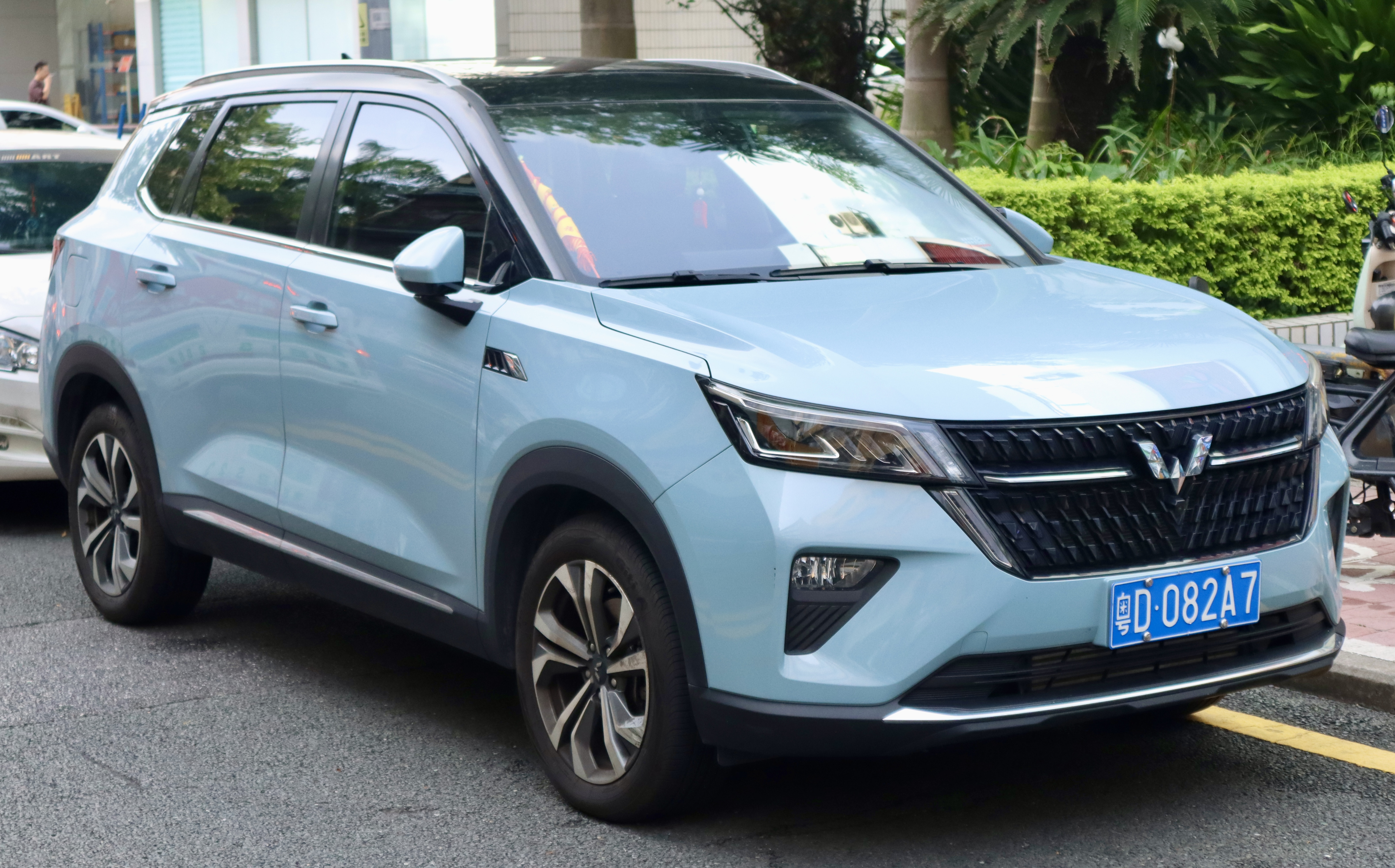
Xingchen (Asta)

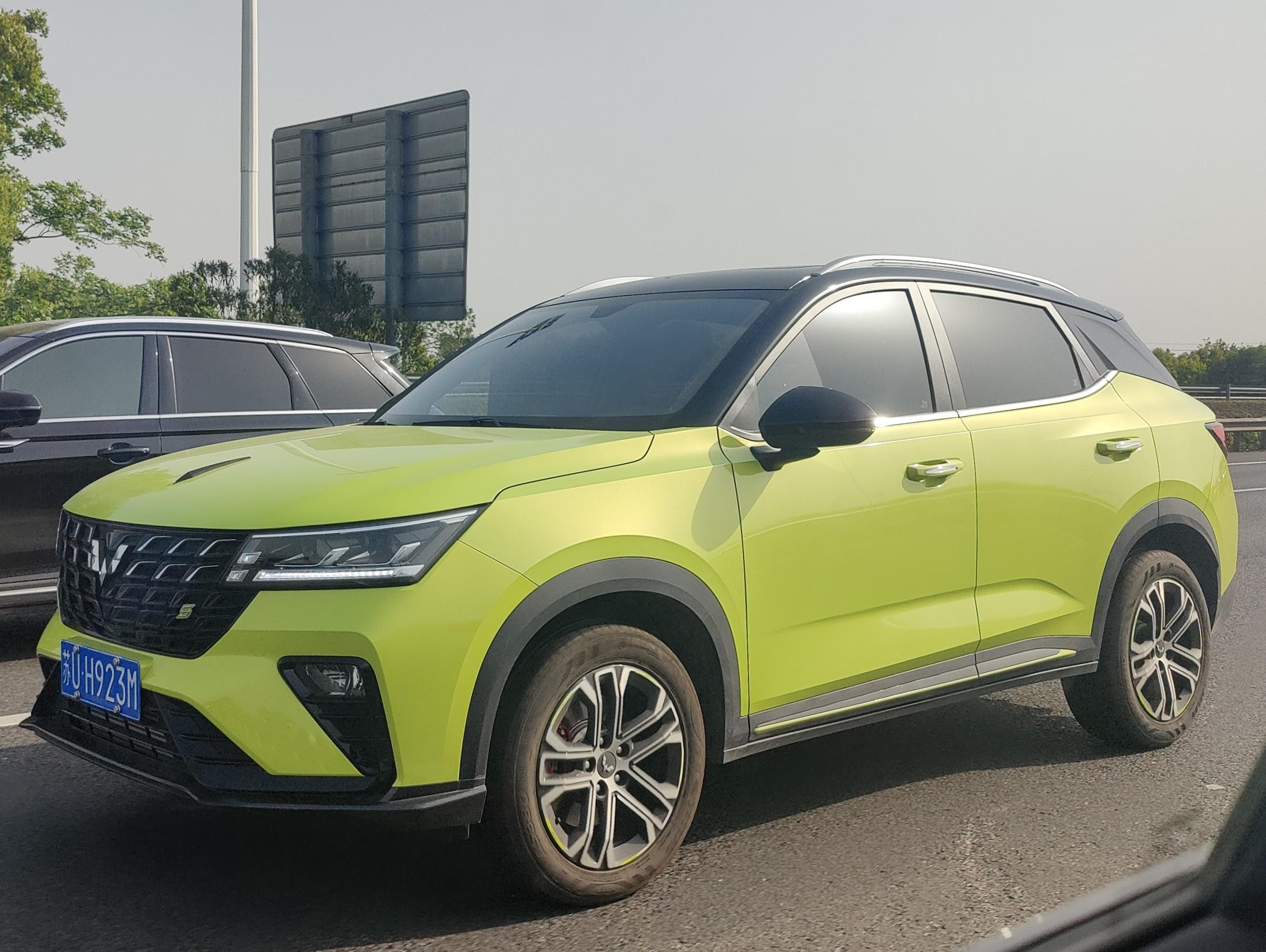
Xingchi

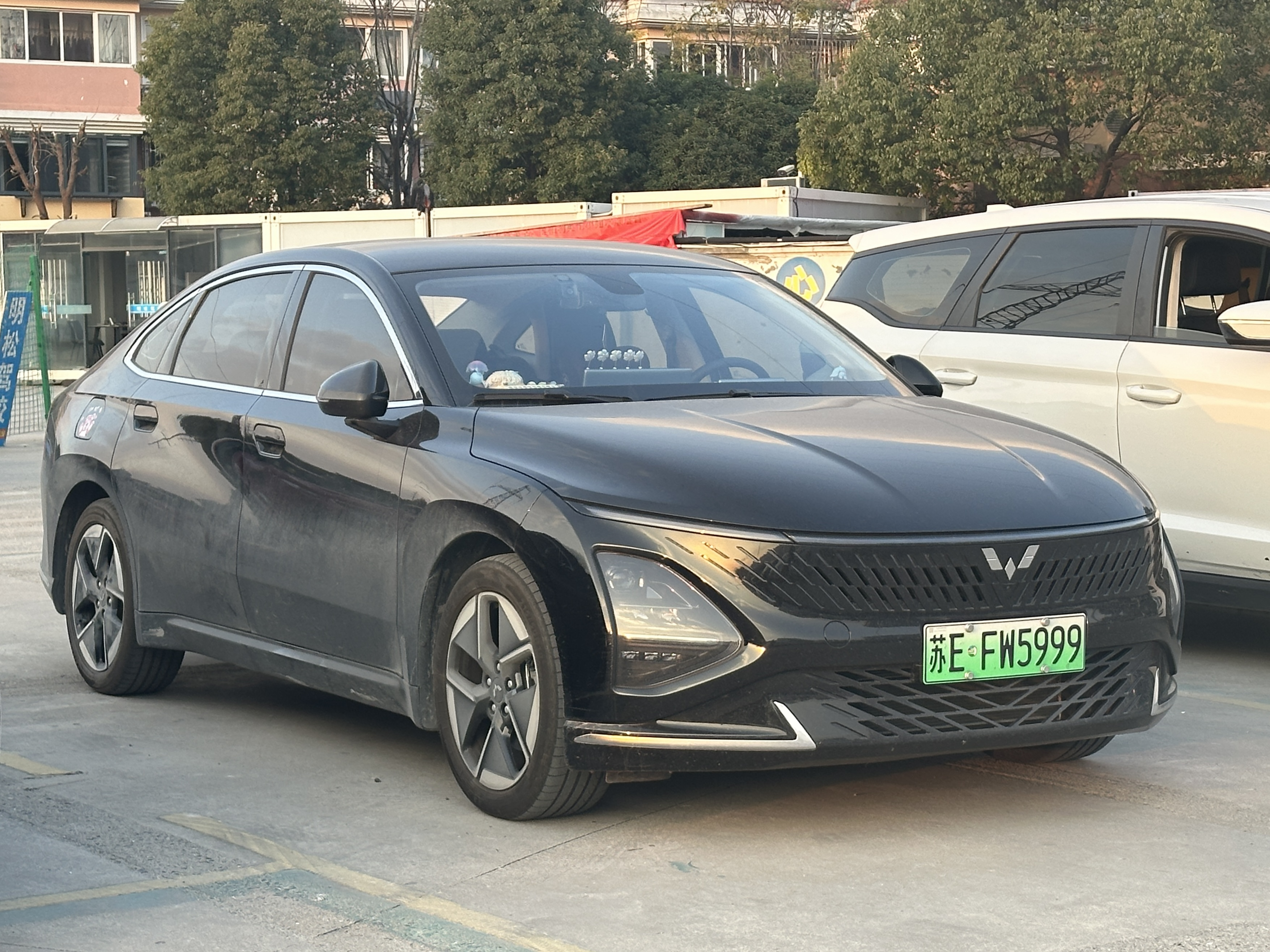
Xingguang

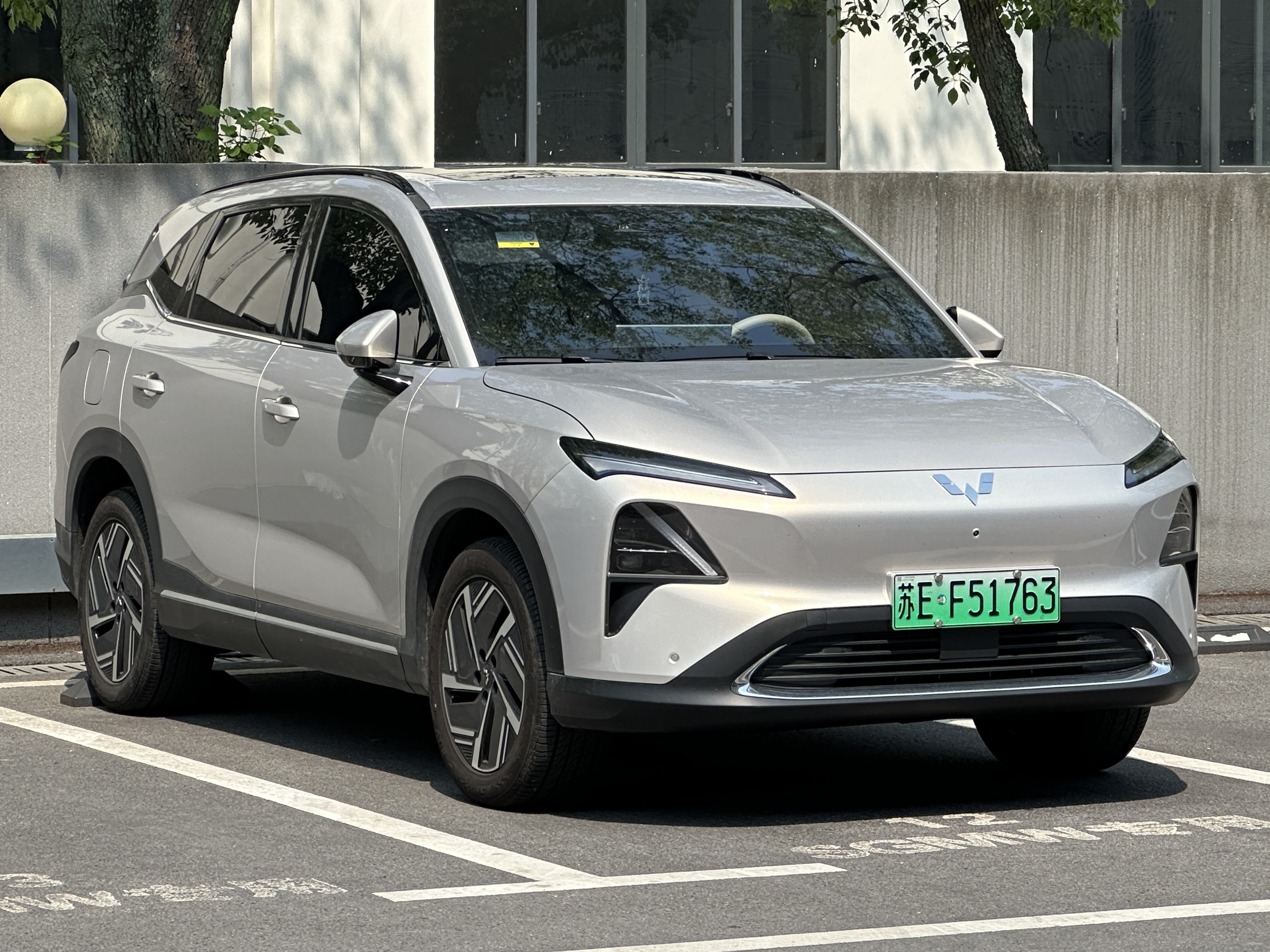
Xingguang S

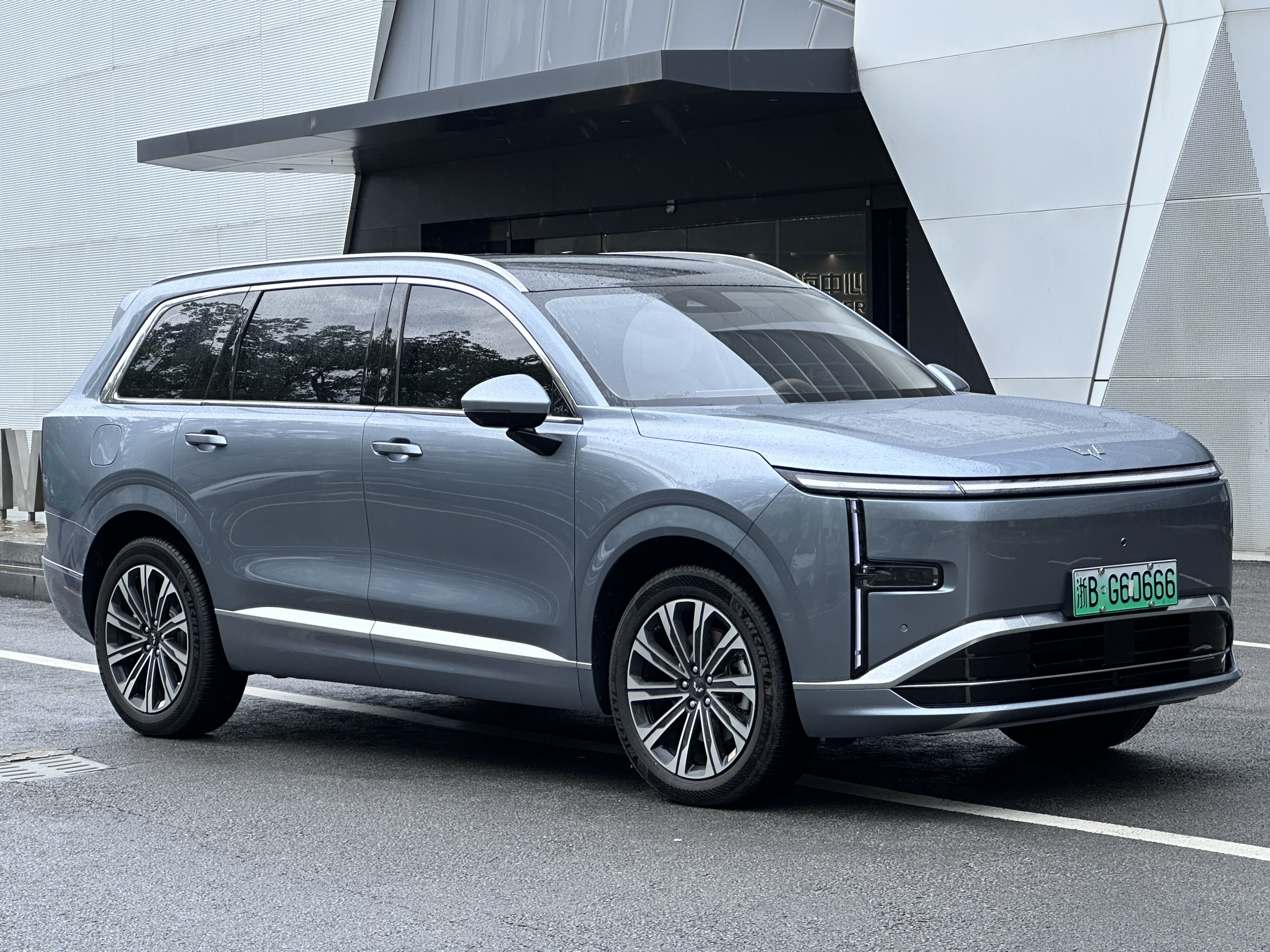
Xingguang L

Xingguang M

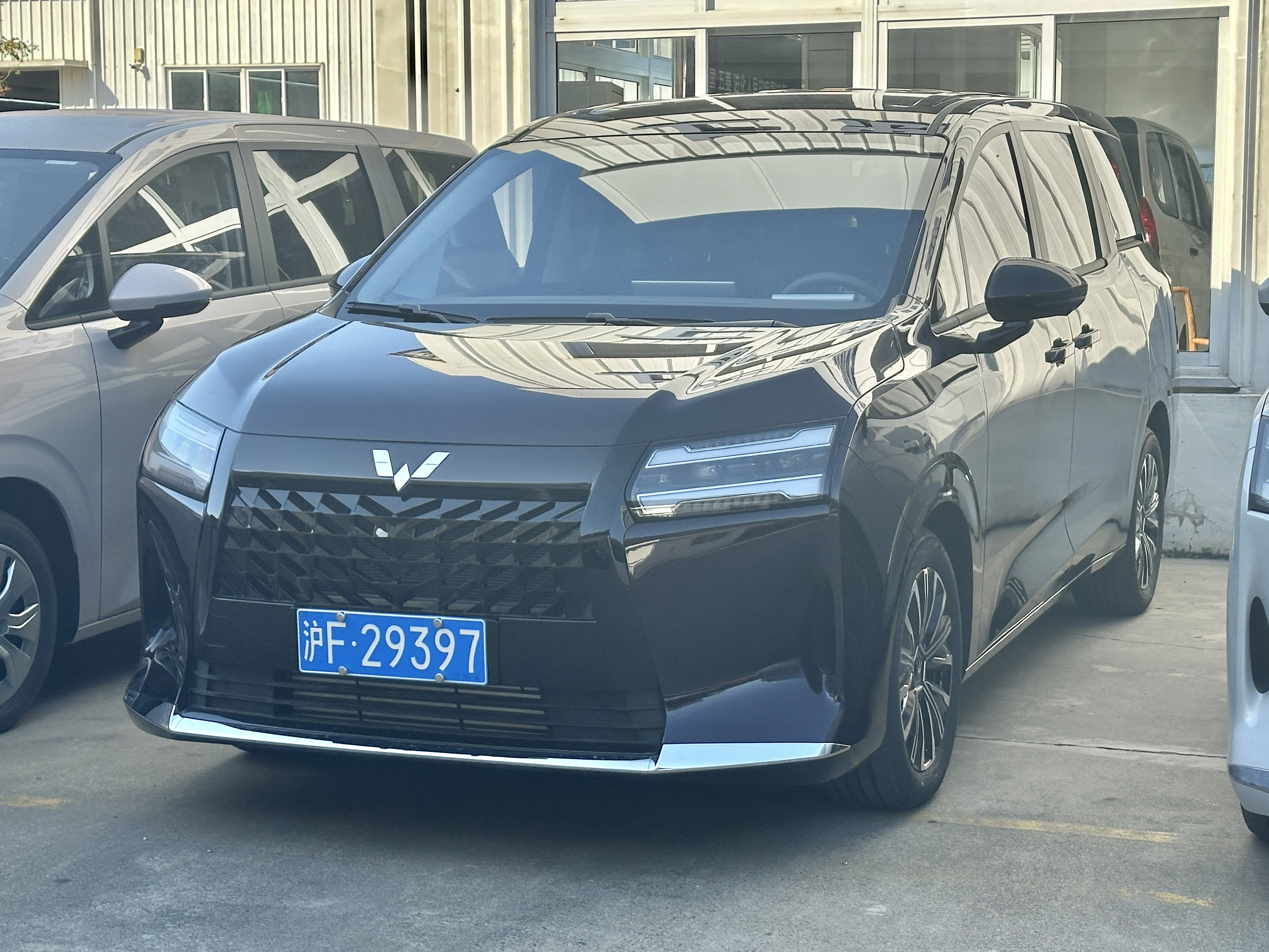
Xingguang 730

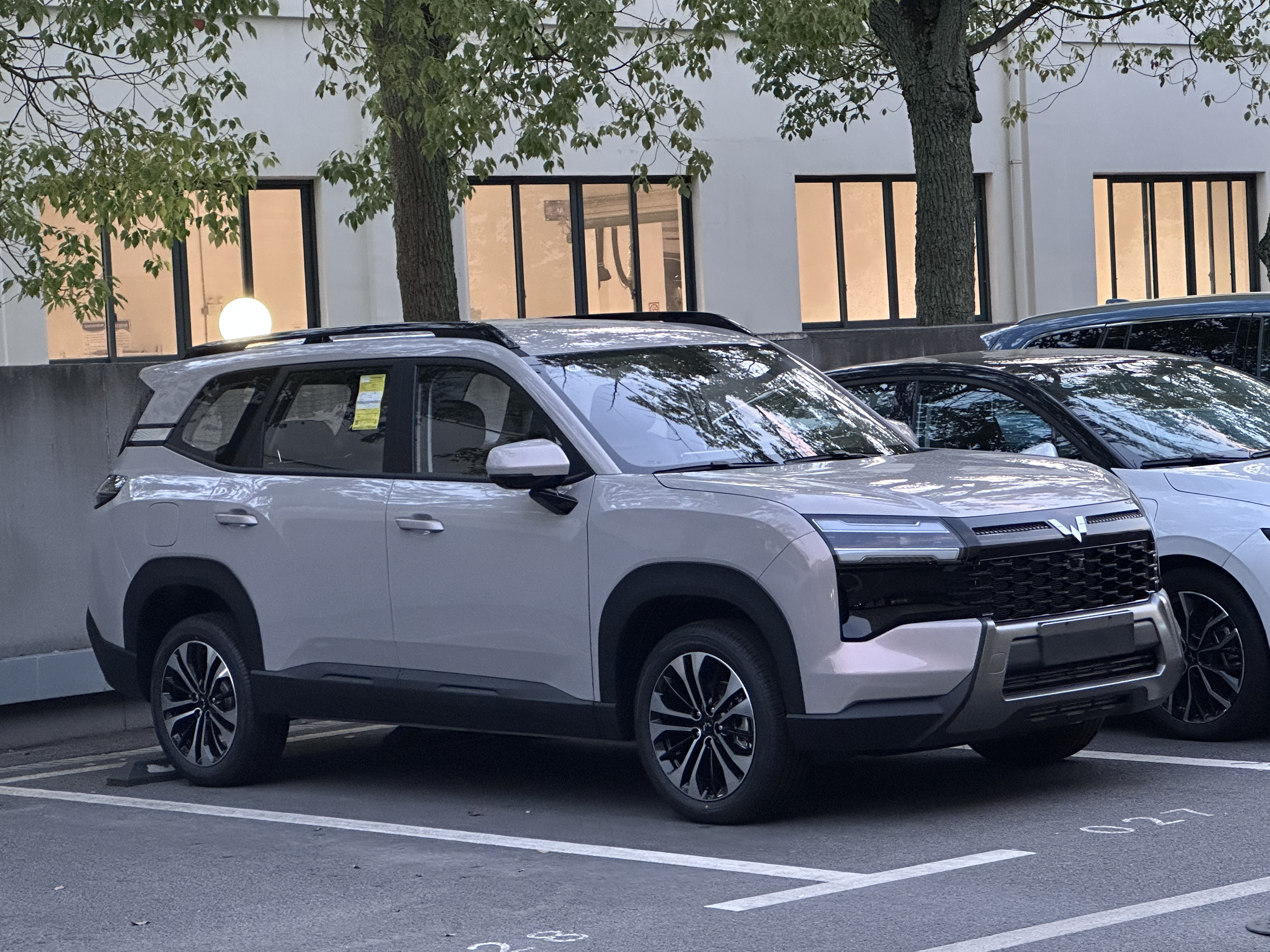
Xingguang 560

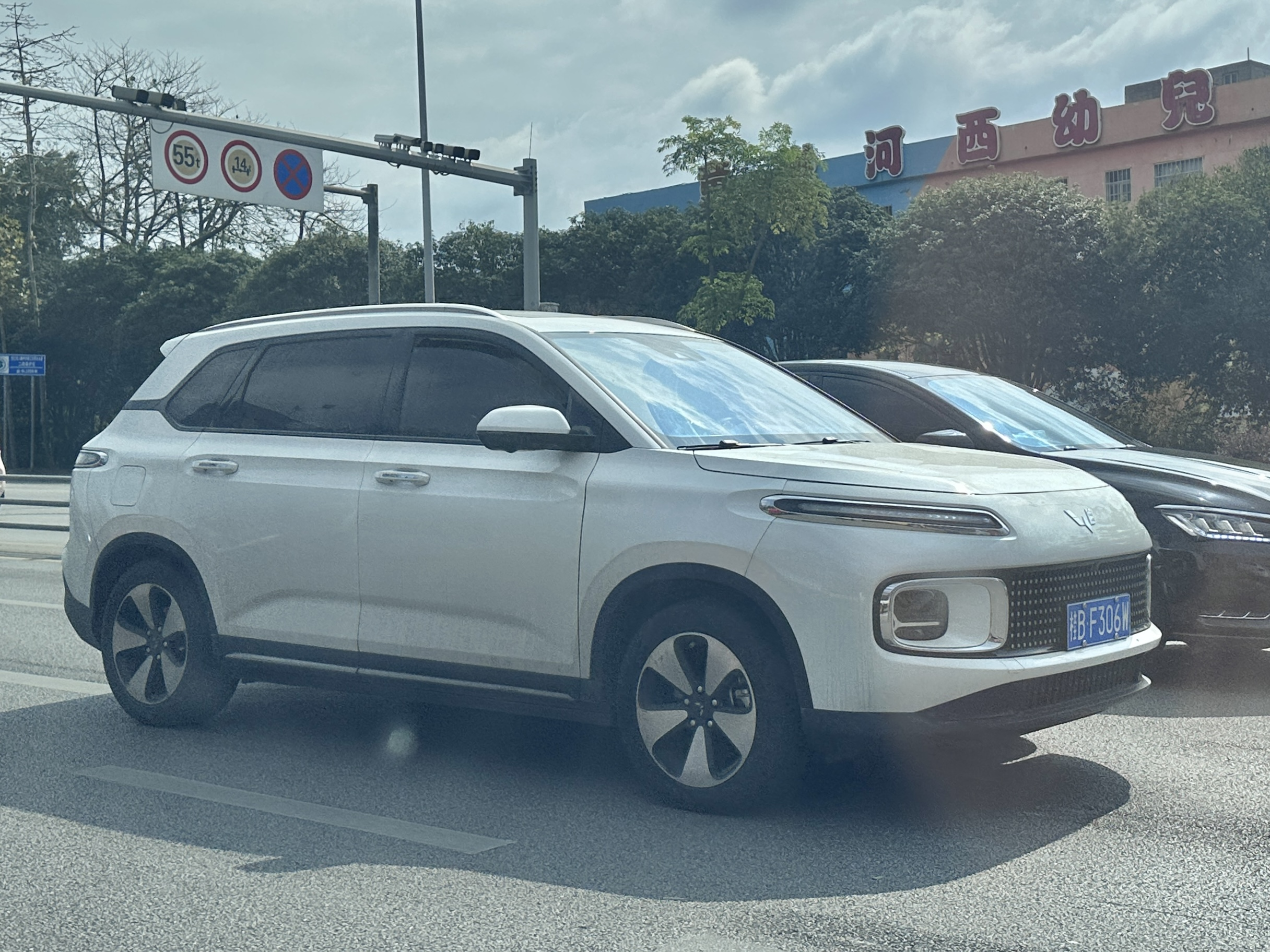
Xingyun

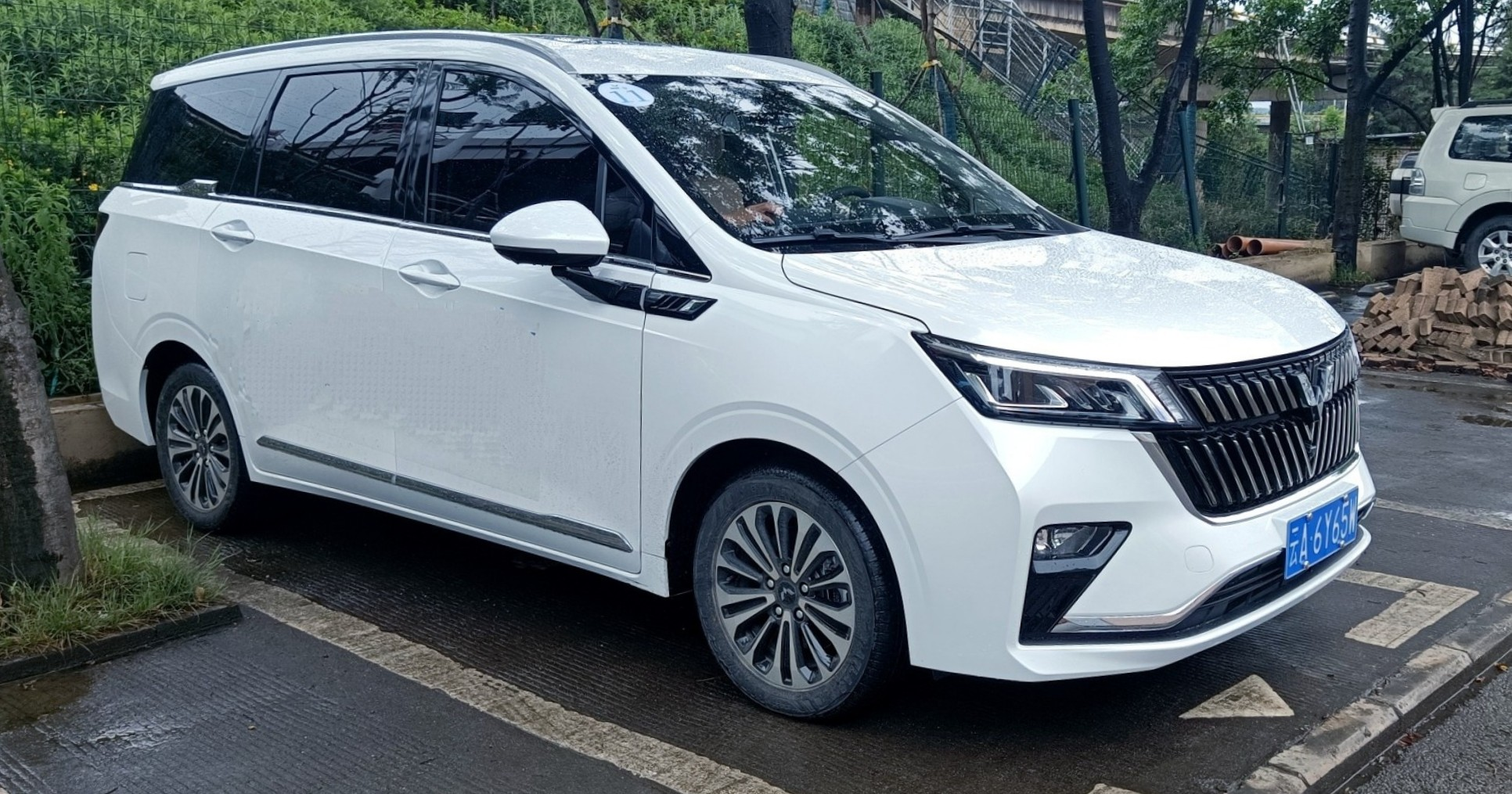
Jiachen

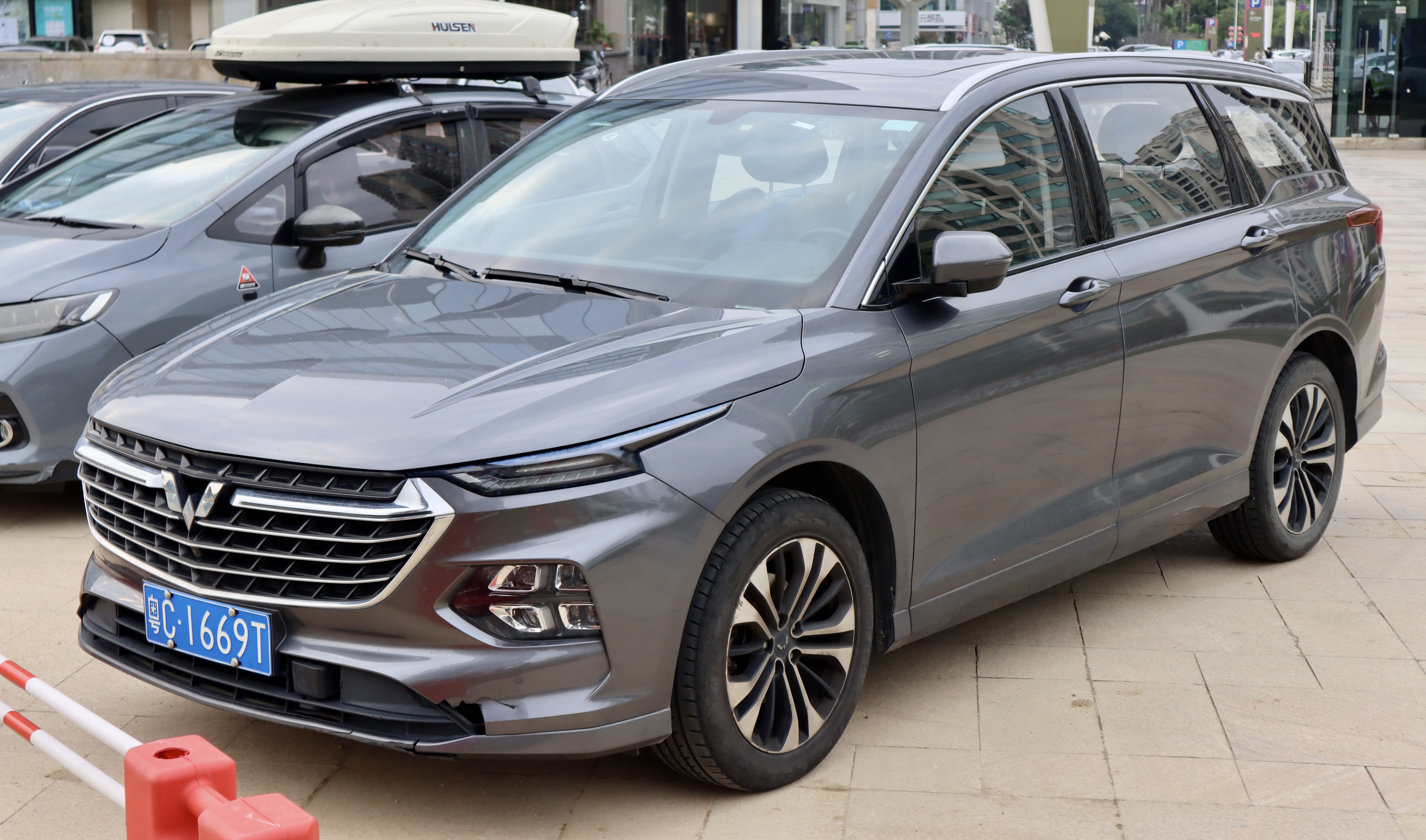
Victory

==== Red Badge ====
- Zhiguang/Sunshine (2002–present), microvan
- Rongguang (2008–present), microvan
- Rongguang Xiaoka (2008–present), microtruck
- Rongguang Xinka (2018–present), microtruck
- Rongguang Jinka (2026–present), microtruck
- Hongguang (2010–present), compact MPV
  - Hongguang V (2015–present), sliding doors variant of Hongguang
- Hongguang EV (2025–present), compact MPV
- Hongguang Plus (2019–present), compact MPV
- Longka (2023–present), mid-size truck
- Zhengcheng (2014–present), full-size MPV
- Yangguang / Mitra EV / Porta EV (2024–present), mid-size van, BEV
- Yangguang L (2026–present), mid-size van, BEV
- Yangguang Pro (2026–present), mid-size van, BEV/PHEV

===== Discontinued =====
- Zhengtu (2021–2025), pickup truck
- E10 (2023–2025), microvan
- Hongtu (2007–2012), microvan
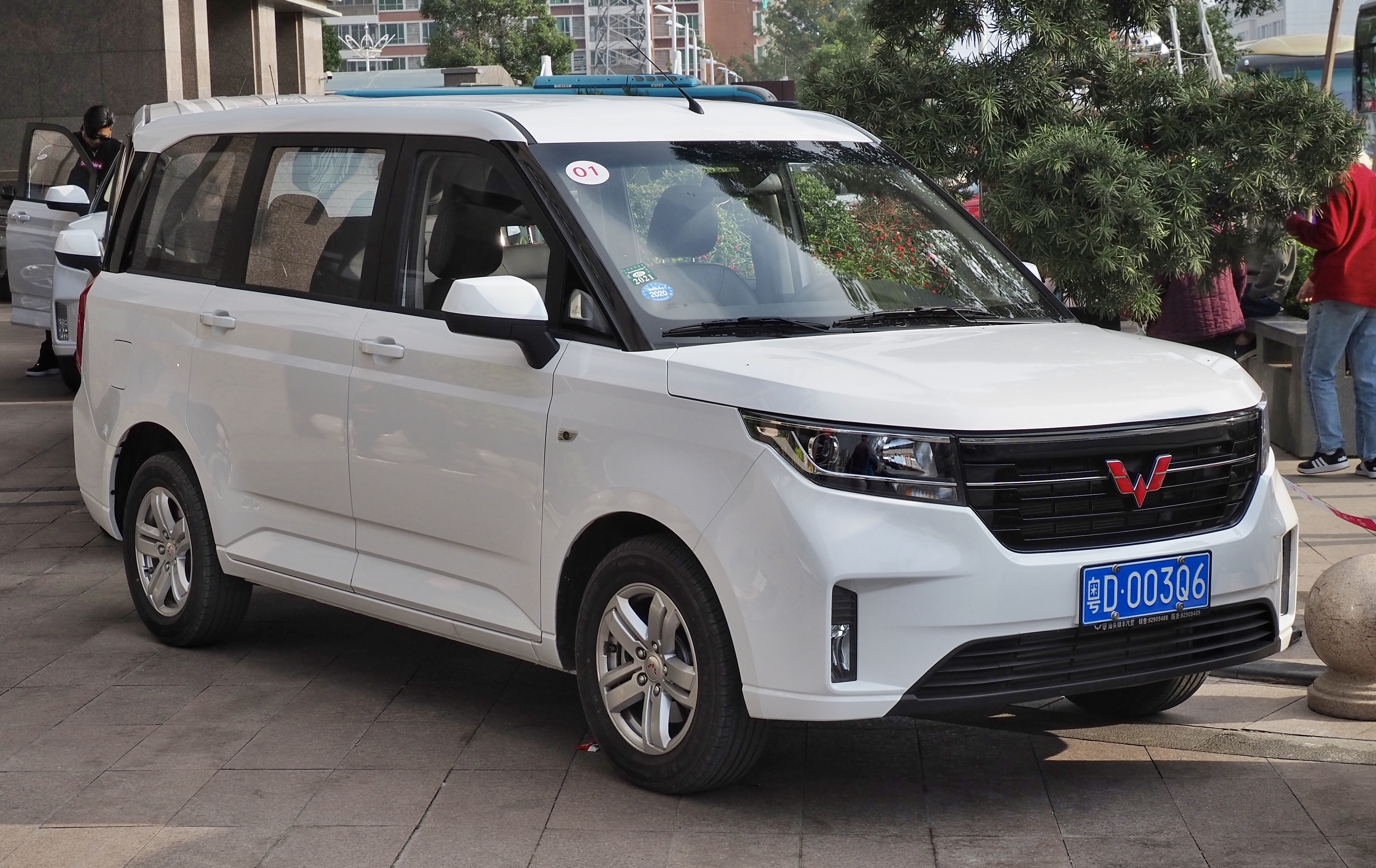
Hongguang Plus

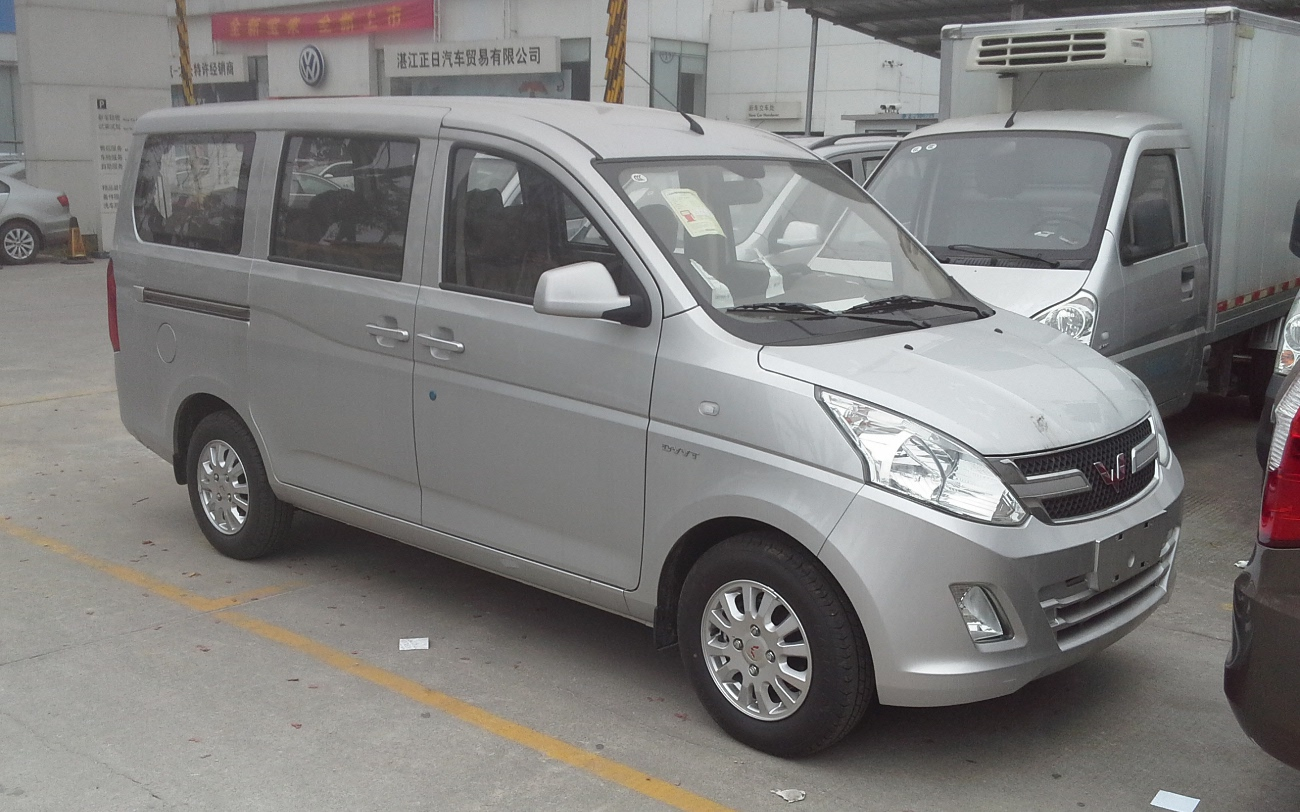
Hongguang V

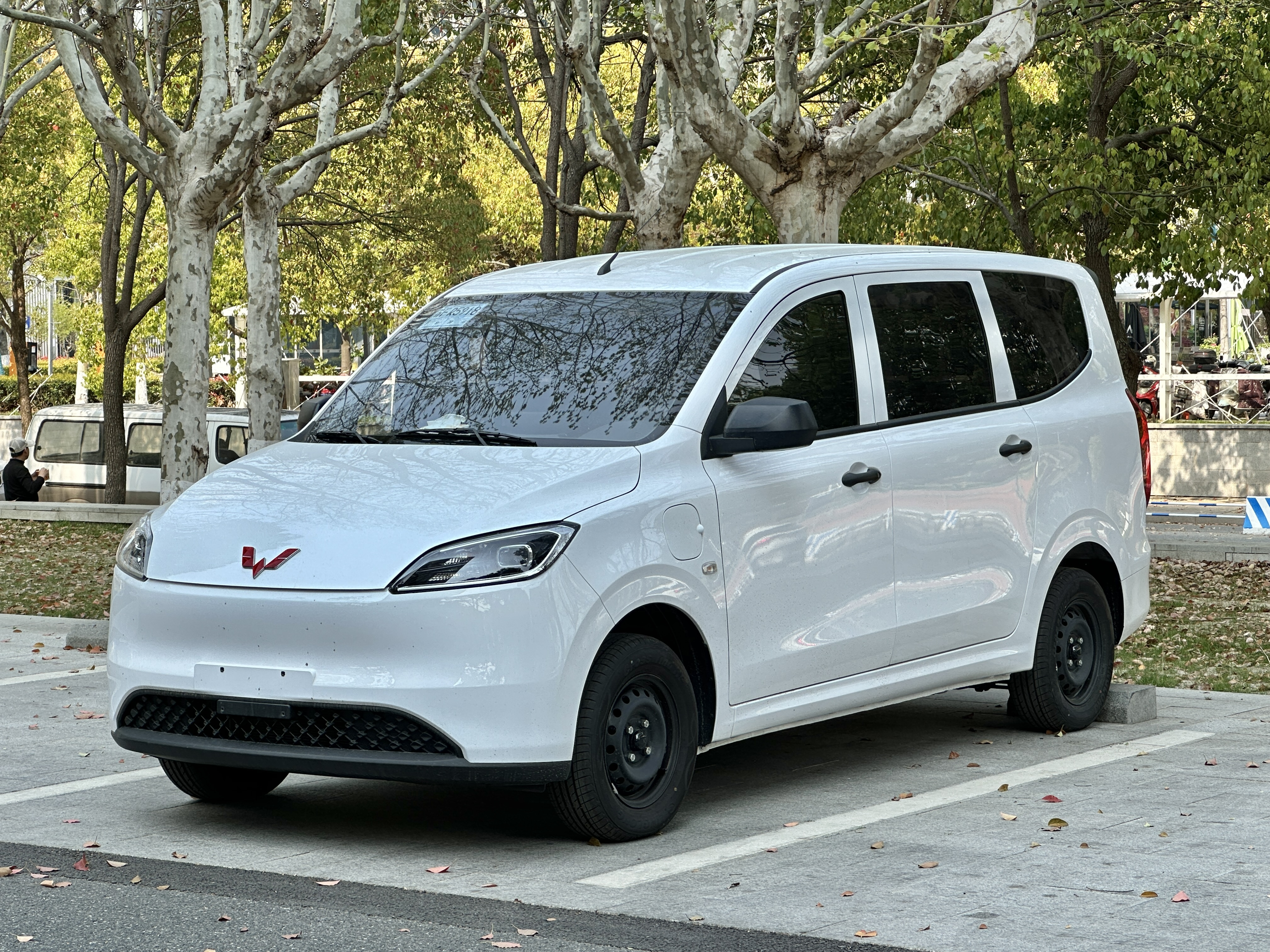
Hongguang EV

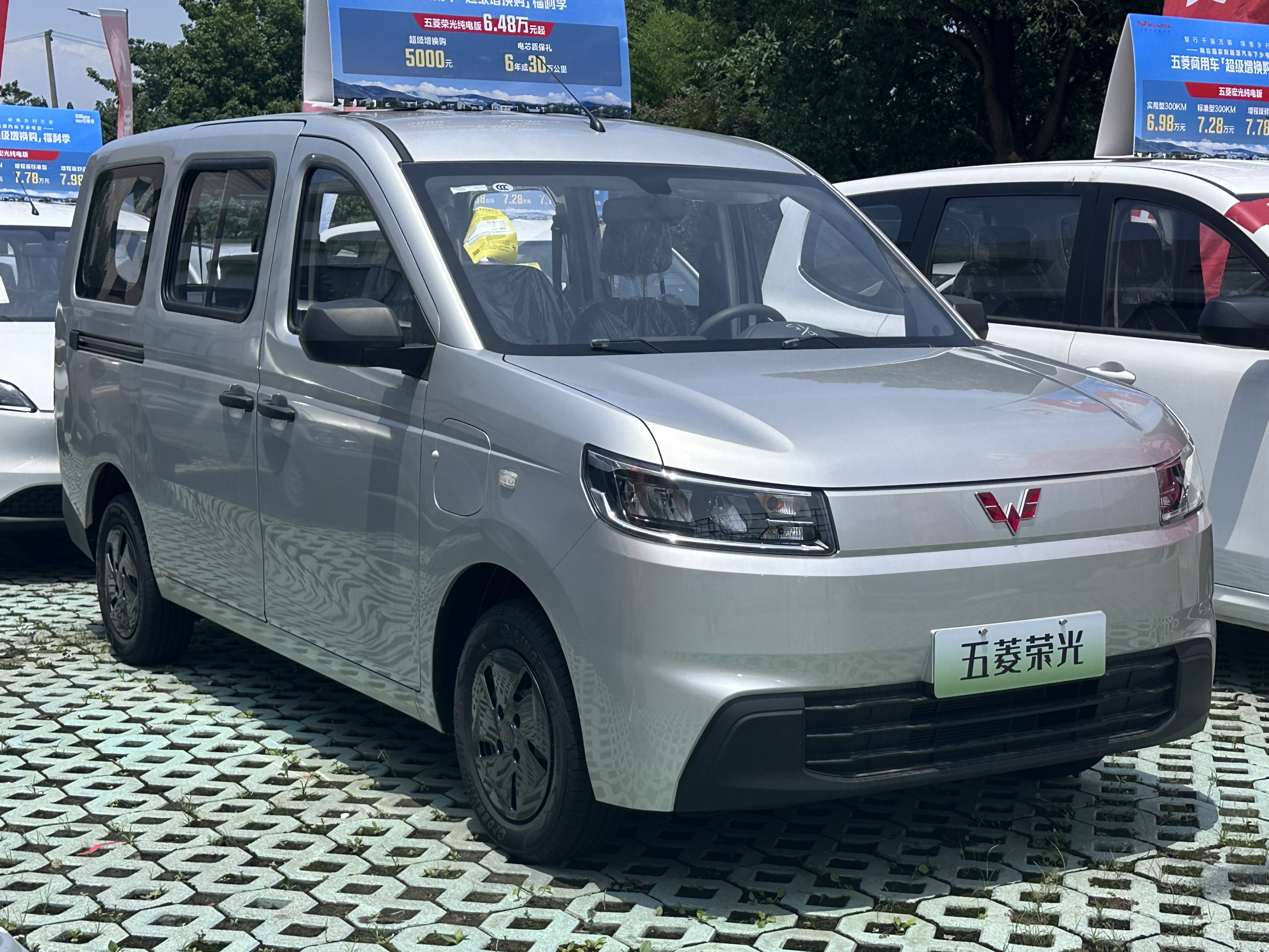
Rongguang EV

Rongguang Jinka T30

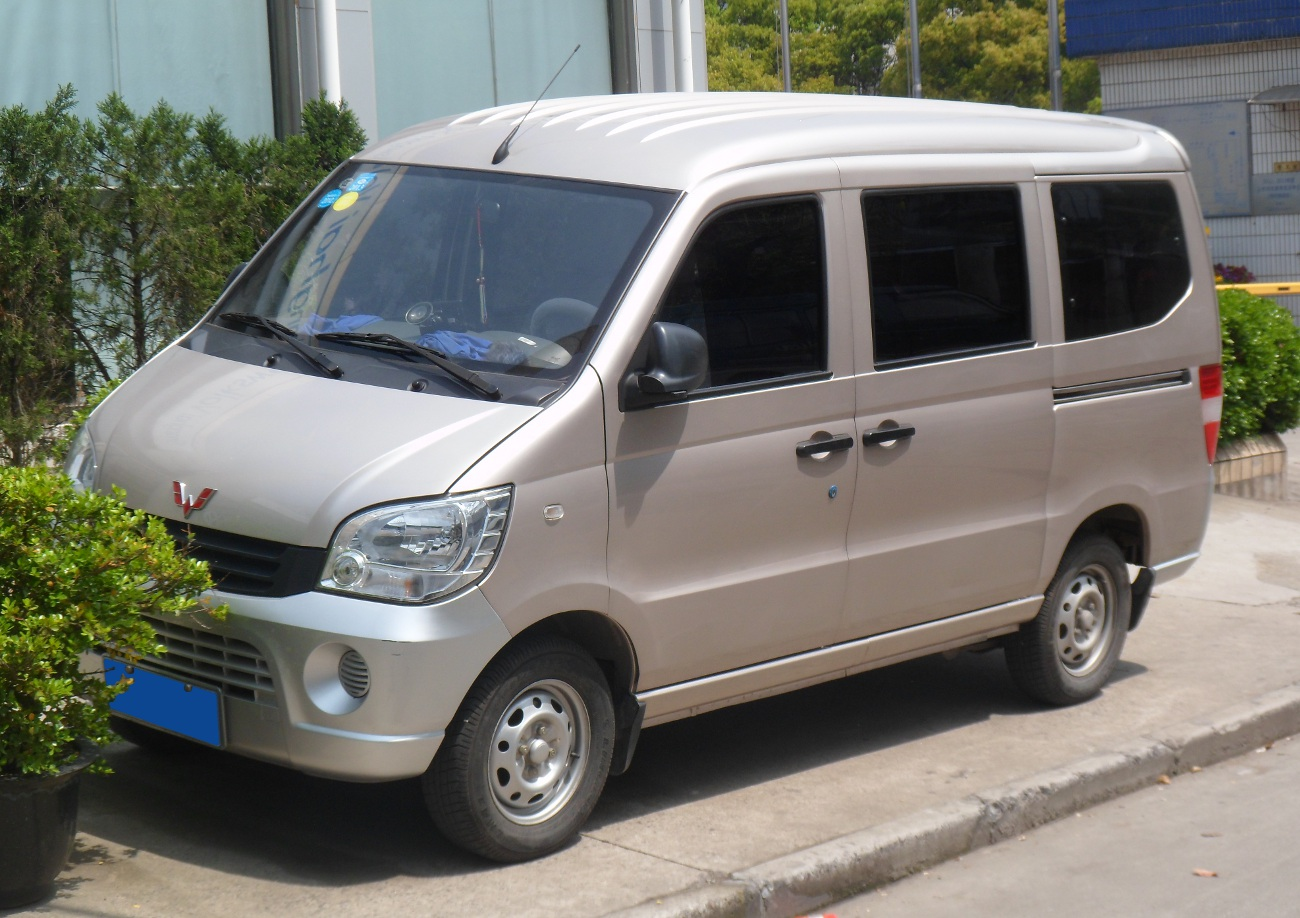
Sunshine II

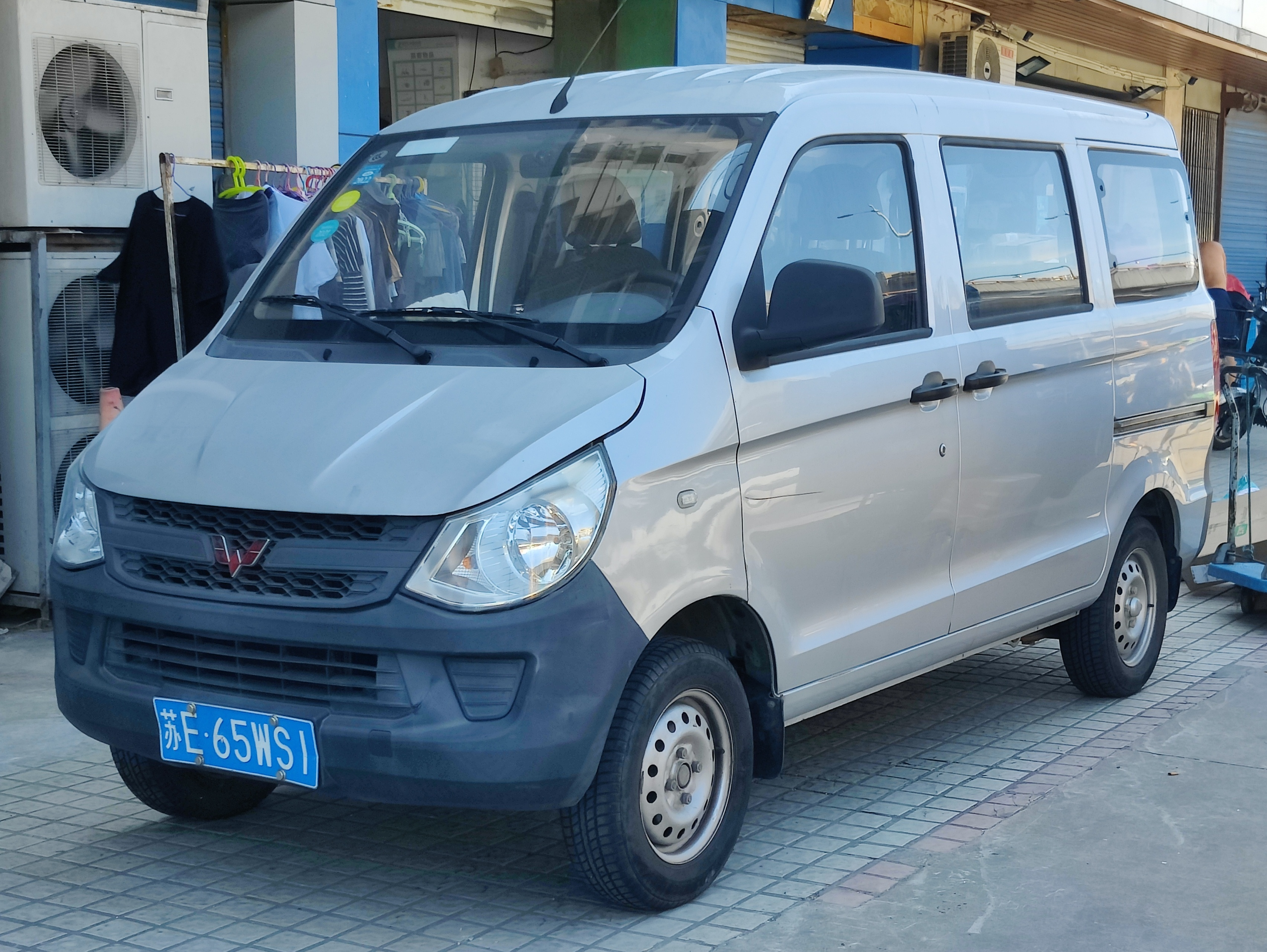
Sunshine S

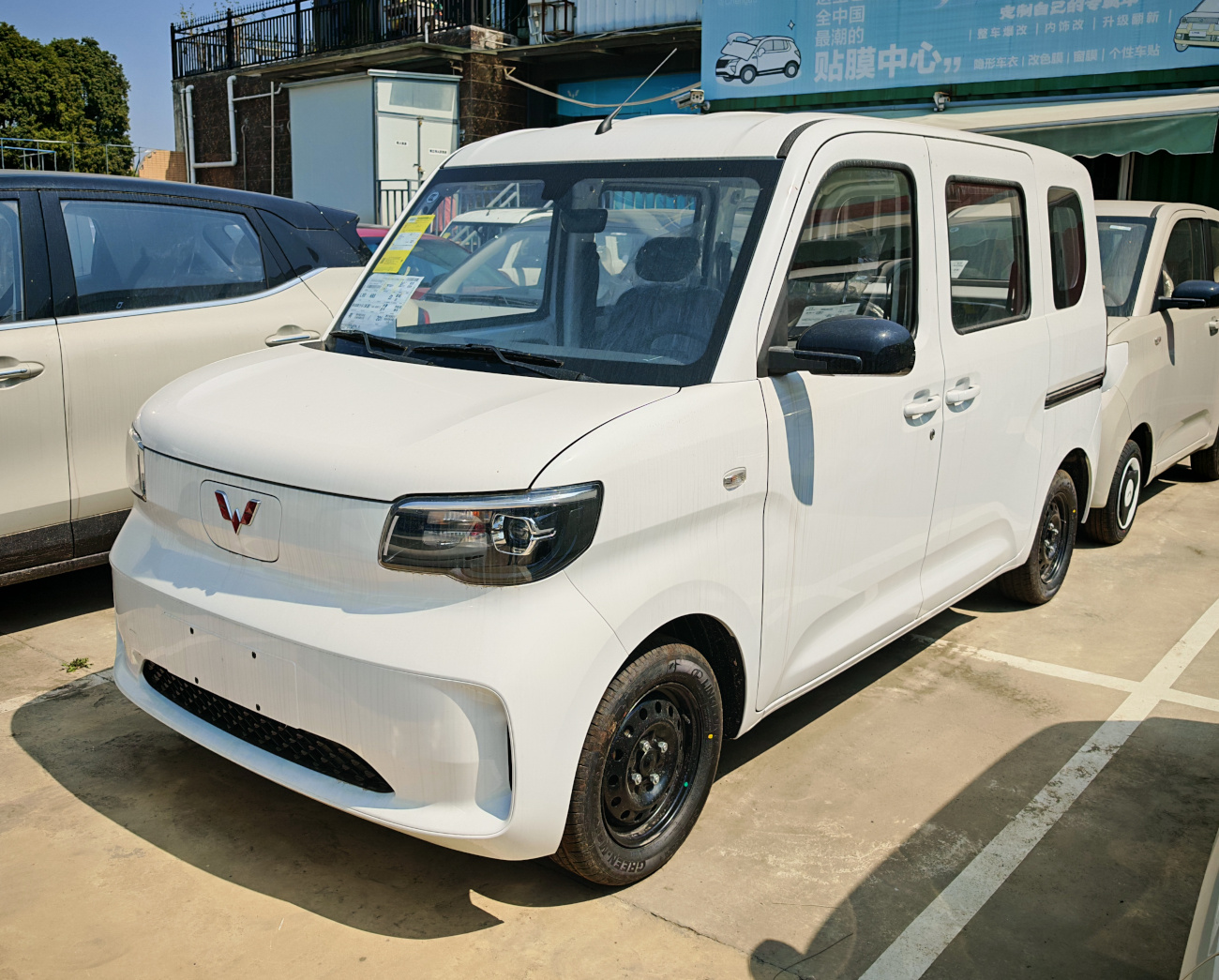
Sunshine EV

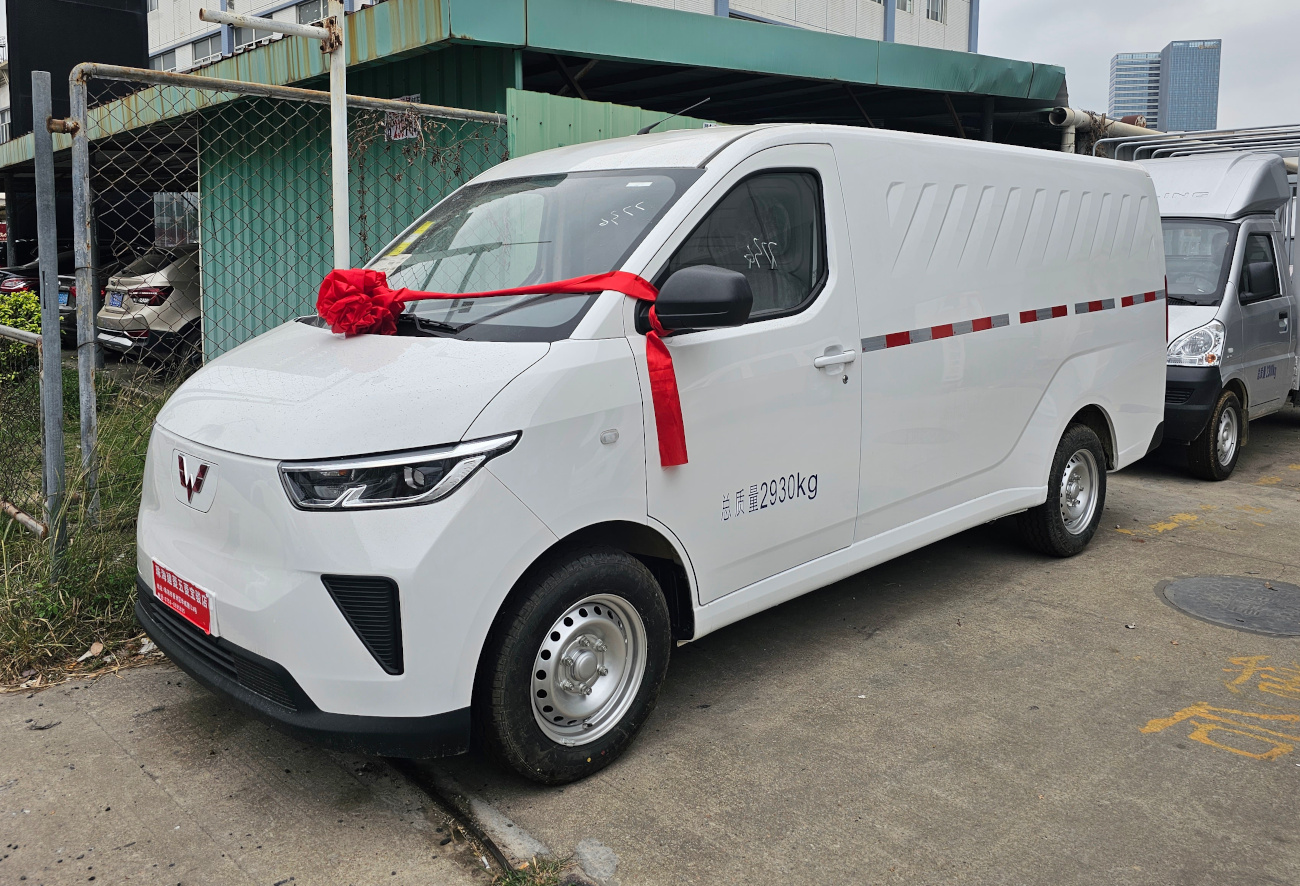
Yangguang

Yangguang L

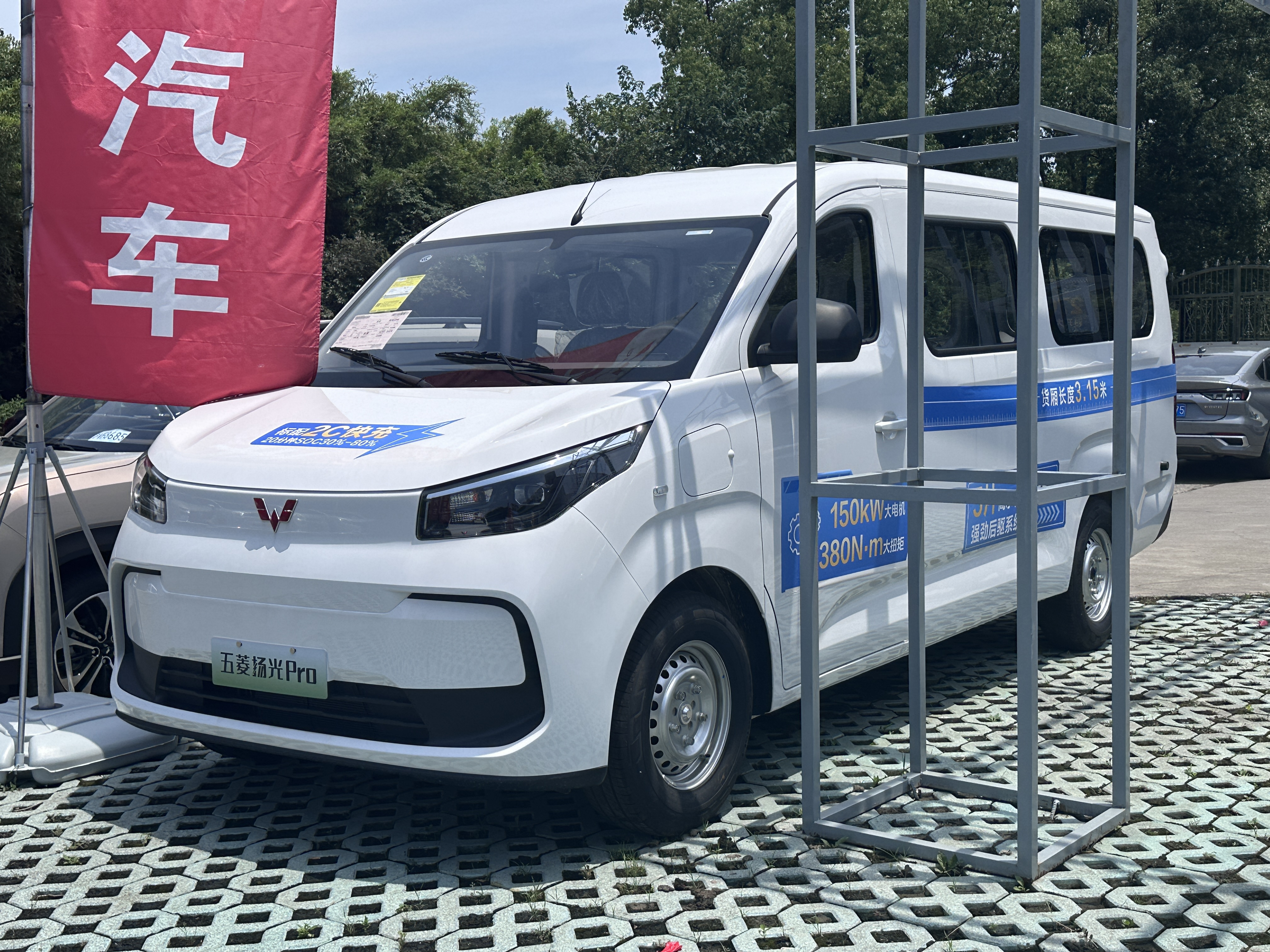
Yangguang Pro

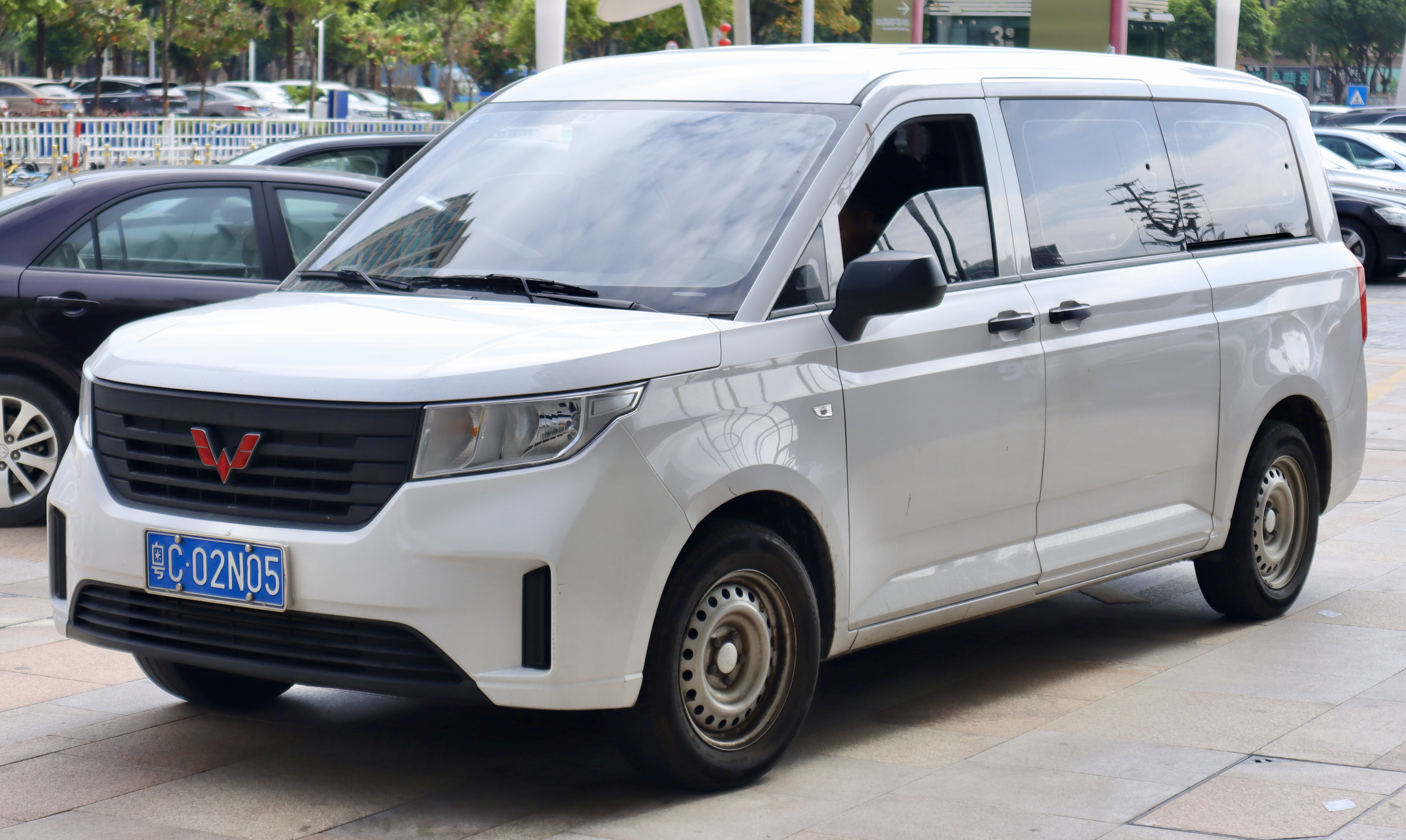
Zhengcheng

==== Indonesian-only models ====
- Wuling Confero (2017–present), rebadged Wuling Hongguang S1
- Wuling Formo (2018–present), van version of the Wuling Hongguang S1
- Wuling Formo Max (2023–present), pickup version of the Wuling Hongguang S1
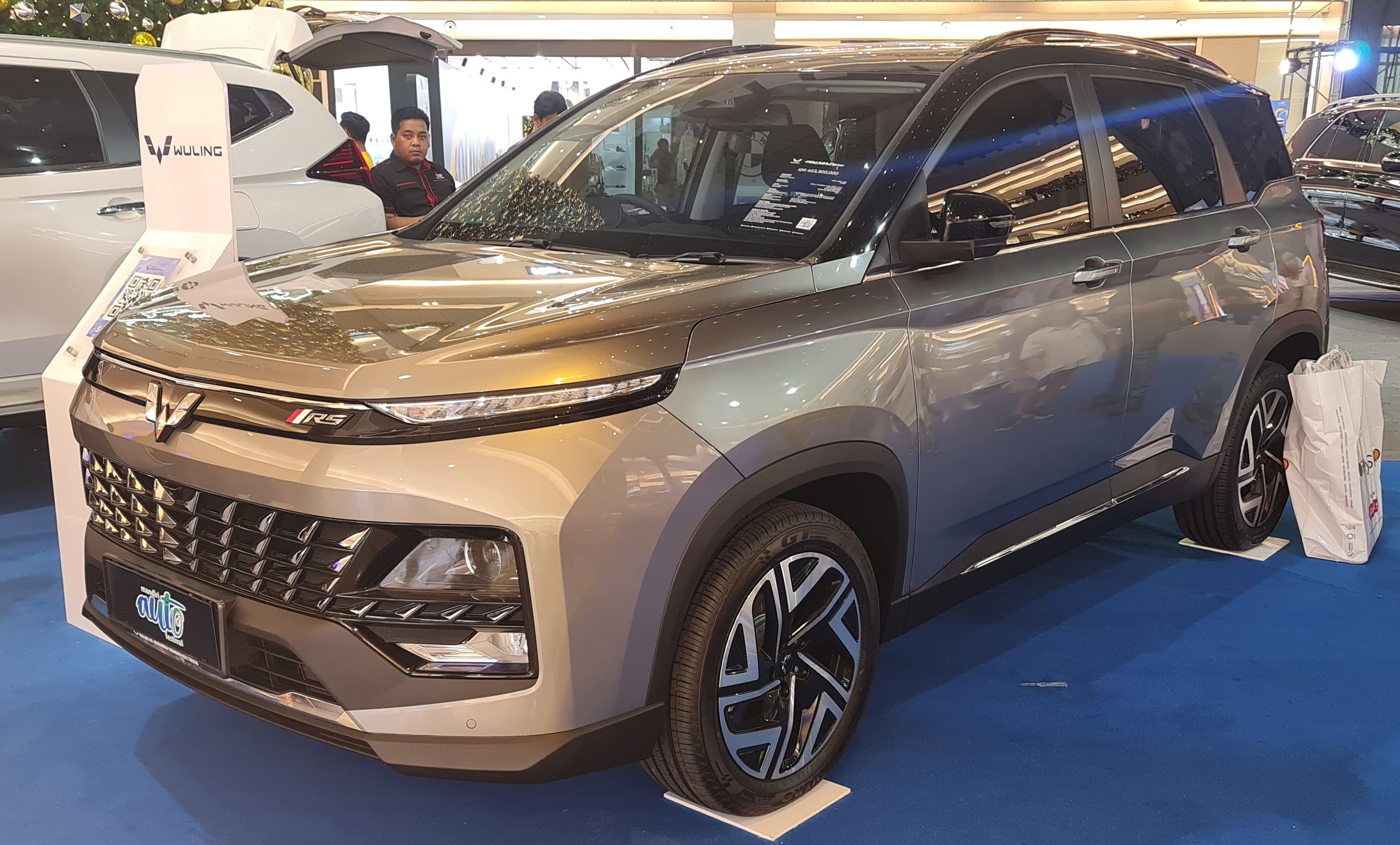
Almaz

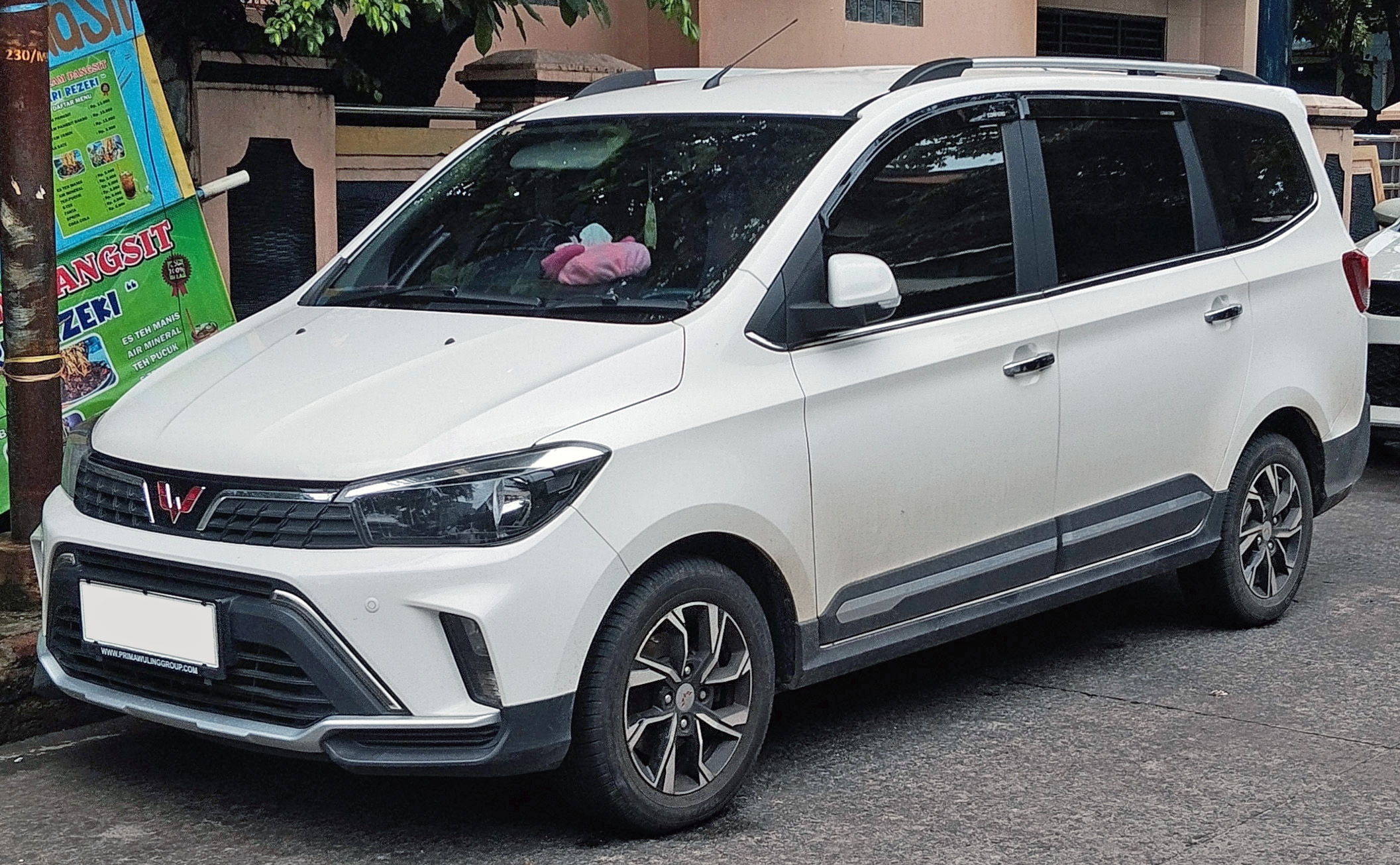
Confero

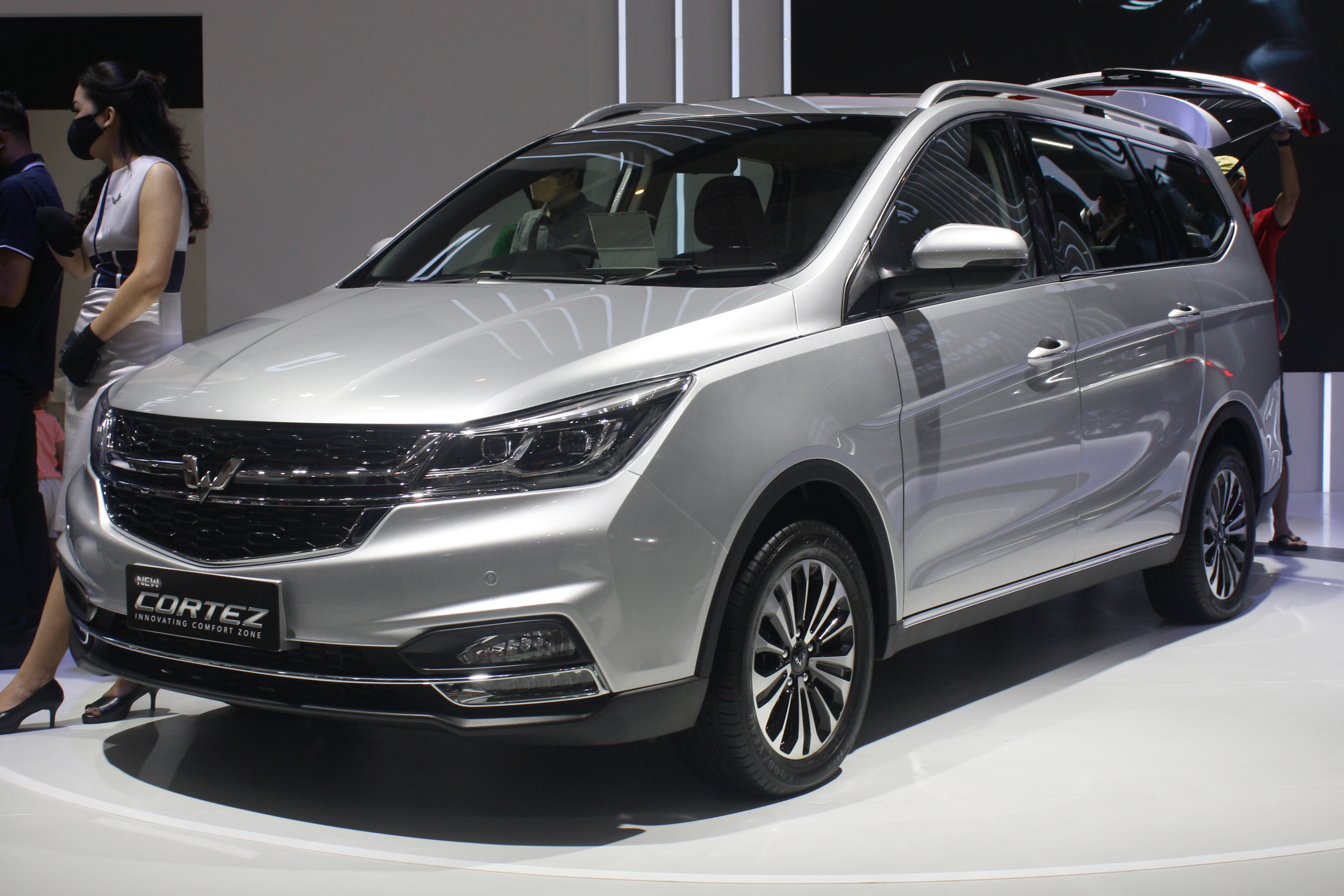
Cortez

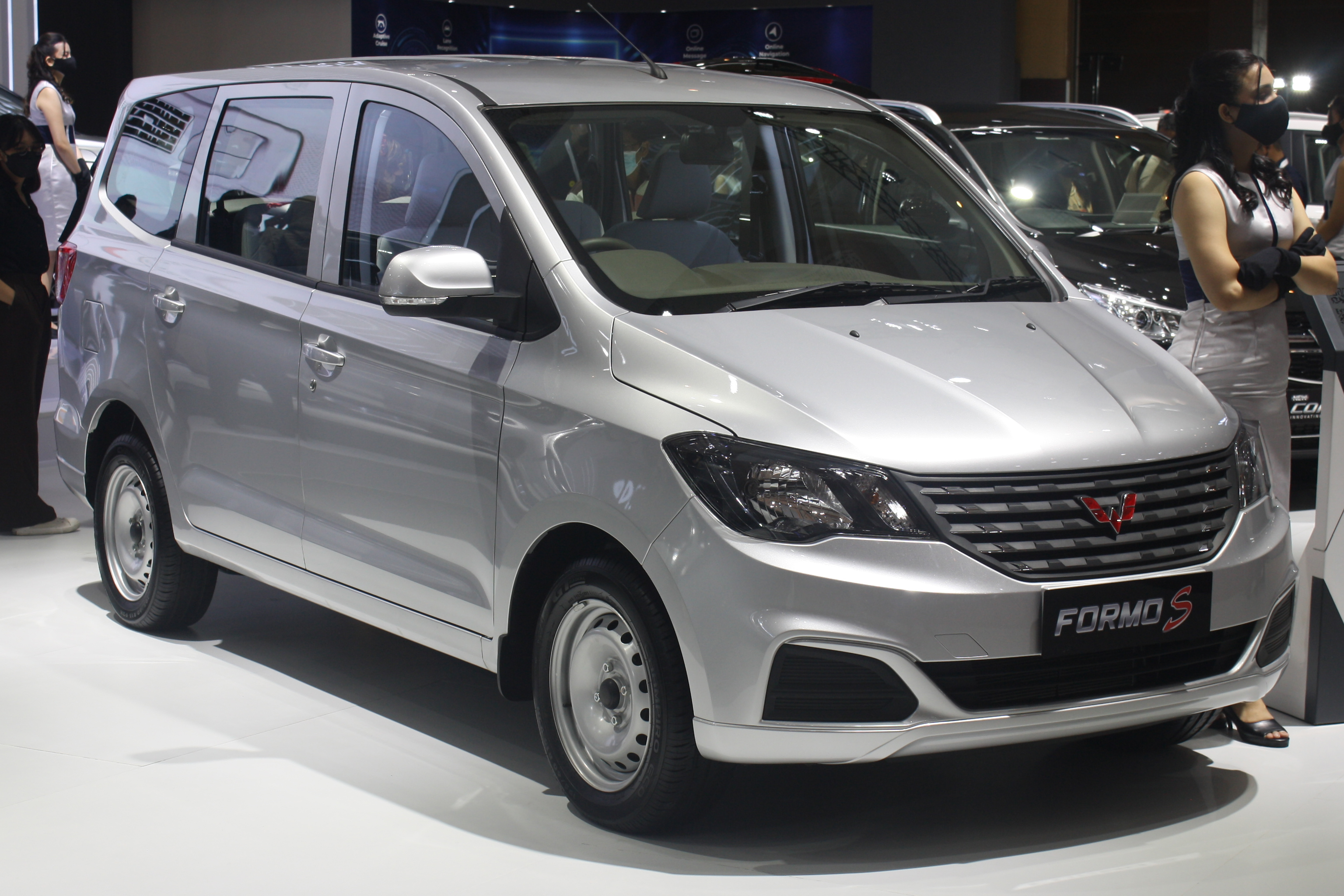
Formo

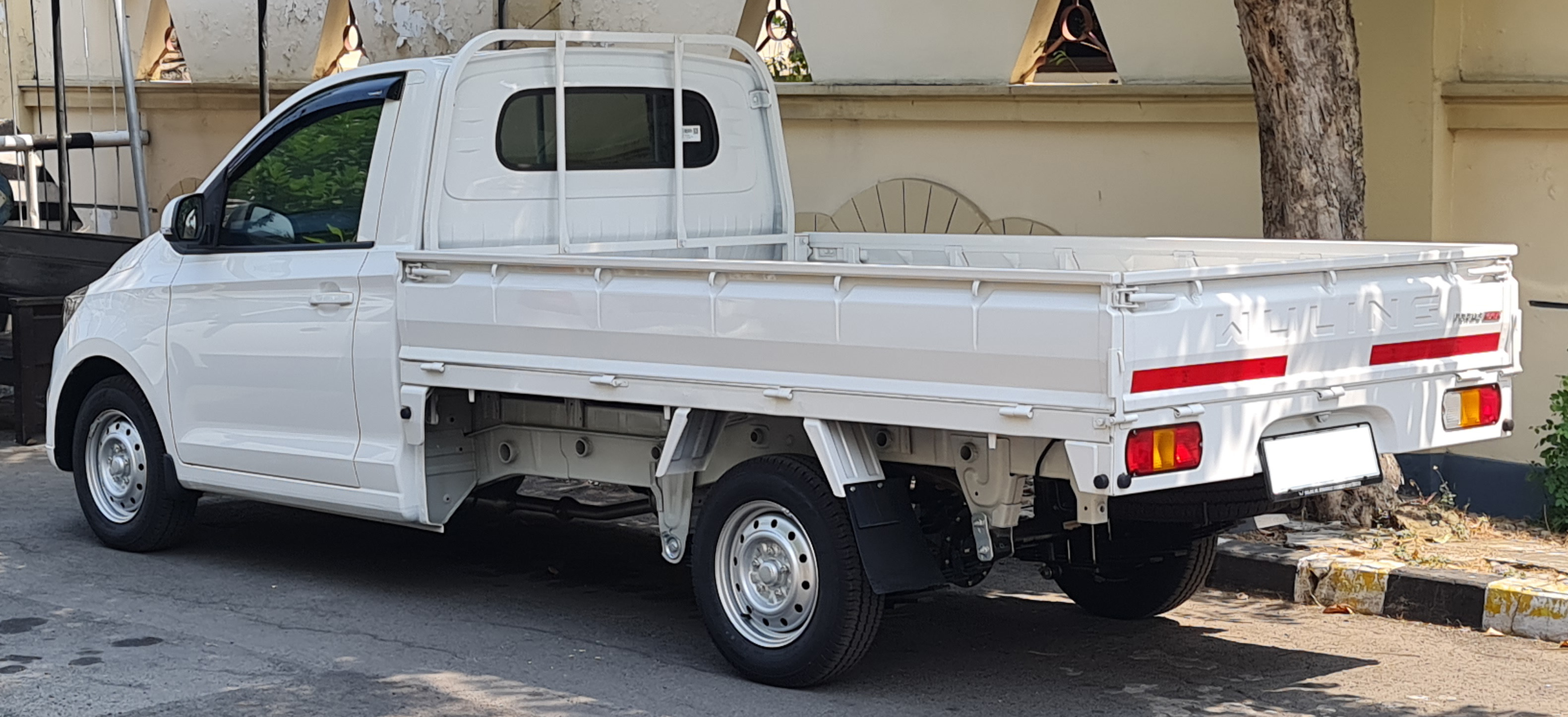
Formo Max

=== Export-only models ===
- Chevrolet Aveo/Sail/Optra (2023–present)
- Chevrolet Captiva (2018–present), rebadged Baojun 530
- Chevrolet Captiva PHEV/EV (2025–present), rebadged Wuling Starlight S
- Chevrolet Groove (2025–present), rebadged Wuling Xingchi
- Chevrolet N300/Move (2010–present), rebadged Wuling Rongguang
- Chevrolet N400/Tornado Van (2019–present), rebadged Wuling Hongguang V
- Chevrolet Spark EUV (2025–present), rebadged Baojun Yep Plus

=== Huajing ===
Huajing is a car brand owned by SGMW. It is the first brand codeveloped by SAIC-GM-Wuling and Huawei Qiankun.

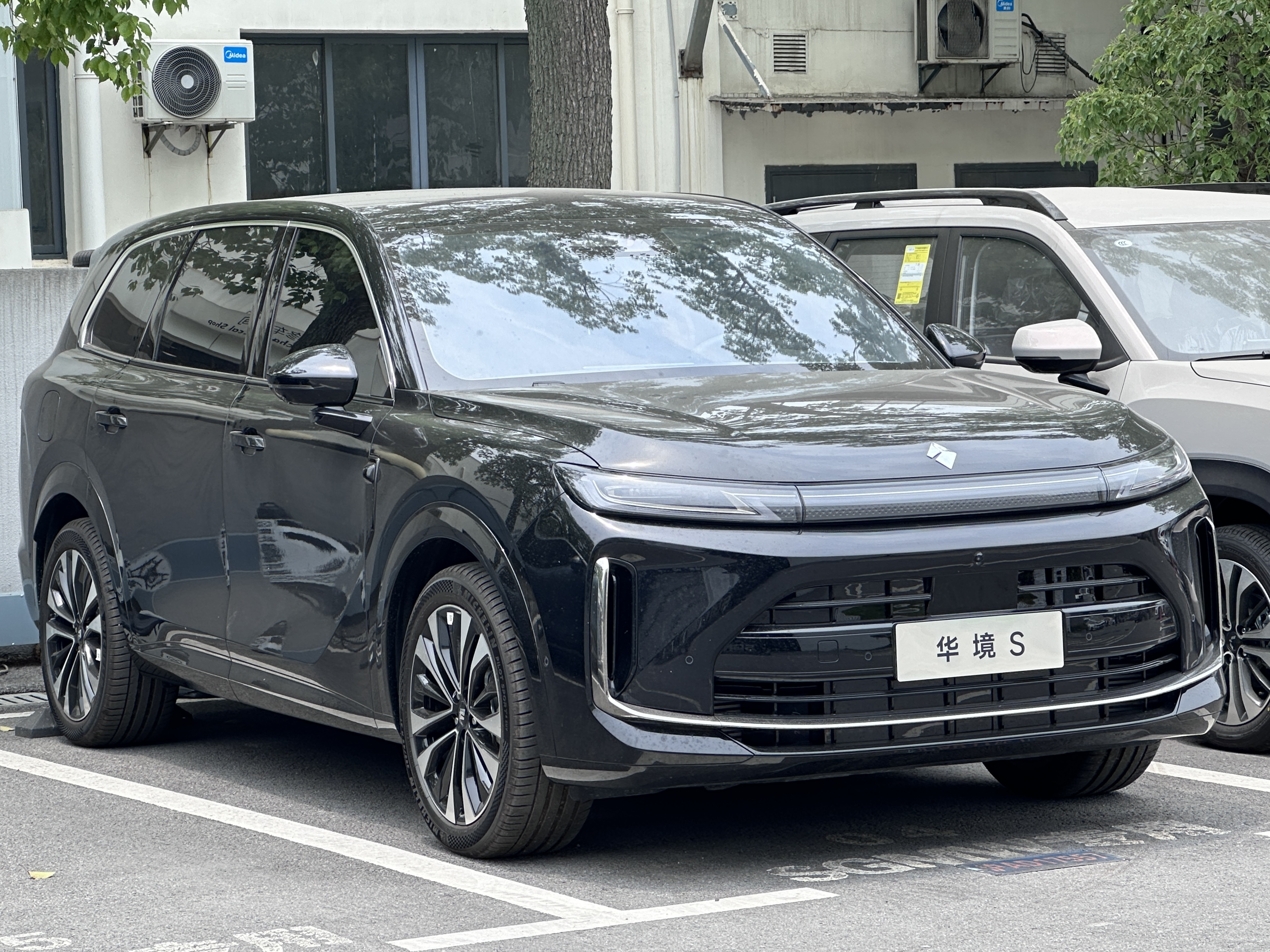
Huajing S

=== Baojun ===
Baojun is a car brand owned by SGMW. It is an upmarket alternative to the Wuling brand.

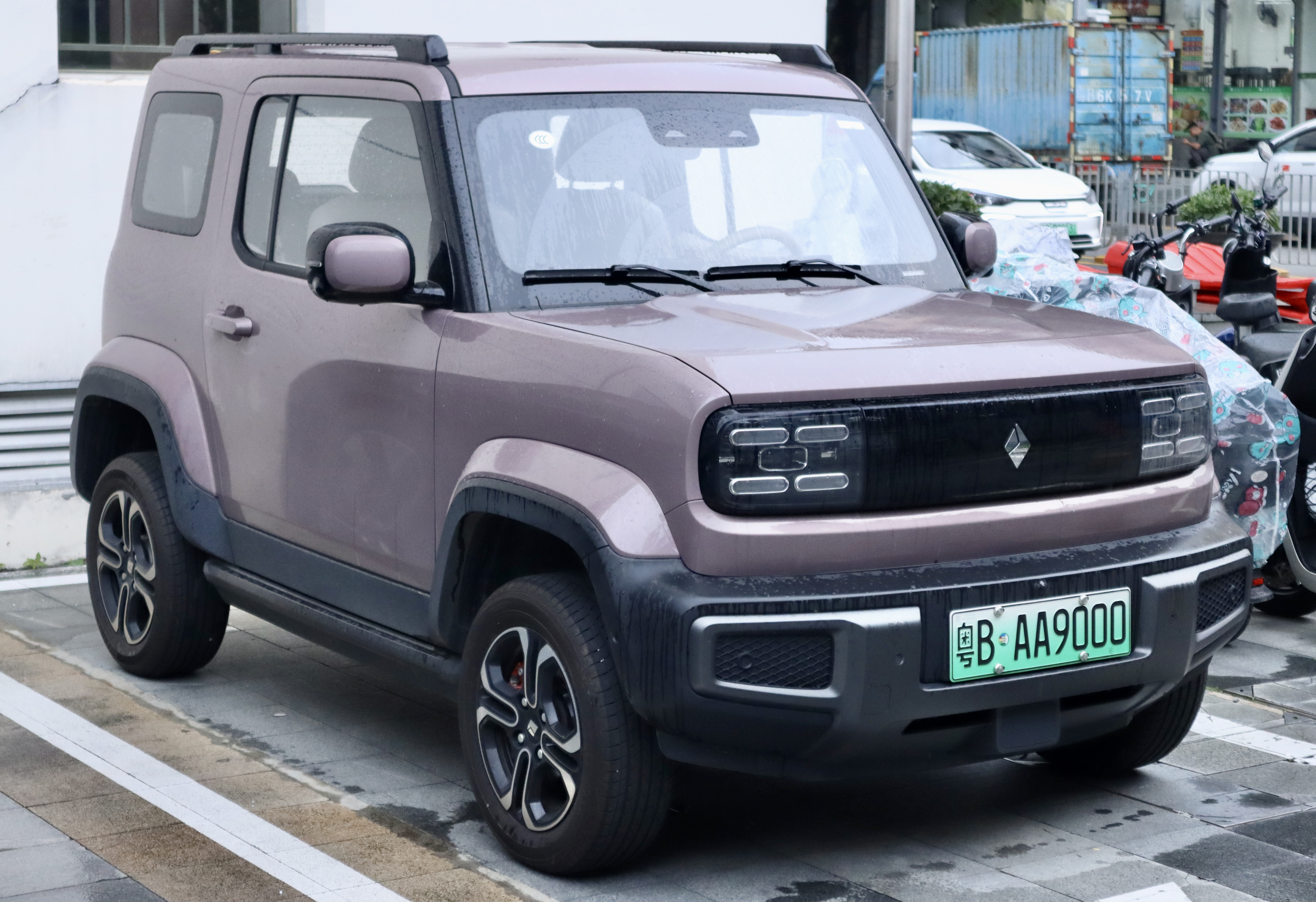
Yep

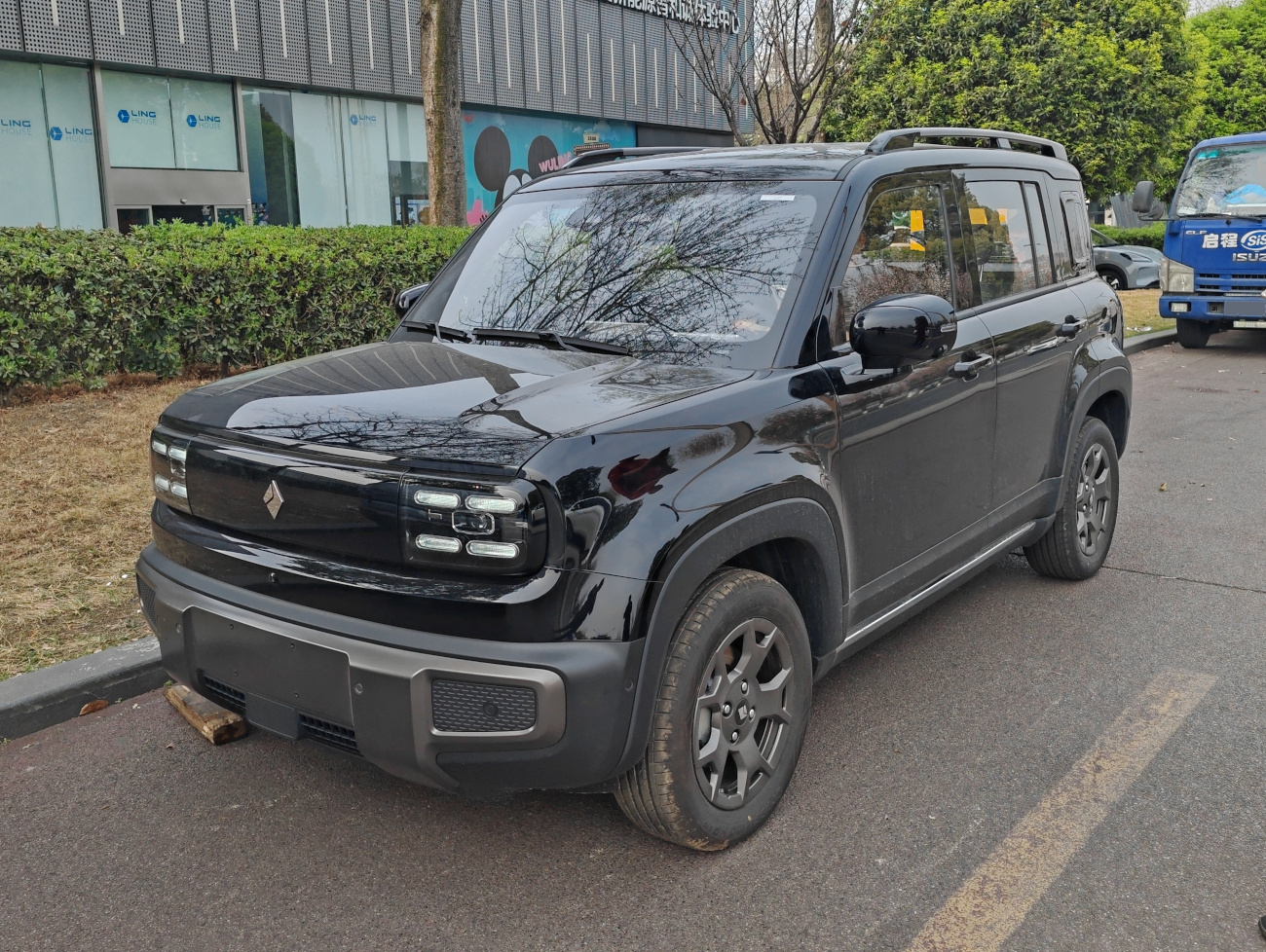
Yep Plus

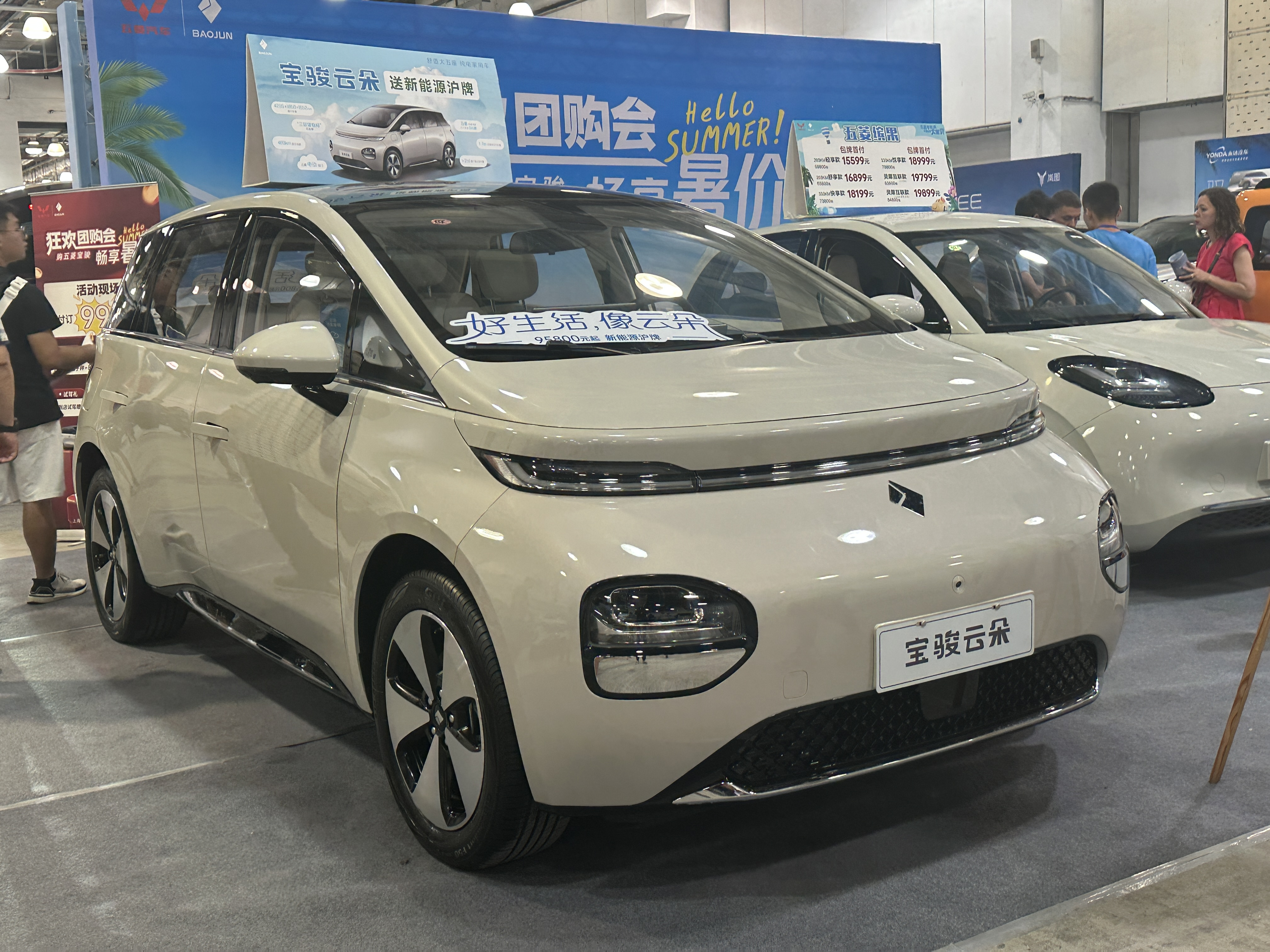
Yunduo

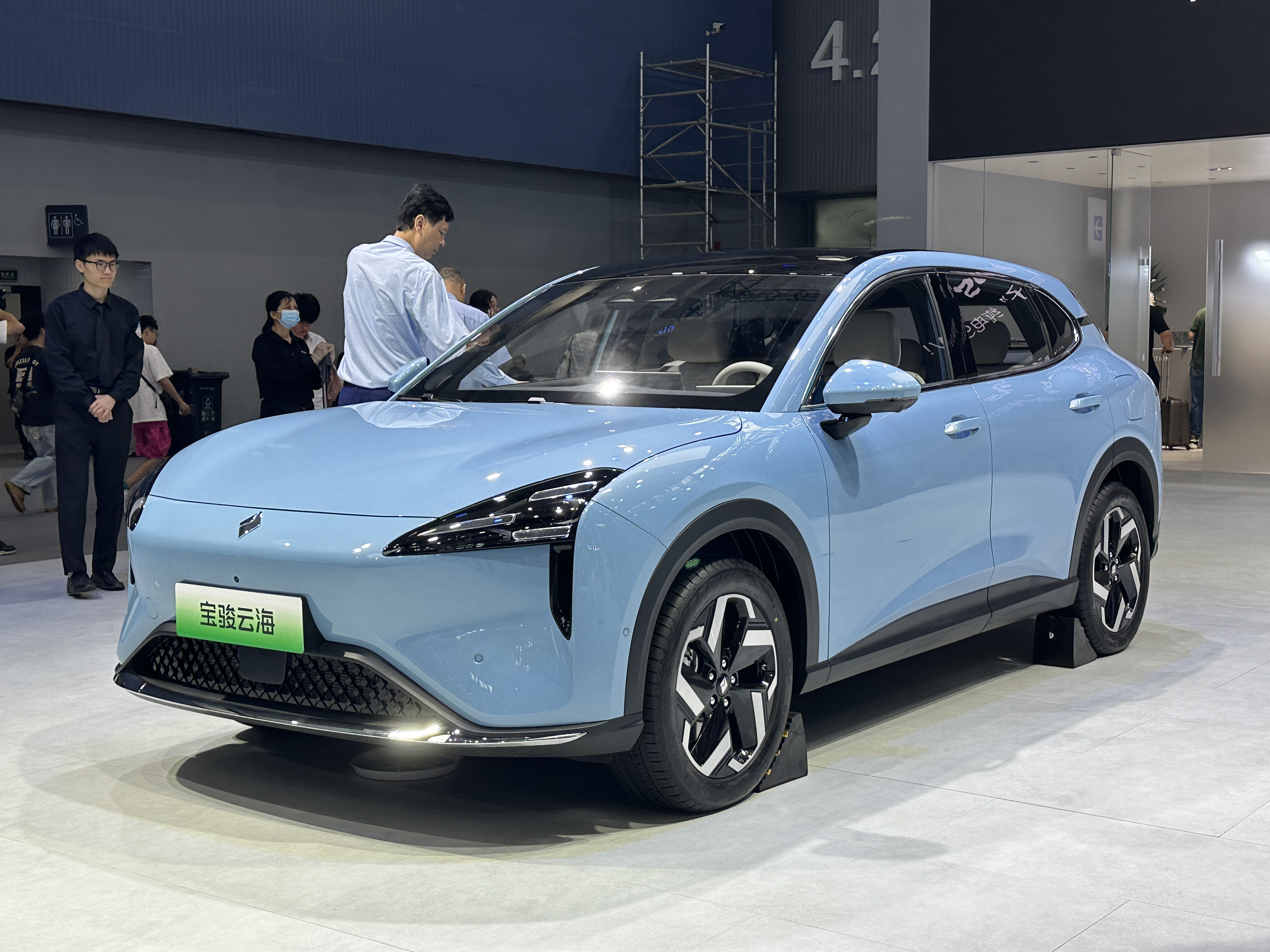
Yunhai

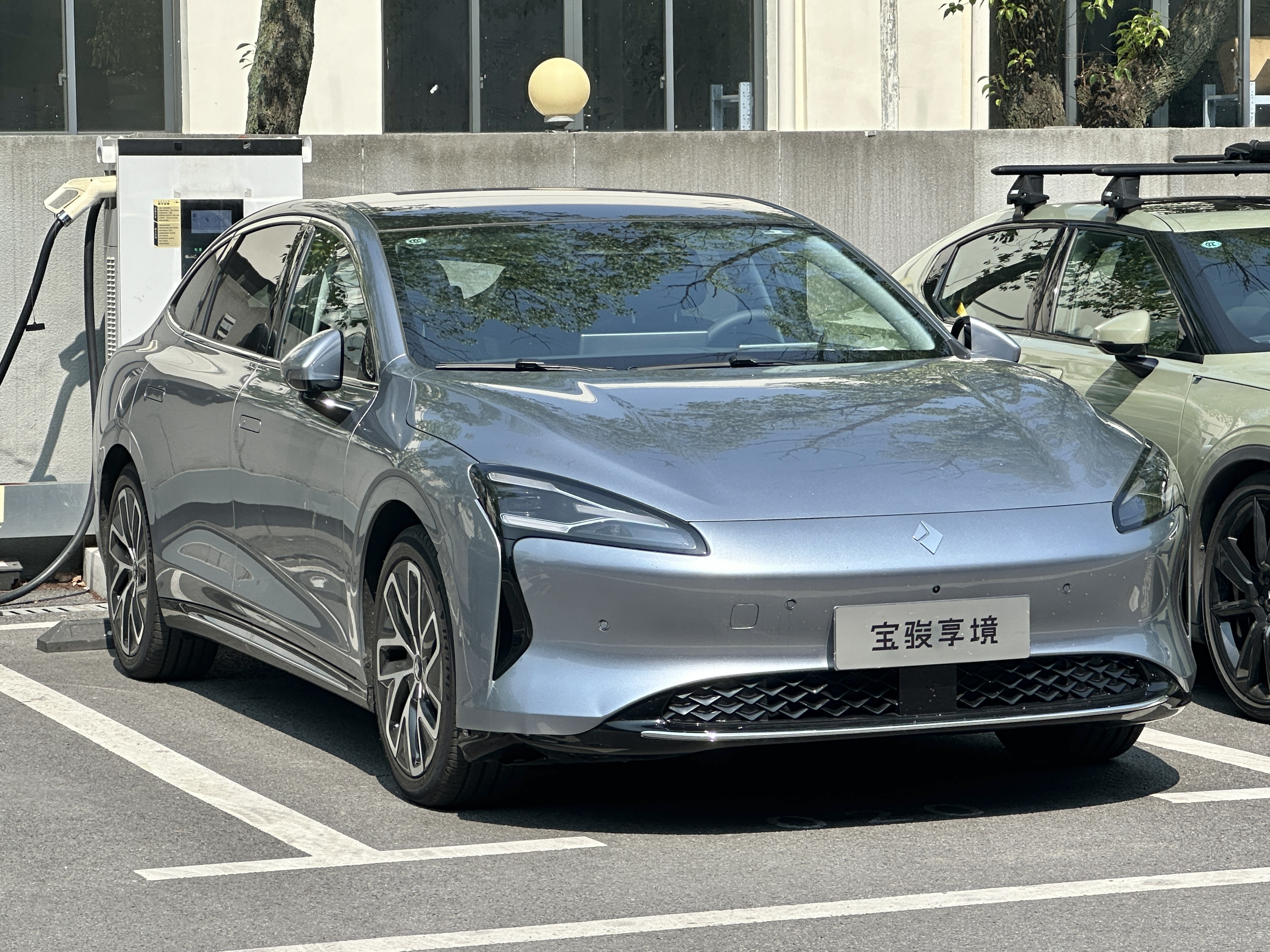
Xiangjing

== Operations ==
The company has a number of production bases in China. These include a facility in Liuzhou, Guangxi, and a plant in Qingdao, which it had purchased in 2007.

=== Overseas operations ===
In 2010, GM and SAIC established an equally-owned joint venture, General Motors India, which assembled some SGMW products to India until General Motors stopped selling cars in India at the end of 2017.

On August 20, 2015, SGMW established PT SGMW Motor Indonesia (Wuling Motors), which laid the first stone of a new manufacturing facility in Cikarang, West Java, Indonesia. The facility spans 600,000 square meters, set aside for the production and manufacture of motor vehicles in Indonesia and to set up an export base for Southeast Asia. The investment of the project is around US$700 million. At peak capacity, the plant is expected to produce up to 150,000 vehicles in a year and estimated to create estimated 3,000 jobs. On July 11, 2017, the facility starts its operations for mass production. The first product under the brand Wuling Motors for Indonesian market is Wuling Hongguang S1, renamed as the Wuling Confero. In 2018, SGMW Indonesia launched Baojun 730 as the Wuling Cortez. In 2019, SGMW Indonesia introduced Baojun 530, renamed as Wuling Almaz as their first SUV.

=== Export ===
In 2009, Wuling began to export its small commercial vehicles to South America, the Middle East, and North Africa where they are sold under the Chevrolet brand. The first such vehicles were sent to Peru in July 2009. In 2014, SGMW started exporting the Baojun 610 to Egypt (as knock-down kits) and Algeria as the Chevrolet Optra. SGMW started exporting SUVs to Middle East and Latin America such as the Baojun 530 as the Chevrolet Captiva since 2019, followed by the Baojun 510 as the Chevrolet Groove since 2020.

Wuling mini-trucks were exported in limited numbers to the United States from 2004 to 2005. SGMW USA, a Cobra Motors company, imported and distributed the vehicles. Those trucks were limited to off-road use (i.e. private property), and were primarily marketed as industrial and commercial vehicles.

== Sales ==
Year	Passenger car	Total
2009		1,065,050
2010		1,234,508
2011	295,263	1,301,118
2012	426,545	1,458,188
2013	596,749	1,600,550
2014	932,614	1,805,850
2015	1,181,810	2,040,007
2016	1,427,921	2,130,177
2017	1,555,224	2,150,018
2018	1,355,615	2,071,551
2019	980,668	1,660,007
2020	835,216	1,600,057
2021	1,039,938	1,660,166
2022	1,049,291	1,600,007
2023	689,724	1,403,066
2024	745,276	1,540,077
2025	899,727	1,635,066

== See also ==
- SAIC-GM
- Wuling Motors
- Automobile manufacturers and brands of China
- List of automobile manufacturers of China
