= RS7 =

RS7 or RS-7 may refer to:

- Audi RS 7, a 2013–present German performance executive car
- Baojun RS-7, a 2020–present Chinese mid-size SUV
- Raheem Sterling, footballer for Manchester City and England
