= Baojun =

Chinese automotive brand

Baojun (宝骏)
- Product type: Automobiles
- Current owner: SAIC-GM-Wuling
- Country: China
- Introduced: 2010; 16 years ago
- Markets: China
- Ambassador: Matt Tsien (Vice President of SAIC-GM-Wuling)
- Website: sgmw.com.cn/baojun

Baojun (simplified Chinese: 宝骏; traditional Chinese: 寶駿; pinyin: Bǎojùn; lit. 'Treasured Horse') is a Chinese automobile marque owned by a joint venture of General Motors (GM) and SAIC Motor, SAIC-GM-Wuling Automobile. The brand was created as a more affordable alternative to existing GM brands such as Chevrolet and Buick for the Chinese market, while being more upmarket than the Wuling brand.

== History ==
Following the success of Wuling, the SAIC-GM-Wuling announced the creation of a second car brand, Baojun in November 2010 as a cheaper alternative to existing GM brands Chevrolet and Buick, which are also on sale in China. The company's products compete with domestic Chinese manufacturers such as Chery, Geely, Changan, Haval and Trumpchi.

The first Baojun model introduced to the market was the four-door compact sedan 630, which debuted at a price point of approximately $7,000 USD in November 2010. The development of the Baojun 630 involved significant input from designers at General Motors. Sales started in late 2011 through a dedicated dealer network. The joint venture also offered a localized version of the Daewoo Matiz / Chevrolet Spark, known as the Baojun Lechi. In 2014, a third model (the Baojun 610) was announced at Auto China. At Auto Shanghai in 2015, the company introduced the Baojun 560 SUV. In July 2014, SAIC-GM-Wuling launched the Baojun 730, a seven-seater MPV.

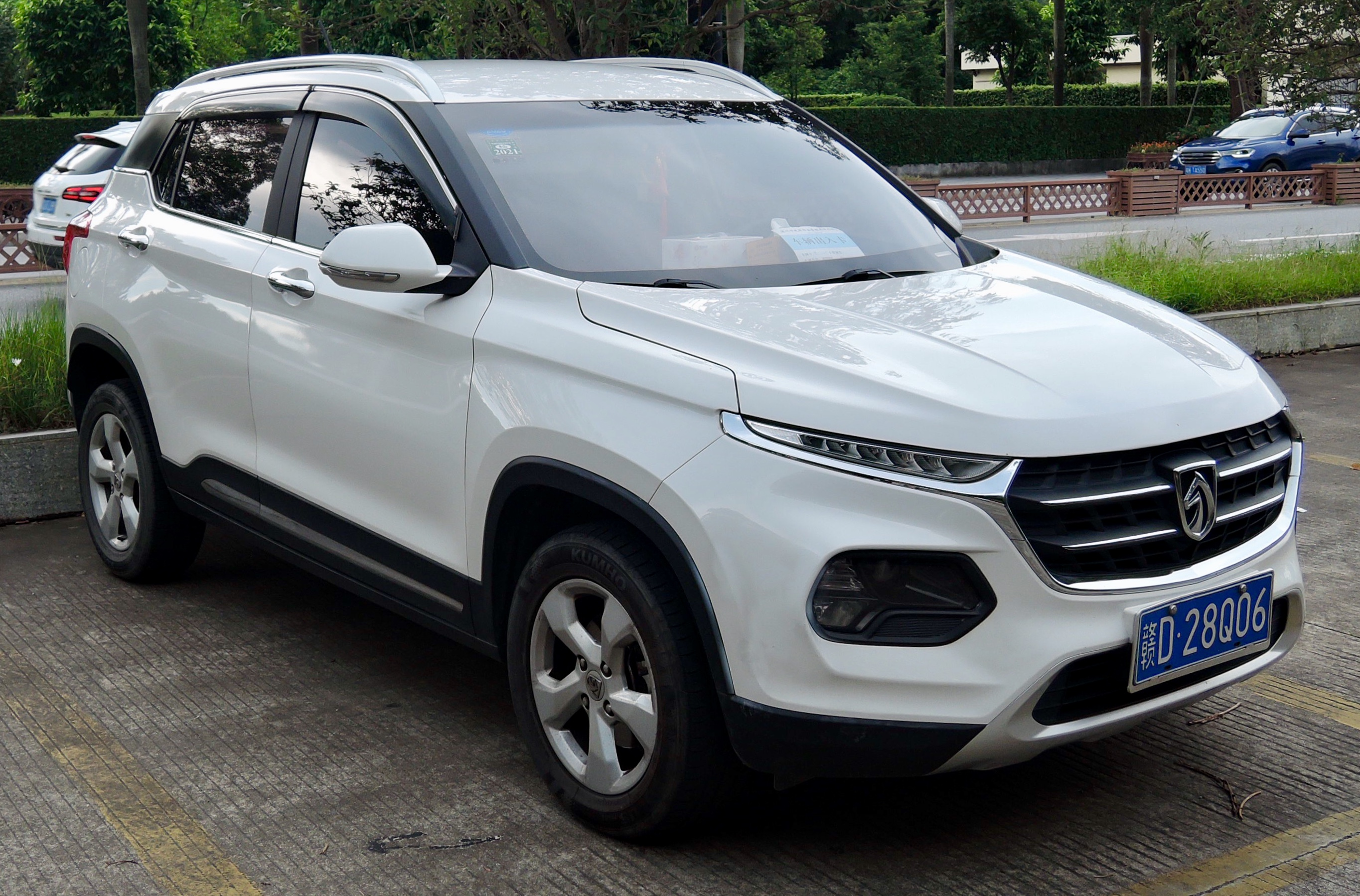
The Baojun 510 is the most successful Baojun model, with over 700,000 units sold in two years.

Baojun sold 688,390 vehicles in 2016. In late 2016, Baojun introduced its most successful vehicle, the Baojun 510 small SUV, which went on sale the following year. The model helped increase sales of Baojun to 996,629 in 2017. It was the best-selling crossover in China in 2018, and also the best-selling car sold by Baojun. As of June 2019, nearly 800,000 units of 510 had been sold. It is also notable for being the highest-selling new car nameplate in world's history. It recorded 416,883 sales during its first 12 months in market, the highest of any other car in the world. It took the record from the Baojun 560 which was sold 319,536 units in a 12-month period. However, this growth was not sustained, with annual sales declining by an average of 200,000 units in subsequent years.

In April 2016, Baojun began exporting vehicles, with the 630 compact sedan being sold in Egypt and Algeria under the Chevrolet brand as the second generation of the Optra model. In 2018, Baojun further diversified its lineup with the introduction of its first electric vehicle, the Baojun E100 microcar, and the Baojun 530 SUV. The electrically powered Baojun E100, which is only 2.49 meters long, was initially only available in Guangxi from August 2017. Since June 2018, it has been available throughout China with an increased range. The 530 SUV was notably the first Baojun vehicle to be marketed globally under the Chevrolet brand. The model's production was also initiated outside of China, including in India under the MG brand as the MG Hector and in Indonesia as the Wuling Almaz. The Baojun 360 MPV went on sale in May 2018. Since September 2018, the Baojun E200, an electric microcar, has been sold in China.

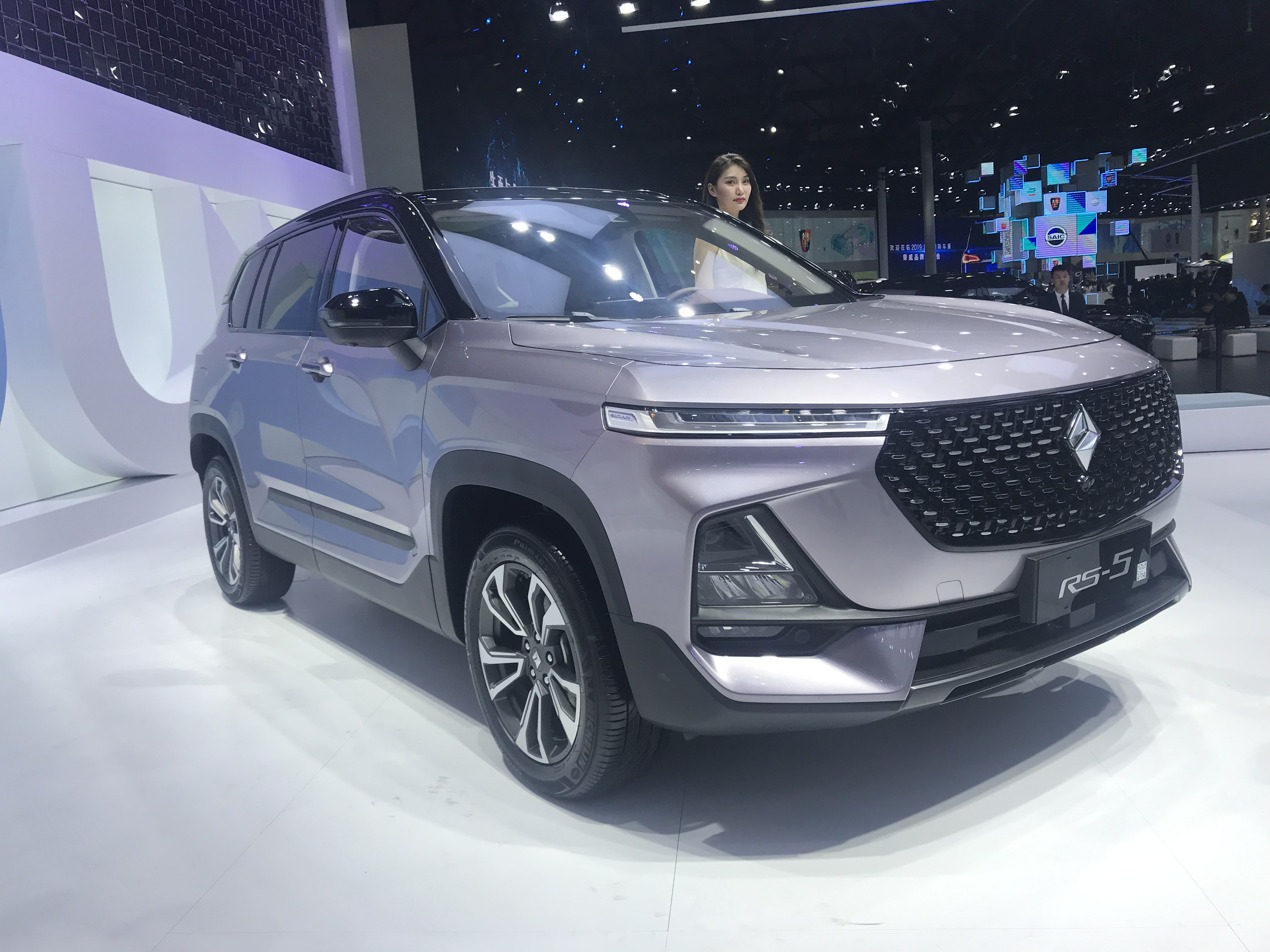
The Baojun RS-5 is the first model under the New Baojun strategy.

In January 2019, Baojun introduced a new model strategy called "New Baojun," which aimed to provide vehicles with more avant-garde styling and expand its lineup with higher-end models featuring enhanced equipment. Alongside this strategy, the company updated its logo, replacing the previous shield with a horse image, with a minimalist diamond-shaped horse profile. Under this new approach, Baojun introduced a new naming convention for its models: passenger cars were given the prefix "RC," SUVs and crossovers "RS," and minivans "RM." The Baojun RS-5, the brand's fourth SUV, was presented at the Guangzhou Auto Show in November 2018. In June 2019, the Baojun RC-6 based on the RS-5 was introduced. In September 2019, the Baojun RM-5 MPV was introduced. Baojun presented the Baojun RS-3 SUV at the end of October 2019. In 2020, the Baojun E300 microcar, the Baojun RS-7 and the Baojun RC-5 sedan were introduced.

Despite these efforts, the "New Baojun" strategy did not result in increased market interest. Instead, the brand experienced a significant decline in demand, leading to the discontinuation of several newly introduced models within just 2-3 years of their debut. This decline was exacerbated by growing concerns over the reliability of earlier models. As a result, the role of an affordable combustion vehicle brand within the SAIC-GM-Wuling portfolio was taken over by the sister brand Wuling. In 2021, Baojun adjusted its naming strategy by adopting proper names, renaming the RC-5W model as Baojun Valli and the E300/E300 Plus electric hatchback as Baojun KiWi EV.

In 2023, Baojun shifted its focus entirely to electrification, phasing out all models from the previous decade except for the city car KiWi EV. The brand renewed its lineup with electric models, starting with the introduction of the small Baojun Yep SUV, followed by the Baojun Yunduo compact hatchback later in the year. In 2024, the lineup was further expanded with a larger, five-door alternative to the Yep, named Yep Plus, and a plug-in hybrid and electric SUV, the Baojun Yunhai.

On 26 March 2025, Baojun officially became a "Smart Mobility Partner" of China Media Group, marking the entry of its intelligent driving achievements into the mainstream national narrative. In April of the same year, Baojun's first "intelligent and ultra-comfortable flagship family sedan," the Baojun Xiangjing, was successfully launched at the Shanghai International Auto Show. Meanwhile, Gong Jun, the young actor and global brand ambassador for Baojun, also attended the press conference in a new capacity.

== Products ==
=== Current products ===
- Baojun Yep (2023–present), mini SUV, BEV
  - Baojun Yep Plus (2024–present), enlarged variant of Yep, also sold as Chevrolet Spark EUV
- Baojun Yunhai (2024–present), compact SUV, PHEV/BEV
- Baojun Xiangjing (2025–present), mid-size sedan, PHEV/BEV
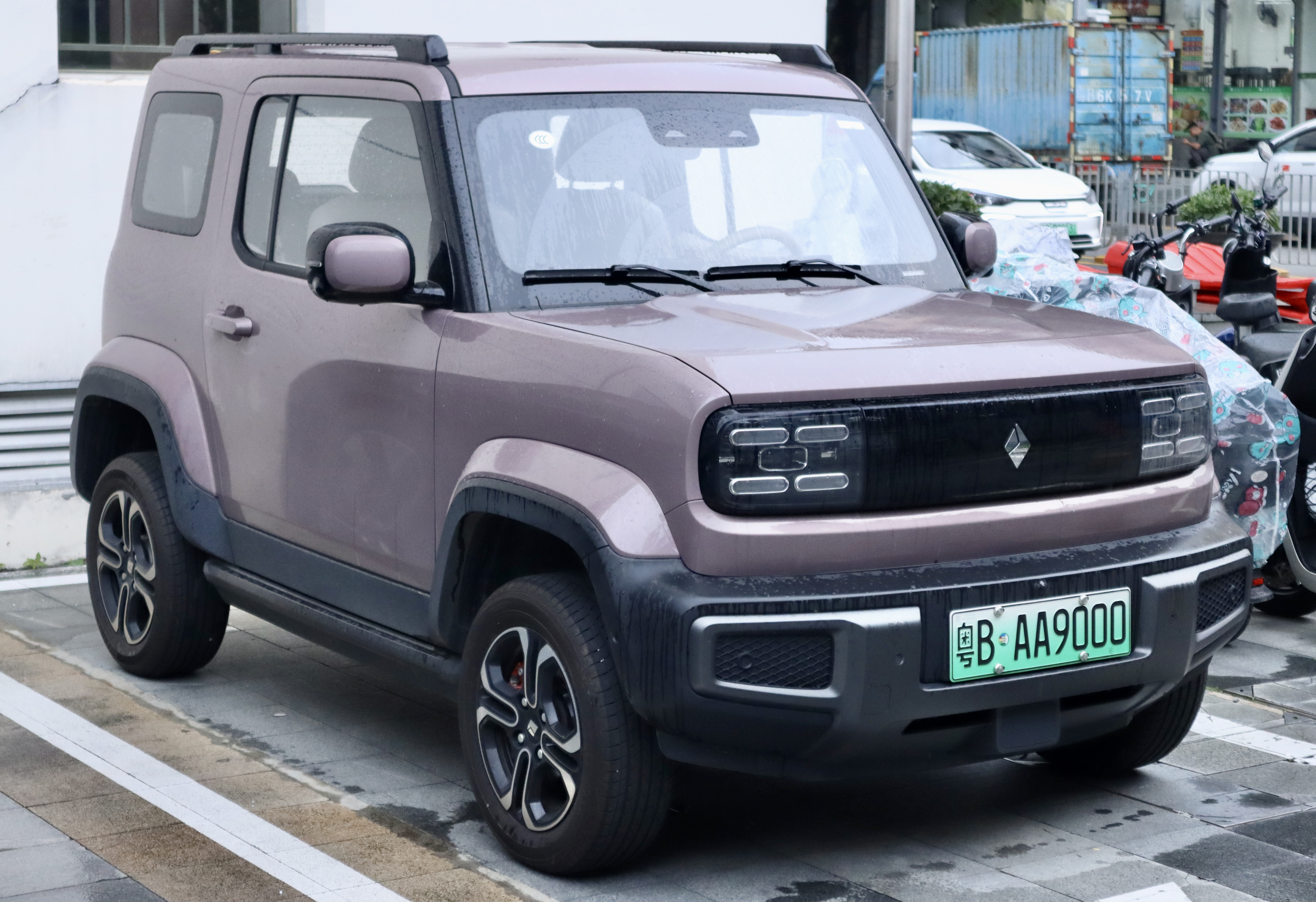
Baojun Yep

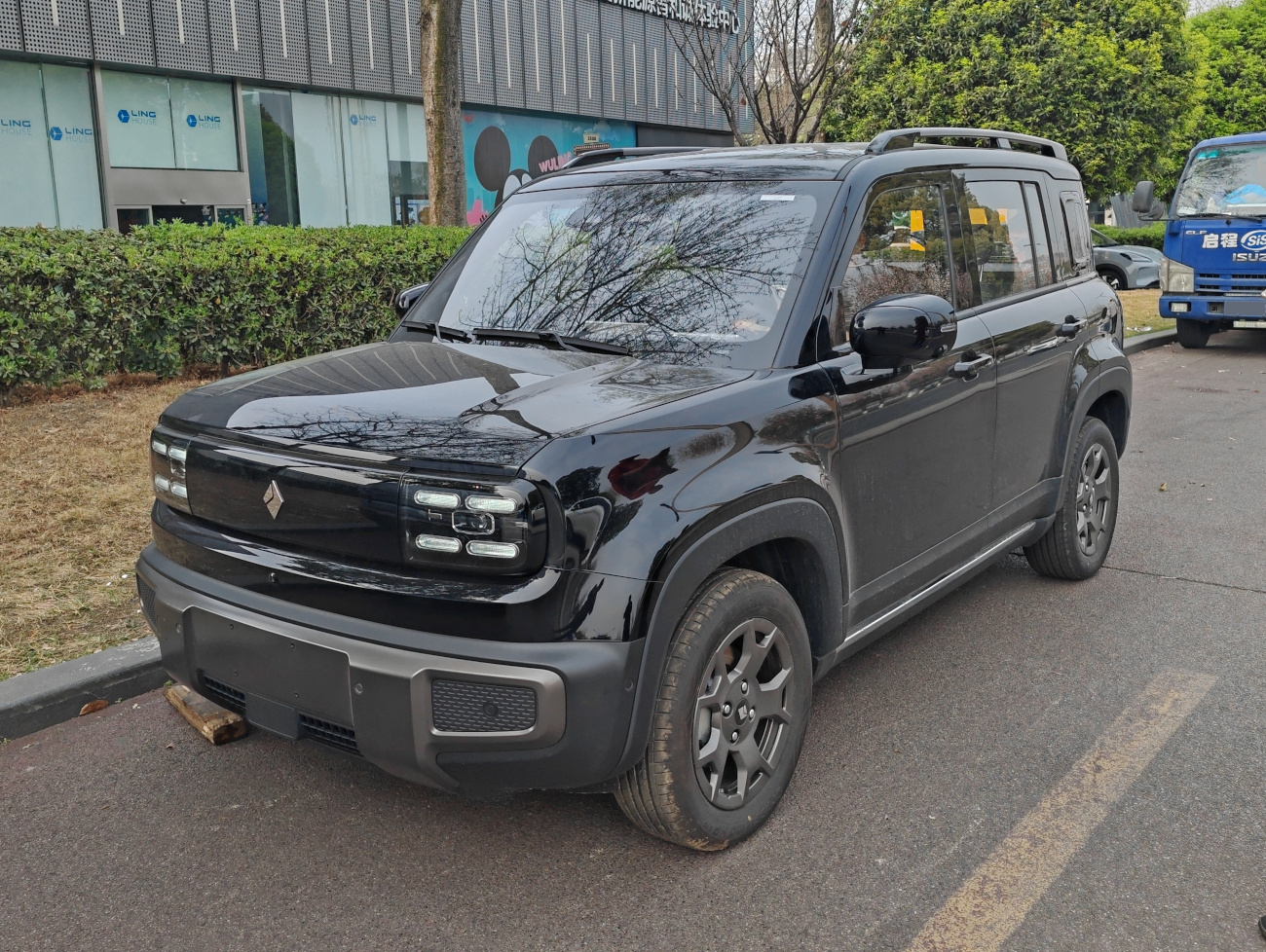
Baojun Yep Plus

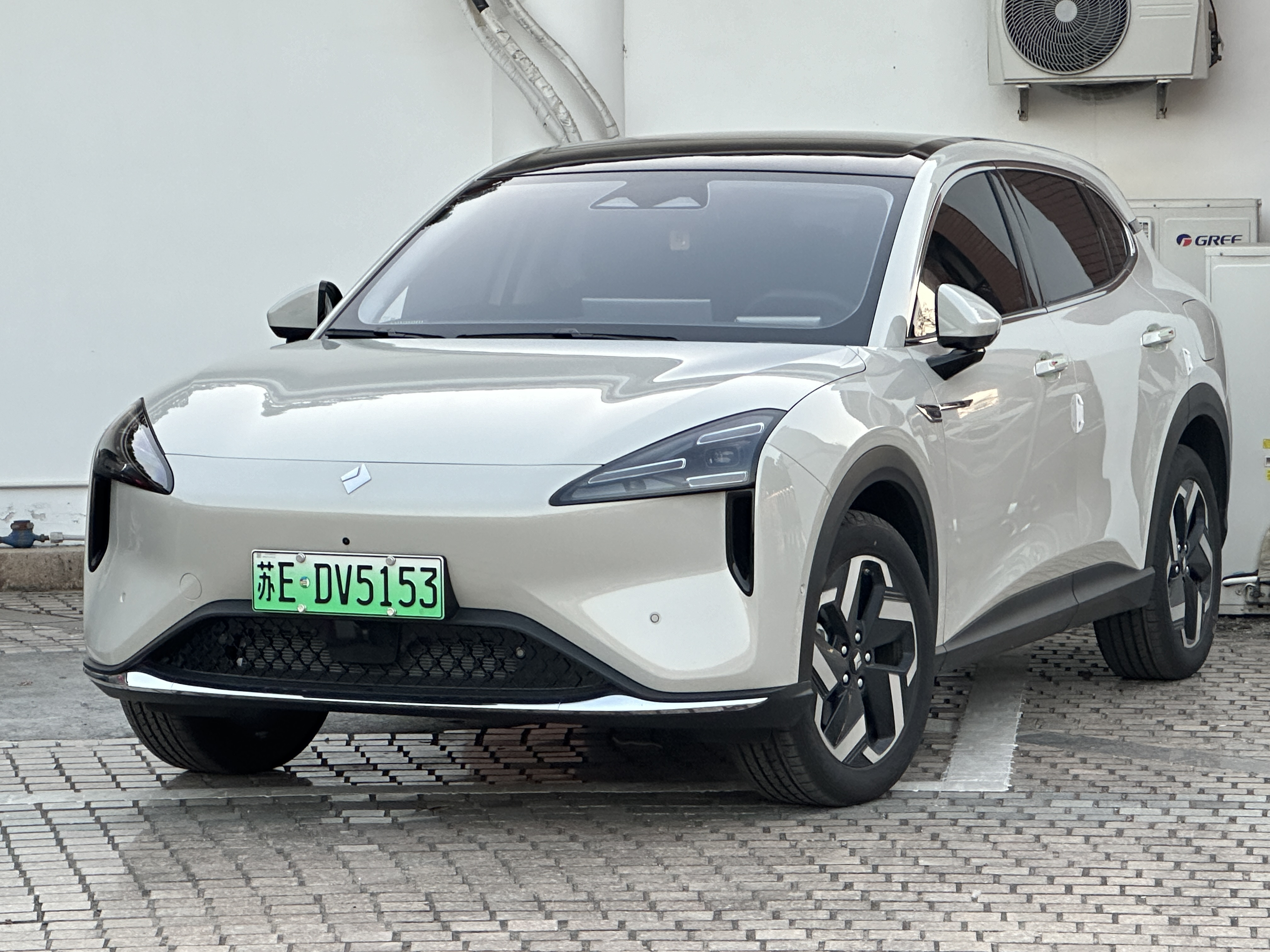
Baojun Yunhai

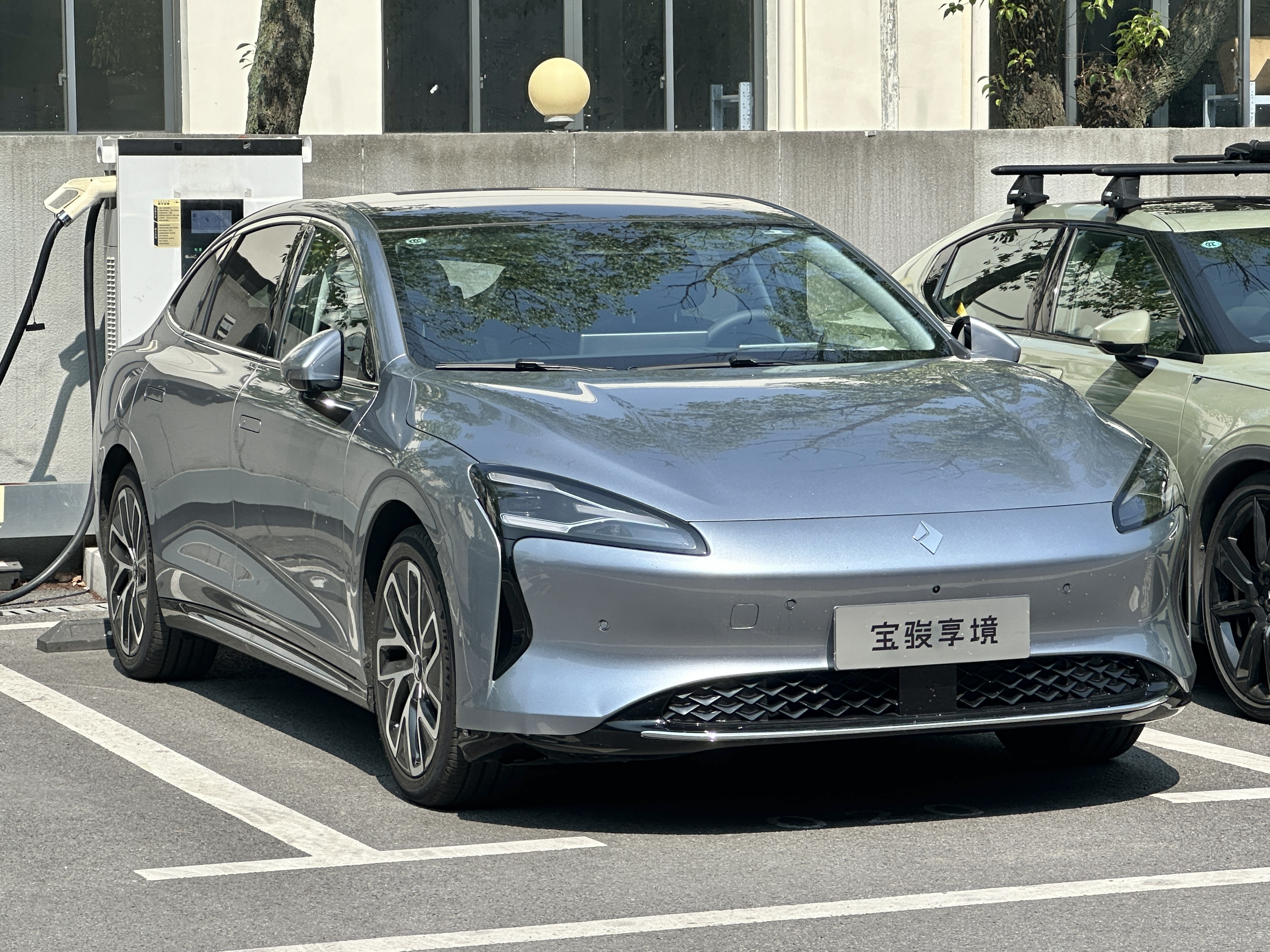
Baojun Xiangjing

=== Former products ===
- Baojun E100 (2017–2021), city car
- Baojun E200 (2018–2021), city car
- Baojun KiWi EV (2021–2025), city car, BEV
- Baojun Yunduo (2023–2025), compact car, BEV, also sold as Wuling Cloud EV and MG Windsor EV
- Baojun Lechi (2008–2021), city car
- Baojun 310 (2016–2020), subcompact car
  - Baojun 310W (2017–2020), station wagon variant of Baojun 310
  - Baojun 330 (2016–2017), sedan variant of Baojun 310
- Baojun 630 (2011–2019), compact sedan
  - Baojun 610 (2014–2019), hatchback variant of Baojun 630
- Baojun RC-5 (2020–2021), compact sedan
  - Baojun RC-5W (2020–2021), wagon variant of Baojun RC-5
  - Baojun Valli (2020–2021), wagon variant of Baojun RC-5
- Baojun RC-6 (2019–2021), mid-size coupe
- Baojun RS-3 (2020–2022), subcompact SUV
- Baojun 510 (2017–2021), subcompact SUV, also exported as Chevrolet Groove
- Baojun 530 (2018–2021), compact SUV, also exported as Chevrolet Captiva, MG Hector, and Wuling Almaz
- Baojun 560 (2015–2017), compact SUV
- Baojun RM-5 (2019–2021), mid-size SUV
- Baojun RS-5 (2019–2021), compact SUV
- Baojun RS-7 (2020–2022), mid-size SUV
- Baojun 360 (2018–2021), compact MPV
- Baojun 730 (2014–2021), compact MPV, also exported as Wuling Cortez
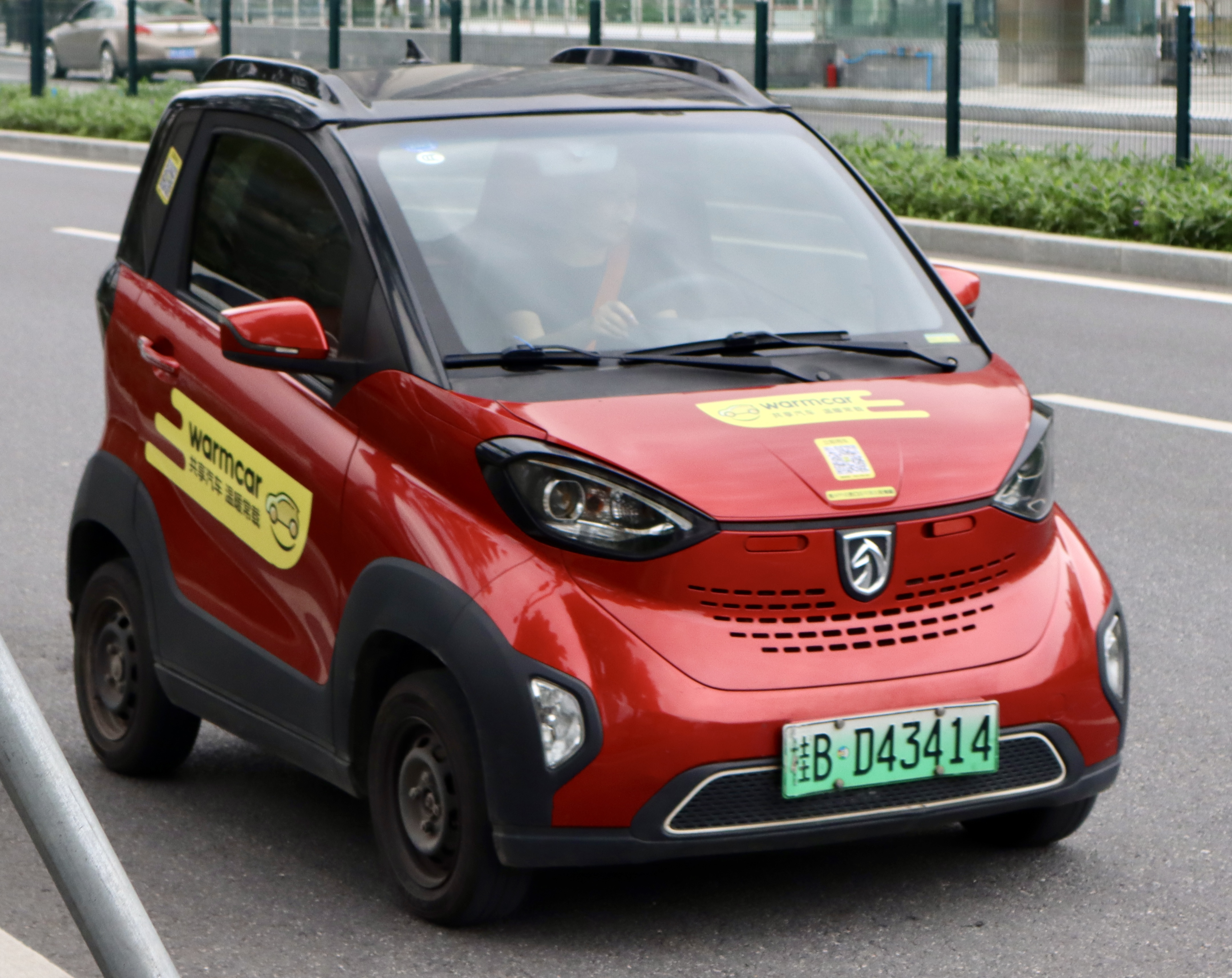
Baojun E100

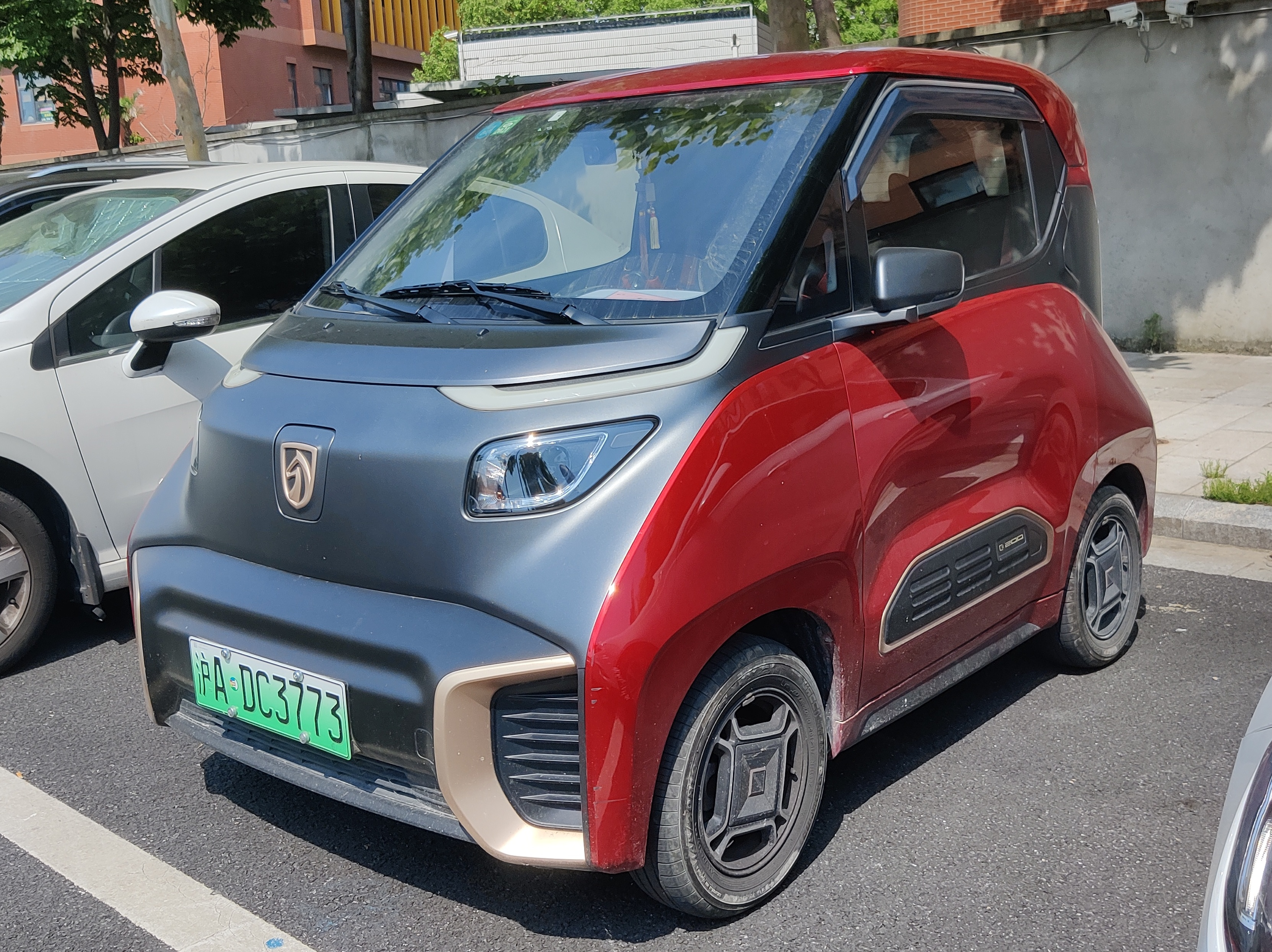
Baojun E200

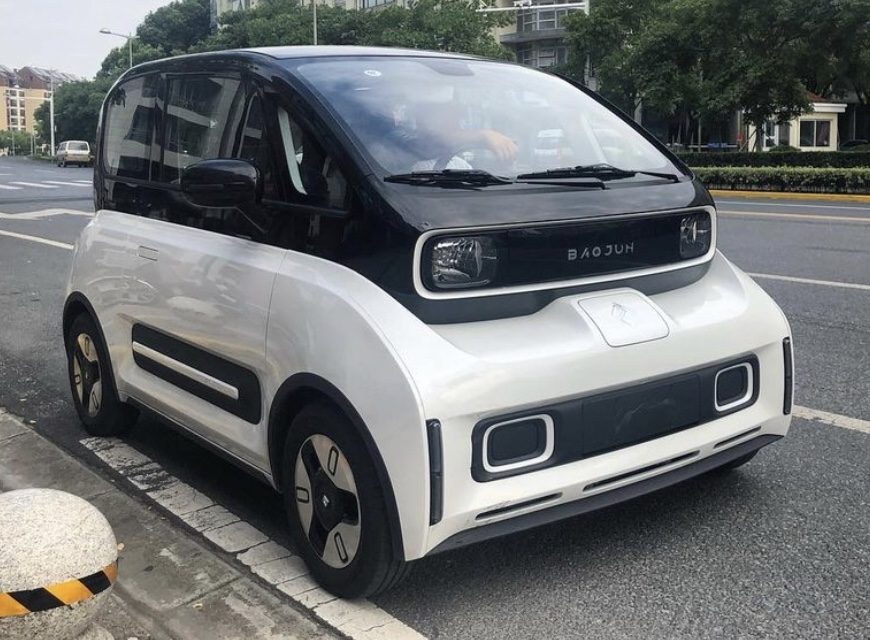
Baojun Kiwi EV

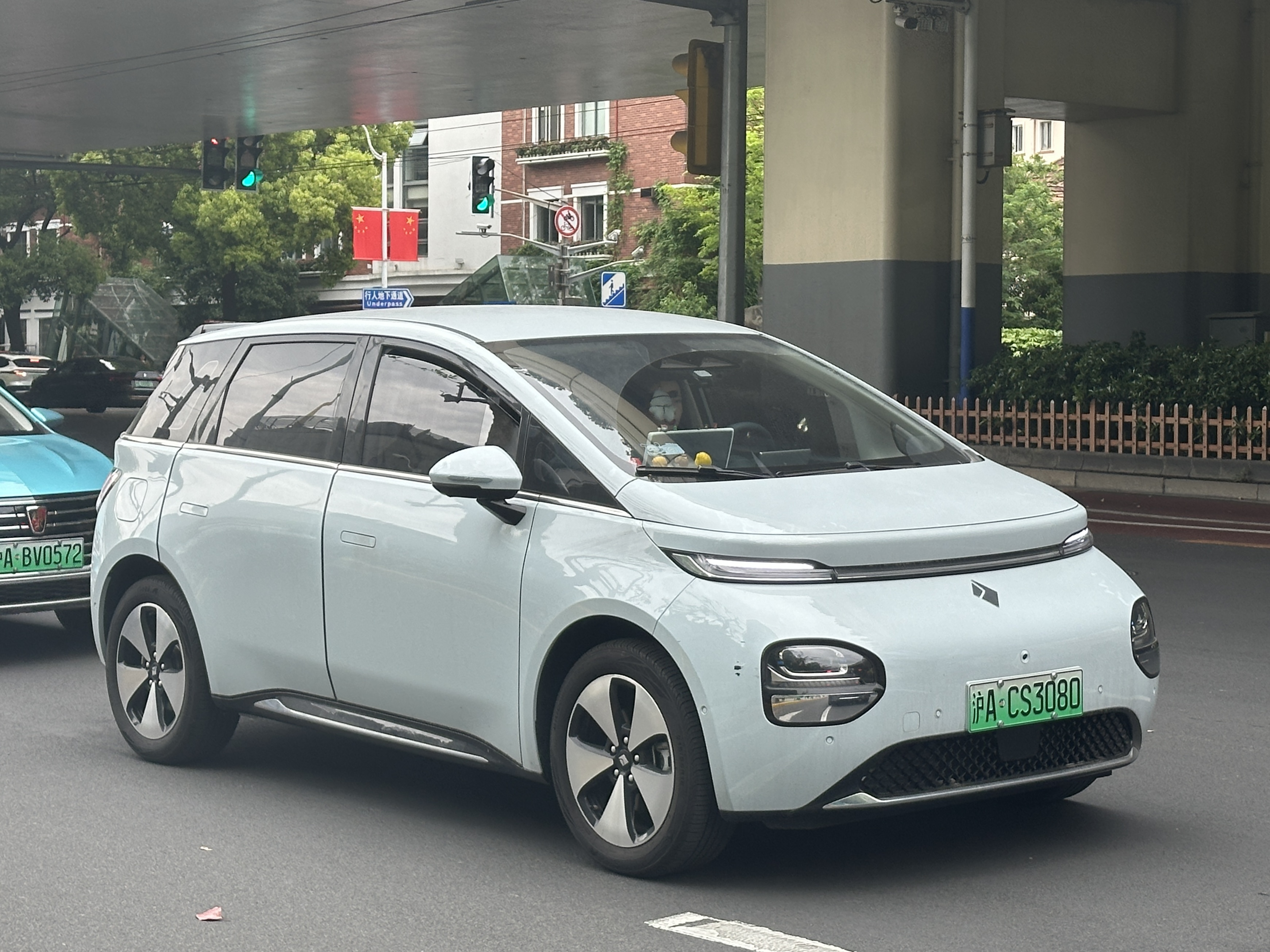
Baojun Yunduo

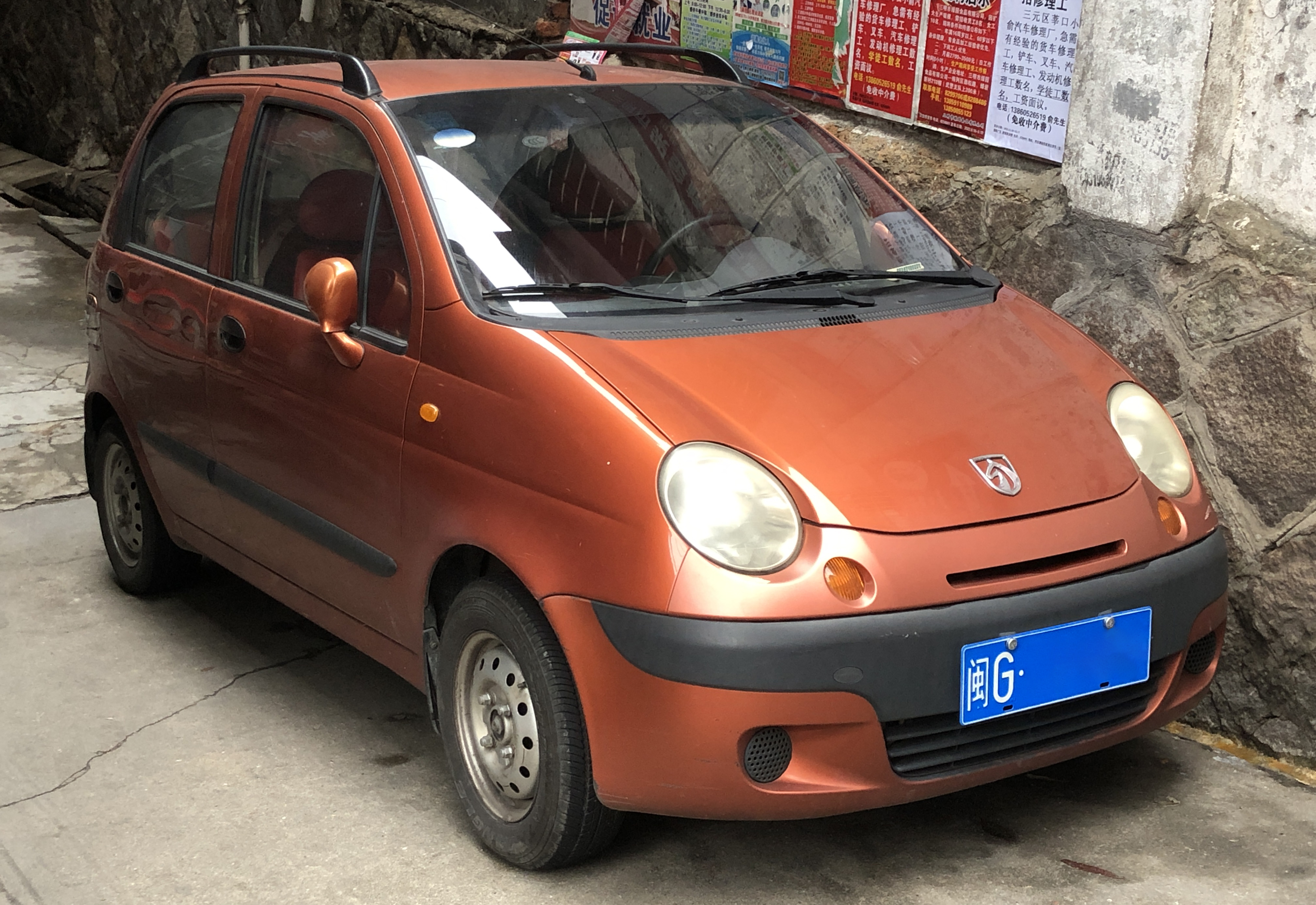
Baojun Lechi

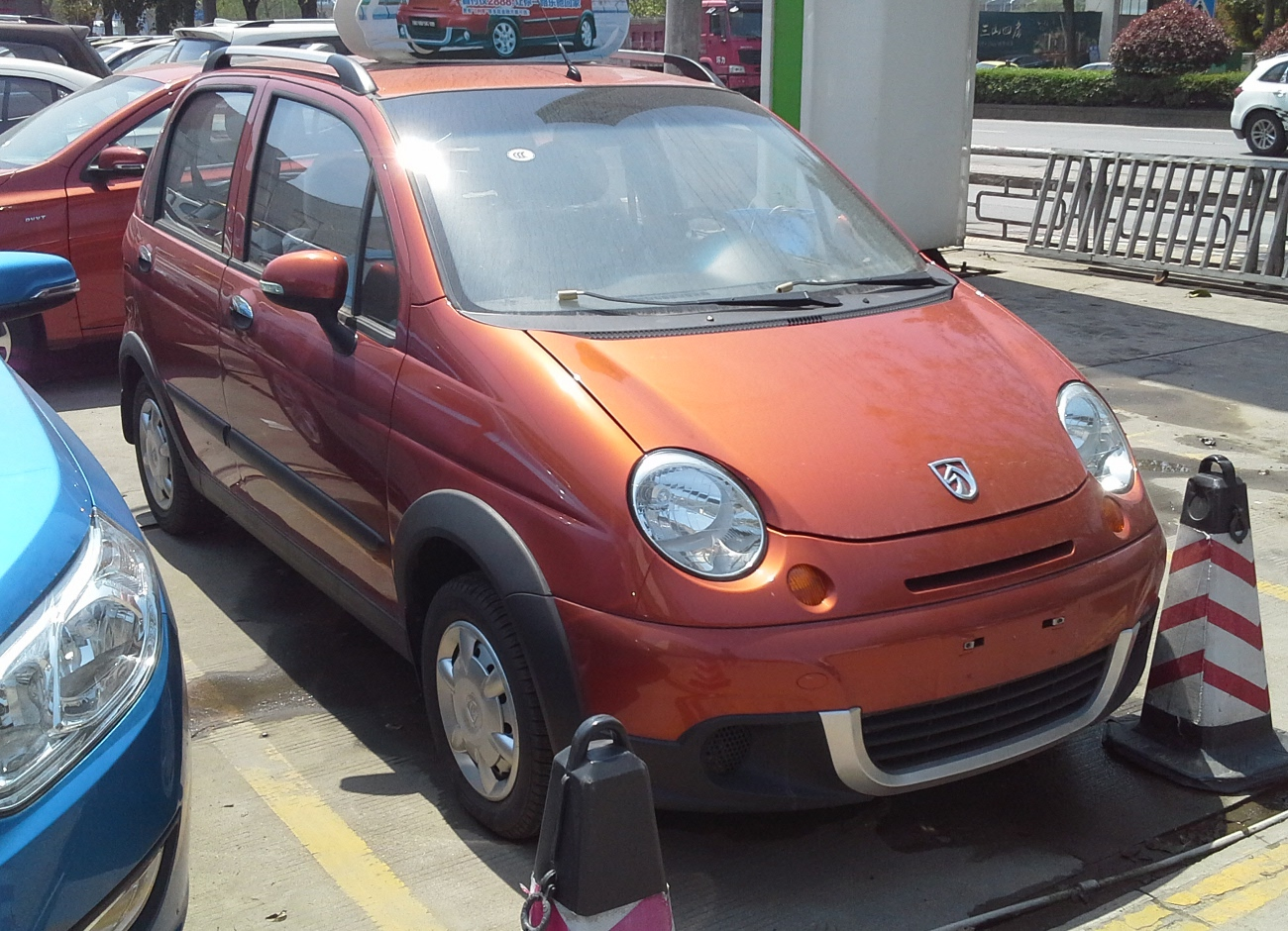
Baojun Lechi Cross

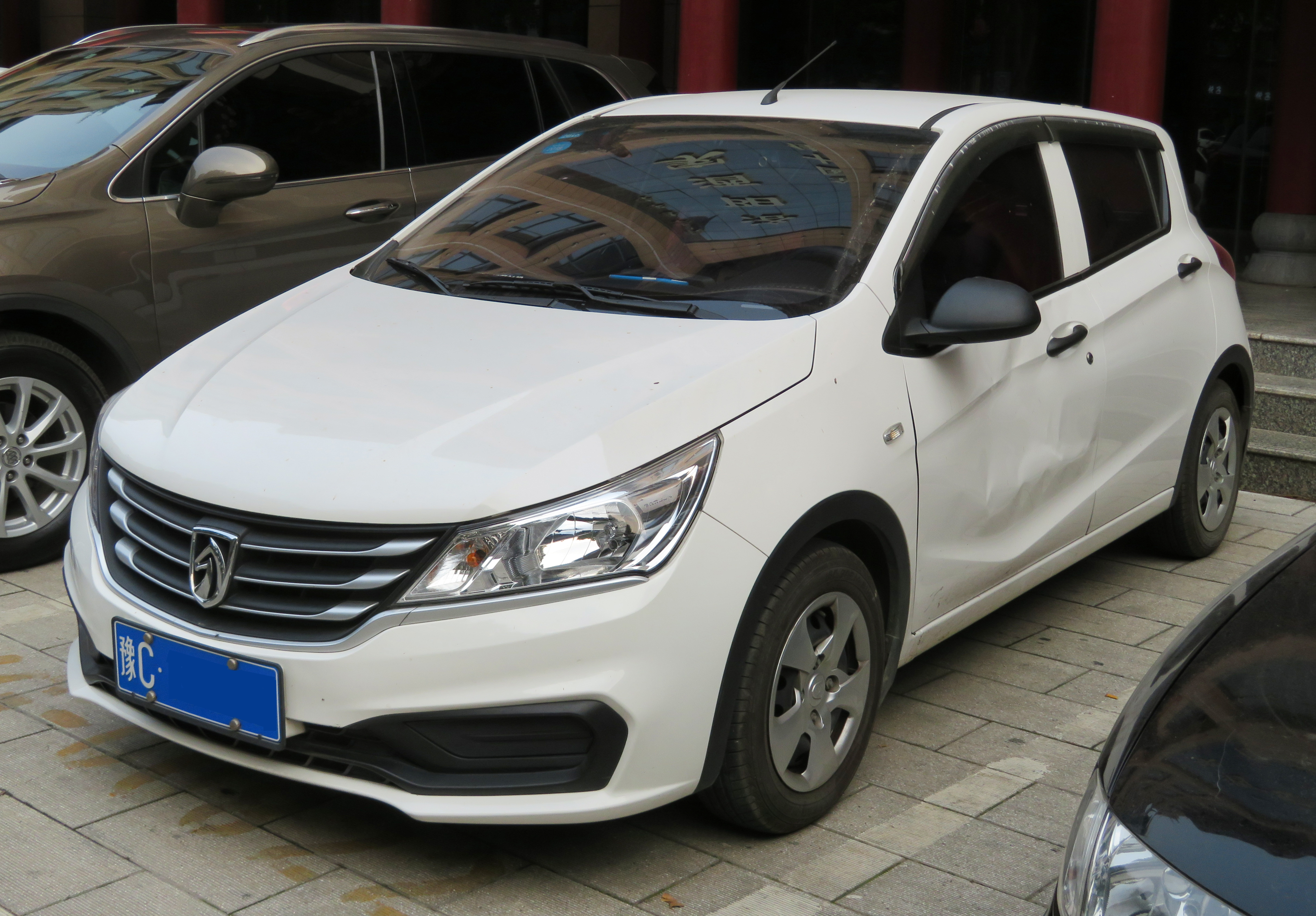
Baojun 310

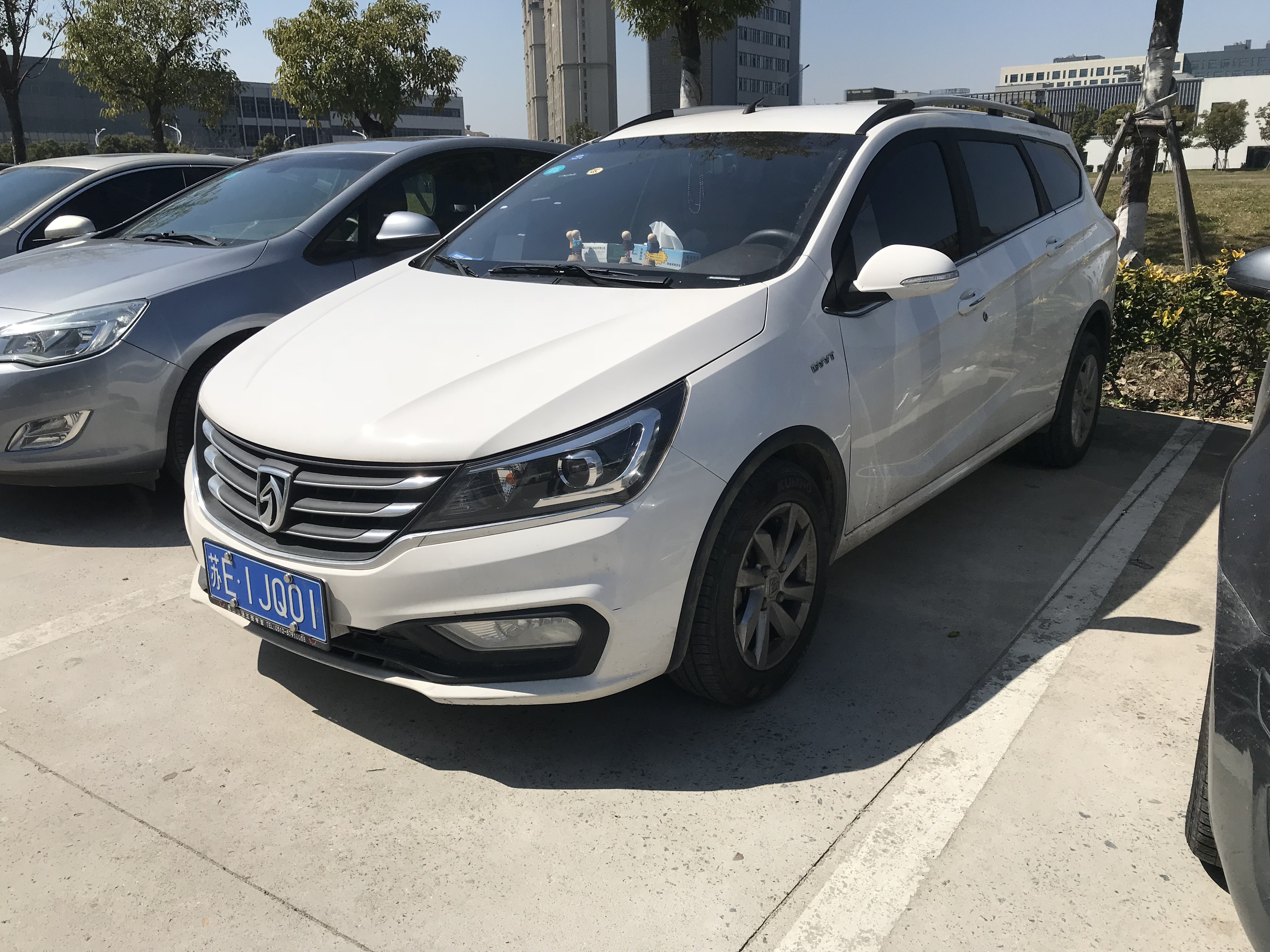
Baojun 310W

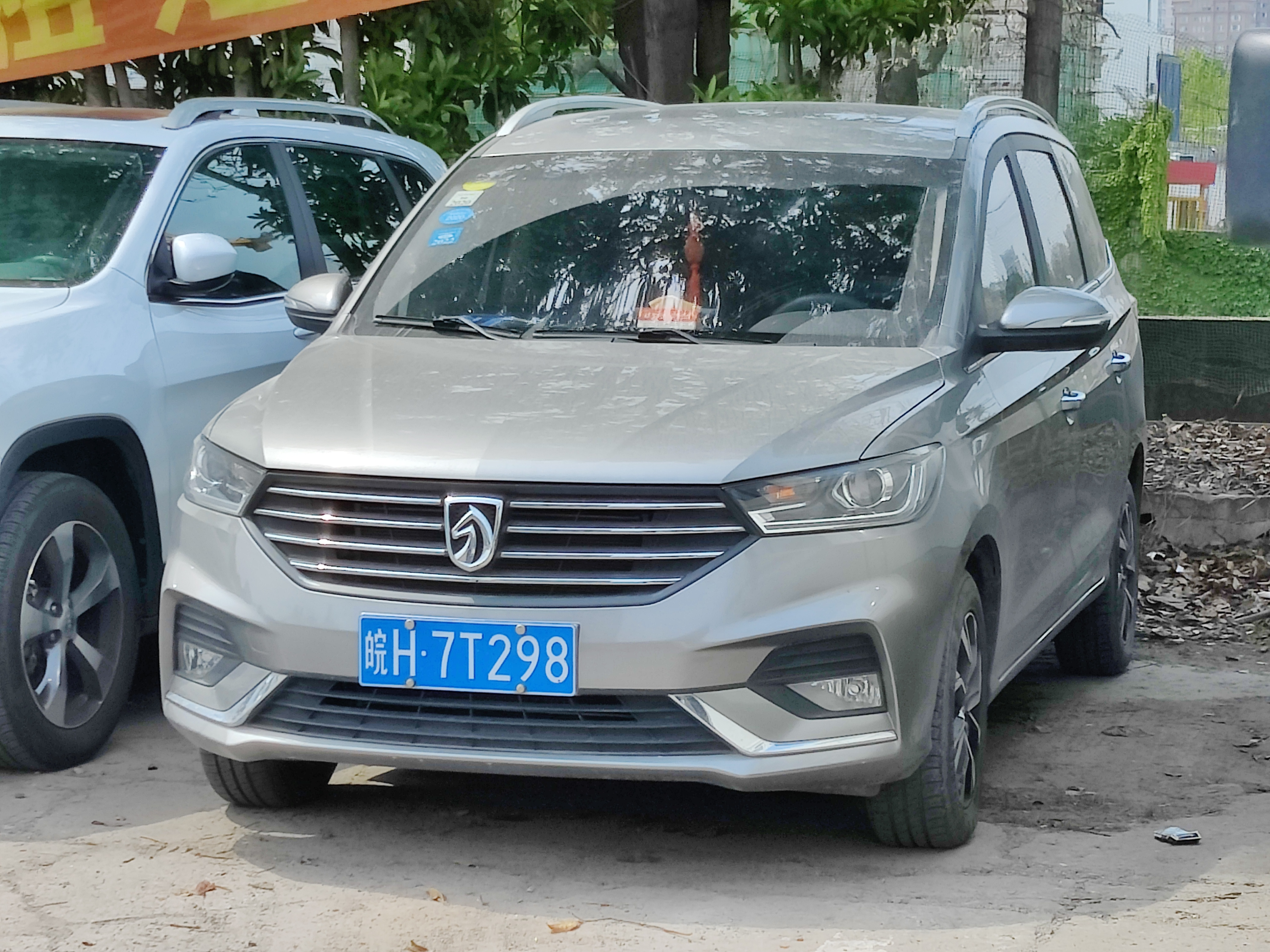
Baojun 360

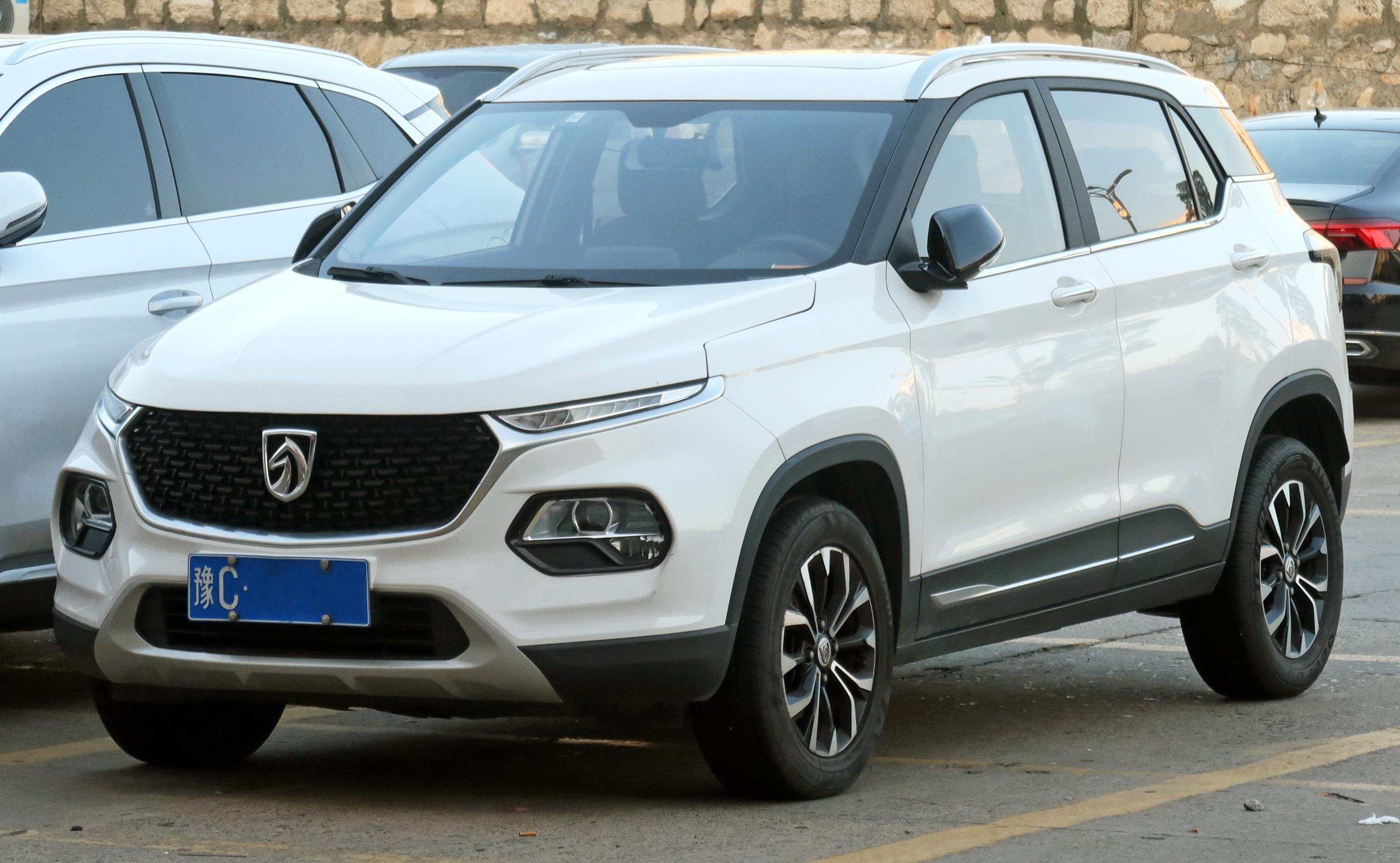
Baojun 510

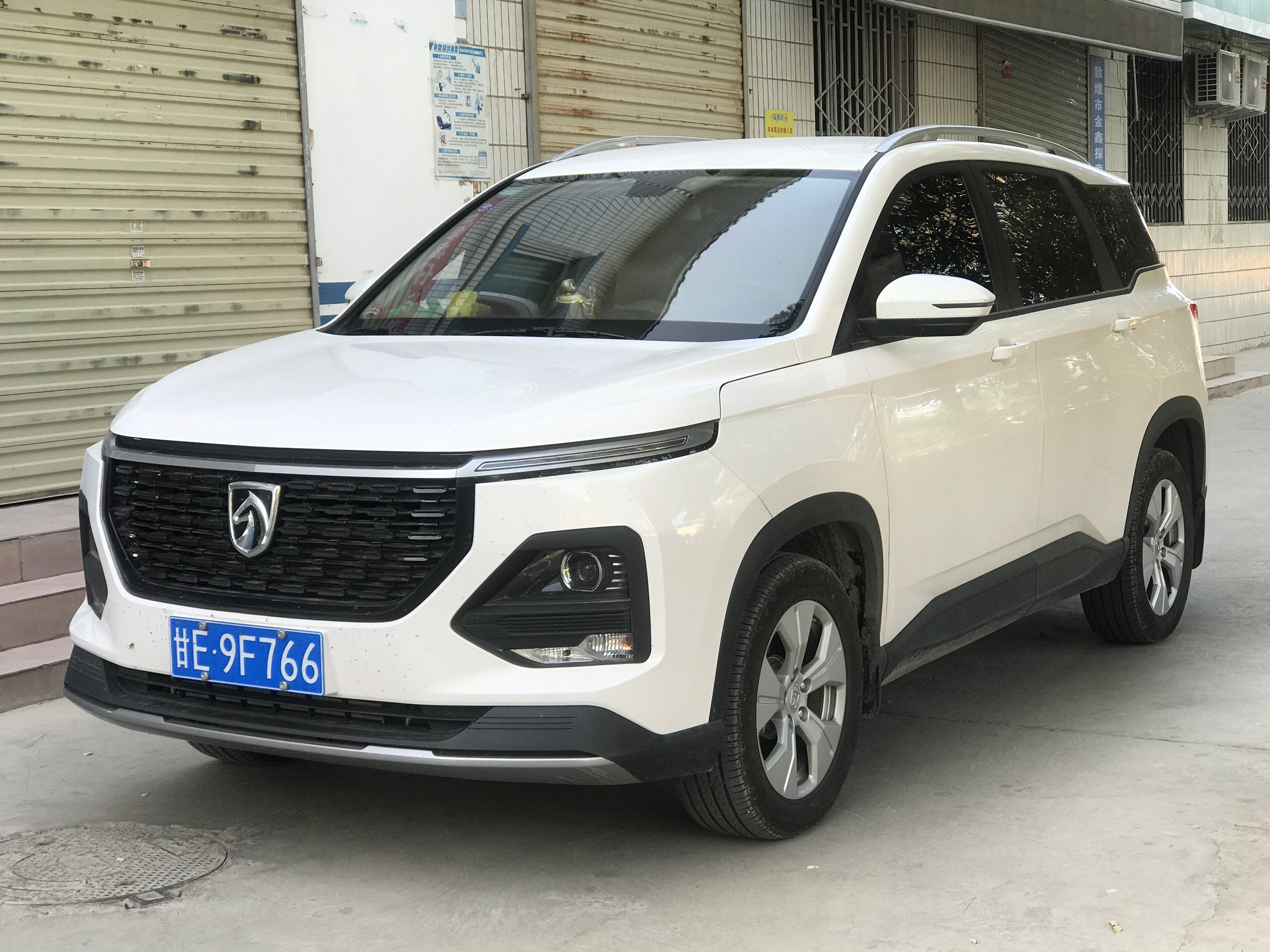
Baojun 530

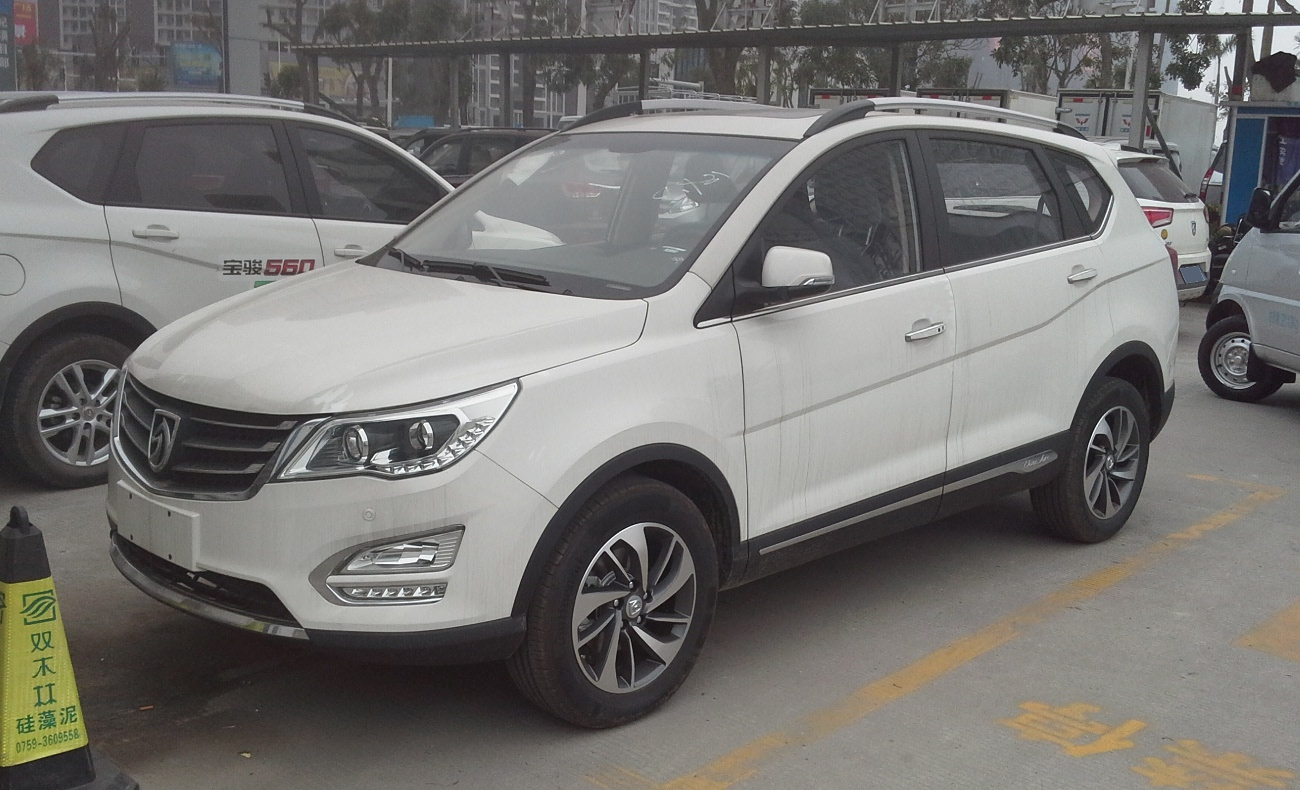
Baojun 560

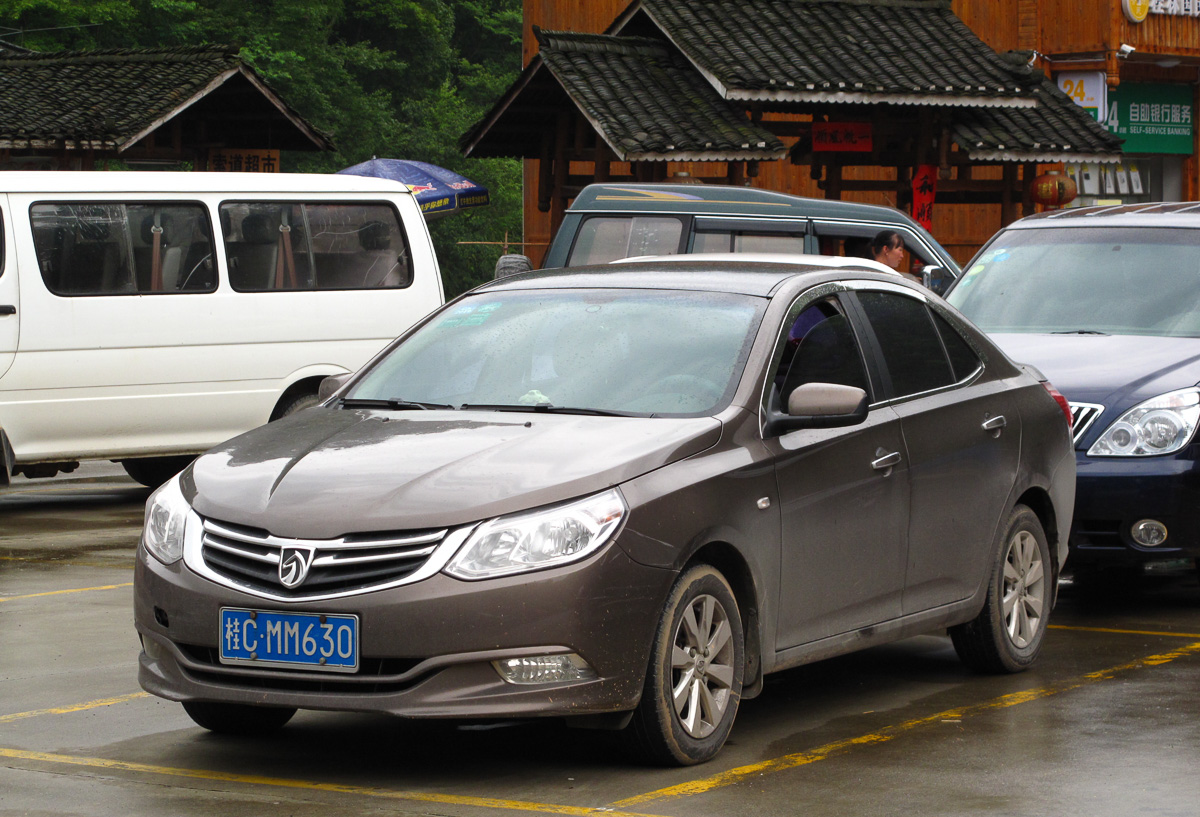
Baojun 630

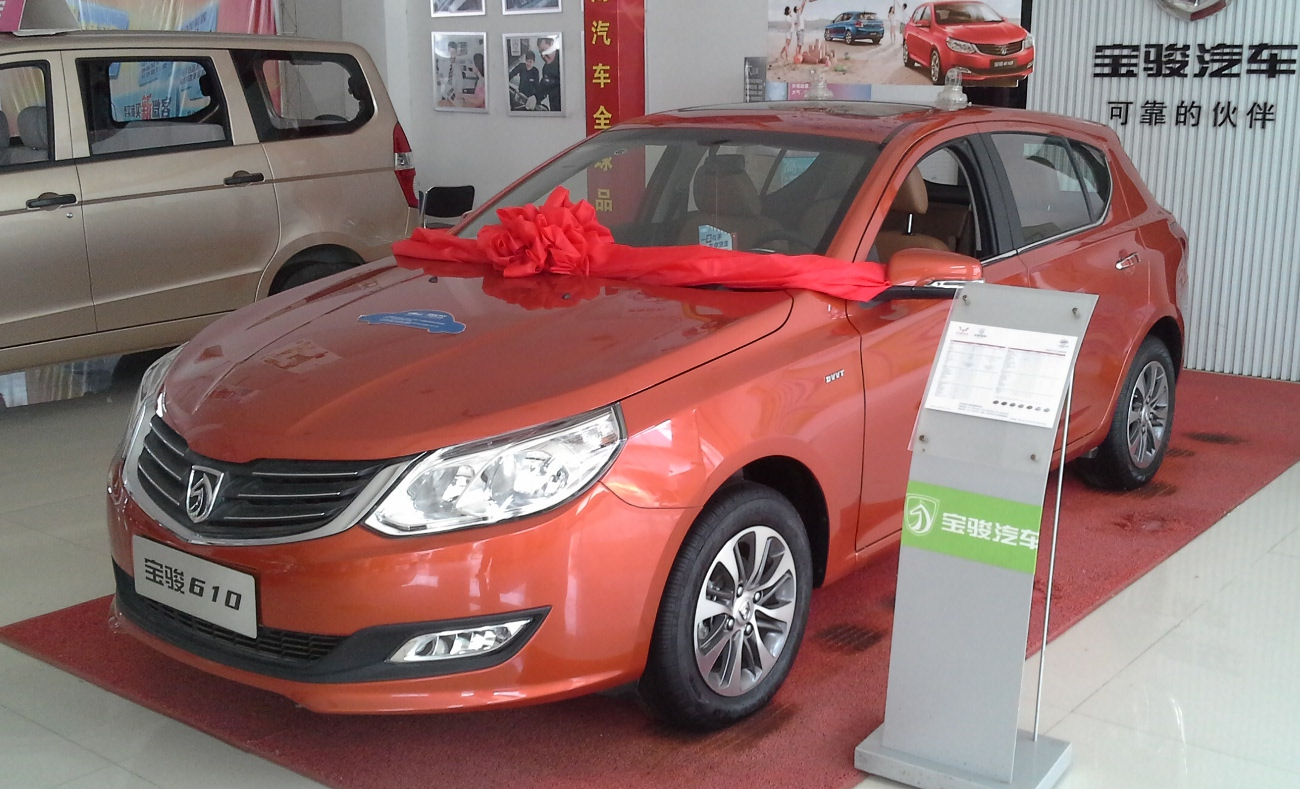
Baojun 610

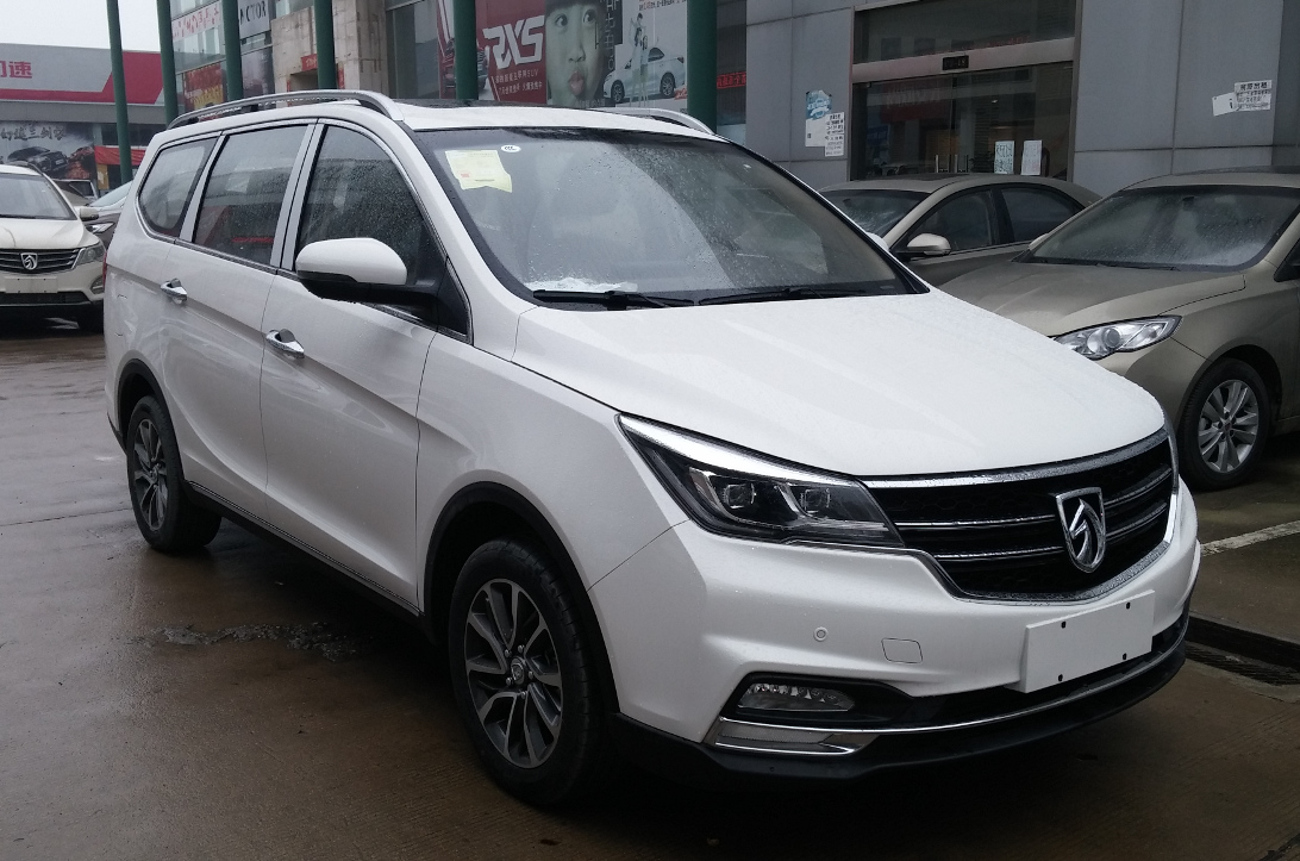
Baojun 730

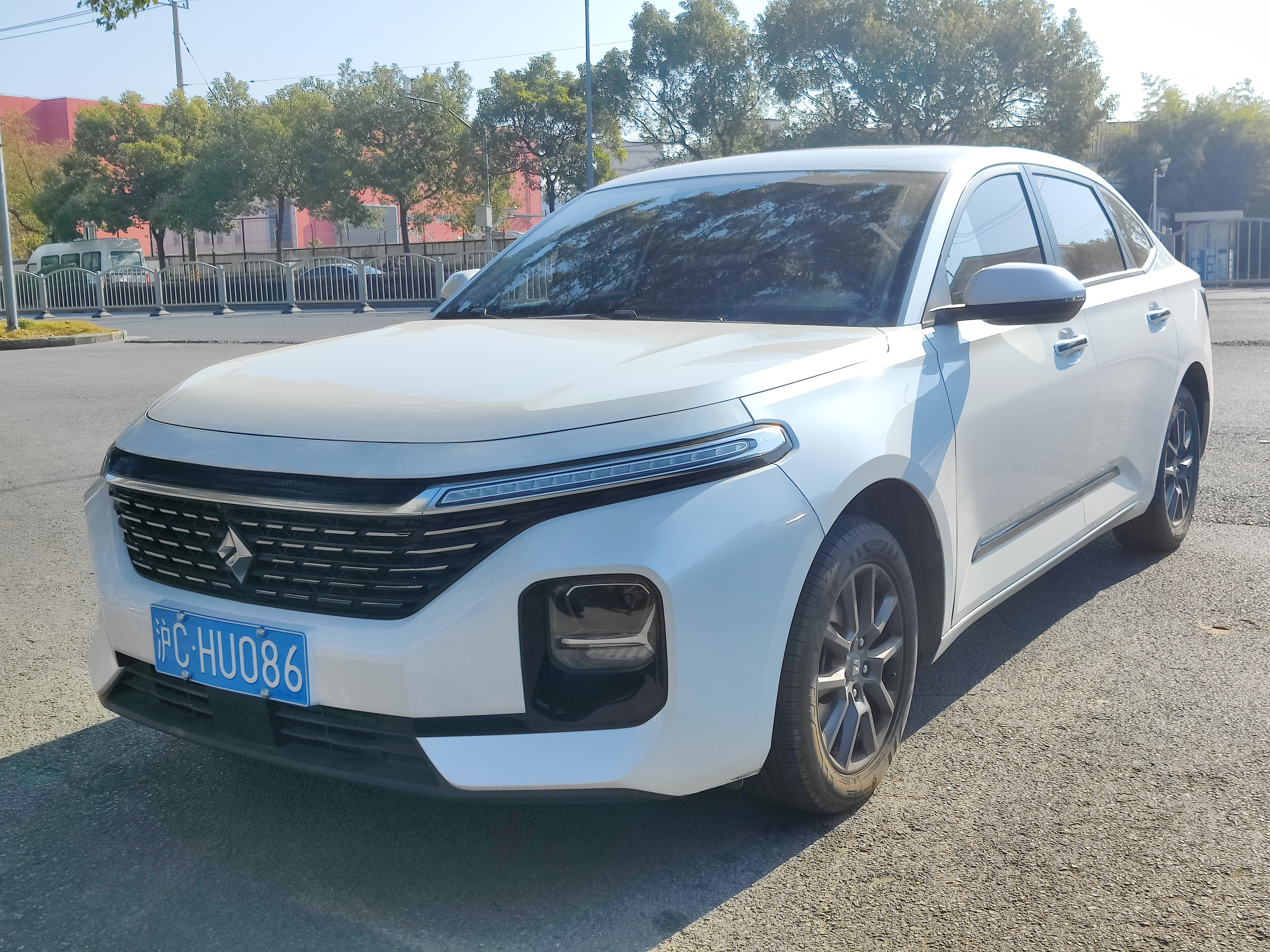
Baojun RC-5

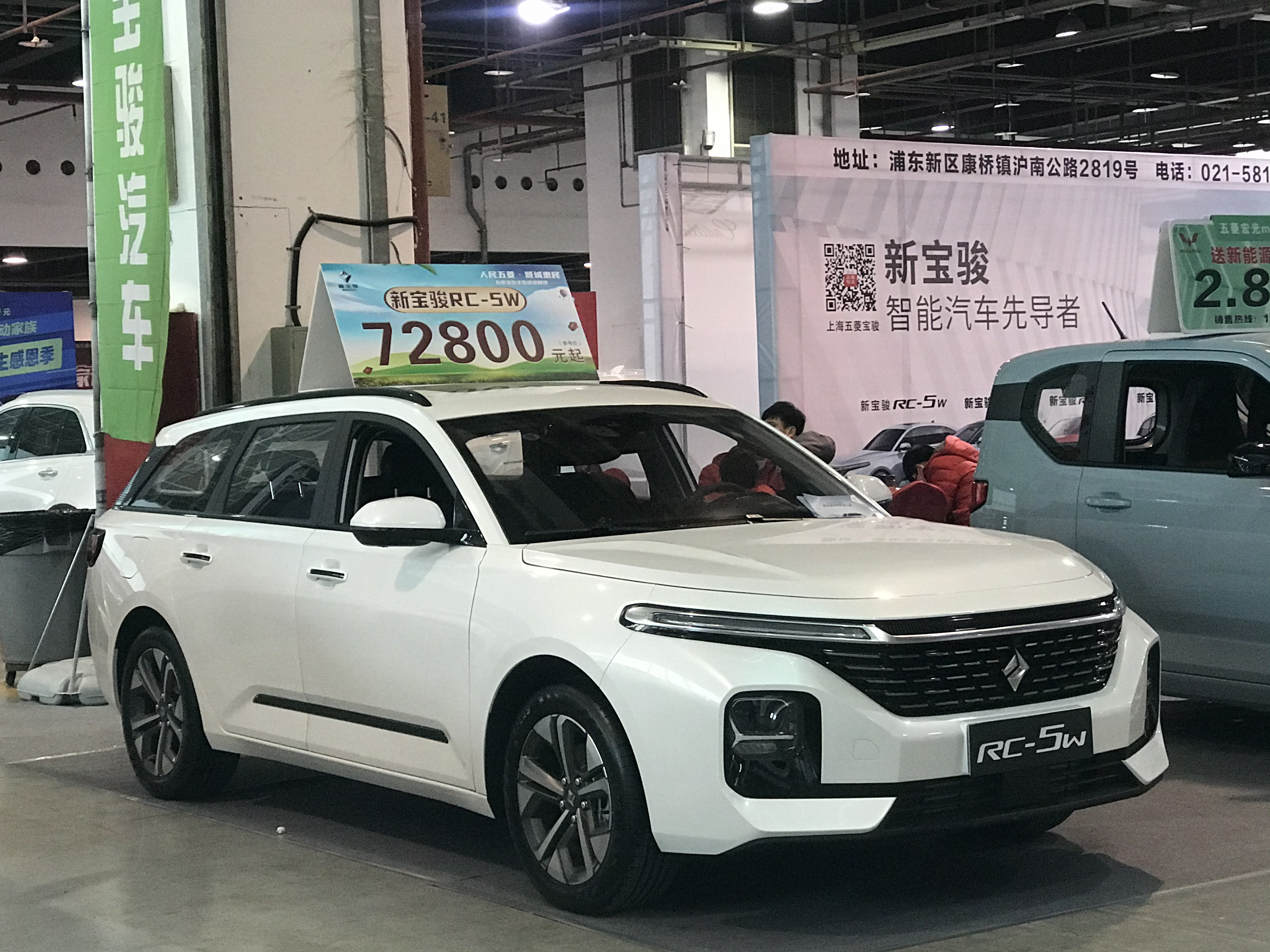
Baojun RC-5W

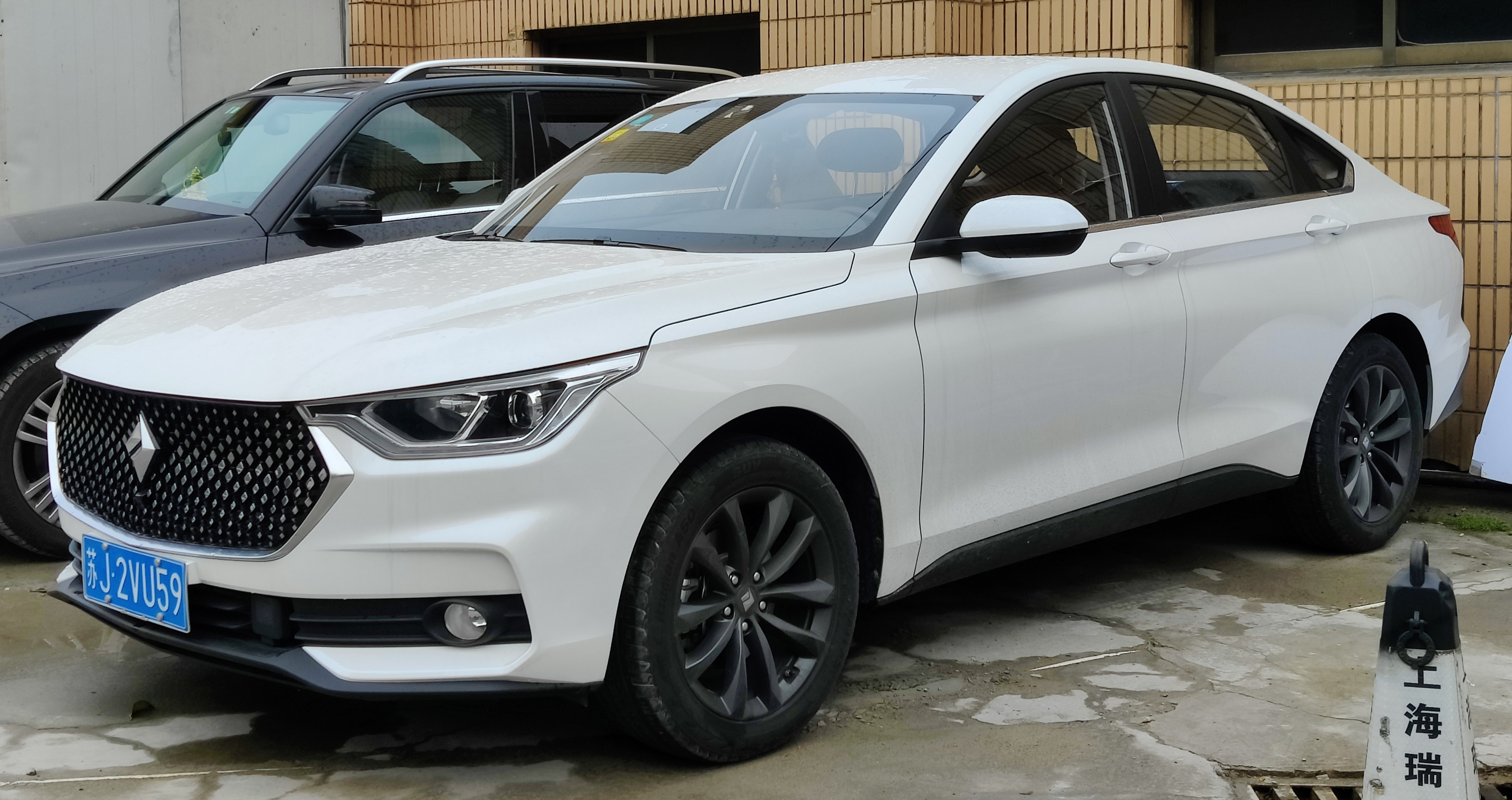
Baojun RC-6

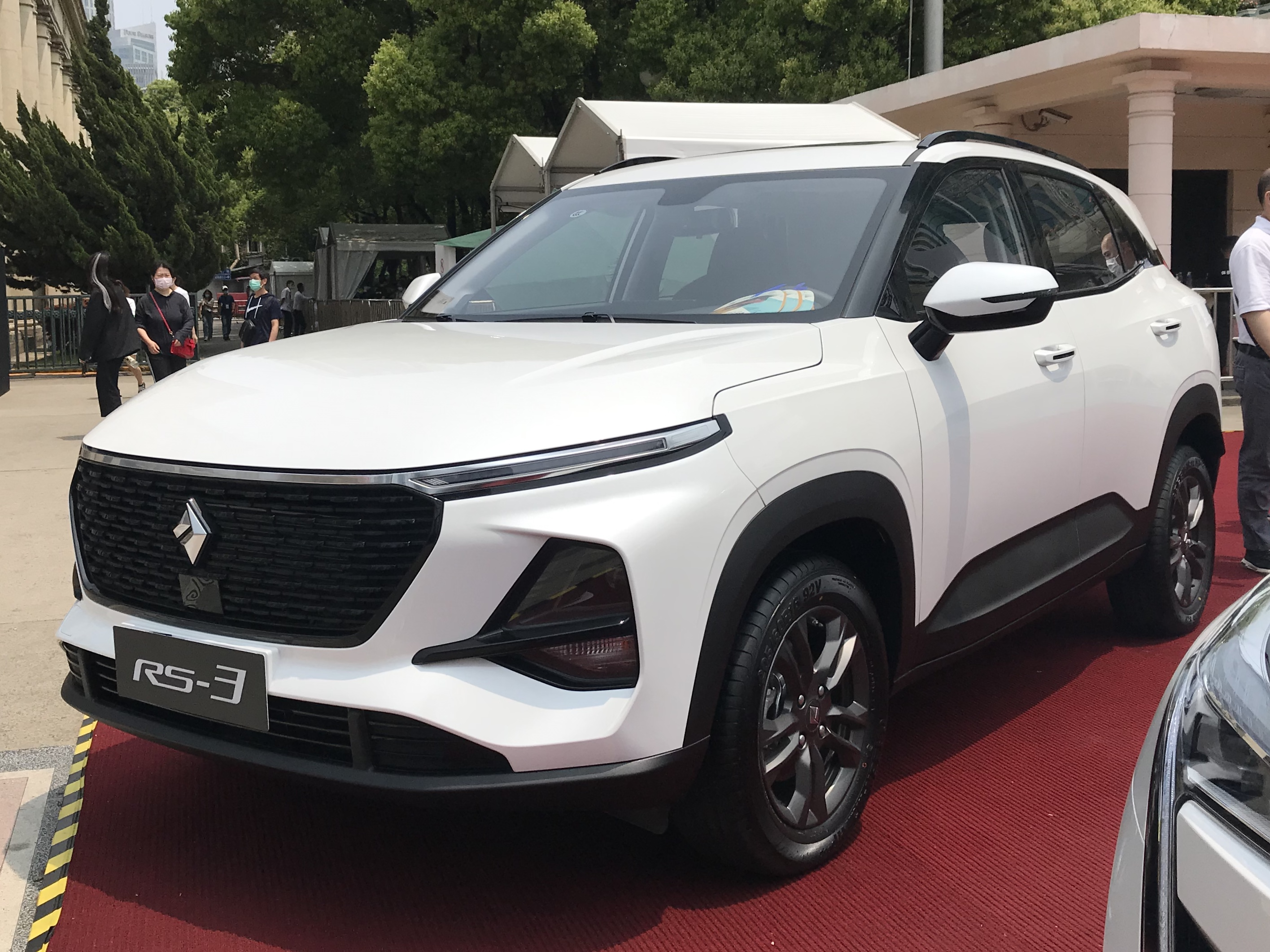
Baojun RS-3

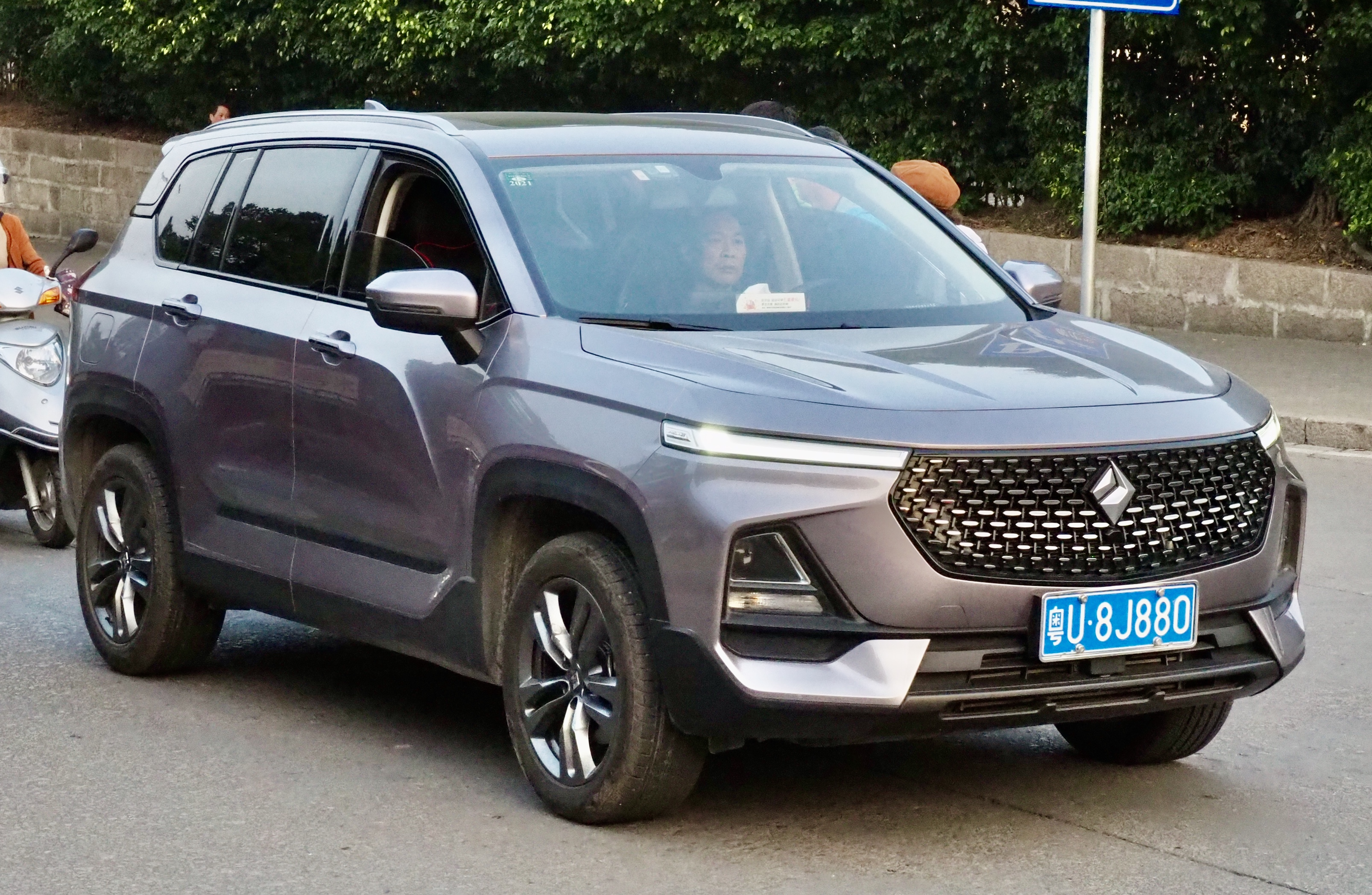
Baojun RS-5

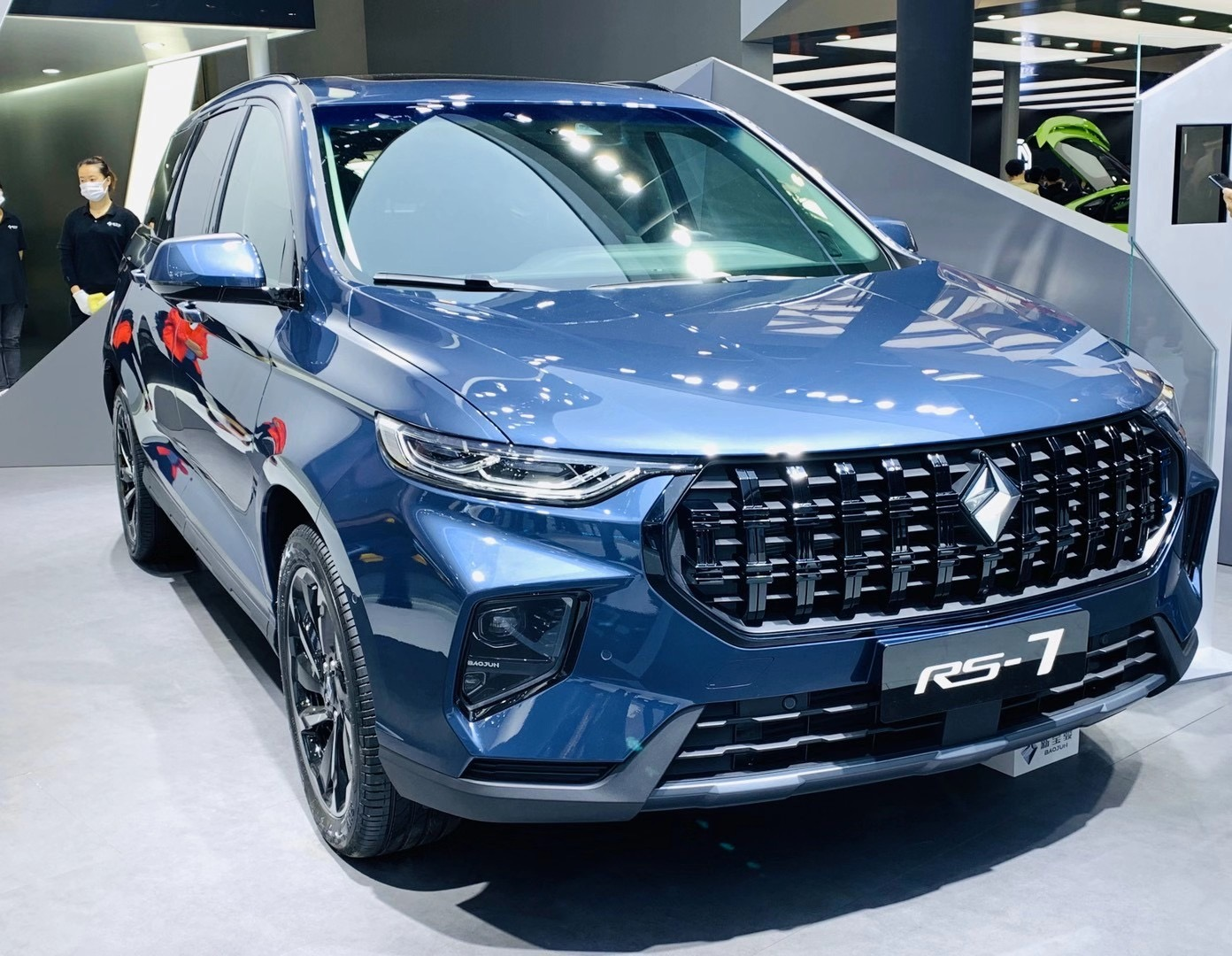
Baojun RS-7

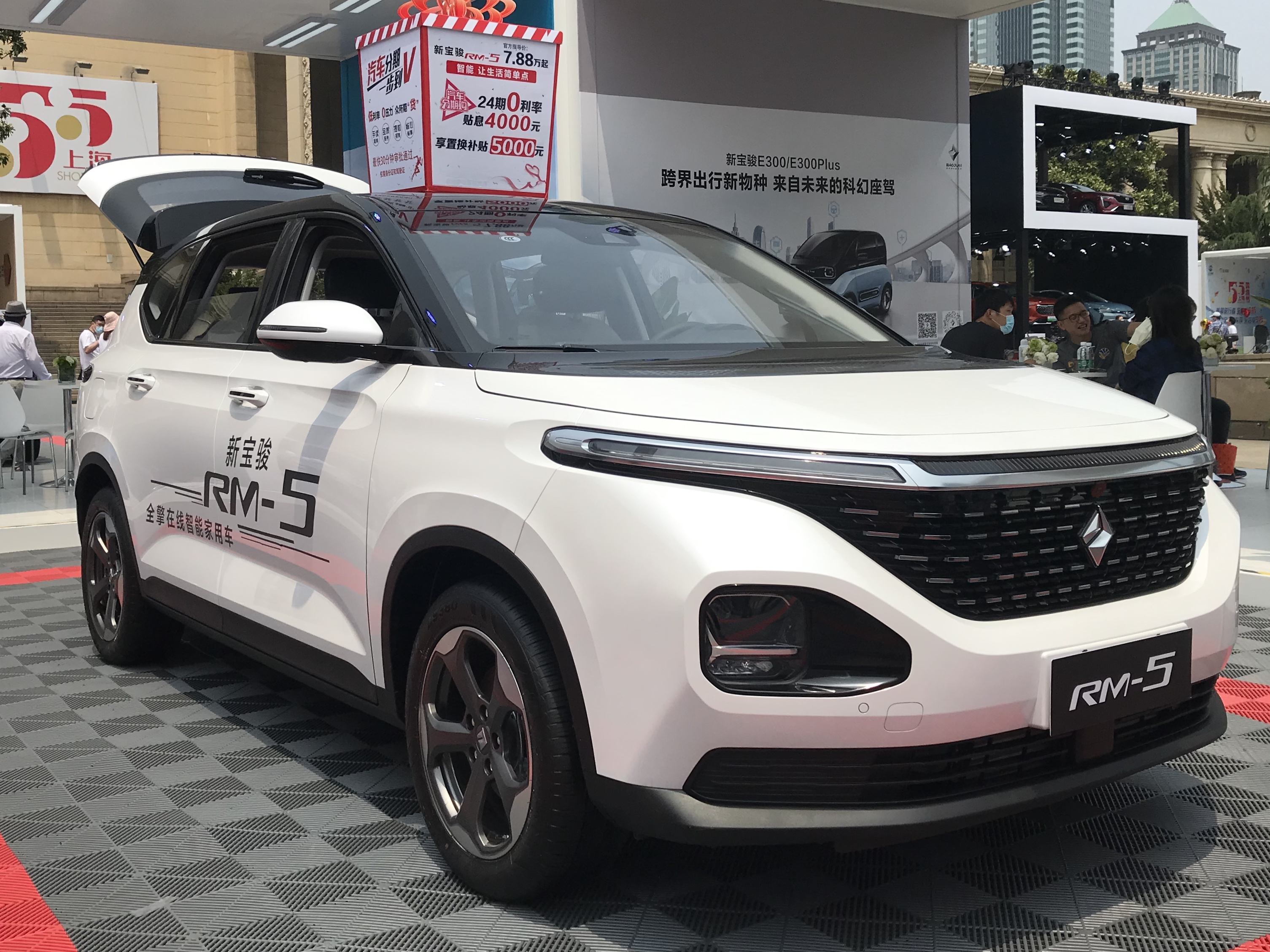
Baojun RM-5

== Controversy ==
On 31 December 2024, more than 100 Baojun Yep owners suddenly encountered brake system failures, making it difficult for the vehicle to slow down. Some owners were dissatisfied with the manufacturer's solution and accused Baojun of evading the problem. Baojun Automobile officially responded that some vehicles had a software bug that caused the brake assist to be downgraded and the brake pedal to become stiff, and it would be properly handled.

== See also ==
- Automobile manufacturers and brands of China
- List of automobile manufacturers of China
- Electric vehicle industry in China
