= Baojun RS-7 =

Chinese crossover SUV

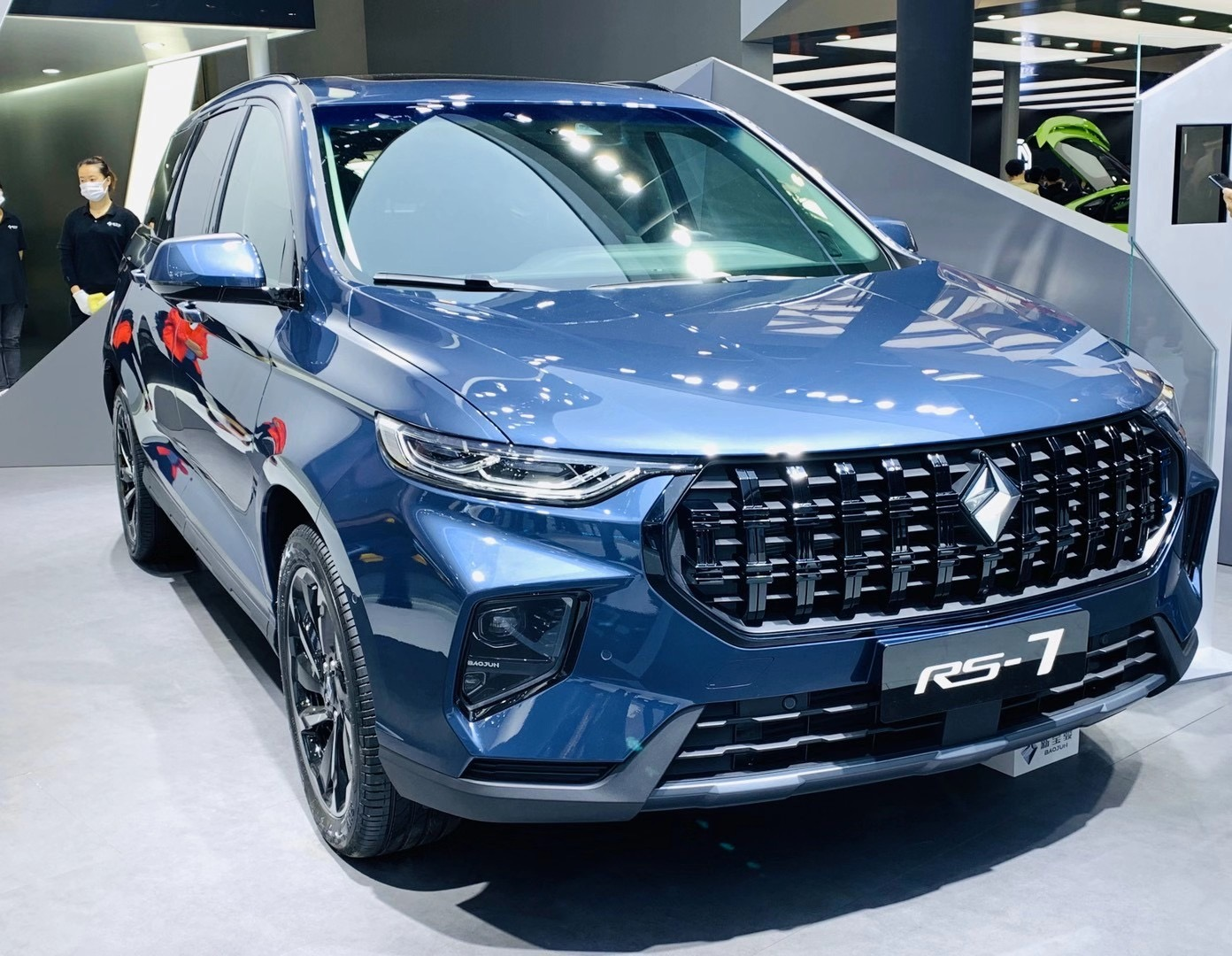

Overview
- Manufacturer: SAIC-GM-Wuling
- Production: 2020–2022
- Assembly: China: Chongqing

Body and chassis
- Class: Mid-size crossover SUV
- Body style: 5-door SUV
- Layout: Front engine, front-wheel drive
- Related: Baojun RC-6

Powertrain
- Engine: 1.5 L turbocharged
- Power output: 175 hp (130 kW; 177 PS)
- Transmission: Automatic

Dimensions
- Wheelbase: 2,900 mm (114.2 in)
- Length: 4,930 mm (194.1 in)
- Width: 1,975 mm (77.8 in)
- Height: 1,765 mm (69.5 in)

The Baojun RS-7 is a mid-size crossover SUV produced by Baojun, a marque of SAIC-GM-Wuling. It was unveiled at 2020 Chongqing Auto Show.

== Overview ==
Among Baojun models the RS-7 is considered a flagship, seeing as it is the largest and most expensive vehicle the brand sold. Like all Baojun models, its sale is limited to the Chinese market.

The 6-seater models features a 2+2+2 layout while the 7-seater variants offer a 2+2+3 layout featuring two executive seats in the second row. The Baojun RS-7 has a high ground clearance of 198 mm (7.8 in) when measured empty and 172 mm (6.8 in) when fully seated and an approach angle of 18 degrees with a departure angle of 21 degrees proving it's all-terrain capability. Power of the Baojun RS-7 comes from a 1.5-liter turbocharged inline-four petrol engine producing 175 hp (130 kW; 177 PS), connected to an automatic transmission and front-wheel drive.

== Sales ==
Year	China
2023	2
2024	0
2025	2
