= Baojun 310 =

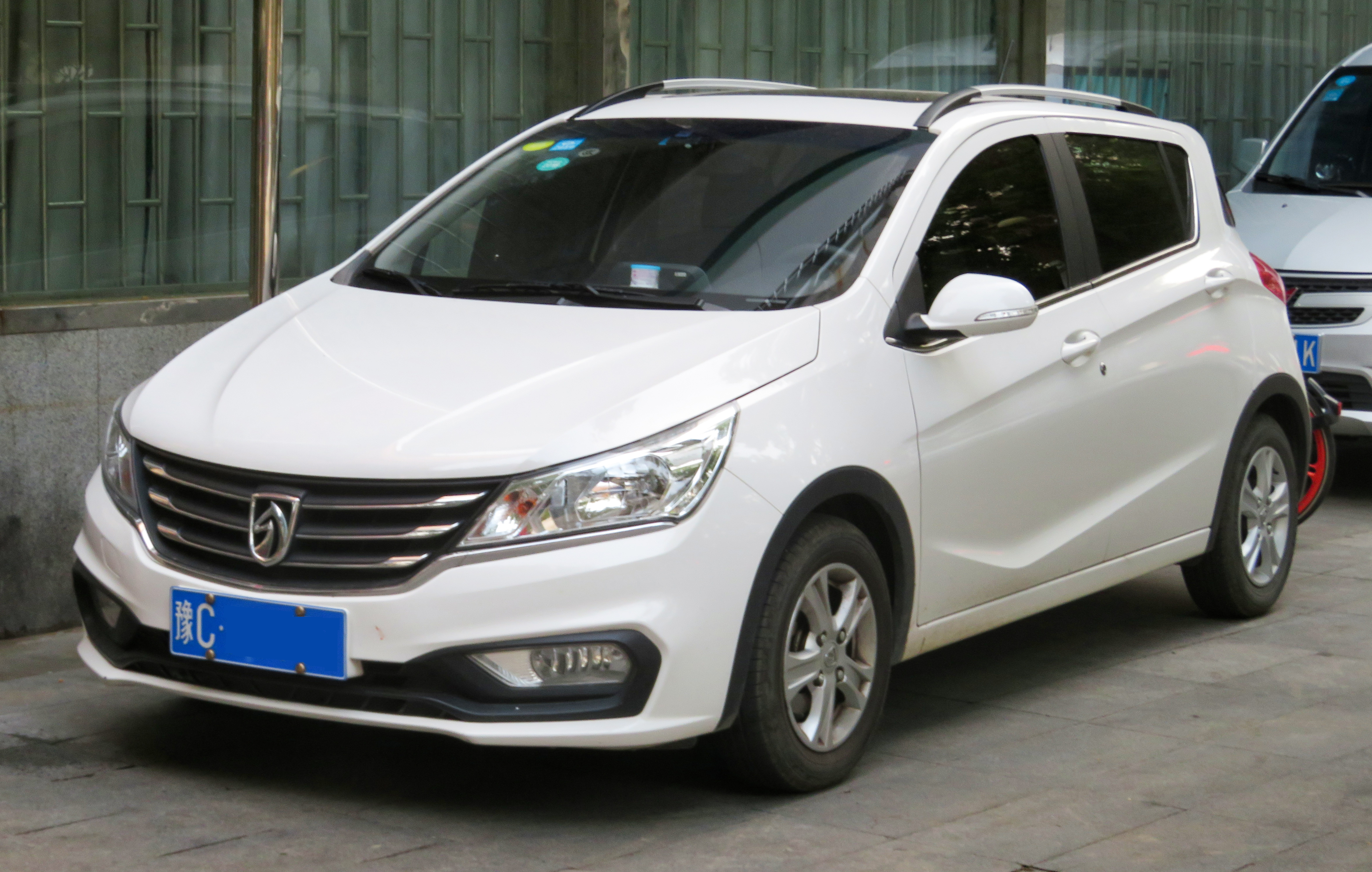

Overview
- Manufacturer: SAIC-GM-Wuling
- Also called: Baojun 310W (wagon); Baojun 330 (sedan)
- Production: 2016–2021
- Model years: 2016–2021

Body and chassis
- Class: Subcompact car (B)
- Body style: 5-door hatchback (310); 5-door estate car (310W)
- Layout: Front-engine, front-wheel-drive
- Related: Chevrolet Sail

Powertrain
- Engine: 1.2 L S-TEC II I4; 1.5 L S-TEC II I4
- Transmission: 6-speed manual 5-speed manual 5-speed semi automatic

Dimensions
- Wheelbase: 2,550 mm (100.4 in) (310); 2,750 mm (108.3 in)(310W); 2,520 mm (99.2 in) (330)
- Length: 4,032 mm (158.7 in) (310); 4,620 mm (181.9 in) (310W); 4,300 mm (169.3 in) (330)
- Width: 1,680 millimetres (66.1 in) (310); 1,710 millimetres (67.3 in) (310W); 1,748 millimetres (68.8 in) (330)
- Height: 1,450 millimetres (57.1 in)–1,470 millimetres (57.9 in) (310); 1,535 millimetres (60.4 in) (310W); 1,500 millimetres (59.1 in) (330)
- Curb weight: 935–1,055 kilograms (2,061–2,326 lb)

The Baojun 310 is a subcompact car produced by SAIC-GM-Wuling through the Baojun brand. It is currently one of China's lowest priced cars with an official list price of around 37800 RMB (~US$5,900) for 1.2L 5MT and 51800 RMB for 1.5L 5AT (~US$8,100).

== Overview ==
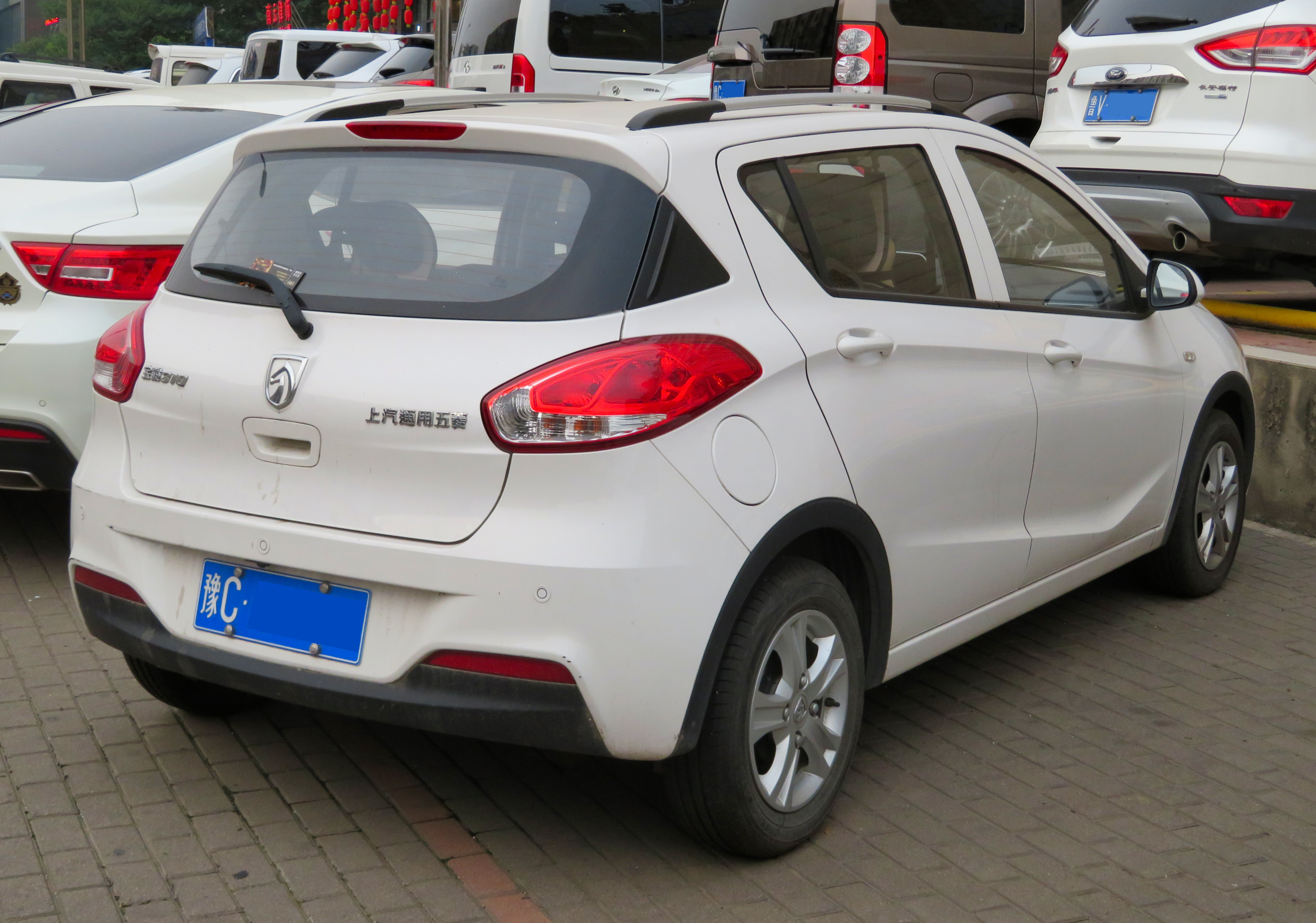
Baojun 310 rear.

The Baojun 310 was launched at the 2016 Beijing Auto Show and commenced production in September 2016. The 310 is based on the same platform as the Chevrolet Sail, which is manufactured in China by the Shanghai-GM joint venture. Price ranges from 36.800 yuan to 60.800 yuan.

The Baojun 310 interior features a high-resolution 8-inch LCD with GPS navigation system and Bluetooth, cruise control, four airbags, ISOFIX child safety seat mountings, power sunroof and 18 extra storage spaces. The 310 also has heated side mirrors, rearview camera, and ABS.

The Baojun 310 is powered by a 1.2 liter naturally aspirated engine that generates a maximum power of 82 PS (81 HP) or 60.3 kW and maximum torque of 116 Nm (86 lb-ft) at 3,600 rpm, along with fuel economy of 5.3L/100 km (44.38 mpg US). A 1.5-liter unit rated at 111 hp / 83 kW was added as an additional engine option shortly after.

=== Baojun 330 ===
A sedan version named the Baojun 330 was also revealed in early 2016, which featured a slightly different front DRG design.

=== Baojun 310W ===
At the 2017 Shanghai Auto Show, a station wagon version called the Baojun 310W was unveiled, sharing most of the parts from the Baojun 310 before the B pillars yet being longer, wider, and taller. After a short run of one year, the Baojun 310W received a facelift updating the front fascia to accommodate the new hexagon Baojun grille.

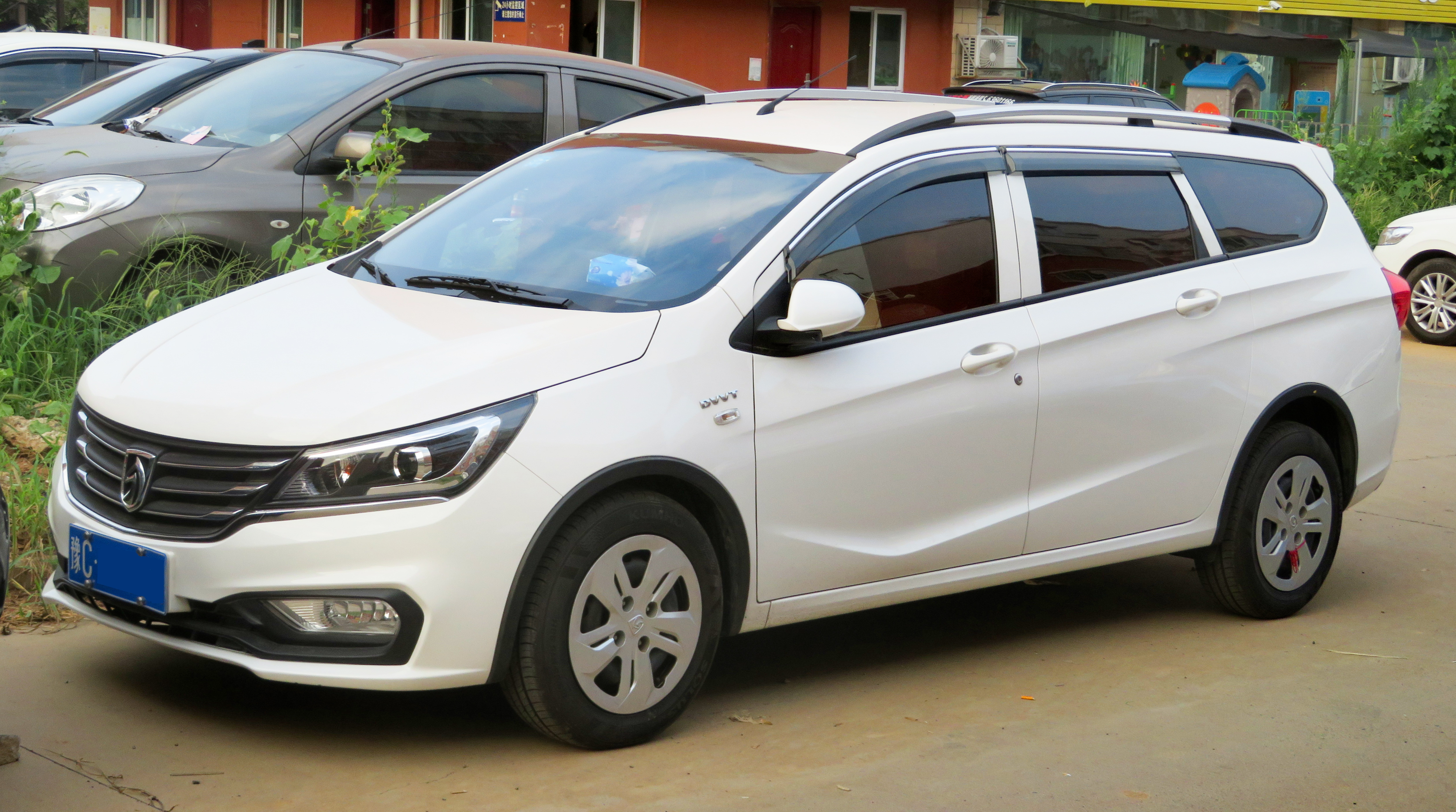
Baojun 310W

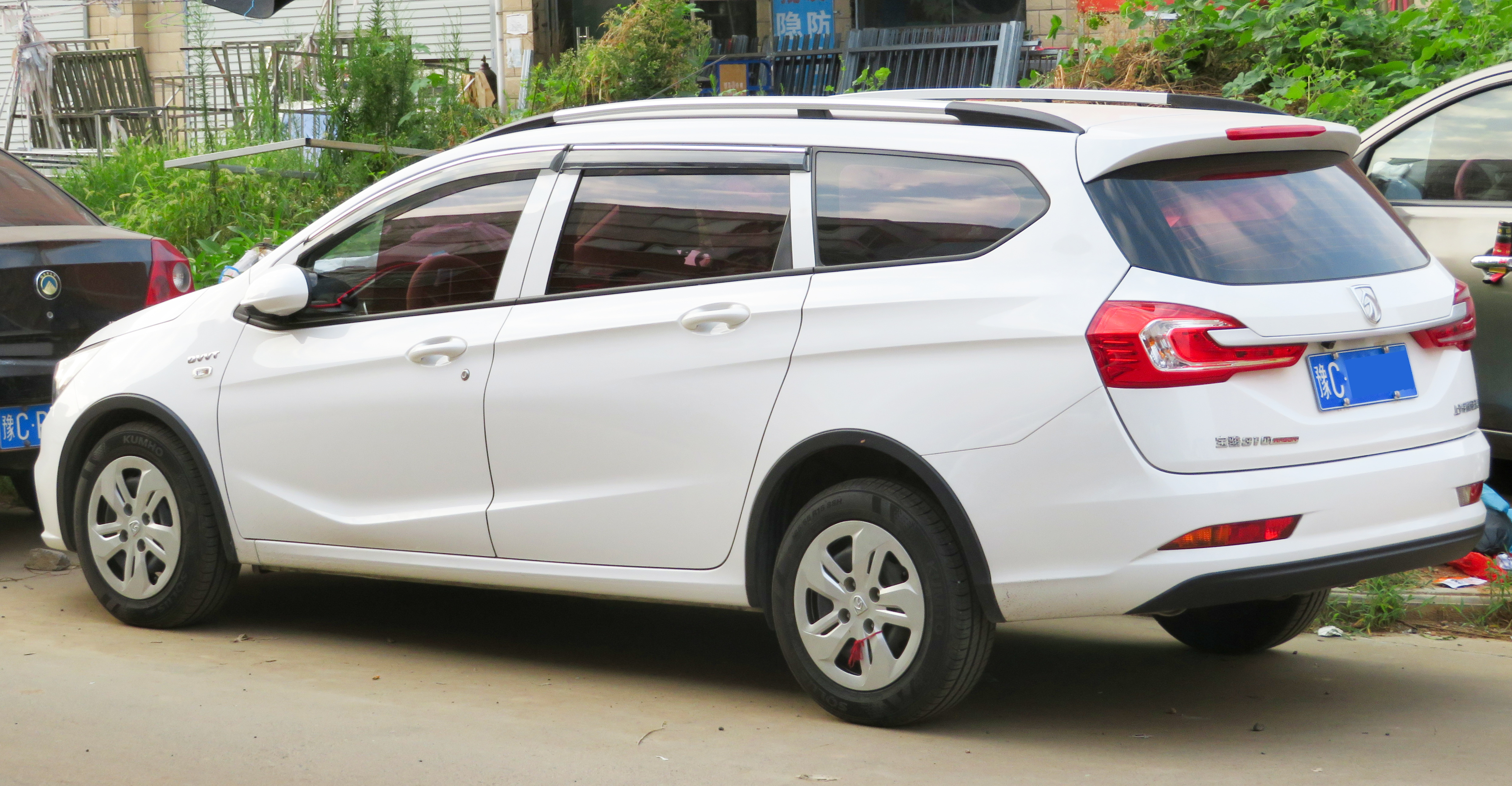
Rear view

=== 2019 facelift ===
The Baojun 310 hatchback and 310W estate received a facelift for the 2019 model year. The facelift model sports an updated front fascia with narrow-slit headlights and large black bumper accents. Different rear bumper and lights are also featured for the rear. The post-facelift model utilizes the same 1.2 liter and 1.5 liter engine unit as the pre-facelift model but now connects to a five-speed semi-automatic transmission, rather than the manual transmission offered previously. The 1.2 liter semi-automatic version of the Baojun 310 was launched first and priced at U.S. $7,400.

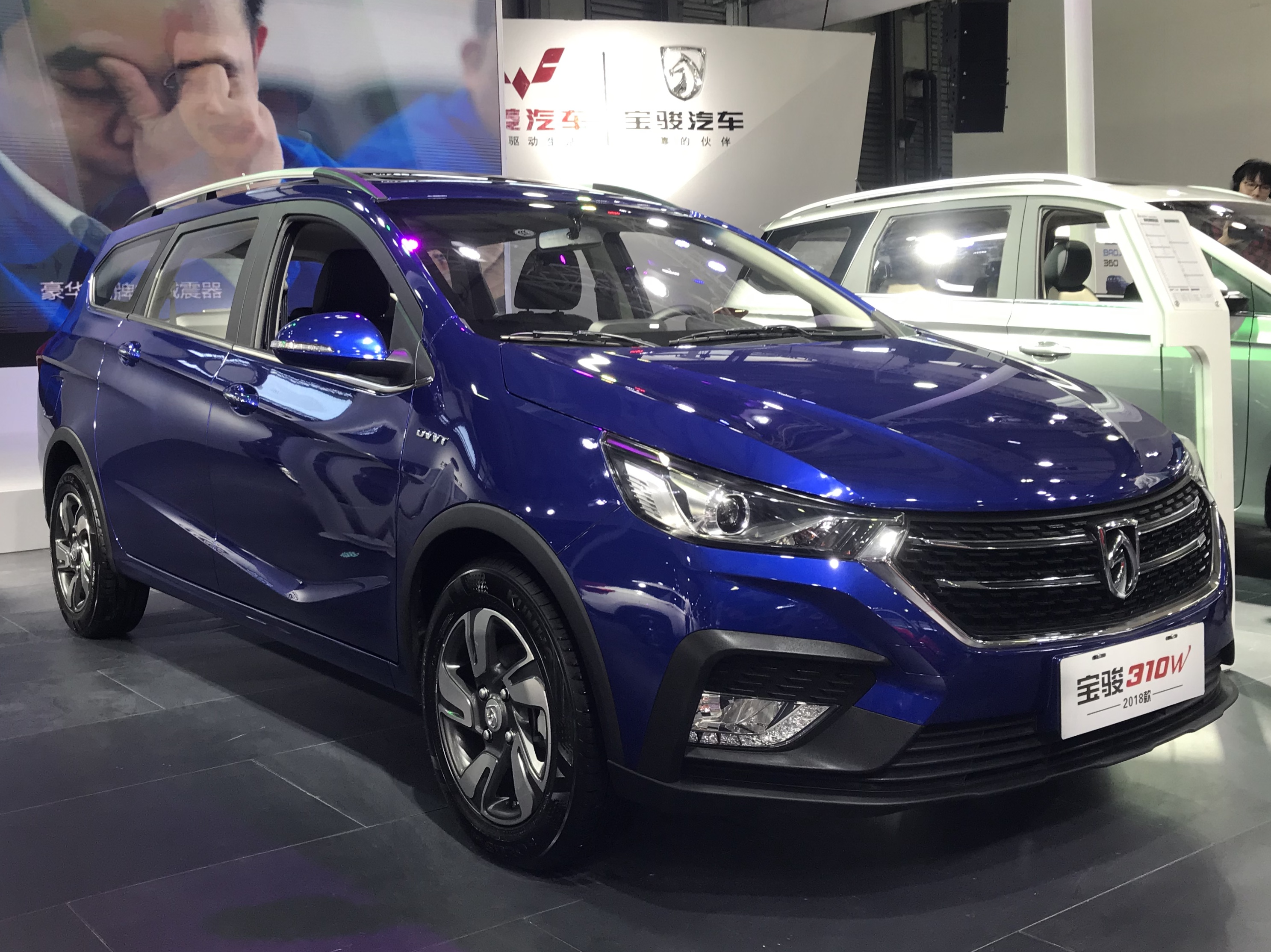
Baojun 310W 2019 facelift front.

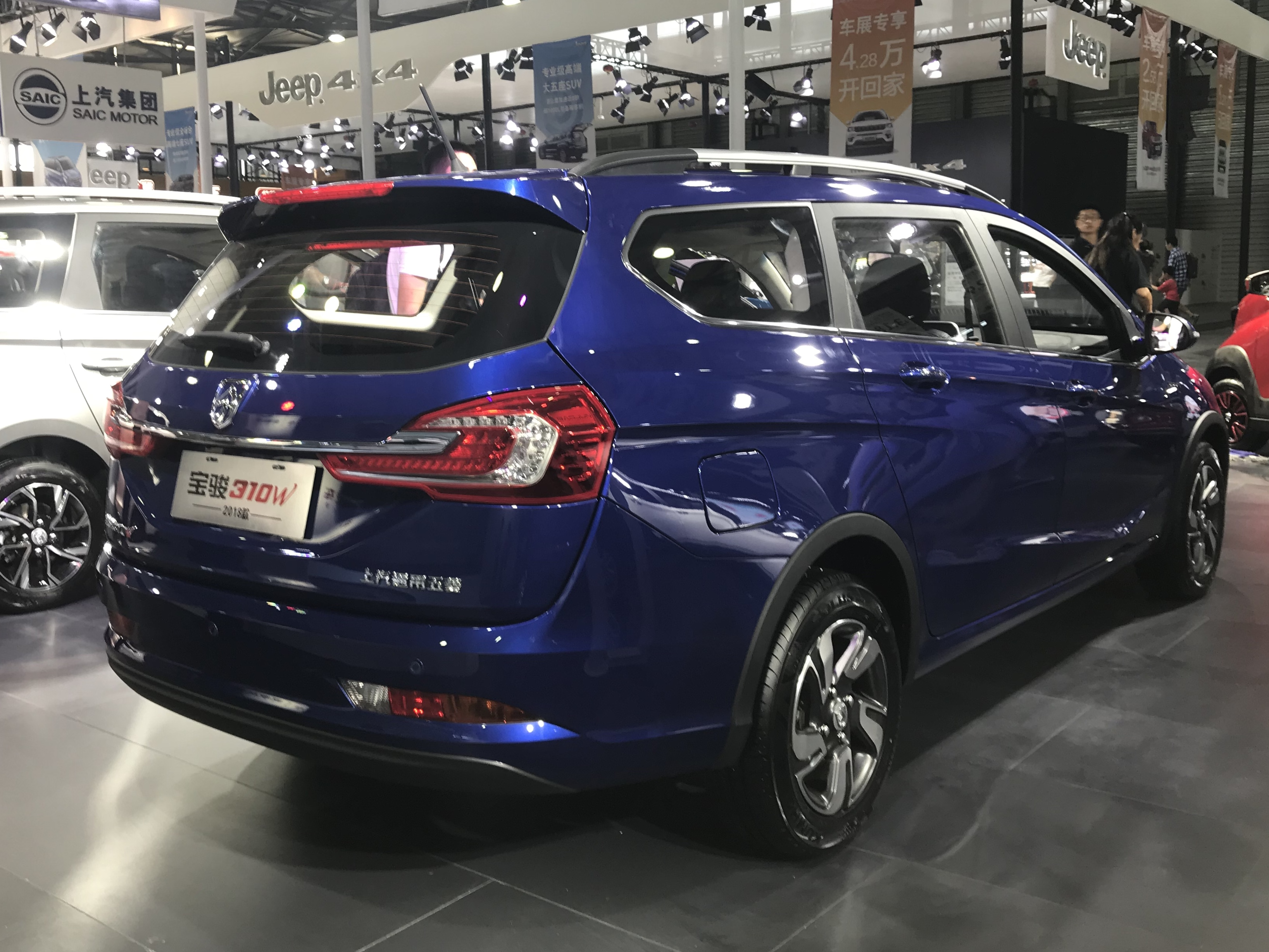
2019 facelift rear view
