= Baojun RC-6 =

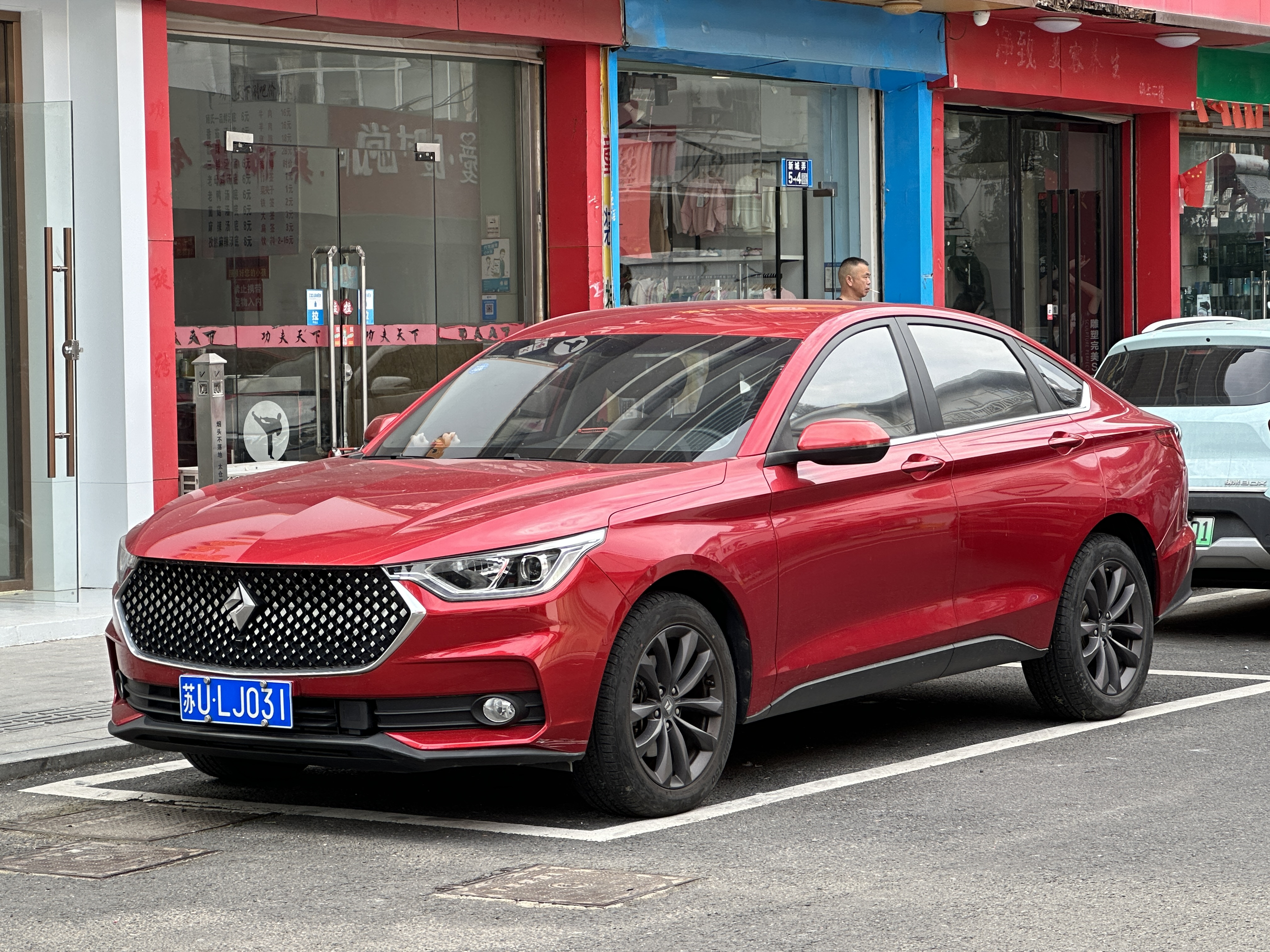

Overview
- Manufacturer: SAIC-GM-Wuling
- Production: 2019–2021
- Assembly: China: Liuzhou, Guangxi

Body and chassis
- Class: Mid-size sedan
- Body style: 5-door liftback
- Layout: Front-engine, front-wheel-drive

Powertrain
- Engine: Petrol: 1.5 L LJO turbo I4
- Power output: 108 kW (145 hp; 147 PS)
- Transmission: 6-speed manual; CVT

Dimensions
- Wheelbase: 2,800 mm (110.2 in)
- Length: 4,925 mm (193.9 in)
- Width: 1,880 mm (74.0 in)
- Height: 1,580 mm (62.2 in)
- Curb weight: 1,440–1,510 kg (3,175–3,329 lb)

The Baojun RC-6 is a crossover sedan produced by SAIC-GM-Wuling through the Baojun brand. It combines the body shape of a liftback with the high ground clearance of 198 mm (7.8 in) and a driving position typical of SUVs.

== Overview ==
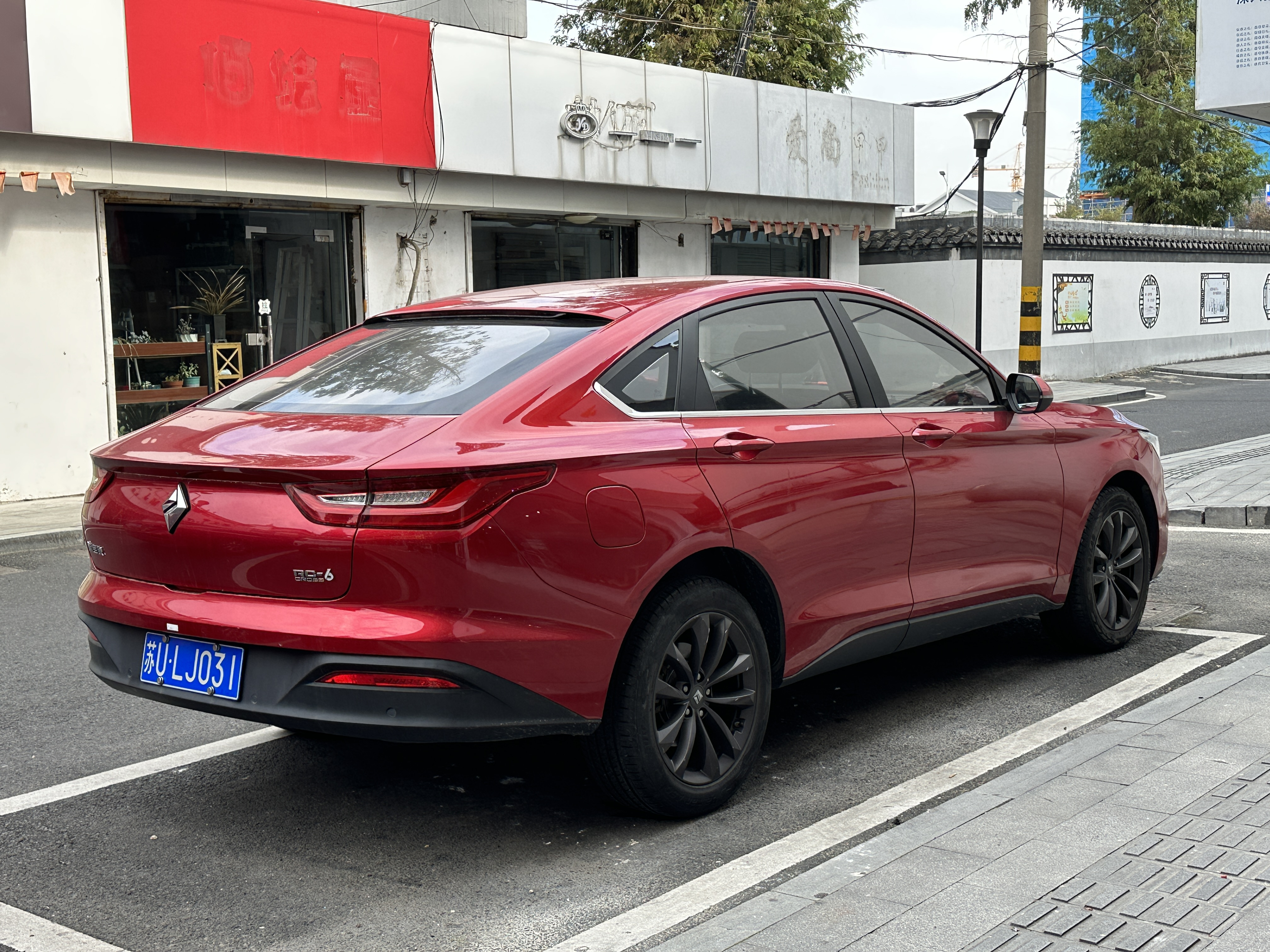
Rear view

The RC-6 is a part of the "New Baojun" sub-category together with the RS-5 and RM-5. It made its debut at the 2019 Chengdu Motor Show.

The RC-6 come with driver assistance system developed by Bosch. To reduce driving fatigue including scenarios that involve heavy traffic, the Bosch Level-2 ADAS system covers 16 daily driving scenarios. Safety features of the RC-6 include Traffic Jam Assist, lane keeping assist, lane departure warning, intelligent cruise assist, Blind-Spot Collision-Avoidance Assist, traffic signal Warning and traffic speed assist. The advanced adaptive cruise control system on the RC-6 can be activated at a speed below 130 km/h (81 mph). The combination of a 77-GHz long-range millimeter-wave radar and a multifunction high-definition camera is capable of identification of people, cars and roads. The LED headlights on the RC-6 is equipped with IHMA intelligent high and low beam switching for safety of other road users.

=== Powertrain ===
The RC-6 is powered by the same unit that powers the RM-5, a 1.5-litre turbocharged engine producing 108 kW (145 hp; 147 PS) of maximum power and 245 N⋅m (181 lb⋅ft) of maximum torque. The engine is paired with a choice of a six-speed manual transmission or a virtual eight-speed continuously variable transmission (CVT).

== Sales ==
Year	China
2023	69
2024	40
