= List of SAIC vehicles =

This is a list of current and former automobiles produced by Chinese automaker SAIC Motor Corp., Ltd. (abbreviated as SAIC), under its brands of IM, Maxus, MG, Rising, Roewe, Wuling, Huajing and Baojun.

In light of SAIC's frequent practice of rebadging among its various brands, this list will prioritize showcasing the original models instead of their rebadged ones.

For SAIC, the brand in cooperation with Huawei under the Harmony Intelligent Mobility Alliance (HIMA), see List of HIMA vehicles.

== Current vehicles ==
=== IM Motors ===
Image	Models	Chinese name	Introduction	Generation	Vehicle description
Sedans
	L6	智己L6	2024	1st	Mid-size sedan, also rebadged as MG IM5
	L7	智己L7	2022	1st	Full-size sedan
SUV
	LS6	智己LS6	2023	1st	Mid-size SUV, also rebadged as MG IM6
	LS7	智己LS7	2023	1st	Mid-size SUV
	LS8	智己LS8	2026	1st	Full-size SUV, also rebadged as MG IM8
	LS9	智己LS9	2025	1st	Full-size SUV

=== MG ===
Image	Models	Introduction	Generation	Vehicle description
Cars
	MG3	2008	3rd	Subcompact hatchback, export only
	MG4 EV	2022	2nd	Compact hatchback, BEV
	MG5	2012	2nd	Compact sedan
	MG6	2009	2nd	Mid-size sedan
	MG7	2007	2nd	Mid-size sedan
	MG 07	2026	1st	Mid-size sedan, BEV/PHEV
Sports car
	Cyberster	2023	1st	Roadster, BEV
SUV
	4X	2026	1st	Compact SUV, BEV
	ZS ZS EV	2017 2018	2nd 1st	Subcompact SUV, export only BEV variant of the MG ZS, export only
	HS	2018	2nd	Compact SUV, the second generation is rebadged by third generation Roewe RX5, export only
	MGS5 EV	2024	1st	Compact SUV, BEV
	MGS6 EV	2025	1st	Mid-size SUV, BEV, export only
	One	2021	1st	Compact SUV, export only

=== Roewe and Rising Auto ===
Image	Models	Chinese name	Introduction	Generation	Vehicle description
Cars
	i5	荣威i5	2017	1st	Compact sedan, also rebadged as MG5
	i6	荣威i6	2017	2nd	Mid-size sedan
	D6	荣威D6	2025	1st	Mid-size sedan, BEV
	D7 M7	荣威D7 荣威M7	2023 2025	1st	Mid-size sedan, BEV/PHEV upgraded variant of D7
	Rising F7	飞凡F7	2023	1st	Mid-size sedan
SUV
	Jiayue 06	荣威家越06	to commence	1st	Mid-size SUV
	Jiayue 07	荣威家越07	2026	1st	Mid-size SUV, EREV/BEV
	Jiayue X7	荣威家越X7	to commence	1st	Mid-size SUV
	Rising R7	飞凡R7	2022	1st	Mid-size SUV
MPV
	iMAX8	荣威iMAX8	2020	1st	Full-size MPV, ICE/BEV/PHEV

=== Maxus ===
Image	Models	Chinese name	Introduction	Generation	Vehicle description
SUV
	Territory	大通领地	2022	1st	Mid-size SUV, luxury variant of D90, also rebadged as MG Majestor
MPV/Minivan
	G10	大通G10	2014	1st	Minivan
	G50	大通G50	2019	1st	Minivan, also rebadged as MG G50/G50 Plus
	G70 Mifa 7	大通G70 大通大家7	2023	1st	Minivan BEV/PHEV variant of the Maxus G70, also rebadged as MG Maxus 7
	G90 Mifa 9	大通G90 大通大家9	2022 2021	1st	Minivan BEV variant of the Maxus G90, also rebadged as MG Maxus 9, MG M9 EV and MG Mifa 9
Van
	Dana V1 Dana M1	大通大拿V1 大通大拿M1	2024	1st	Van
	V80/EV80	大通新途V80/EV80	2011	1st	Van
	V90/EV90	大通新途V90/EV90	2019	1st	Van
Pick-up truck
	T60 Interstellar L T90	大通星际L 大通星际H	2016 2019 2021	1st	Pick-up trucks Pick-up trucks, also rebadged as MG Extender, MG T60 and Chevrolet S10 Max Pick-up trucks
	Terron 9/Interstellar X eTerron 9/Interstellar X EV	大通星际X 大通星际X EV	2024	1st	Pick-up trucks, also rebadged as MGU9 BEV variant of the Terron 9/Interstellar X

=== Wuling ===
==== Silver badge ====
Image	Models	Chinese name	Introduction	Generation	Vehicle description
Car
	Air EV	五菱Air EV晴空	2022	1st	Micro car, BEV, also rebadged as MG Comet EV and Chevrolet Spark EV
	Hongguang Mini EV	五菱宏光MINIEV	2020	2nd	Micro car, BEV
	Binguo	五菱缤果	2023	1st	Subcompact hatchback, BEV, also rebadged as MG Binguo EV
	Binguo Pro	五菱缤果Pro	2026	1st	Subcompact hatchback, BEV
	Starlight	五菱星光	2023	1st	Mid-size sedan, PHEV/BEV
SUV
	Alvez	五菱星驰	2022	1st	Subcompact SUV, also rebadged as Chevrolet Groove
	Binguo Plus	五菱缤果PLUS	2024	1st	Subcompact SUV, BEV
	Binguo S	五菱缤果S	2025	1st	Subcompact SUV, BEV
	Asta	五菱星辰	2021	1st	Compact SUV, ICE/HEV
	Nebula	五菱星云	2023	1st	Compact SUV, HEV
	Starlight S	五菱星光S	2024	1st	Compact SUV, BEV/PHEV, also rebadged as Chevrolet Captiva PHEV/EV
	Starlight 560/Eksion	五菱星光560	2025	1st	Compact SUV, ICE/PHEV/BEV
	Starlight L	五菱星光L	2026	1st	Mid-size SUV, PHEV
MPV
	Jiachen	五菱佳辰	2022	1st	Compact MPV
	Victory	五菱凯捷	2020	1st	Mid-size MPV, ICE/HEV
	Starlight 730/Darion	五菱星光730	2025	1st	Mid-size MPV, ICE/PHEV/BEV
	Starlight M	五菱星光M	upcoming	1st	Full-size MPV, PHEV

==== Red badge ====
Image	Models	Chinese name	Introduction	Generation	Vehicle description
SUV
	Hongguang S3	五菱宏光S3	2017	1st	Compact SUV
Van/MPV
	Rongguang	五菱荣光	2008	2nd	Microvan
	Zhiguang	五菱之光	2002	3rd	Microvan, BEV
	Hongguang	五菱宏光	2010	3rd	Compact MPV, BEV/PHEV
	Hongguang V	五菱宏光V	2015	2nd	Compact MPV
	Hongguang Plus	五菱宏光PLUS	2019	1st	Compact MPV
	Yangguang/Mitra EV	五菱扬光	2024	1st	Mid-size van, BEV
	Yangguang L	五菱扬光L	2026	1st	Mid-size van, BEV
	Yangguang Pro	五菱扬光Pro	2026	1st	Mid-size van, BEV/EREV
	Zhengcheng	五菱征程	2014	2nd	Full-size MPV
Truck
	Longka	五菱龙卡	2023	1st	Mid-size truck

=== Huajing ===
Image	Models	Chinese name	Introduction	Generation	Vehicle description
SUV
	Huajing S	华境S	2026	1st	Full-size SUV, PHEV

=== Baojun ===
Image	Models	Chinese name	Introduction	Generation	Vehicle description
Car
	Xiangjing	宝骏享境	2025	1st	Mid-size sedan, BEV/PHEV
SUV
	Yep	宝骏悦也	2023	1st	Mini SUV, BEV
	Yep Plus	宝骏悦也Plus	2024	1st	Enlarged variant of Yep, also rebadged as Chevrolet Spark EUV
	Yunhai/E6	宝骏云海/E6	2024	1st	Compact SUV, BEV/PHEV

== Discontinued vehicles ==
=== Shanghai ===
Image	Model	Chinese name	Introduction	Discontinued	Generation	Vehicle description
Cars
	SH760	上海SH760	1964	1991	1st	Mid-size sedan

=== MG ===
Image	Models	Chinese name	Introduction	Discontinued	Generation	Vehicle description
Car
	GT	名爵锐行	2014	2019	1st	Compact sedan
Sports car
	TF	名爵TF	1995	2011	1st	Sports car
SUV
	GS	名爵锐腾	2015	2019	1st	Compact SUV

=== Roewe and Rising Auto ===
Image	Models	Chinese name	Introduction	Discontinued	Generation	Vehicle description
Cars
	Clever	荣威克莱威	2020	2025	1st	City car
	E50	荣威E50	2013	2016	1st	City car, also rebadged as MG E50 and MG Dynamo EV
	350	荣威350	2010	2014	1st	Compact sedan, also rebadged as MG 350
	360/360 Plus	荣威360/360PLUS	2015	2018	1st	Compact sedan, also rebadged as MG 360
	550/e550	荣威550/e550	2008	2014	1st	Compact sedan, also rebadged as MG 550
	750	荣威750	2006	2016	1st	Mid-size sedan, also rebadged as MG 750
	950/e950	荣威950/e950	2012	2022	1st	Mid-size sedan
	Ei5	荣威Ei5	2017	2025	1st	Compact station wagon, BEV, also rebadged as MG5 EV
	ei6	荣威ei6	2017	2020	1st	Mid-size sedan
	i6 Max/ei6 Max	荣威i6 MAX/ei6 MAX	2020	2025	1st	Mid-size sedan, Developed into Rising ER6
	Rising ER6	飞凡ER6	2020	2022	1st	Compact sedan, Developed from Roewe ei6
SUV
	RX3/RX3 Pro Totoro/Lomemo	荣威RX3/RX3 PRO 荣威龙猫	2017 2022	2023	1st	Subcompact SUV Hybrid variant of the Roewe RX3 Pro
	RX5/RX5 Plus/eRX5 D5X	荣威RX5/RX5 PLUS/eRX5 荣威D5X	2016 2024	2026	3rd	Compact SUV, also rebadged as MG RX5 Compact SUV, the third generation is also rebadged as second generation MG HS
	RX5 Max/RX5 eMax	荣威RX5 MAX/RX5 eMAX	2019	2023	1st	Compact crossover SUV
	Jing	荣威鲸	2022	2023	1st	Compact coupe SUV, also rebadged as MG Whale
	Marvel X	荣威MARVEL X	2018	2021	1st	Mid-size SUV, developed into Rising Marvel R, also rebadged as MG Marvel R
	Rising Marvel R	飞凡MARVEL R	2020	2022	1st	Mid-size SUV, Also rebadged as MG Marvel R
	RX8	荣威RX8	2018	2023	1st	Mid-size SUV, also rebadged as MG RX8
	RX9	荣威RX9	2023	2025	1st	Mid-size SUV, also rebadged as MGS9 PHEV, MG RX9 and MG QS
	W5	荣威W5	2011	2017	1st	Mid-size SUV, rebadged SsangYong Kyron

=== Maxus ===
Image	Models	Chinese name	Introduction	Discontinued	Generation	Vehicle description
SUV
	D60 Euniq 6 Mifa 6	大通D60 大通EUNIQ 6 大通大家6	2019 2023	2024 2023 2024	1st	Mid-size SUV
	D90	大通D90	2017	2023	1st	Mid-size SUV, also rebadged as MG Gloster
MPV/Minivan
	G20 Euniq 7/Mifa	大通G20 大通EUNIQ 7/大家氢	2019 2022	2025 2023	1st	Minivan BEV/hydrogen variant of G20
	Euniq 5 Mifa 5	大通EUNIQ 5 大通大家5	2019 2022	2023 2025	1st	Minivan, BEV variant of the Maxus G50.
	Istana	大通伊思坦纳	2004	2014	1st	Minivan, rebadged SsangYong Istana.
Van
	EV30	大通EV30	2018	2026	1st	Van
	V70/EV70	大通新途V70/EV70	2022	2026	1st	Van
	LD100	大通LD100	2005	2009	1st	Van

=== Wuling ===
==== Silver badge ====
Image	Models	Chinese name	Introduction	Discontinued	Generation	Vehicle description
Car
	Nano EV	五菱Nano EV	2021	2025	1st	Micro car, BEV

==== Red badge ====
Image	Models	Chinese name	Introduction	Discontinued	Generation	Vehicle description
MPV/Van
	E10 EV	五菱E10 EV	2023	2025	1st	Microvan, BEV
	Hongtu	五菱鸿途	2007	2012	1st	Minivan
	Dragon	五菱兴旺	1990	2009	1st	Minivan
	Hongguang S1	五菱宏光S1	2015	2017	1st	Compact van
Pick-up truck
	Zhengtu	五菱征途	2021	2025	1st	Mid-size pickup

=== Baojun ===
Image	Models	Chinese name	Introduction	Discontinued	Generation	Vehicle description
Cars
	E100	宝骏E100	2017	2021	1st	City car, BEV
	E200	宝骏E200	2018	2021	1st	City car, BEV
	E300/KiWi EV	宝骏E300/KIWI EV	2020	2025	1st	City car, BEV
	Lechi	宝骏乐驰	2008	2021	1st	City car
	310 310W 330	宝骏310 宝骏310W 宝骏330	2016 2017 2016	2020 2017	1st	Subcompact car Station wagon variant of 310 Sedan variant of 310
	630 610	宝骏630 宝骏610	2011 2014	2019	1st	Compact sedan Hatchback variant of 630
	Yunduo	宝骏云朵	2023	2025	1st	Compact car, BEV, also rebadged as Wuling Cloud EV & MG Windsor EV
	RC-5 RC-5W/Valli	宝骏RC-5 宝骏RC-5W/Valli	2020	2022	1st	Compact sedan Wagon variant of RC-5
	RC-6	宝骏RC-6	2019	2021	1st	Mid-size fastback sedan
SUVs
	510	宝骏510	2017	2021	1st	Subcompact SUV
	530	宝骏530	2018	2021	1st	Compact SUV, also rebadged as MG Hector and Chevrolet Captiva
	560	宝骏560	2015	2017	1st	Compact SUV
	RS-3	宝骏RS-3	2019	2023	1st	Subcompact SUV
	RS-5	宝骏RS-5	2019	2021	1st	Compact SUV
	RM-5	宝骏RM-5	2019	2021	1st	Mid-size SUV
	RS-7	宝骏RS-7	2020	2022	1st	Mid-size SUV
MPVs
	360	宝骏360	2018	2021	1st	Compact MPV
	730	宝骏730	2014	2021	1st	Compact MPV
