= RS5 =

RS5 may refer to:

- Audi RS5, a 2010–present German compact executive performance car
- Audi RS5 DTM, a 2013–2018 German race car
- Audi RS5 Turbo DTM, a 2019–present German race car
- Baojun RS-5, a 2018–present Chinese compact SUV
