= Wuling Zhengcheng =

Chinese van model

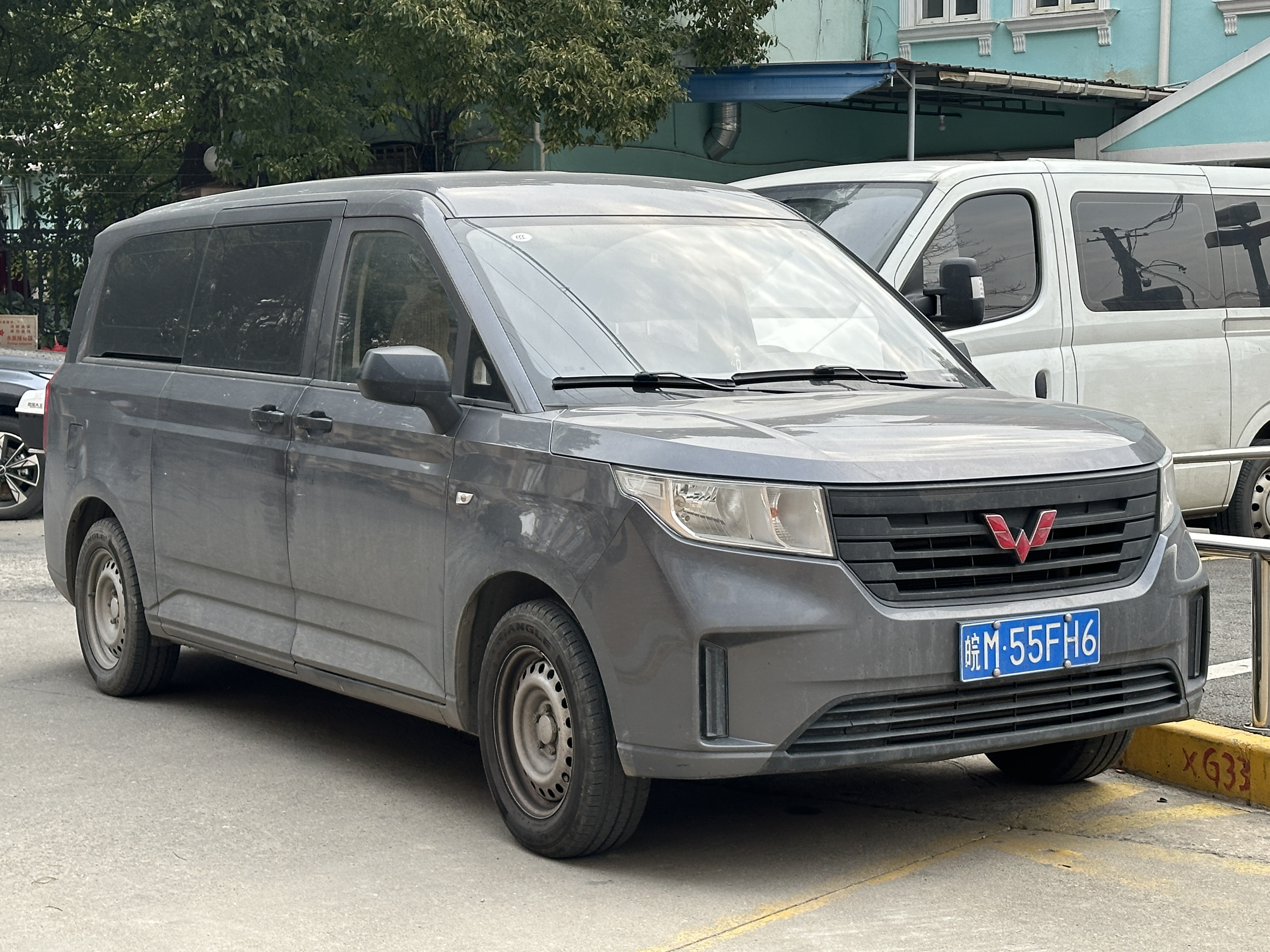

Overview
- Manufacturer: SAIC-GM-Wuling
- Production: 2015–present

Body and chassis
- Class: Minivan
- Body style: 5-door minivan
- Layout: Front-engine, rear-wheel-drive

The Wuling Zhengcheng (Chinese: 五菱征程; pinyin: Wǔlíng zhēngchéng) is a van and MPV produced by SAIC-GM-Wuling under the Wuling Motors brand. It is the largest van produced by Wuling and serves as the flagship MPV of the brand. First launched in 2015 and was produced till 2018 when the model was relaunched as the Wuling Zhengcheng Classic, making way for the upcoming second generation model.

The second generation model is longer, wider and lower compared to the first generation model while featuring a shorter wheelbase. The model is offered as 7-, 8- and 9- seater models. Styling wise, the second generation model is boxier and similar to the Wuling Hongguang Plus in terms of styling.

== First generation (2014) ==
First generation
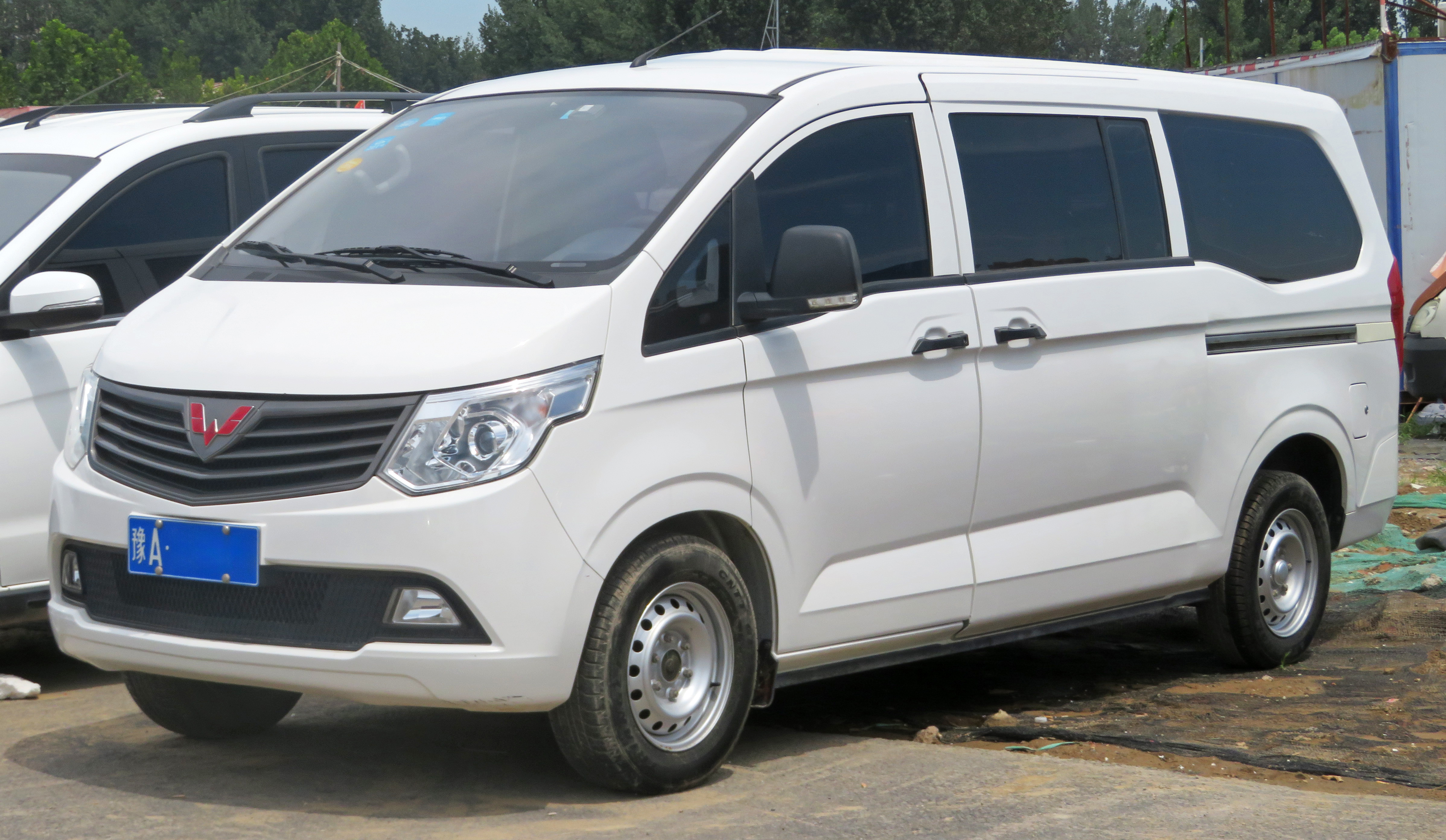

Overview
- Production: 2014–2018
- Model years: 2015–2018
- Assembly: China: Liuzhou, Guangxi

Powertrain
- Engine: Petrol: 1.5 L I4; 1.8 L I4
- Transmission: 5-speed manual

Dimensions
- Wheelbase: 3,250 mm (128.0 in)
- Length: 5,090 mm (200.4 in)
- Width: 1,780 mm (70.1 in)
- Height: 1,925 mm (75.8 in)

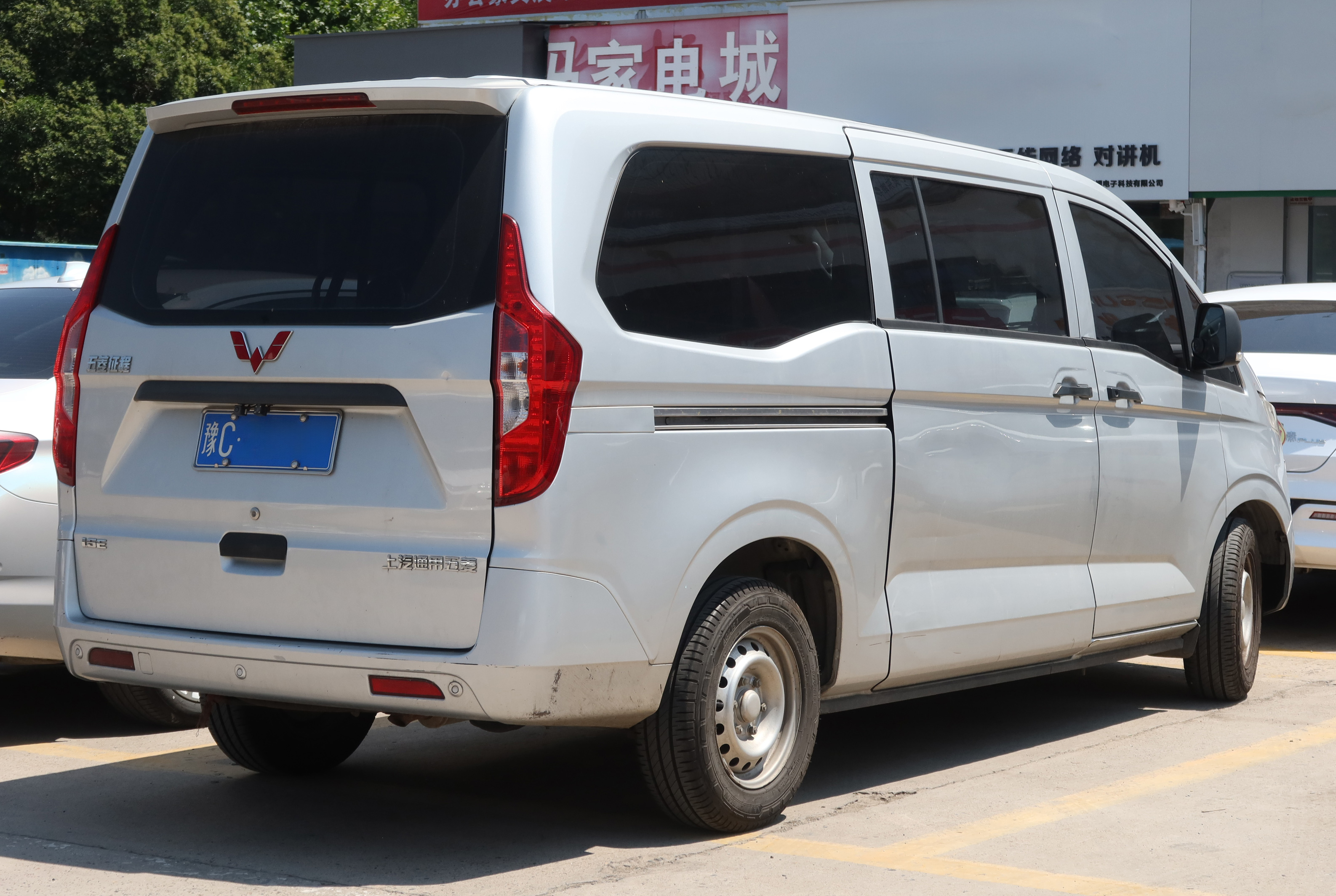
Wuling Zhengcheng rear

The Zhengcheng was launched on the Chinese car market in 2015 as the largest vehicle in the Wuling product line-up. The Zhengcheng, or 'Journey', is a nine-seat MPV or minibus aimed mostly at fleet and taxi companies to be used as shuttles.

=== Powertrain ===
The Wuling Zhengcheng comes with two engine options which includes a 1.5 liter engine and 1.8 liter gasoline engine, the combined fuel consumption of the 1.5 liter engine is 8.4L/100km, and the combined fuel consumption of the 1.8 liter engine is 8.8L/100km.

== Second generation (2021) ==
Second generation
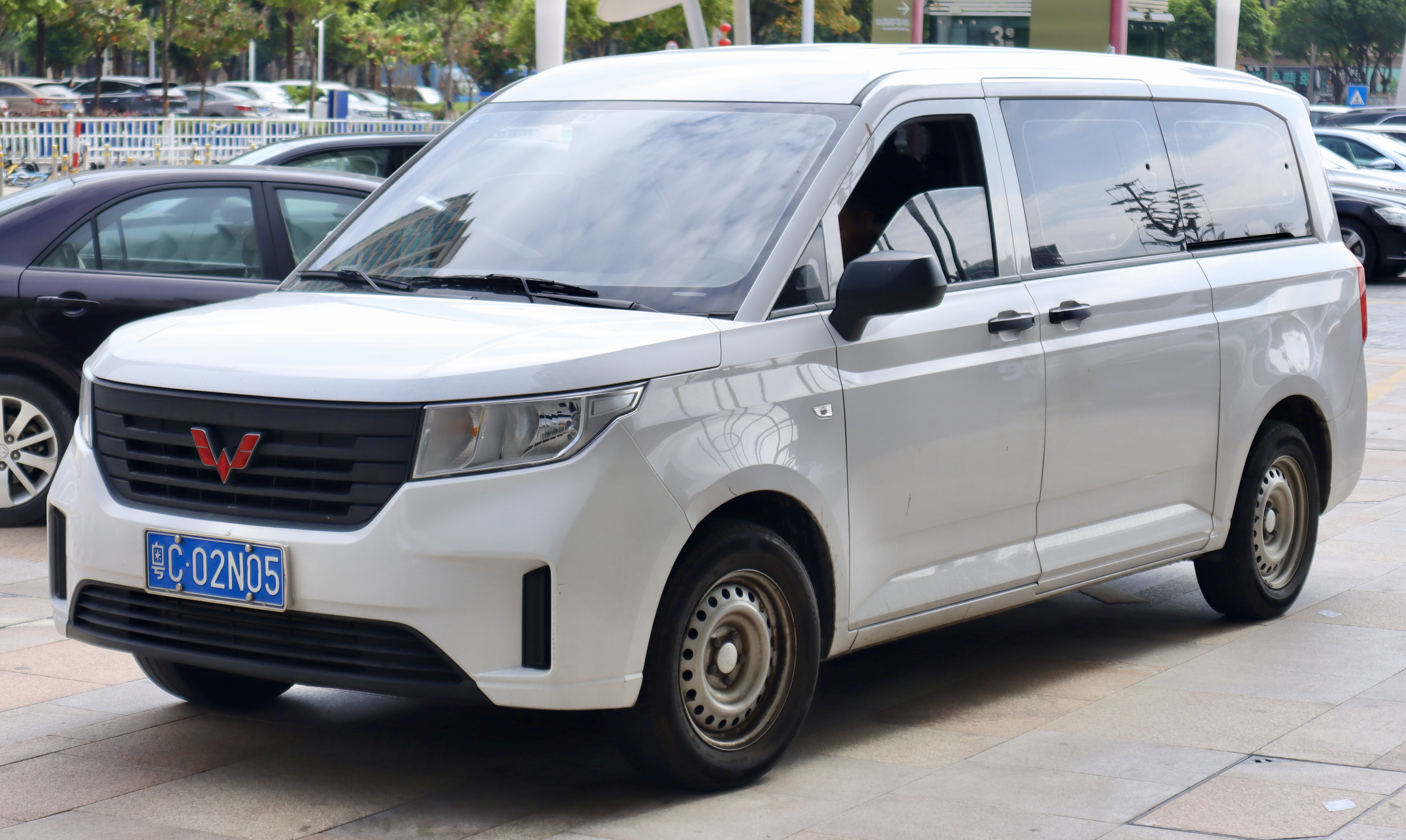

Overview
- Model code: CN150V/CN150VEV
- Also called: Wuling Journey
- Production: 2021–present
- Model years: 2022–present
- Assembly: China: Liuzhou, Guangxi

Body and chassis
- Layout: Front-engine, rear-wheel drive; Rear-motor, rear-wheel drive

Powertrain
- Engine: Petrol: 1.5 L I4; 1.5 L I4 turbo; 1.8 L I4
- Electric motor: 100 kW permanent magnet synchronous
- Transmission: 5-speed manual
- Electric range: 360 km (224 mi) (EV)

Dimensions
- Wheelbase: 3,180 mm (125.2 in)
- Length: 5,150 mm (202.8 in)
- Width: 1,840 mm (72.4 in)
- Height: 1,895 mm (74.6 in)

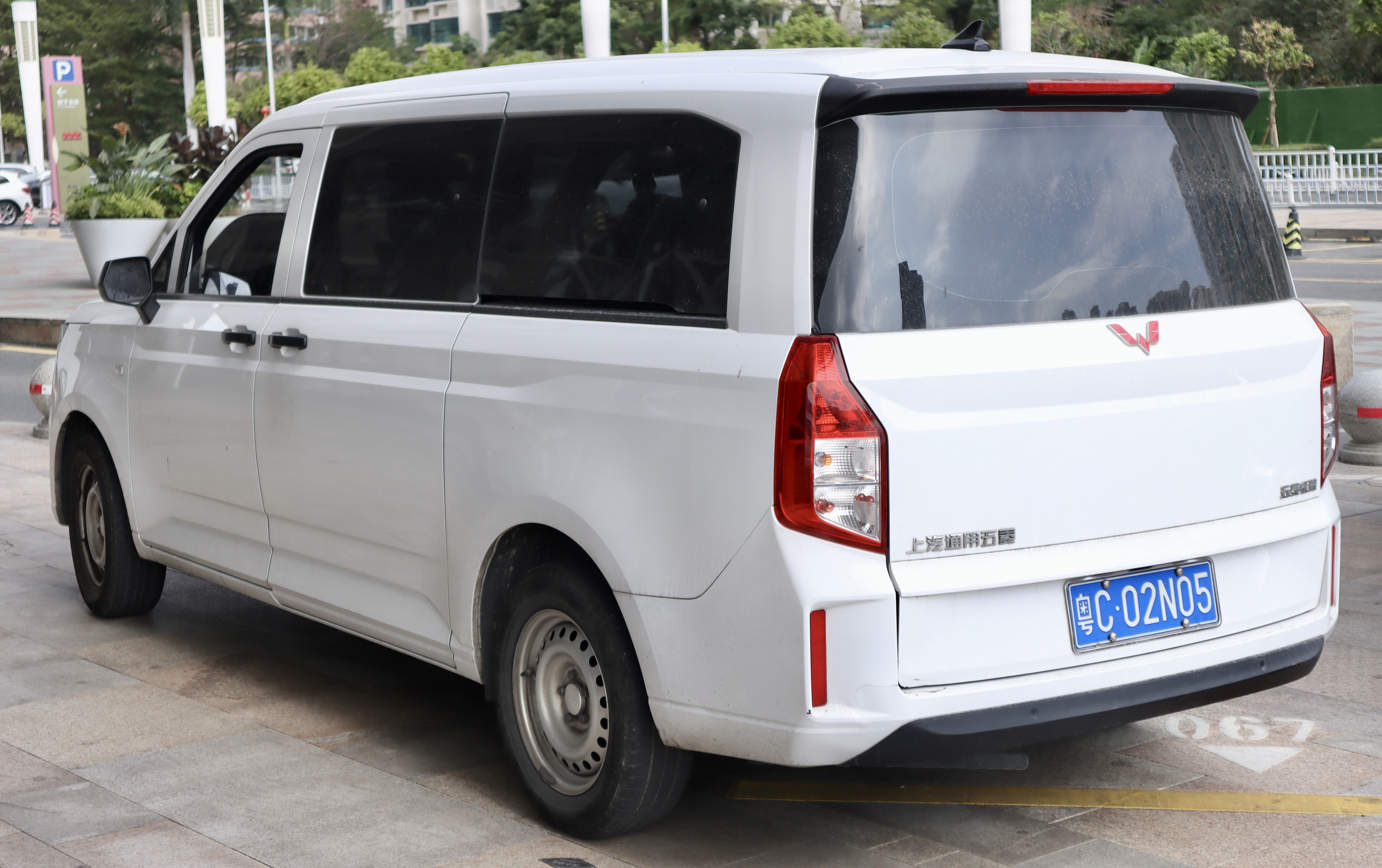
Wuling Zhengcheng II rear

The second generation Zhengcheng is longer, wider and lower. A 2-seater panel van model is also available for the second generation Zhengcheng. The second generation model was launched in August 2021. The model is offered as 7-, 8- and 9- seater variants. In September 2023, an electric variant went on sale with the same available seating configurations.

=== Powertrain ===
The power of the second generation Zhengcheng comes from a 1.5-litre turbo engine producing a maximum power of 147 PS (108 kW; 145 hp). The electric version has a 100 kW (134 hp; 136 PS) rear motor mounted behind the axle and has 360 kilometres (224 mi) of range with a top speed of 105 km/h (65 mph).

== Sales ==
Year	China
2023	7,746
2024	4,627
2025	2,349
