= Baojun RS-5 =

Compact crossover SUV

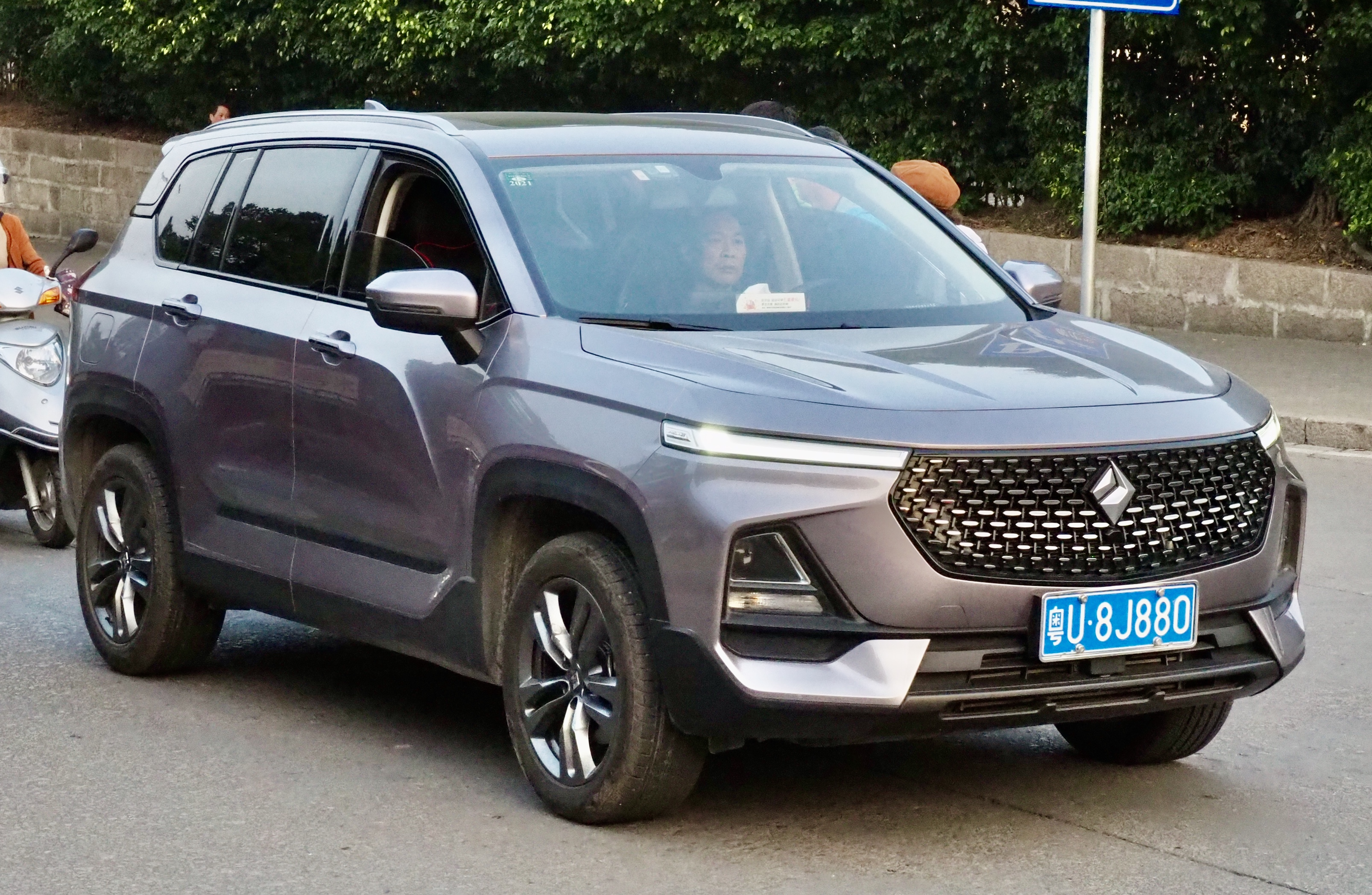

Overview
- Manufacturer: SAIC-GM-Wuling
- Production: 2018–2021

Body and chassis
- Class: Compact crossover SUV
- Body style: 5-door SUV
- Related: Baojun RC-5; Baojun RM-5

Powertrain
- Engine: 1.5 L LJO I4-T (petrol)
- Power output: 111 kW (149 hp; 151 PS) (1.5 L)
- Transmission: 6-speed manual; 8-speed CVT

Dimensions
- Wheelbase: 2,700 mm (106.3 in)
- Length: 4,570 mm (179.9 in)
- Width: 1,870 mm (73.6 in)
- Height: 1,705–1,720 mm (67.1–67.7 in)

The Baojun RS-5 is a compact crossover SUV produced by Baojun.

== Overview ==
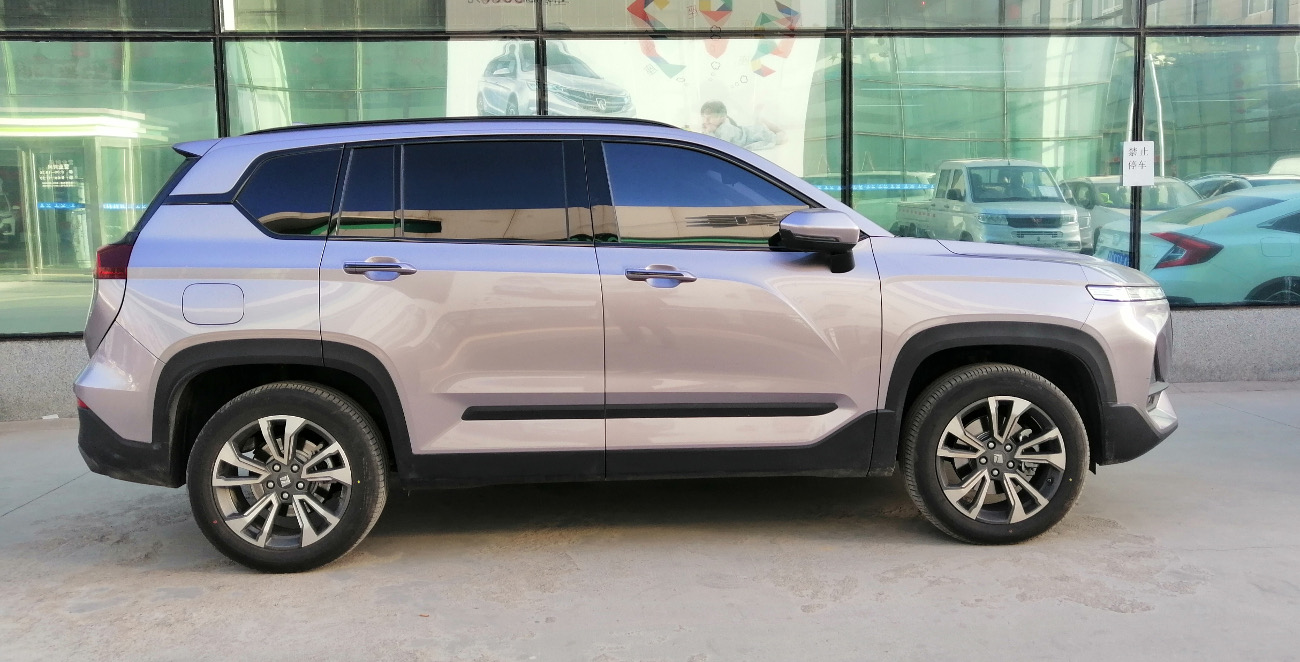
Side view

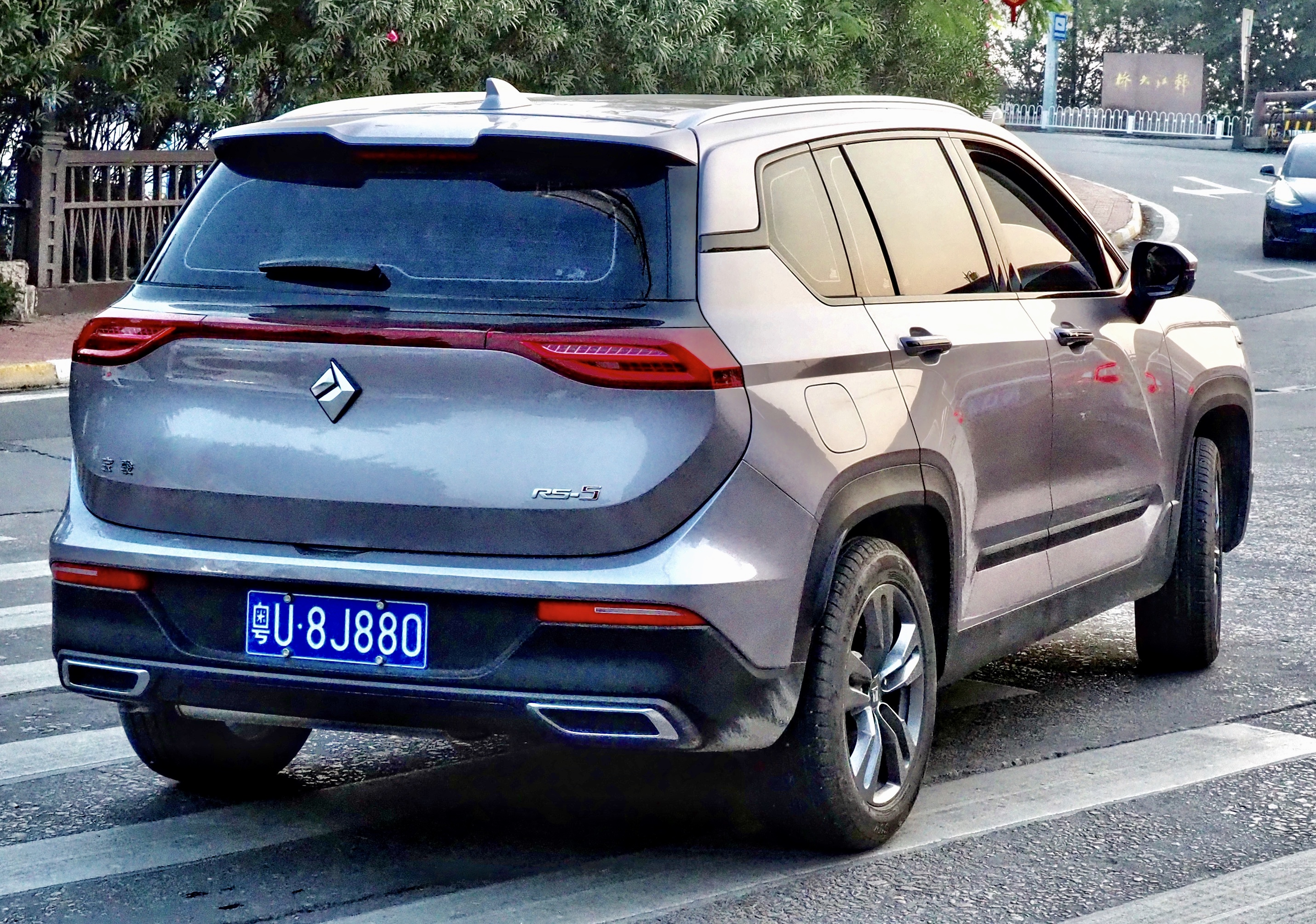
Rear view

The Baojun RS-5 was previously code named the CN210S and is positioned above the compact 530 crossover within Baojun's lineup. The car uses a new platform which has never been used before in Baojun vehicles. It is the first Baojun vehicle to be offered in alpha-numeric nomenclature, and is the first product of the 'New Baojun' sub-category and features the Interstellar Geometry design language of the brand. The RS-5 was launched at the 2018 Guangzhou Auto Show in December and the adoption of Baojun’s updated diamond-shaped logo debuted on the RS-5 when the production version was launched in April 2019.

Power of the Baojun RS-5 comes from a 1.5-liter turbocharged gasoline engine producing 151 PS (111 kW; 149 hp) and 250 N⋅m (180 lb⋅ft) of torque mated to a CVT automatic that simulates eight fixed gear ratios. As for safety equipments, the Baojun RS-5 is equipped with ESP, ABS + EBD, VDC (vehicle dynamic control system), TCS (Traction Control System), HBA (brake assist system), HHC (Uphill Assist System), Electronics Parking Brake, Autohold, Tire Pressure Monitoring, ACC (Adaptive Cruise Control), LKA (Lane Keeping Assist), Lane Departure Warning System, Speed Limit Sign Warning, intelligent far and near light switch, emergency brake, and a 360 degree panoramic camera.

== Sales ==
Year	China	
Year	RS-5	PHEV
2023	22	3
2024	15	22
2025	1	1
