= Wuling E10 EV =

Battery electric microvan

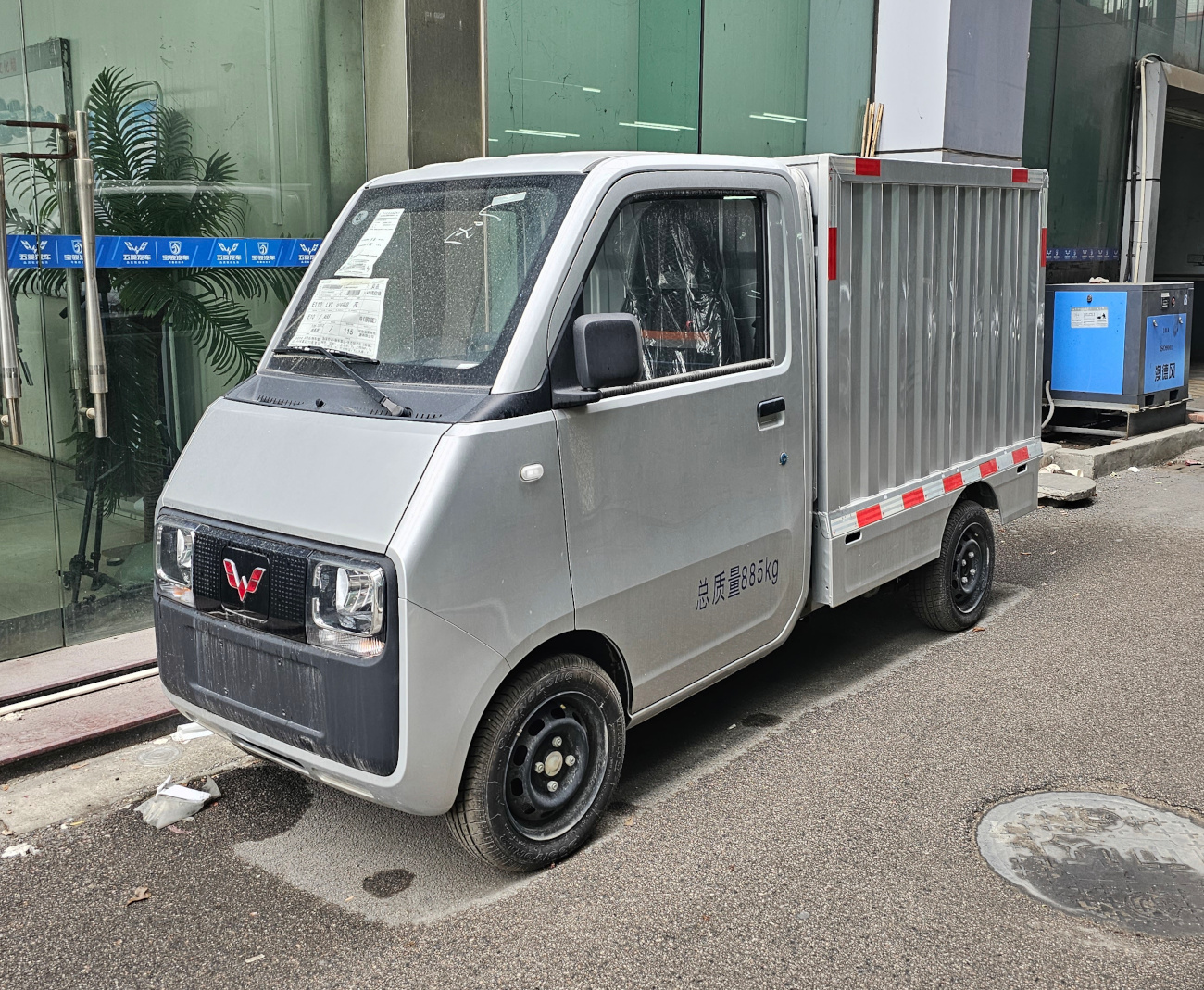
- The Wuling E10 EV in Zhuhai.

Overview
- Manufacturer: SAIC-GM-Wuling
- Production: 2023–2025
- Assembly: China: Liuzhou, Guangxi

Body and chassis
- Class: Microvan (A)
- Body style: 2-door van
- Layout: Front-wheel drive

Dimensions
- Wheelbase: 2,200 mm (86.6 in)
- Length: 3,305 mm (130.1 in)
- Width: 1,080 mm (42.5 in)
- Height: 1,690 mm (66.5 in)
- Curb weight: 620 kg (1,367 lb)

The Wuling E10 EV (Chinese: 五菱E10 EV) is a battery electric microvan manufactured by SAIC-GM-Wuling (SGMW) for 2023 to 2025 under the Wuling brand.

== Overview ==
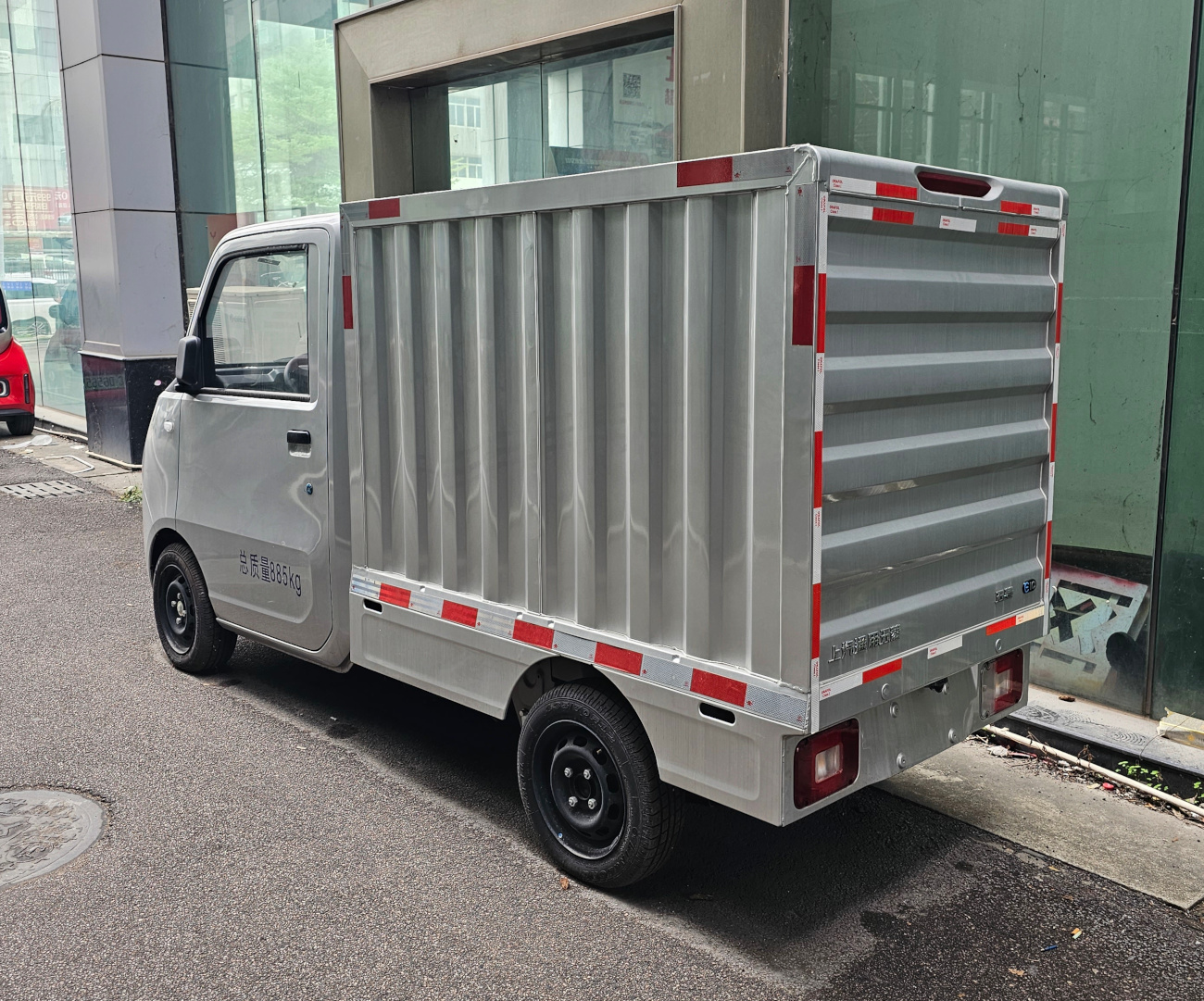
Rear view

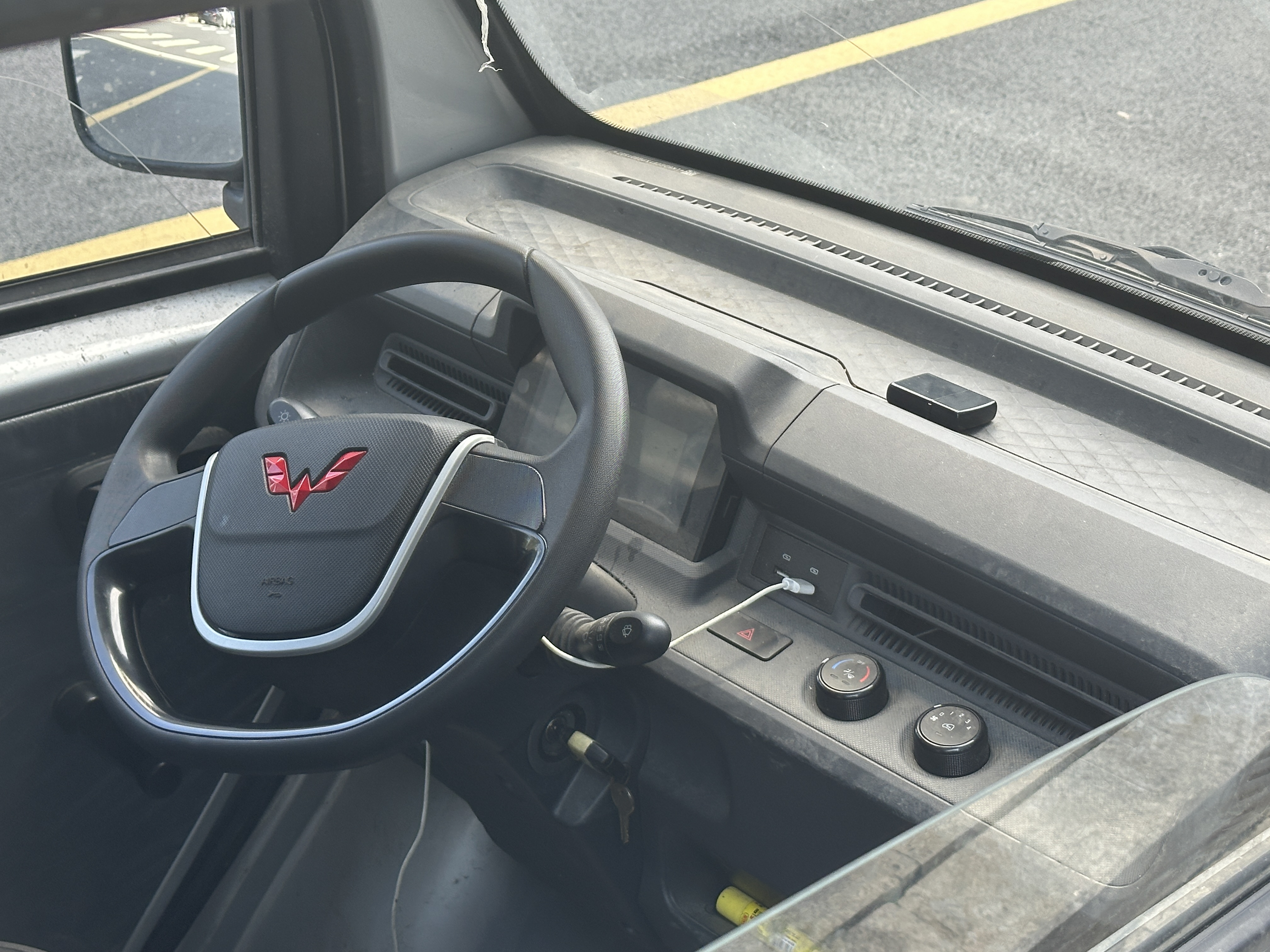
Interior

In November 2022, the Wuling was presented another microcar, this time with an unusual delivery vehicle concept. The E10 EV gained a 1.08 meter narrow body that could accommodate only the driver, which was distinguished by its characteristic angular design and small wheels. A simple, minimalist dashboard has only a small, monochrome display in front of the steering wheel and two physical switches for manual air conditioning to the right of the driver.

Behind the passenger cabin there is a transport compartment with a capacity of 1.7 cubic meters in the form of a permanently attached box with a regular, shapely shape. Access to it was made possible not only through the rear swing doors, but also through the same pair located on the side of the vehicle. With a relatively low weight of 620 kilograms, the load capacity of the E10 EV was 200 kilograms, and thanks to its small dimensions, the turning radius was 4.3 meters.

== Specifications ==
The E10 EV was powered by a fully electric system created by a 29 HP engine, the maximum speed of which was limited to 70 km/h. According to Wuling, a small battery with a capacity of 9 kWh will allow the vehicle to travel up to 150 kilometers on a single charge at an average speed of 40 km/h in urban conditions.
