= Wuling Longka =

Mid-size truck

Overview
- Manufacturer: SAIC-GM-Wuling
- Production: 2023–present
- Assembly: China: Liuzhou, Guangxi

Body and chassis
- Class: Mid-size truck
- Body style: 2-door truck

Dimensions
- Wheelbase: 3,350 mm (131.9 in)
- Length: 5,640 mm (222.0 in)
- Width: 2,020 mm (79.5 in)
- Height: 2,096 mm (82.5 in)
- Curb weight: 1,340–3,495 kg (2,954–7,705 lb)

The Wuling Longka (Chinese: 五菱龙卡) is a mid-size truck manufactured by SAIC-GM-Wuling (SGMW) since 2023 under the Wuling brand.

== Overview ==
Rear view

In May 2023, the Wuling was introduced a new series in its product line, the Longka. The Longka is a 3.5 ton cab-over light truck only available with a single row cabin, and a drive unit placed between the seats. The interior cabin featured an 8-inch multimedia screen mounted atop the cockpit.

The Longka is powered by a naturally aspirated, 2-liter gasoline engine producing 134 hp and a top speed limited to 105 km/h. The unit is paired exclusively with a 5-speed manual gearbox.
