= Wuling Yangguang L =

Battery electric van

- The Wuling Yangguang L in Shanghai.

Overview
- Manufacturer: SAIC-GM-Wuling
- Production: 2026–present
- Assembly: China: Liuzhou, Guangxi

Body and chassis
- Class: Light commercial vehicle
- Body style: 5-door van
- Layout: Rear-motor, rear-wheel-drive

Powertrain
- Electric motor: Permanent magnet synchronous
- Power output: 82–102 PS (60–75 kW; 81–101 hp) (electric motor)

Dimensions
- Wheelbase: 3,230 mm (127.2 in)
- Length: 5,125 mm (201.8 in)
- Width: 1,840 mm (72.4 in)
- Height: 1,985 mm (78.1 in)
- Curb weight: 1,760 kg (3,880 lb)

The Wuling Yangguang L (Chinese: 五菱扬光L) is a battery electric light commercial van manufactured by SAIC-GM-Wuling (SGMW) since 2026 under the Wuling brand. It is slightly larger than the Yangguang and slightly smaller than the Yangguang Pro launched slightly before it.

== Overview ==
Rear view (SWB)

Rear view (LWB)

The Yangguang L was launched on 24 September 2026 as an fully electric urban logistics van by Wuling, positioned between the regular Yangguang and Yangguang Pro, and specially designed for the needs of urban logistics and distribution. It is available in two-seater cargo or 6-seater passenger variants at launch.

The Yangguang L is equipped with batteries optimized for urban logistics vehicles developed jointly by CATL and Wuling. The batteries feature the Feiliu Smart 2.0 thermal control system and MUST structure technology, with the battery cells utilizing high-temperature self-inhibition technology for fast charging, allowing a battery cycle life of 10,000 times at 25 °C and 5,000 times at 45 °C.

== Specifications ==
The Yangguang L is equipped with a permanent magnet synchronous electric motor powering the rear axle, with the output of which reaching 100 kW (140 PS; 130 hp) and 200 N·m. The EPS is standard. Ranges covers 410km, 420km, 485km, and 500km.
