= Maxus G50 =

Chinese minivan

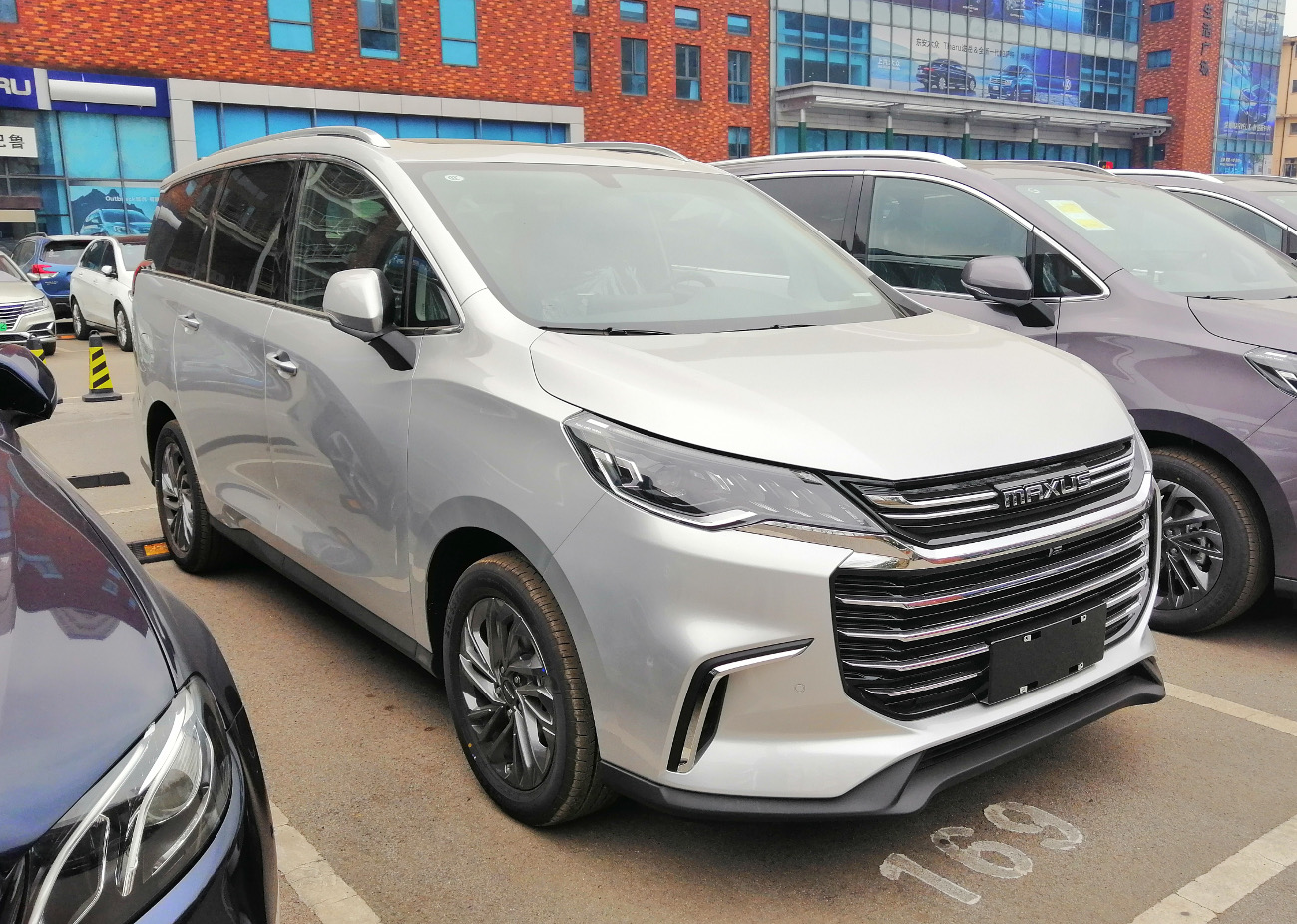

Overview
- Manufacturer: Maxus (SAIC Motor)
- Also called: MG G50 / G50 Plus (Philippines, Taiwan, Vietnam)
- Production: 2019–present
- Assembly: China: Wuxi; Taiwan: Miaoli (China Motor)

Body and chassis
- Class: Compact MPV
- Body style: 5-door minivan
- Layout: Front-engine, front-wheel-drive

Powertrain
- Engine: Petrol; 1.3 L I4 turbo; 1.5 L I4
- Electric motor: 116 hp (87 kW) permanent magnet synchronous (Euniq 5)
- Transmission: 6-speed manual; 7-speed DCT

Dimensions
- Wheelbase: 2,800 mm (110.2 in)
- Length: 4,825 mm (190.0 in)
- Width: 1,825 mm (71.9 in)
- Height: 1,778 mm (70.0 in)
- Curb weight: 1,550–1,570 kg (3,417–3,461 lb)

The Maxus G50 is a compact MPV manufactured by SAIC Motor and sold under its Maxus division. It is also sold in export markets as the MG G50 / G50 Plus.

== Overview ==
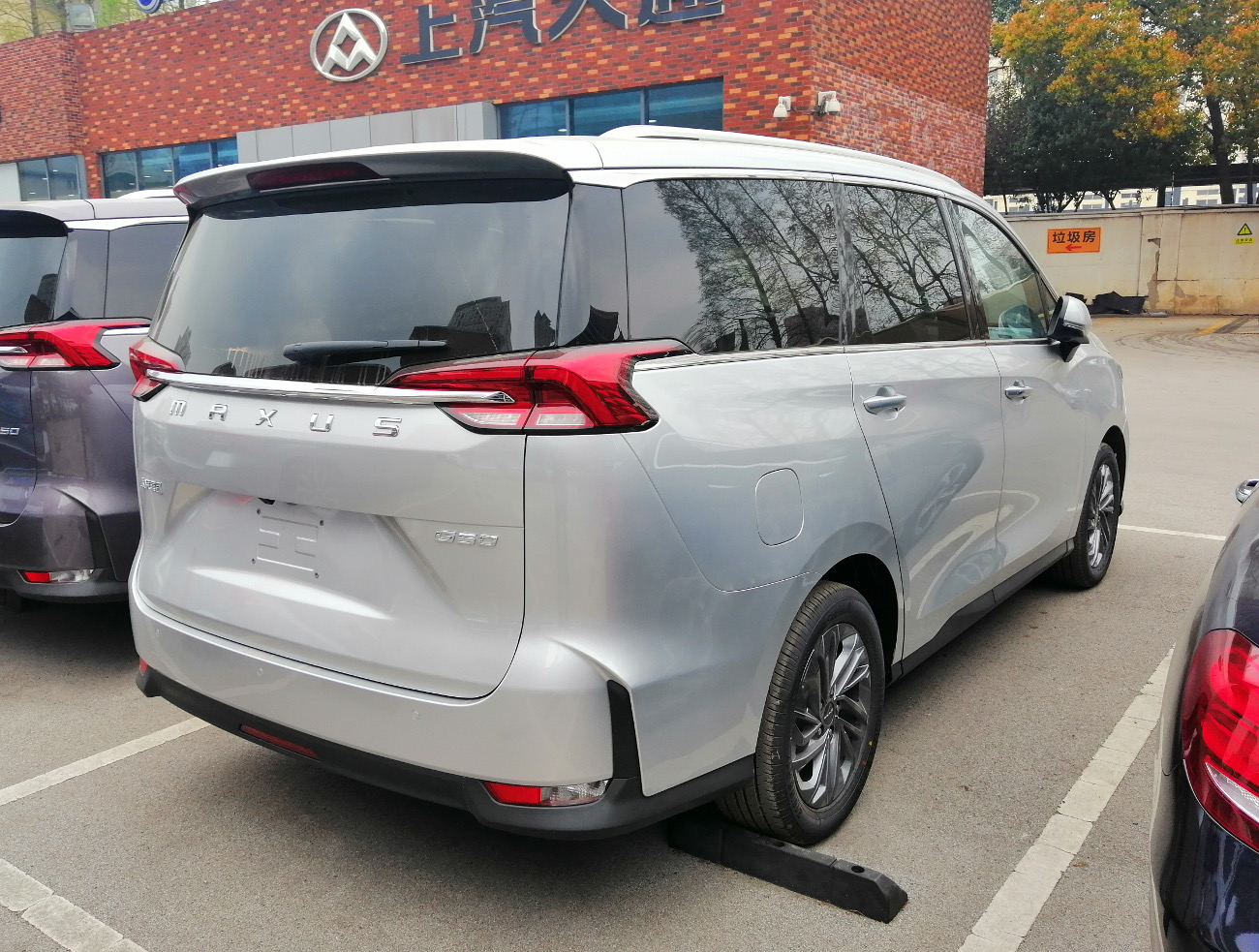
Rear view

The G50 is the second MPV under the Maxus brand following the larger Maxus G10, which is a sub-brand owned by the Shanghai Automotive Industry Corporation (SAIC).

In the Chinese market, the Maxus G50 was launched with two powertrain options including a 1.3-liter inline-4 turbo engine producing 163 hp (122 kW) and 230 Nm and a 1.5-liter inline-4 turbo engine producing 169 hp (126 kW) and 250 Nm.

Transmission options include a 6-speed manual transmission and a 7-speed dual-clutch transmission.

== Maxus Euniq 5 (2019–2023) ==
The Maxus Euniq 5 (formerly called EG50) is the electric version of the gasoline-powered Maxus G50. The Euniq 5 was launched during the Shanghai Auto Show in April 2019. Styling-wise, the Euniq 5 is mostly the same as the G50 while adding blue accents in the grilles and intakes to differentiate it from the gasoline variant.

The Euniq 5 is powered by an electric motor producing 116 hp (87 kW).

It is exported to some European countries such as Spain and Finland.

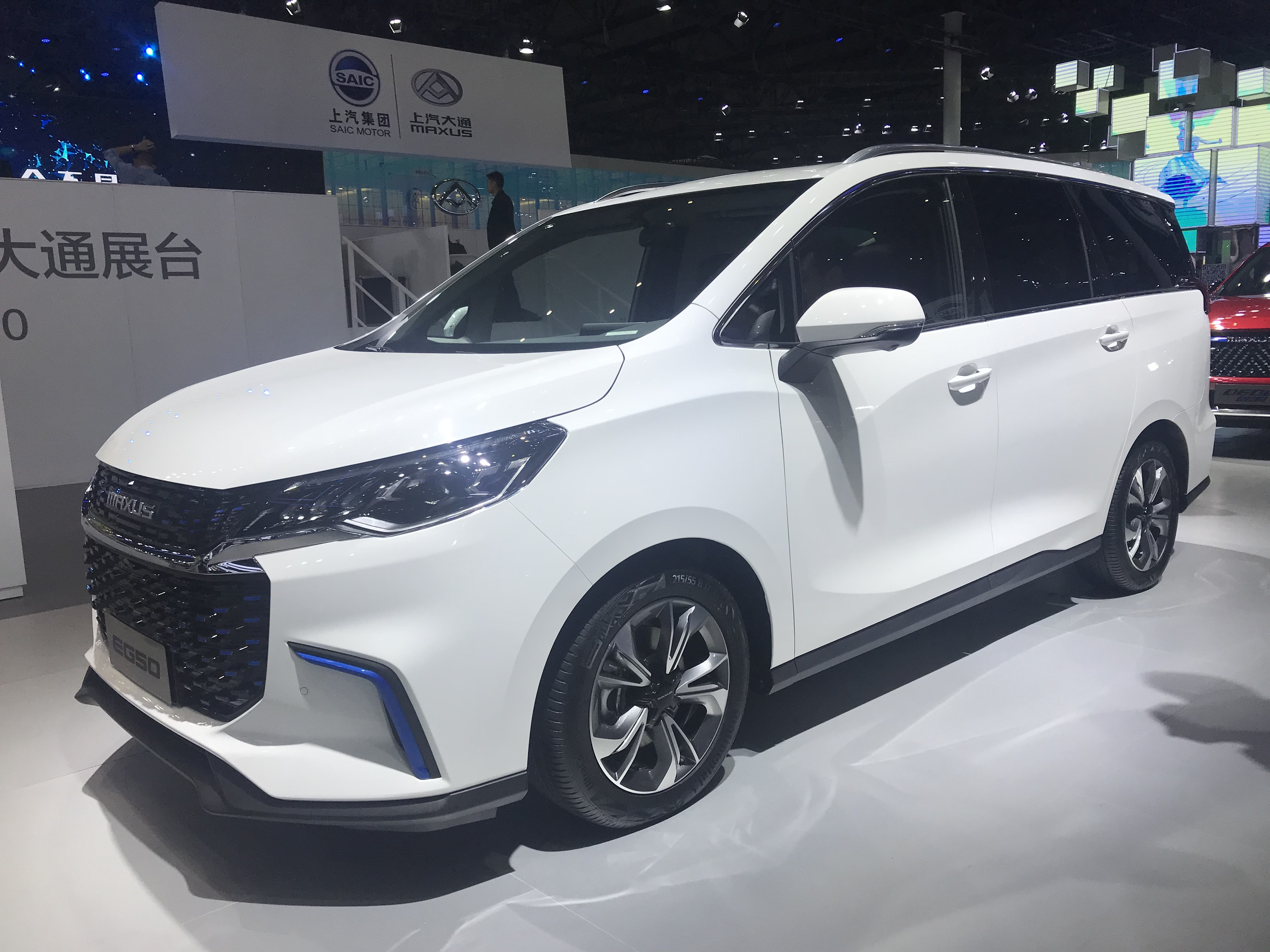
Maxus EG50

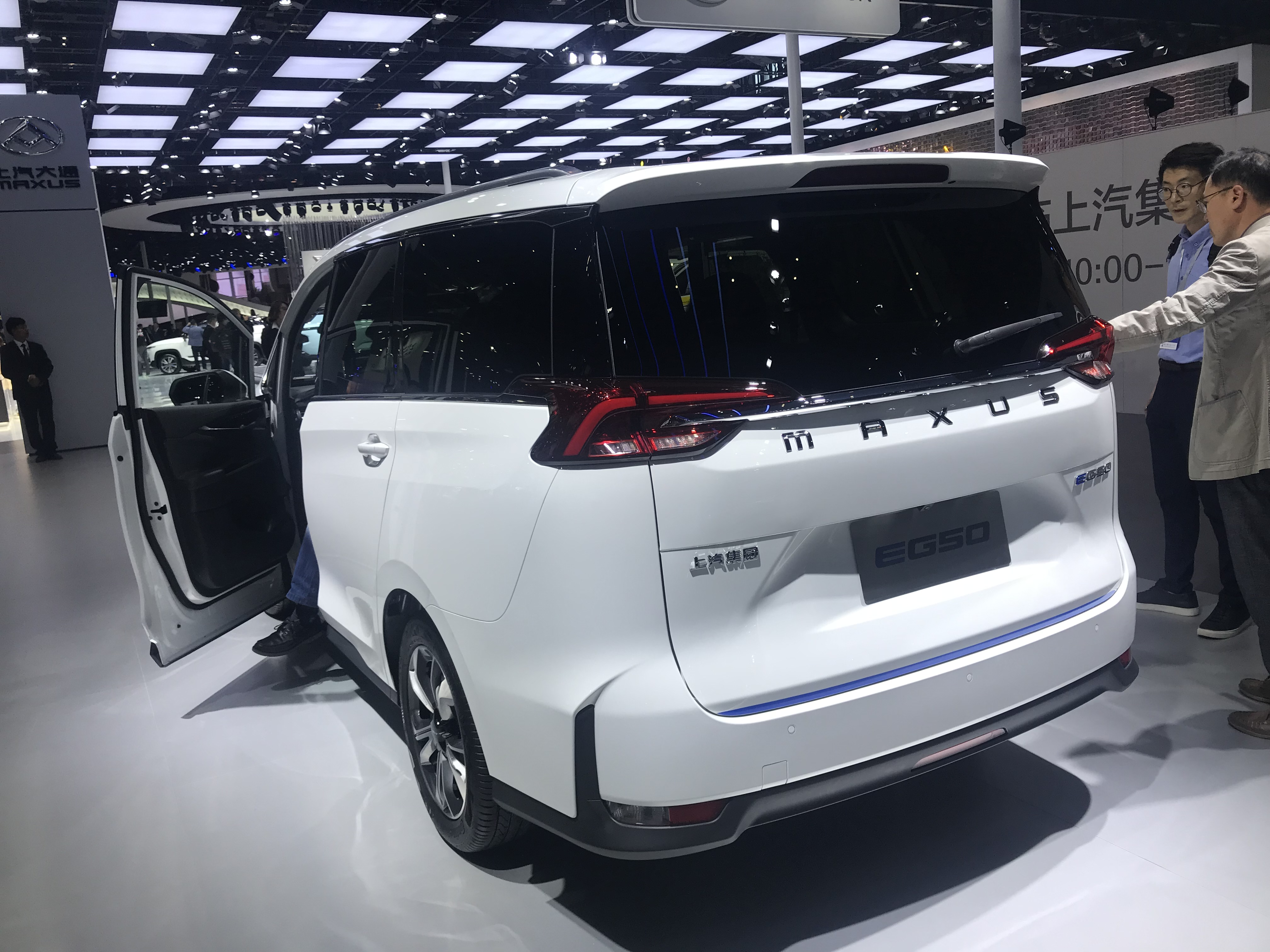
Rear view

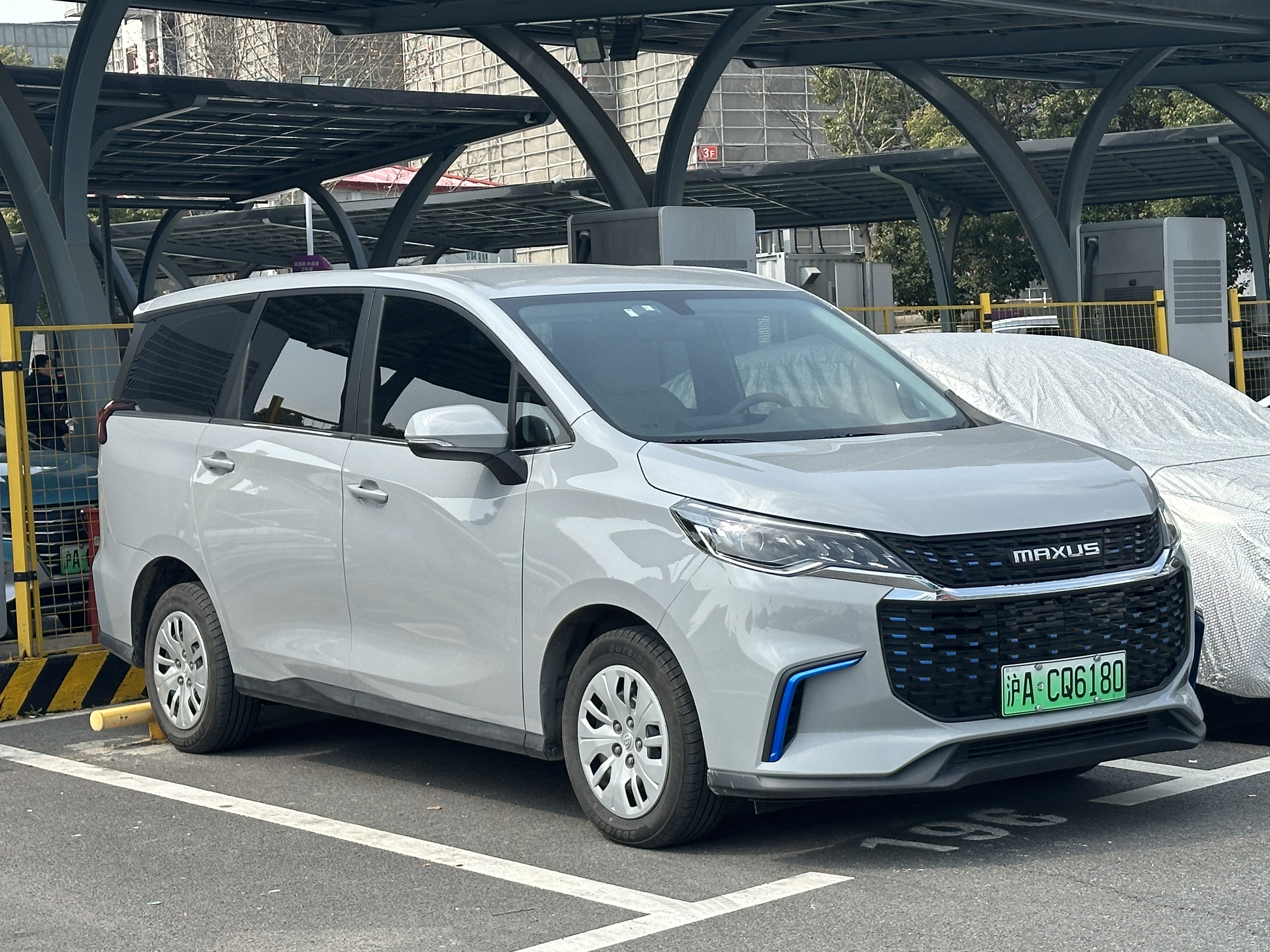
Maxus Euniq 5

== Maxus Mifa 5 (2023–2025) ==
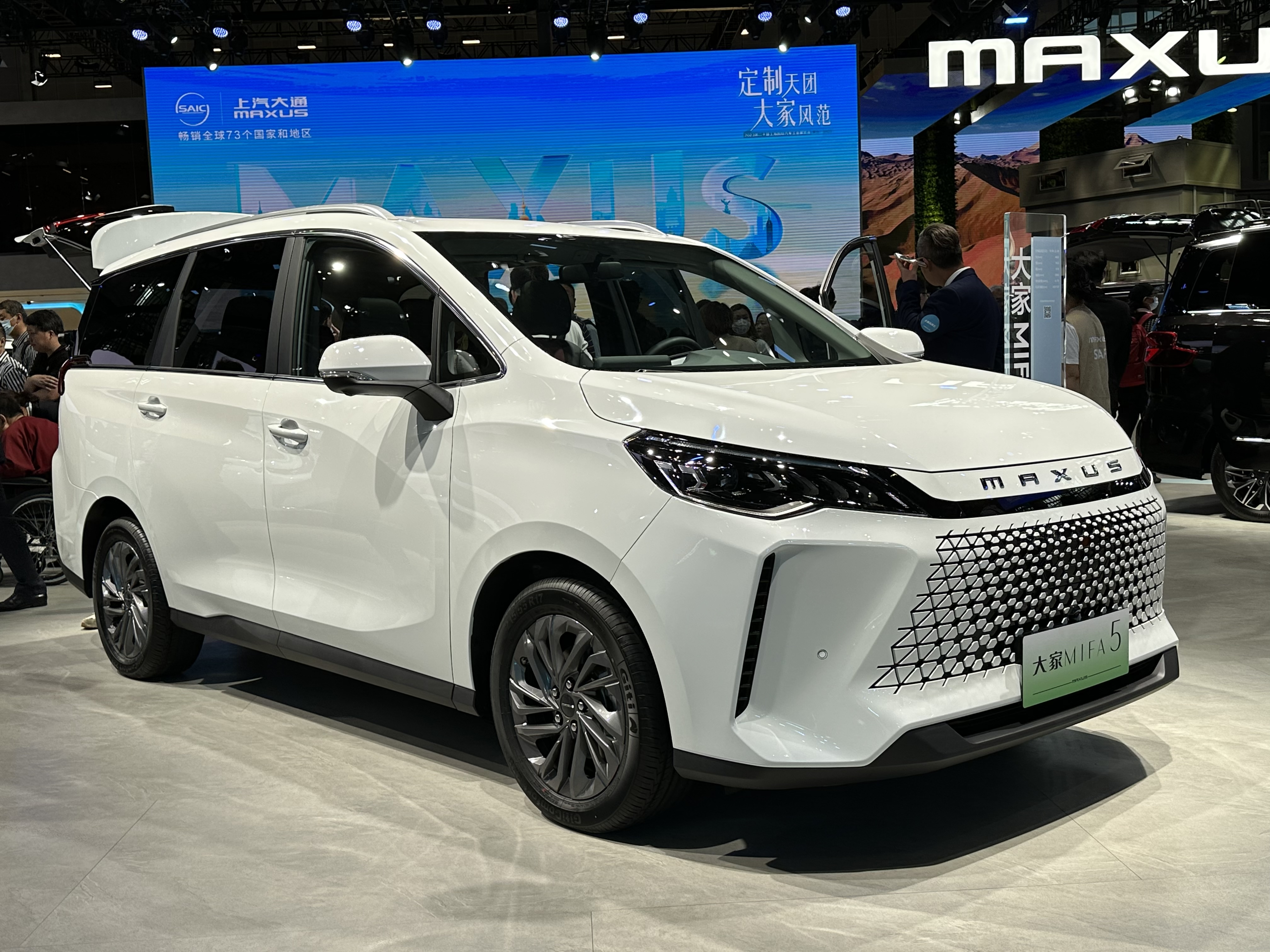
Maxus Mifa 5

The Maxus Mifa 5 was introduced during the 2022 Chengdu Auto Show in August 2022. The Maxus Mifa 5 is also an electric version of the gasoline-powered Maxus G50, and was launched to replace the Euniq 5 phased out in 2023. The Mifa 5 is powered by a permanent magnet synchronous motor with a maximum power output of 170 hp (130 kW) and 310 Nm of torque. The battery setup of the Mifa 5 is a choice of two ternary lithium battery packs with a capacity of 61.1 kWh with a range of 430 km (270 mi) and 70 kWh with a range of 520 km (320 mi) for different configurations.

== Maxus G50 Hybrid (2025–present) ==
Known as the MG G50 Max PHEV in the Philippines, it is now the top selling new energy MPV in the country.

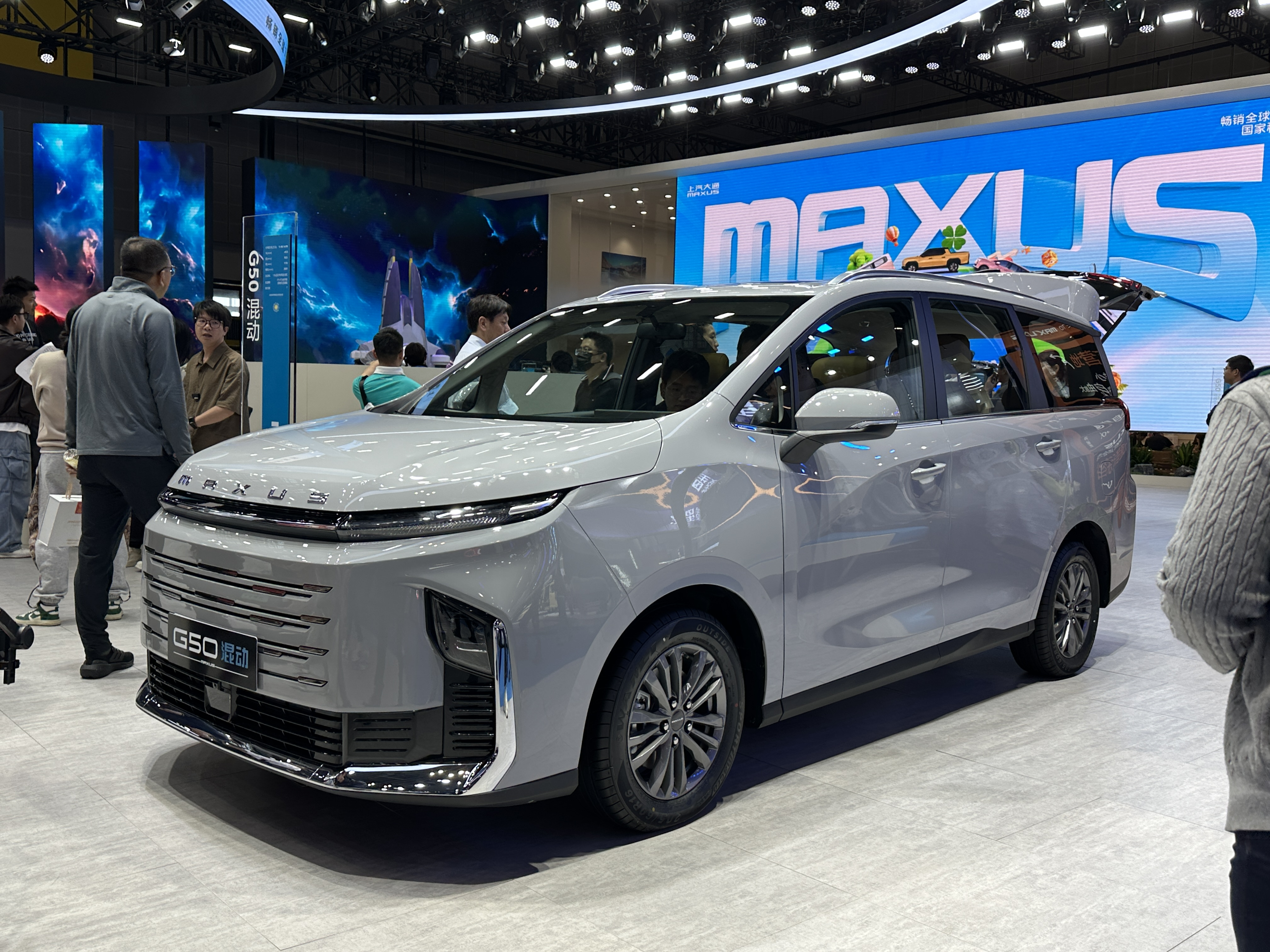
Maxus G50 Hybrid

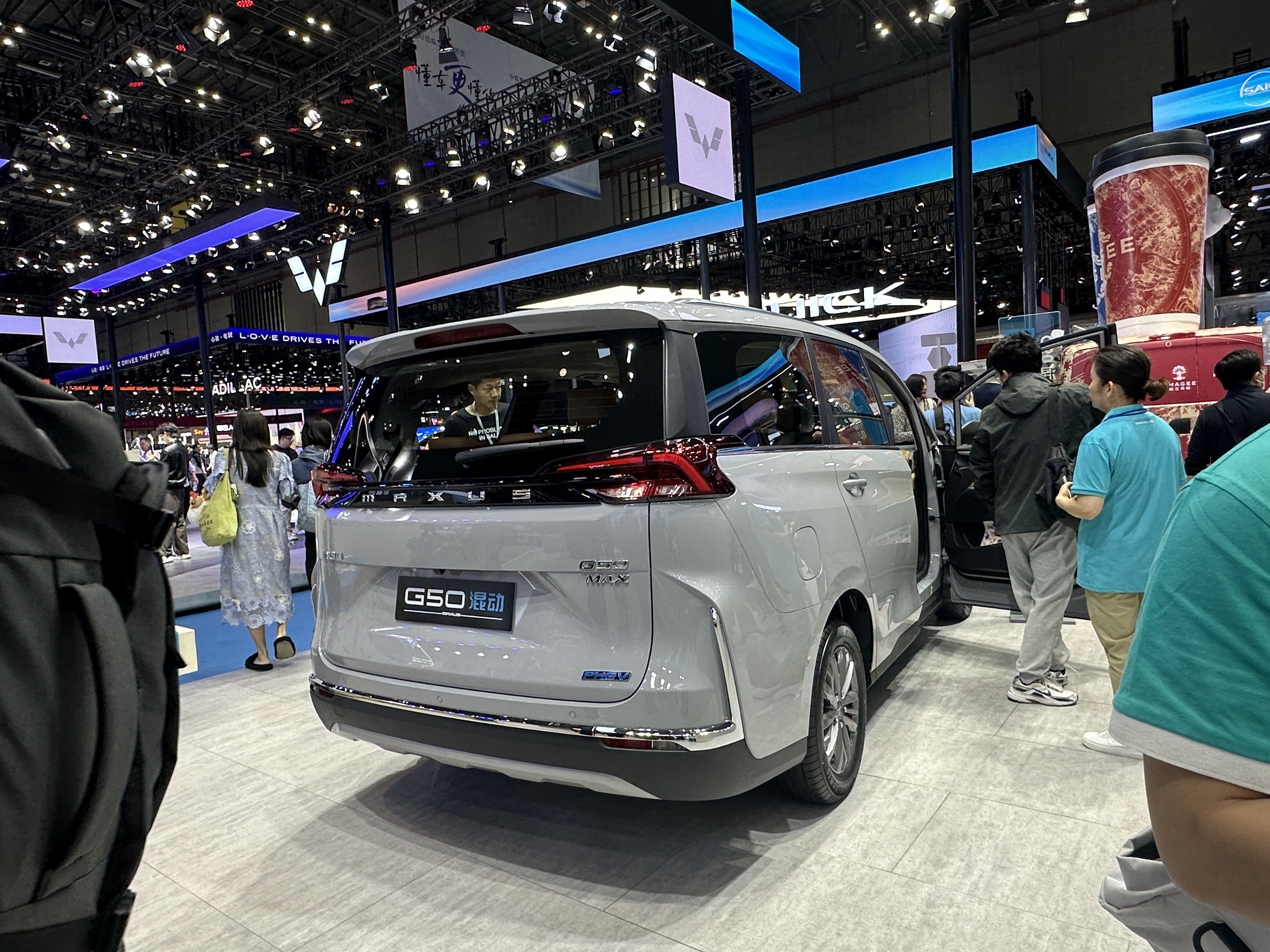
Rear view
