= Wuling Zhengtu =

Mid-size pickup truck

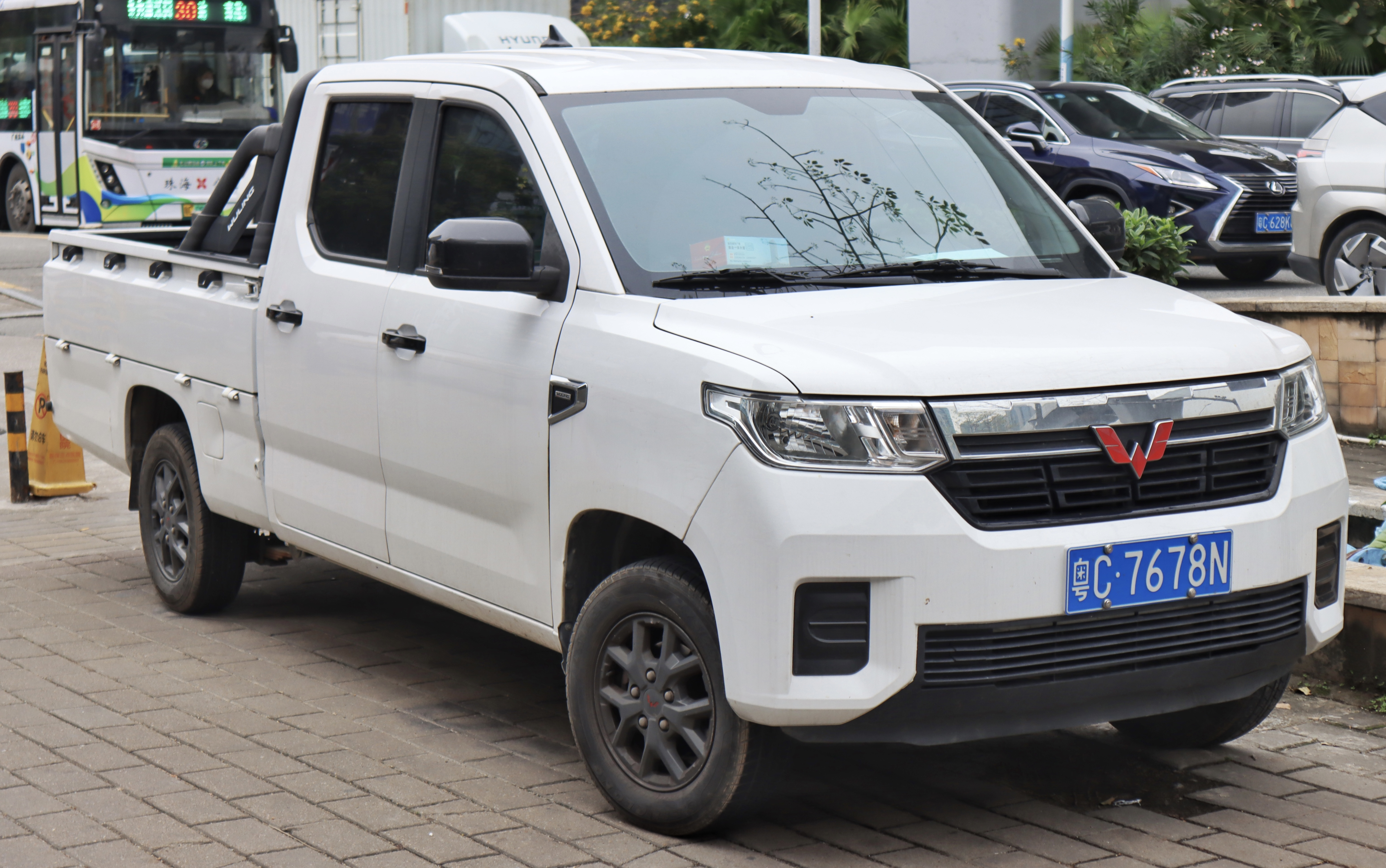

Overview
- Manufacturer: SAIC-GM-Wuling
- Model code: CN110P
- Production: 2021–2025
- Assembly: China: Liuzhou, Guangxi

Body and chassis
- Class: Mid-size pickup truck
- Body style: 4-door pickup truck
- Layout: Front-engine, rear-wheel-drive

Powertrain
- Engine: 1.5 L I4
- Transmission: 5-speed manual

Dimensions
- Wheelbase: 3,160 mm (124.4 in)
- Length: 5,105 mm (201.0 in)
- Width: 1,640 mm (64.6 in)
- Height: 1,810 mm (71.3 in)
- Curb weight: 1,340 kg (2,954 lb)

The Wuling Zhengtu (Chinese: 五菱征途) is a mid-size pickup truck produced by SAIC-GM-Wuling under the Wuling brand for 2021 to 2025.

== Overview ==
The first information about the large, passenger-delivery pickup truck Wuling appeared in September 2020, when photos from the Chinese patent office showing the full exterior of the car appeared on the Internet. Initial photos and information about the vehicle were presented in January 2021.

The Zhengtu took the form of an angular pickup truck with an over 3-meter wheelbase, which was dictated by the combination of the personal characteristics of a four-door, four-seat passenger compartment combined with a spacious 2-meter-long transport compartment. The sides of the transport compartment are made of light metal and they enable the disassembly of all three walls.

The official presentation of Zhengtu took place in March 2021. While emphasizing the transport functionality of the vehicle, Wuling made the passenger compartment similar to the manufacturer's passenger models. The dashboard is decorated with an 8-inch touch screen of the multimedia system.

The range of power units was limited to the 1.5-liter four-cylinder gasoline engine, typical for Wuling models, developing 99 hp (74 kW) in cooperation with a five-speed manual transmission.

The Zhengtu was built with the Mainland Chinese market in mind, where its sales began just after its debut in March 2021. The manufacturer is not planning to export the pickup truck to foreign markets. The price for a subscript copy in China is the equivalent of USD 9,000.

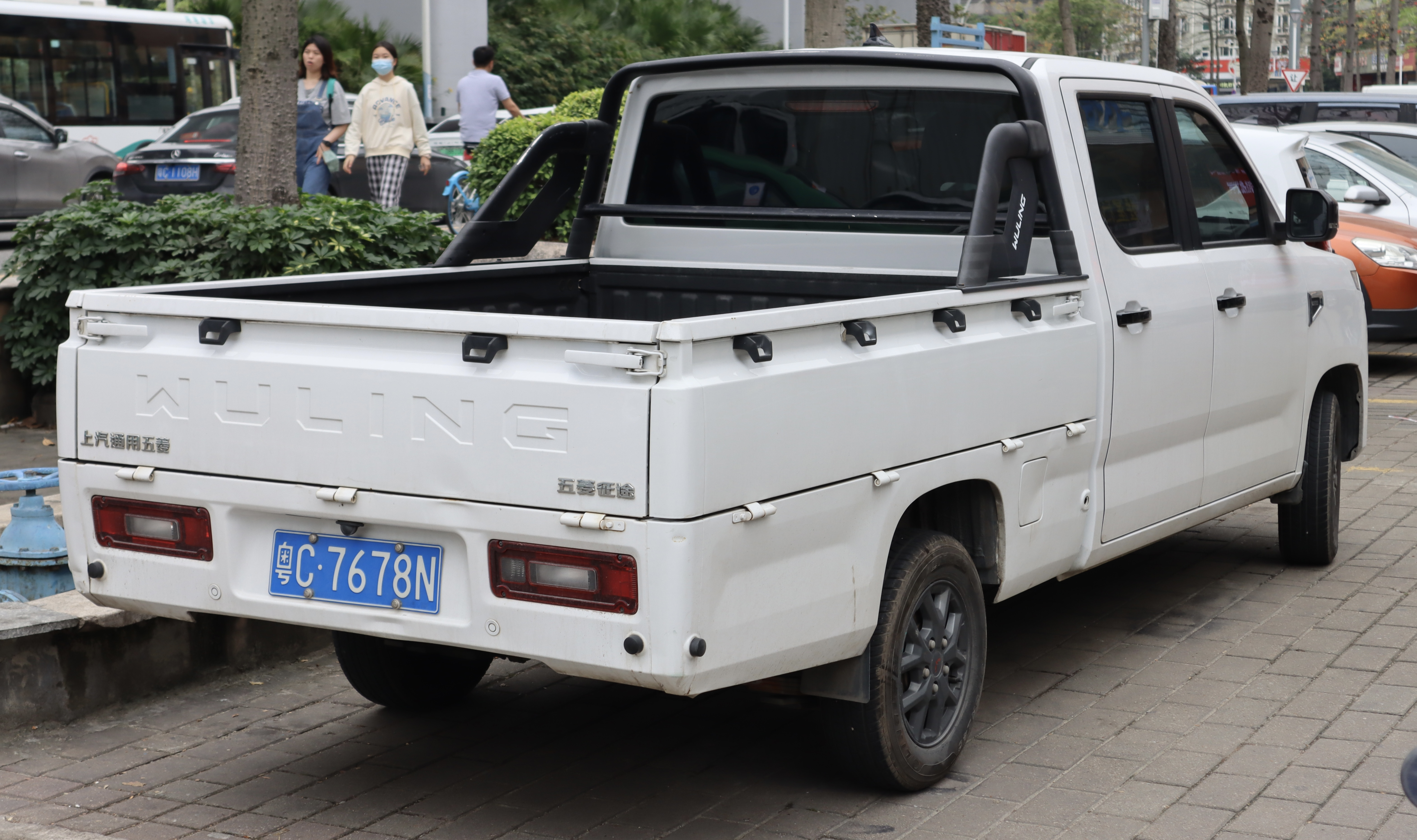
Rear view
