= Baojun RC-5 =

Mid-size car produced by SAIC-GM-Wuling

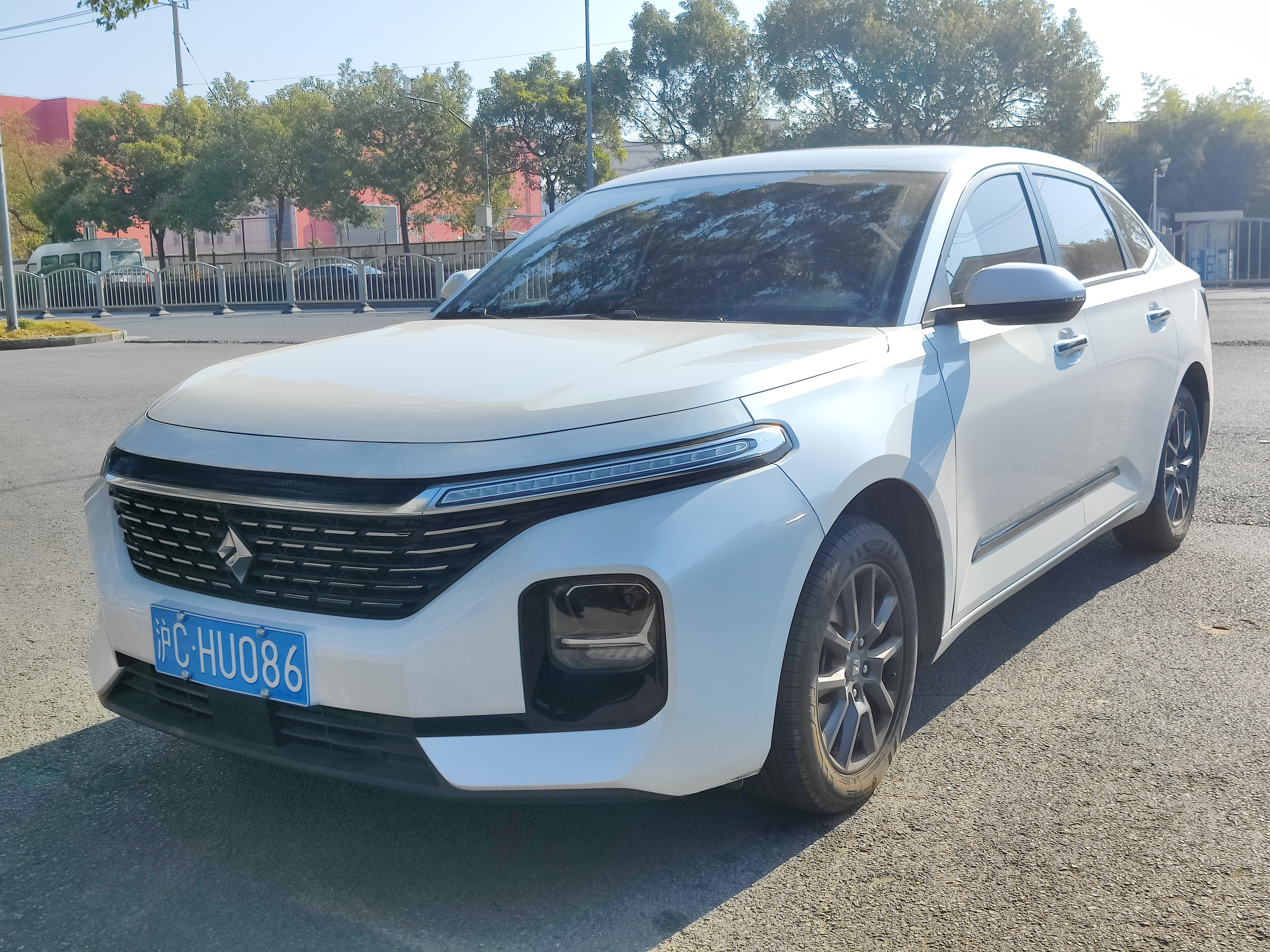

Overview
- Manufacturer: SAIC-GM-Wuling
- Also called: Baojun RC-5W (wagon version); Baojun Valli (wagon version)
- Production: 2020–2022
- Assembly: China: Liuzhou, Guangxi

Body and chassis
- Class: Mid-size car
- Body style: 4-door sedan 5-door station wagon
- Layout: FF layout or F4 layout

Powertrain
- Engine: 1.5 L LAR I4 (petrol); 1.5 L LJO I4-T (petrol)
- Transmission: CVT; 6-speed manual

Dimensions
- Wheelbase: 2,700 mm (106.3 in)
- Length: 4,650 mm (183.1 in)
- Width: 1,806 mm (71.1 in)
- Height: 1,458 mm (57.4 in)
- Curb weight: 1,250–1,410 kg (2,755.8–3,108.5 lb)

Chronology
- Predecessor: Baojun 630

The Baojun RC-5 is a mid-size car produced by SAIC-GM-Wuling through the Baojun brand. The RC-5 replaces the 630 sedan introduced in 2011.

== Overview ==
The RC-5 is a part of the 'New Baojun' sub-category and features the Interstellar Geometry design language of the brand. Available in sedan and station wagon (RC-5W) bodystyles, it shares the platform with the RS-5 SUV.

Launched in August 2020, local prices of the Baojun RC-5 models start from RMB59,800 (approximately $8,600 at the rates at the time) for the Baojun RC-5 liftback saloon which is exactly the same as the 630 compact sedan it replaces and RMB72,800 ($10,490) for the RC-5W wagon. The RC-5W wagon offers a cargo space of more than 470 L (16.6 cu ft) with all seats in place. The RC-5W also features a roof rack, reclining second row seats with airplane-like headrests and extra headroom compared to the RC-5 liftback sedan.

In June 2021, the wagon version was updated and relaunched as the Baojun Valli. The Valli nameplate of its name stands for the Goddess consort of the Hindu God Murugan.

=== Specifications ===
The engine lineup of the Baojun RC-5 includes two inline-four petrol engines with one being a 99 PS (73 kW; 98 hp) naturally aspirated 1.5-litre engine and the other one being a 147 PS (108 kW; 145 hp) turbocharged 1.5-litre engine. A six-speed manual gearbox and virtual eight-speed continuously variable transmission (CVT) is offered.

Both RC-5 models feature functions normally found in more premium vehicles according to Baojun, including dynamic turn signals, Baojun's next-generation infotainment system with voice control, wireless cellphone charging, powered seats with memory, and an intelligent air purification system. For safety features, the RC-5 and RC-5W is equipped with 17 advanced driver-assistance system (ADAS) functions. The functions are made possible by a combination of a high-resolution camera and millimeter wave radars with a range of 120 metres (390 ft; 130 yd) and 160 metres (520 ft; 170 yd).

Baojun RC-5

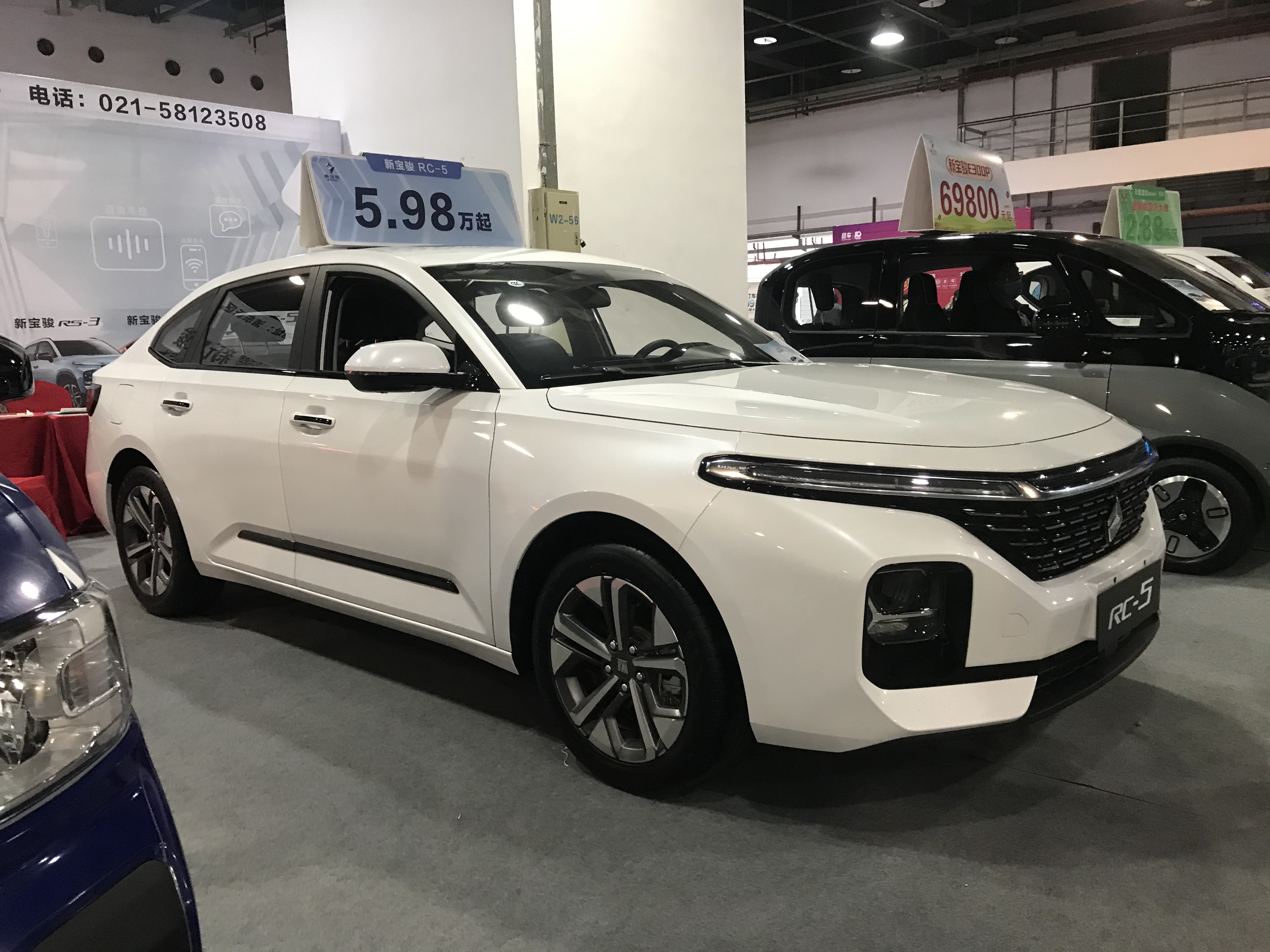
Baojun RC-5 front

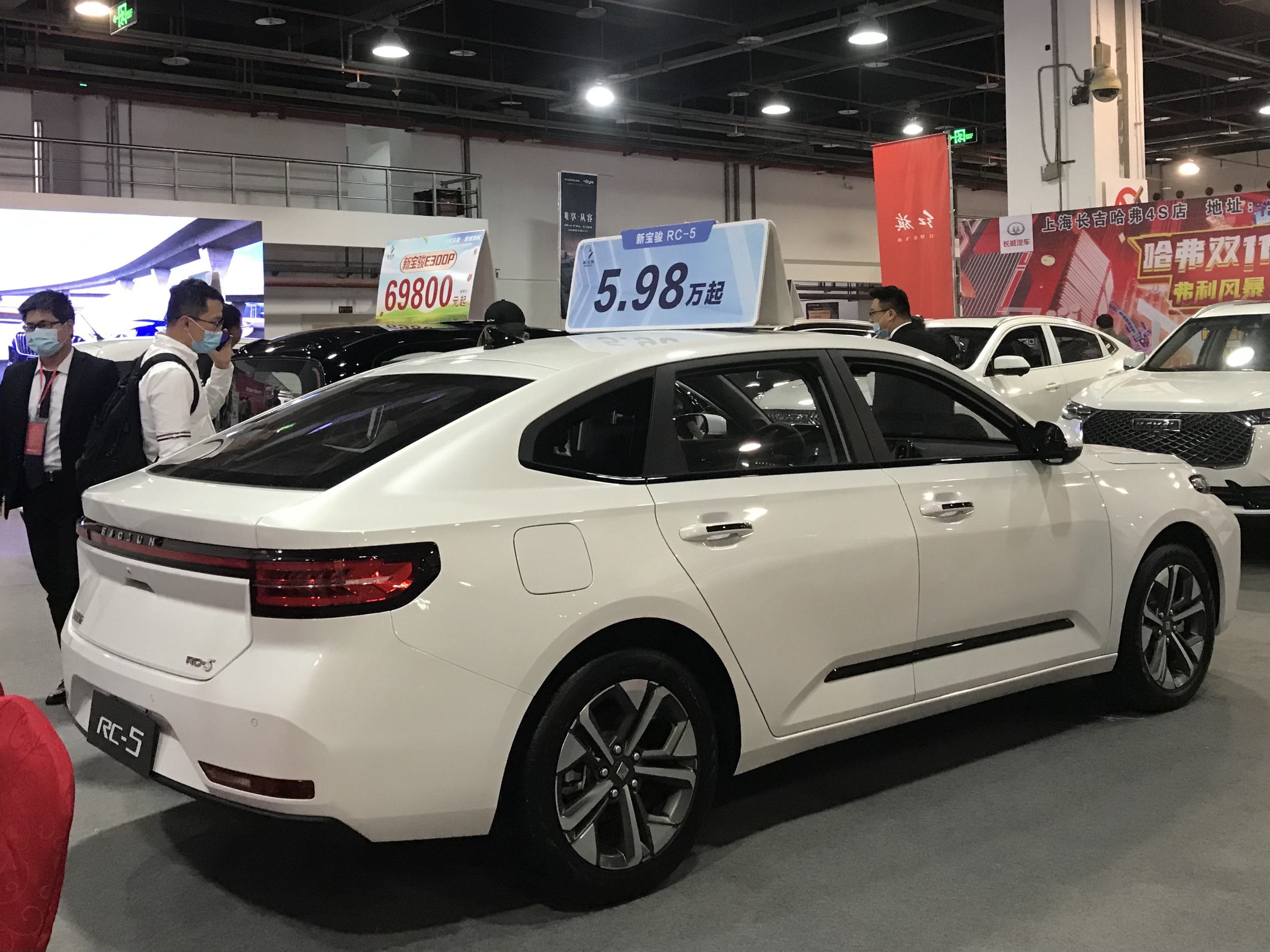
Baojun RC-5 rear

Baojun RC-5W

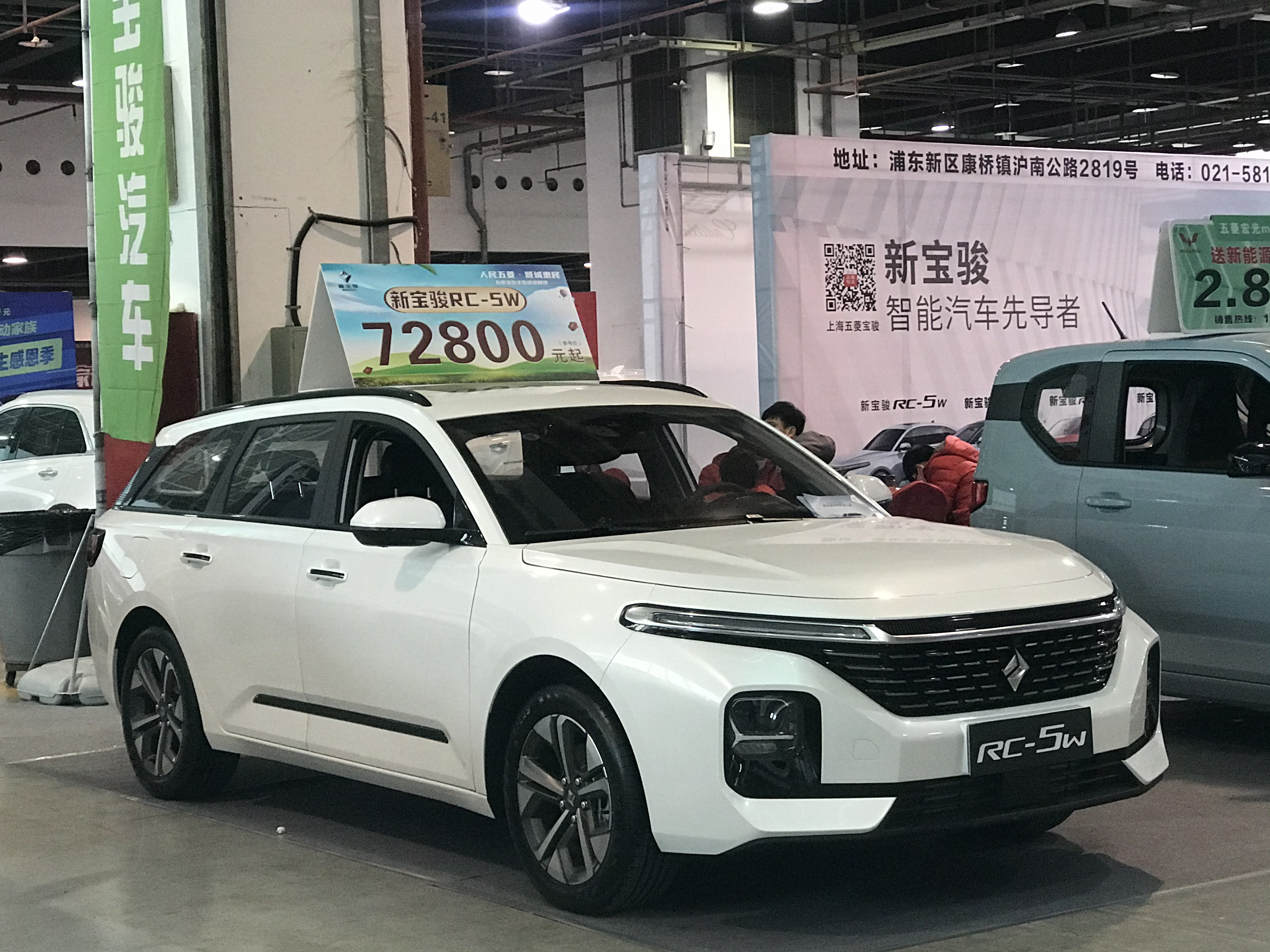
Baojun RC-5W front

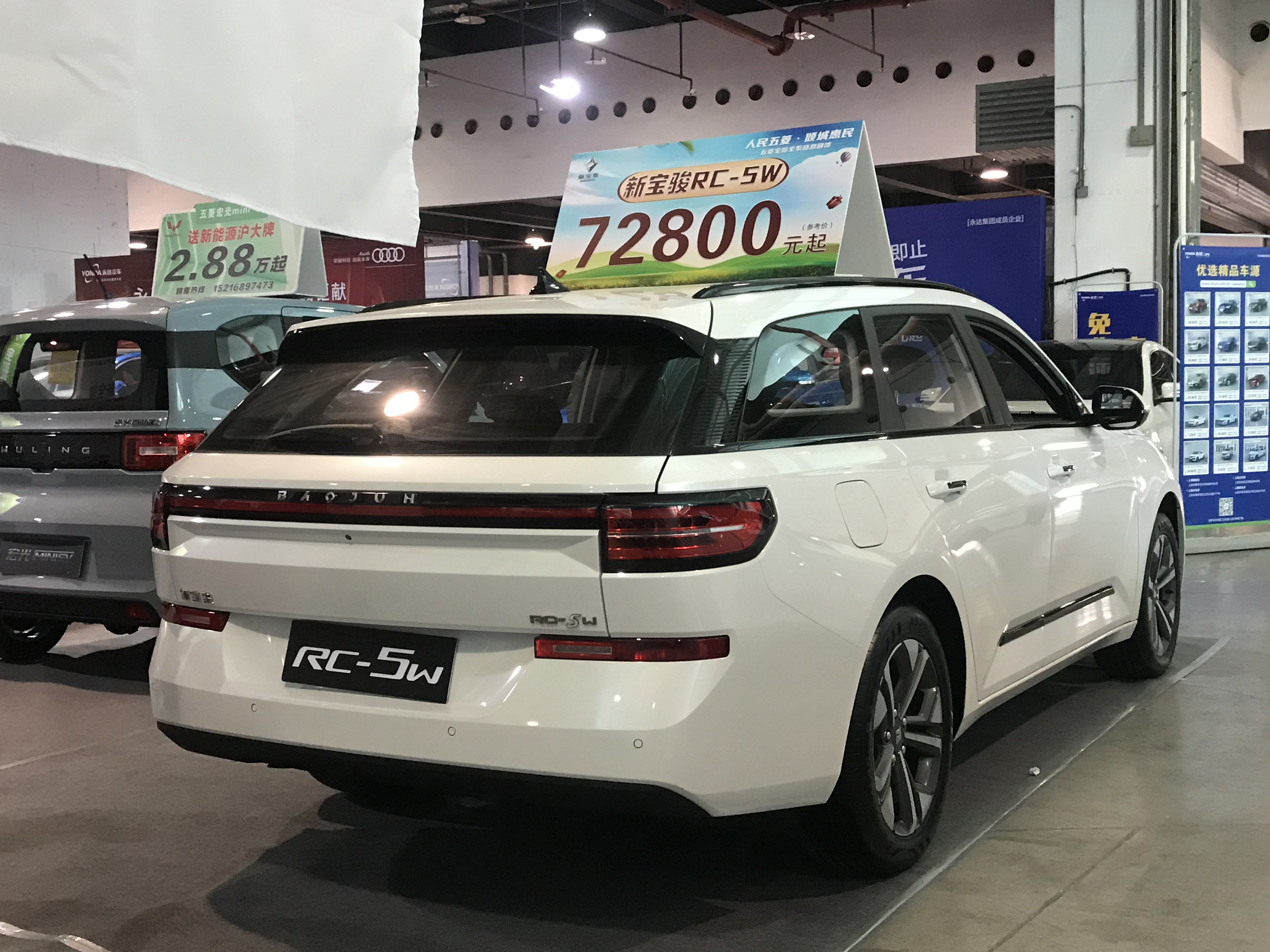
Baojun RC-5W rear

Baojun Valli

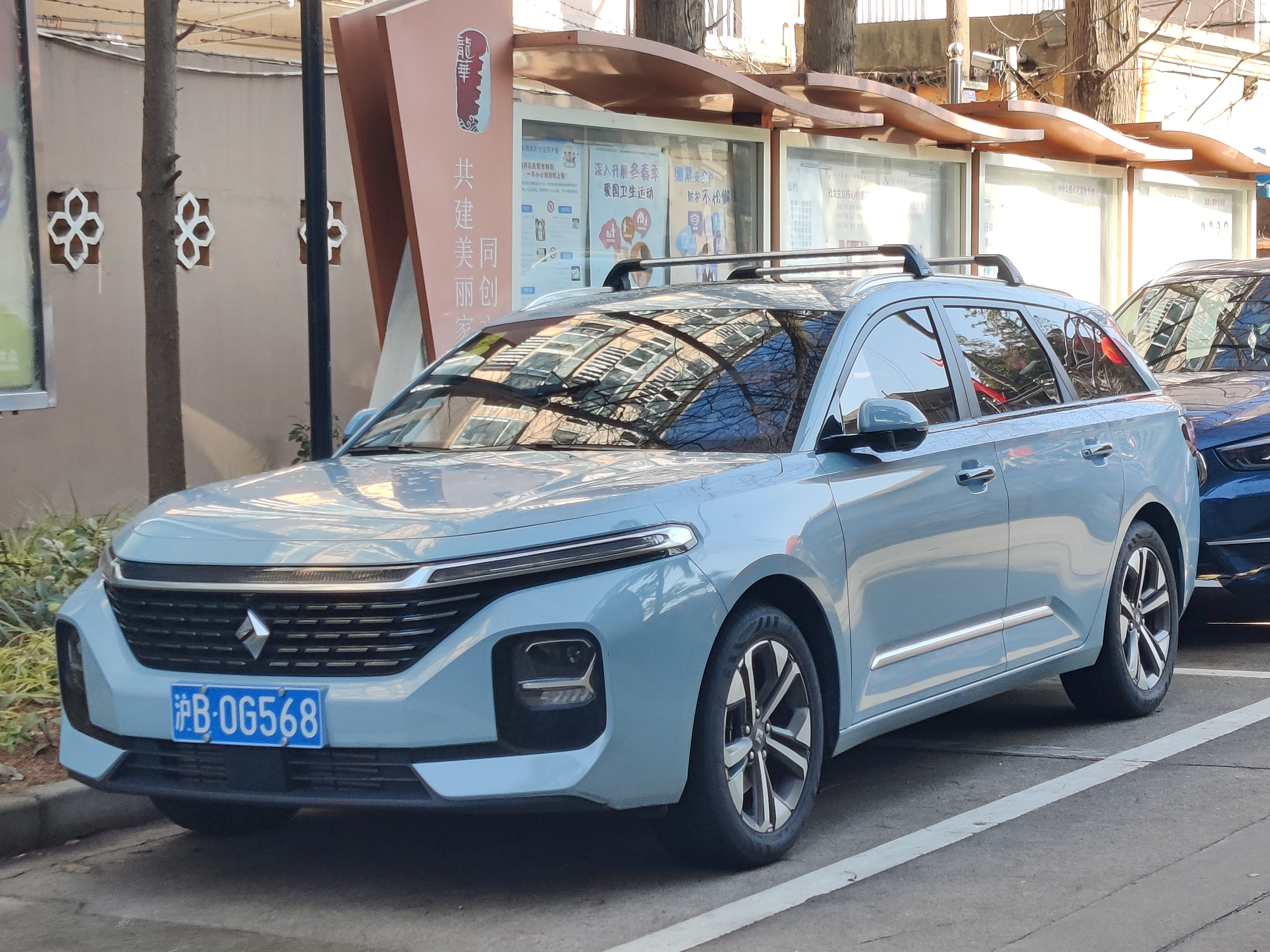
Baojun Valli front

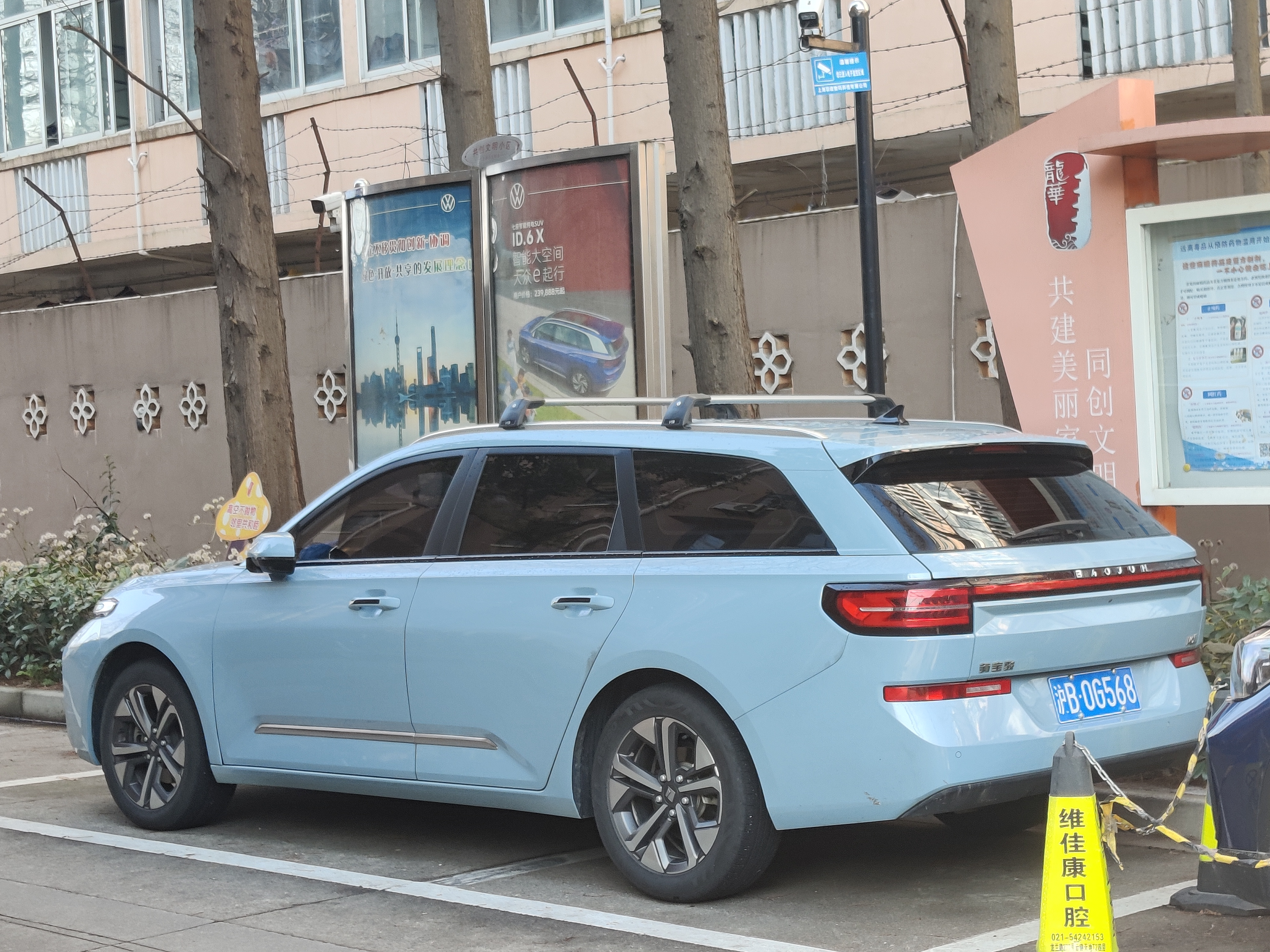
Baojun Valli rear

== Sales ==
Year	China	
Year	RC-5	Valli
2023	499	192
2024	10	—
2025	4	—
