= Wuling Hongguang Plus =

Compact MPV

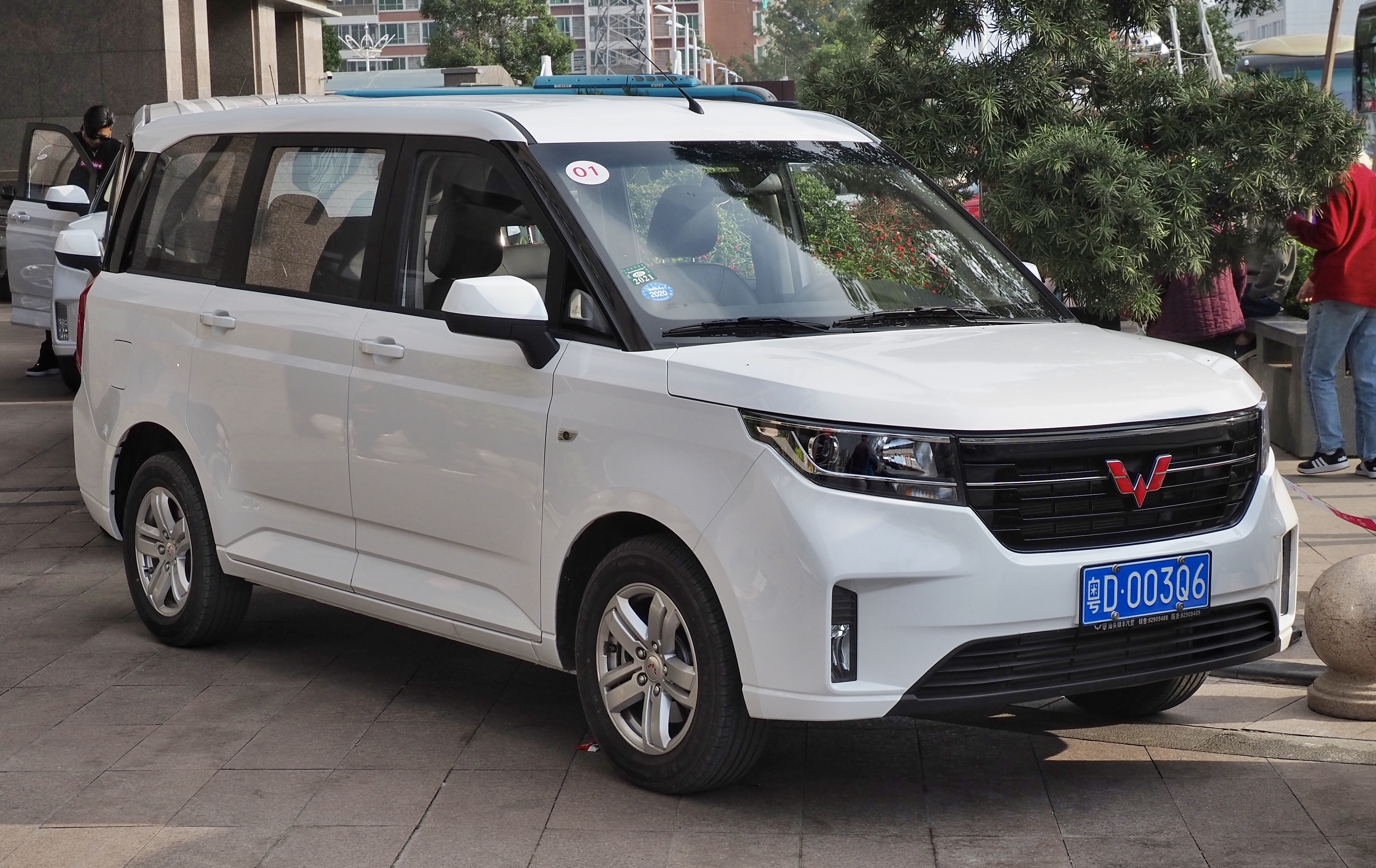
- Wuling Hongguang Plus (China)

Overview
- Manufacturer: SAIC-GM-Wuling
- Model code: CN150M
- Production: 2019–present
- Model years: 2020–present
- Assembly: Liuzhou, Guangxi, China (SAIC-GM-Wuling)

Body and chassis
- Class: Compact MPV
- Body style: 5-door wagon
- Layout: Longitudinal front-engine, rear-wheel drive
- Platform: CN150 modular platform

Powertrain
- Engine: 1.5 L LJ0 I4 (turbo petrol)
- Transmission: 6-speed manual

Dimensions
- Wheelbase: 2,800 mm (110.2 in)
- Length: 4,720 mm (185.8 in)
- Width: 1,840 mm (72.4 in)
- Height: 1,810 mm (71.3 in)
- Curb weight: 1,345–1,435 kg (2,965–3,164 lb)

Wuling Hongguang Plus is a compact Multi-Purpose Vehicle (MPV) produced since September 2019 by SAIC-GM-Wuling.

== Overview ==
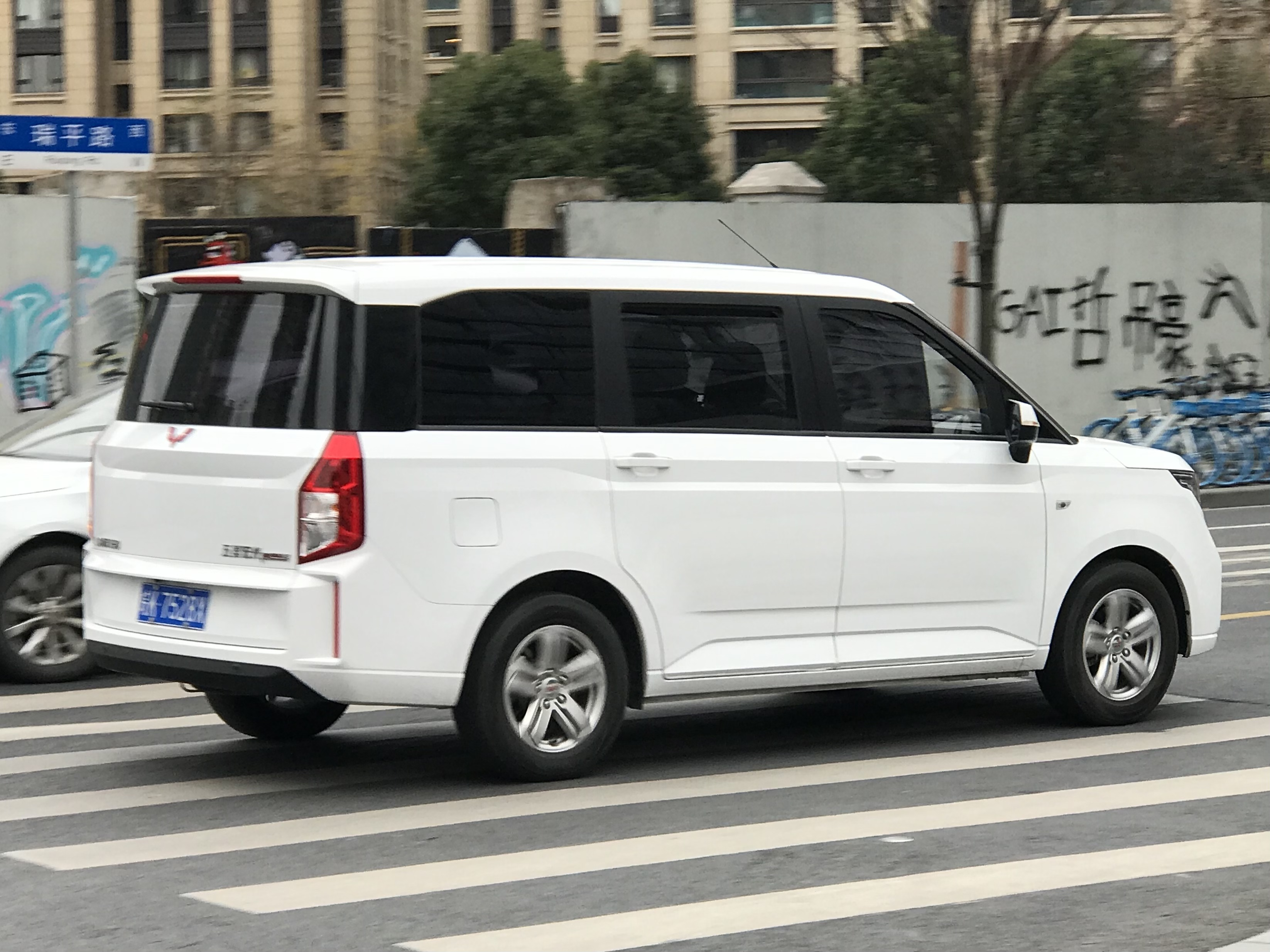
Wuling Hongguang Plus rear

Despite the Wuling Wuling Hongguang name, the Wuling Hongguang Plus is positioned to be more upmarket and was based on the new CN150 modular platform and was given a different styling featuring a new exterior and interior.

The Wuling Hongguang Plus also gains a new 1.5 litre turbocharged engine and a brand new 6 speed manual gearbox.

== Sales ==
Year	China
2023	9,758
2024	8,957
2025	5,625
