= Wuling Asta =

Compact crossover SUV

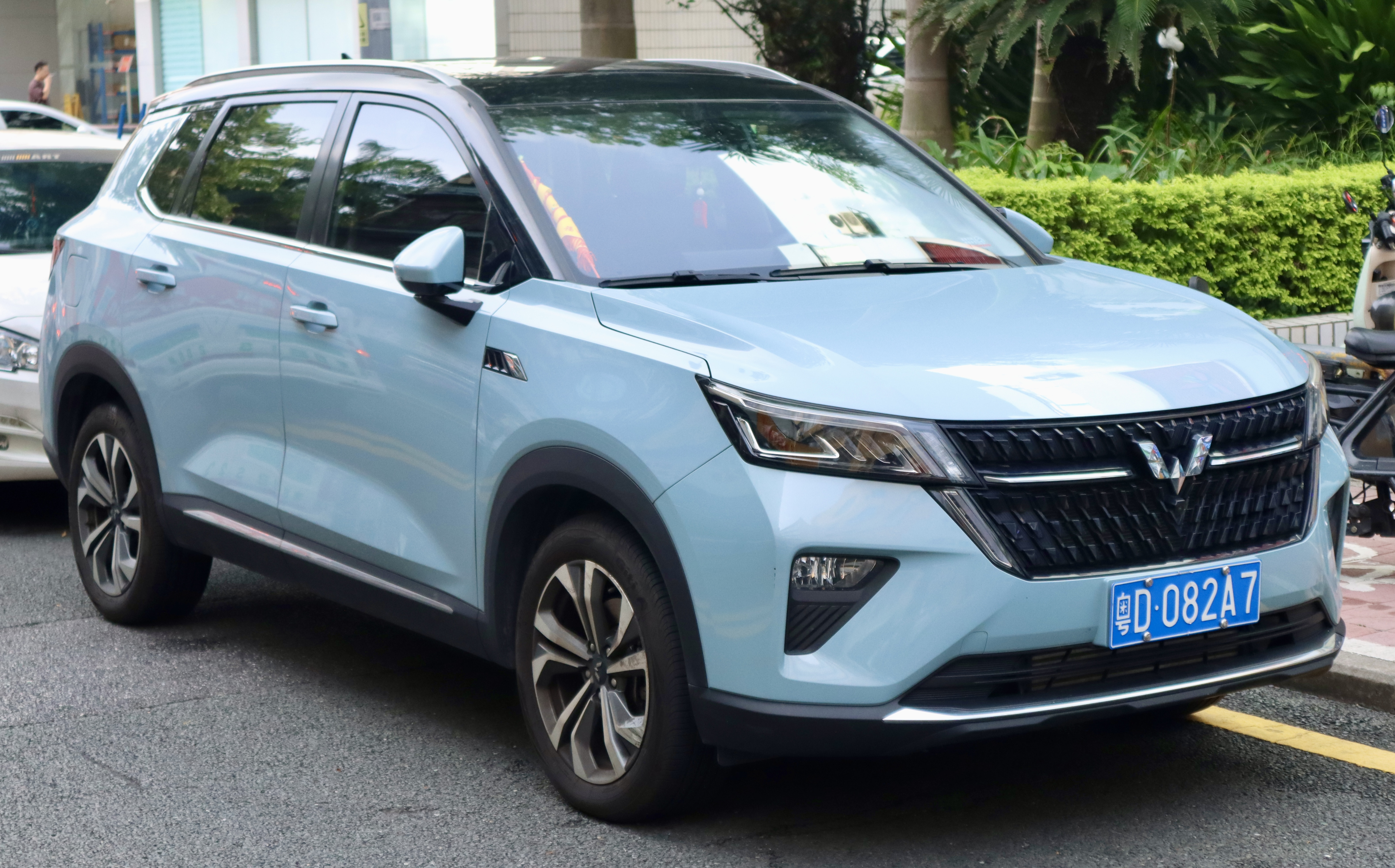

Overview
- Manufacturer: SAIC-GM-Wuling
- Model code: 730S
- Also called: Wuling Xingchen
- Production: 2021–present
- Assembly: China: Liuzhou, Guangxi

Body and chassis
- Class: Compact crossover SUV
- Body style: 5-door SUV
- Layout: Front-engine, front-wheel-drive
- Related: Baojun 530; Wuling Jiachen

Powertrain
- Engine: Petrol: 1.5 L LJO turbo I4; Petrol hybrid: 2.0 L LJM20A I4
- Power output: 108 kW (145 hp; 147 PS); 130 kW (174 hp; 177 PS) (system output, HEV)
- Transmission: 6-speed manual; CVT; Dedicated Hybrid Transmission (HEV)
- Hybrid drivetrain: Power-split hybrid
- Battery: 1.8 kWh lithium-ion (HEV)

Dimensions
- Wheelbase: 2,750 mm (108.3 in)
- Length: 4,594 mm (180.9 in)
- Width: 1,820 mm (71.7 in)
- Height: 1,740 mm (68.5 in)
- Curb weight: 1,550–1,615 mm (61.0–63.6 in) (HEV)

The Wuling Asta (Chinese: 五菱星辰; pinyin: Wǔlíng Xīngchén) is a compact crossover SUV produced by SAIC-GM-Wuling through the Wuling brand since 2021.

== Overview ==
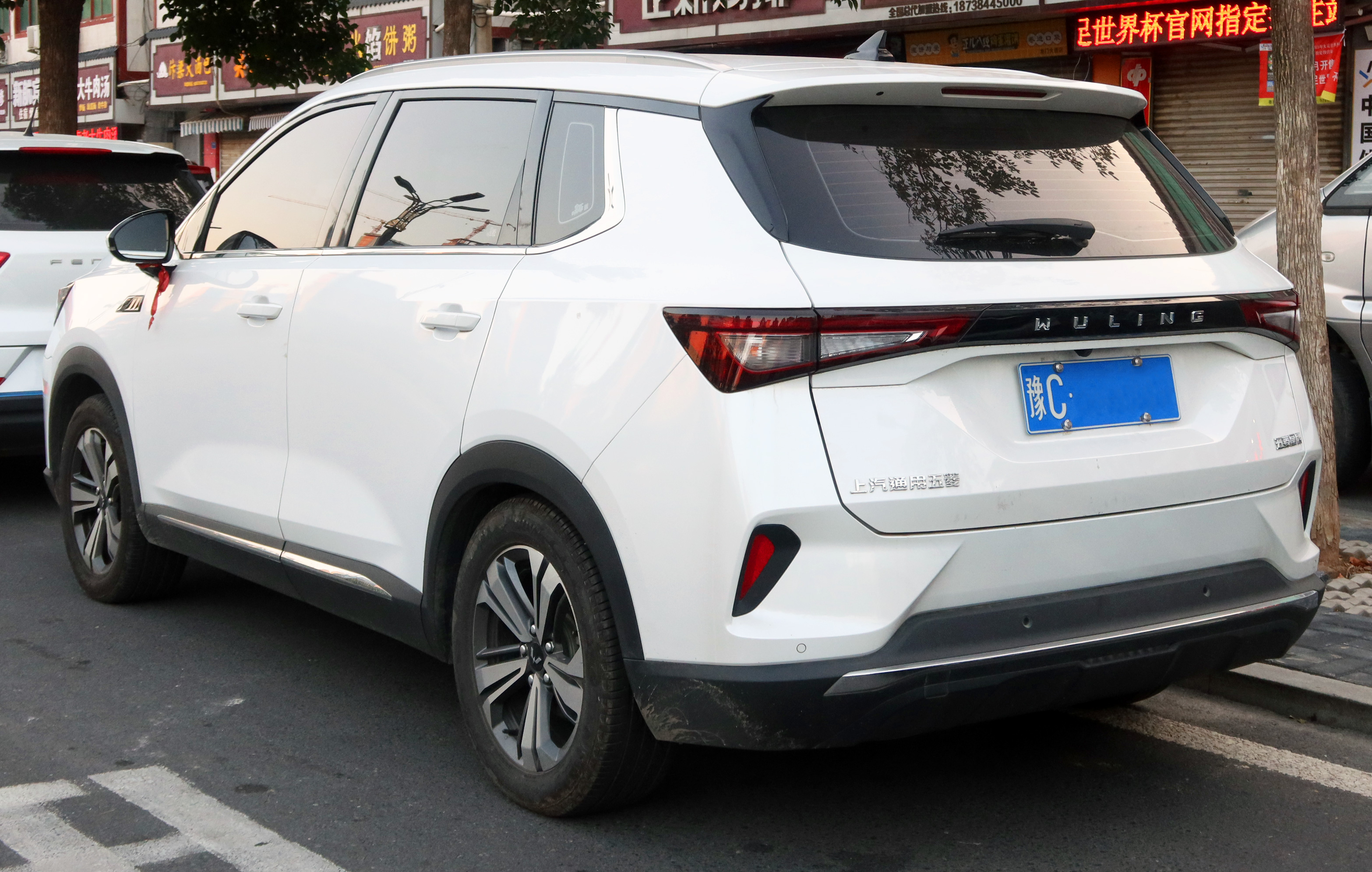
Rear view

The Asta was released on the April 2021 Auto Shanghai as part of Wuling's model offensive among regular passenger cars. It is built on the same platform as the Baojun 530.

The design of Asta follows the style of the Victory minivan, with a trapezoidal grille with a wing motif, and boomerang-shaped LED lighting. In addition, like the Victory, the Asta is equipped with a silver corporate logo for the global model range.

The Asta is powered by a turbocharged 1.5-litre LJO four-cylinder engine producing 108 kW (145 hp; 147 PS). The engine is mated to either a six-speed manual or a continuously variable transmission with eight pre-programmed gear ratios.

The Asta is the second model designed for global markets, after the Victory. Firstly, its sale began on the domestic Chinese market, with plans to start sales in export countries in 2022.

== Wuling Asta HEV ==
The Asta HEV was released in August 2022. It uses a hybrid system adopting the "P1+P3 dual motor series parallel architecture" consisting of a 2.0-litre Atkinson cycle petrol engine rated at 100 kW (136 PS; 134 hp) paired with a Dedicated Hybrid Transmission (DHT), producing a total output of 130 kW (177 PS; 174 hp) and 320 N⋅m (32.6 kg⋅m; 236 lb⋅ft) of torque. It has a claimed 0–60 km/h (37 mph) figure of 3.2 seconds, 0–100 km/h (62 mph) in 7.8 seconds, a driving range of 1,100 kilometres (680 mi), and a fuel consumption of 4.6 L/100 km (21.7 km/L; 61.4 mpg_{‑imp}; 51.1 mpg_{‑US}) in city driving.

== Sales ==
Year	China
2024	20,192
2025	2,748
