= Wuling Jiachen =

Minivan

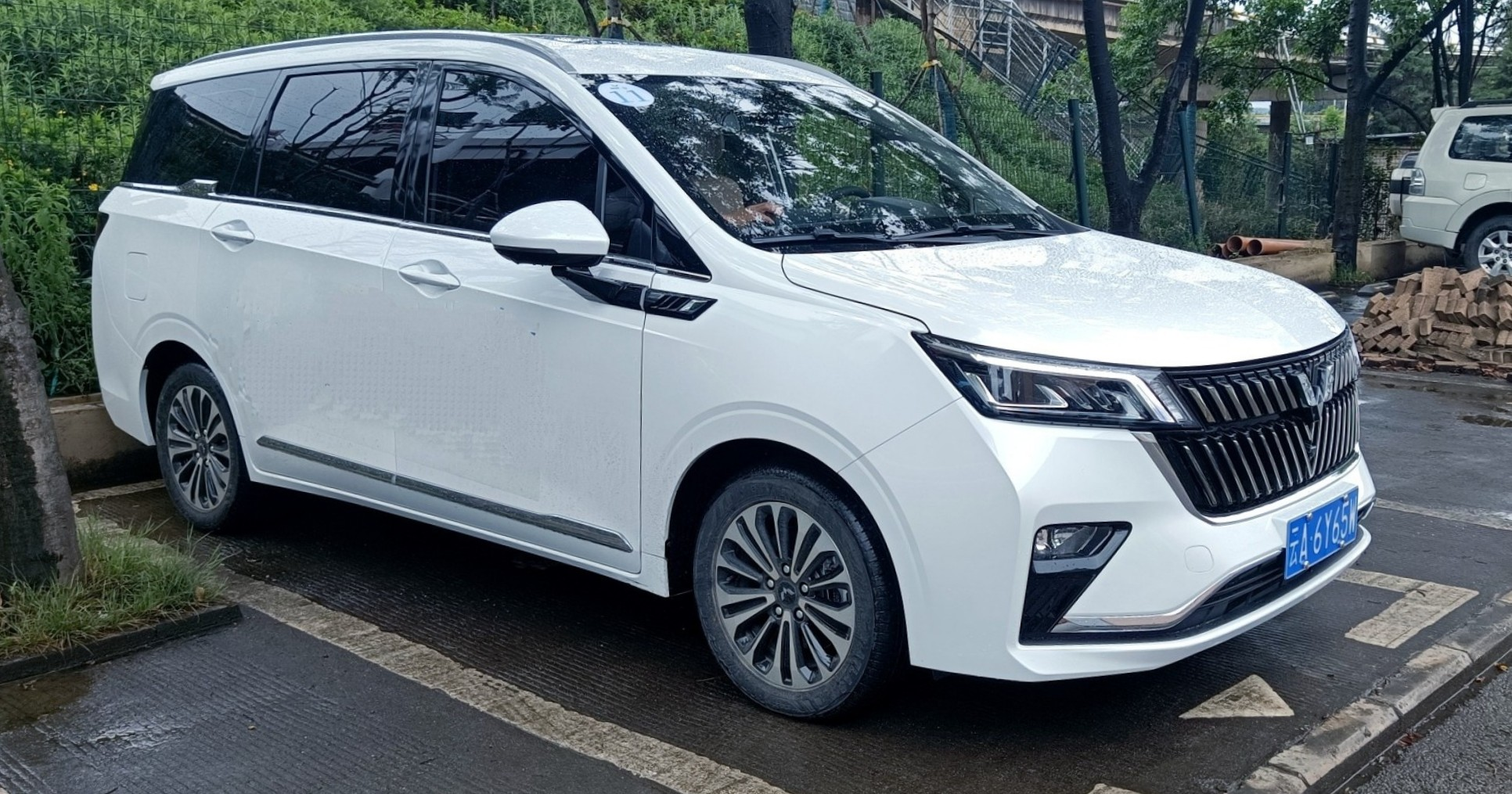

Overview
- Manufacturer: SAIC-GM-Wuling
- Model code: 730M
- Production: 2022–present
- Assembly: China: Liuzhou, Guangxi

Body and chassis
- Class: Minivan
- Body style: 5-door wagon
- Layout: Front-engine, front-wheel-drive
- Related: Wuling Asta

Powertrain
- Engine: Petrol: 1.5 L L2B I4; 1.5 L LJO turbo I4
- Power output: 73 kW (98 hp; 99 PS) (L2B); 108 kW (145 hp; 147 PS) (LJO)
- Transmission: 6-speed manual; CVT (turbo models)

Dimensions
- Wheelbase: 2,760 mm (108.7 in)
- Length: 4,785 mm (188.4 in)
- Width: 1,820 mm (71.7 in)
- Height: 1,760 mm (69.3 in)
- Kerb weight: 1,410–1,530 kg (3,109–3,373 lb)

Chronology
- Predecessor: Baojun 730
- Successor: Wuling Starlight 730

The Wuling Jiachen (Chinese: 五菱佳辰) is a minivan produced by SAIC-GM-Wuling through the Wuling brand.

== Overview ==
Positioned below the mid-sized Victory, the Jiachen was launched at the 2022 Auto China and developed specifically for the Chinese market.

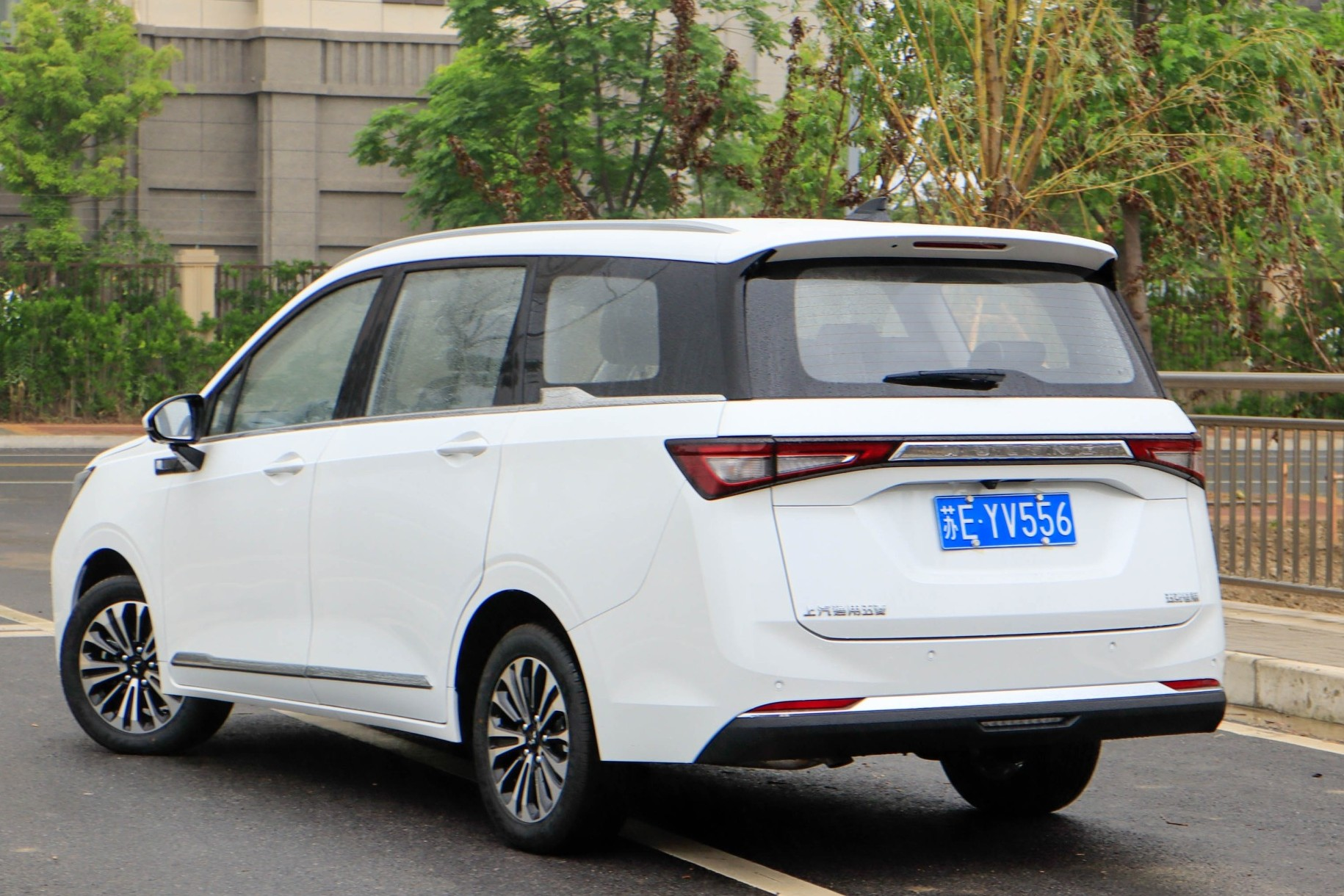
Rear view

== Powertrain ==
The Wuling Jiachen is equipped with a 1.5-liter turbocharged engine with a maximum power output of 147hp and a peak torque of 250Nm, mated with an 8-speed CVT gearbox. The engine was sourced from GM and produced in China. The fuel efficiency is 7.2 liters/100 km.

== Interior ==
The seating of the Wuling Jiachen adopts three rows in a 2+2+3 layout. The distance between each row is 80mm and the latter two rows of seats have 800mm of leg space. The rear seat height is 322mm with the longitudinal space above the seat cushion at 952mm and the shoulder space is 1382mm.

== Sales ==
Year	China
2024	18,603
2025	15,227
