= Baojun 560 =

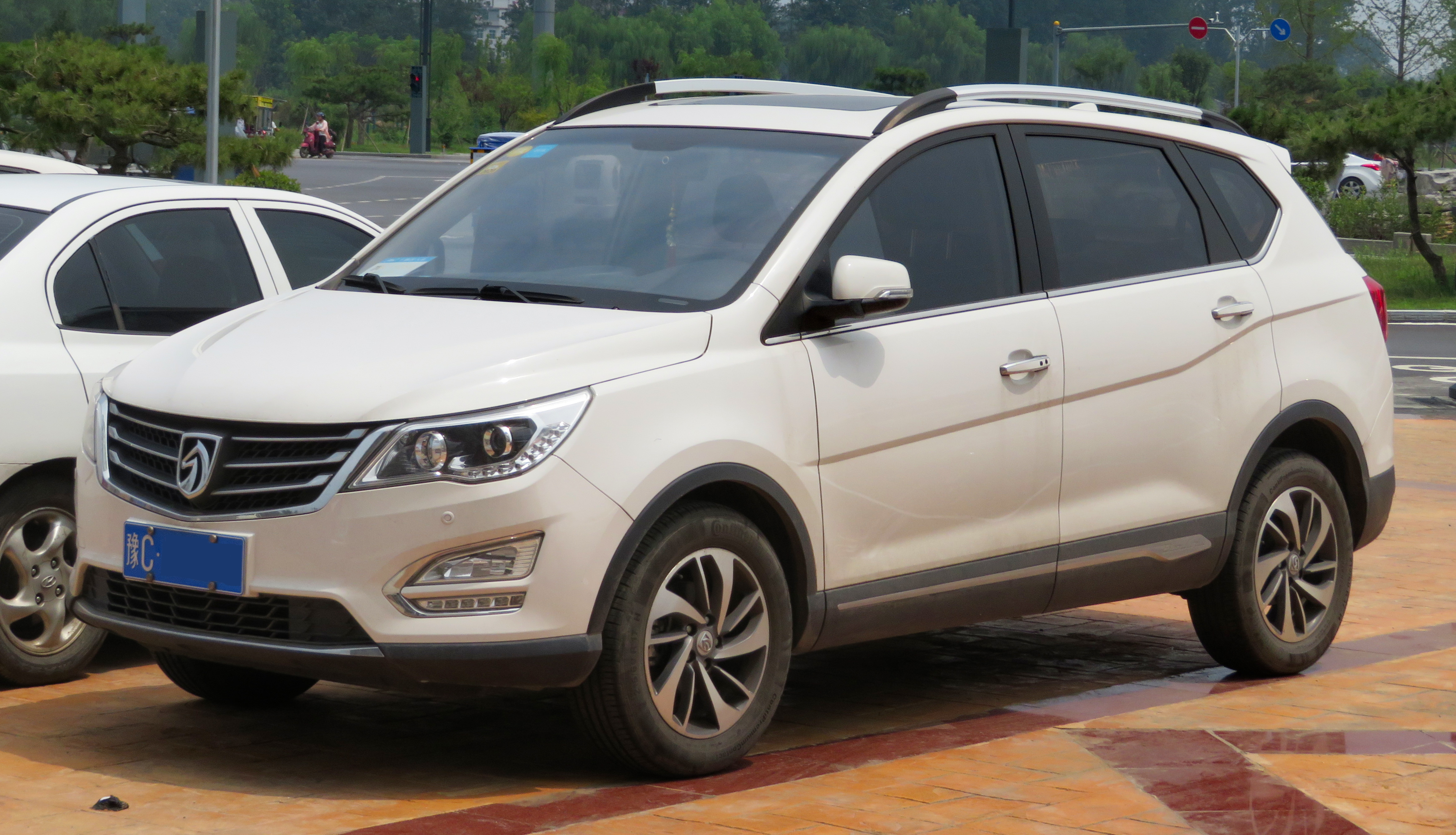

Overview
- Manufacturer: SAIC-GM-Wuling
- Production: 2015–2018
- Assembly: China: Liuzhou, Guangxi

Body and chassis
- Class: Compact crossover SUV
- Body style: 5-door SUV
- Layout: Front-engine, front-wheel-drive

Powertrain
- Engine: 1.5 L LL5 I4 (turbo petrol); 1.8 L LJ479QNE2 I4 (petrol)
- Transmission: 5-speed manual; 6-speed manual; 5-speed semi-automatic; 6-speed dual-clutch

Dimensions
- Wheelbase: 2,750 mm (108.3 in)
- Length: 4,620 mm (181.9 in)
- Width: 1,810 mm (71.3 in)
- Height: 1,750 mm (68.9 in)
- Curb weight: 1,545 kg (3,406 lb)

Chronology
- Successor: Baojun 530

The Baojun 560 is a compact crossover SUV produced by SAIC-GM-Wuling through the Baojun brand.

== Overview ==
The Baojun 560 was powered by a 1.8 liter inline-four petrol engine code named LJ479QNE2 mated to a 5-speed manual transmission, a 6-speed manual transmission, or a 5-speed semi-automatic transmission. A 1.5 liter Daewoo S-TEC inline-four turbo petrol engine was added in 2017 mated to a 6-speed dual-clutch transmission producing 150 hp (110 kW).

The Baojun 560 was launched on the Chinese market in July 2015. Price ranges from 80,000 to 100,000 yuan, and was phased out by 2018 when the Baojun 530 replaced the 560 model.

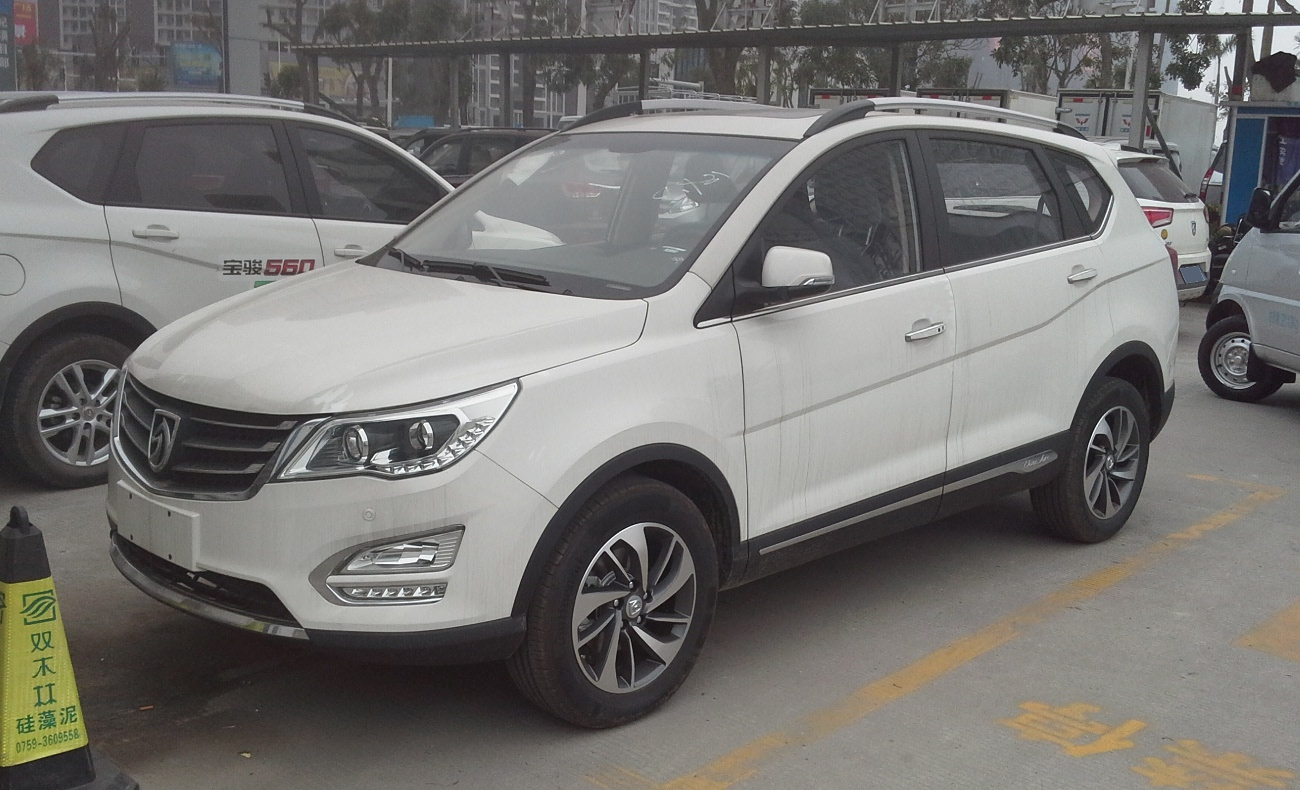
Baojun 560 high-trim front.

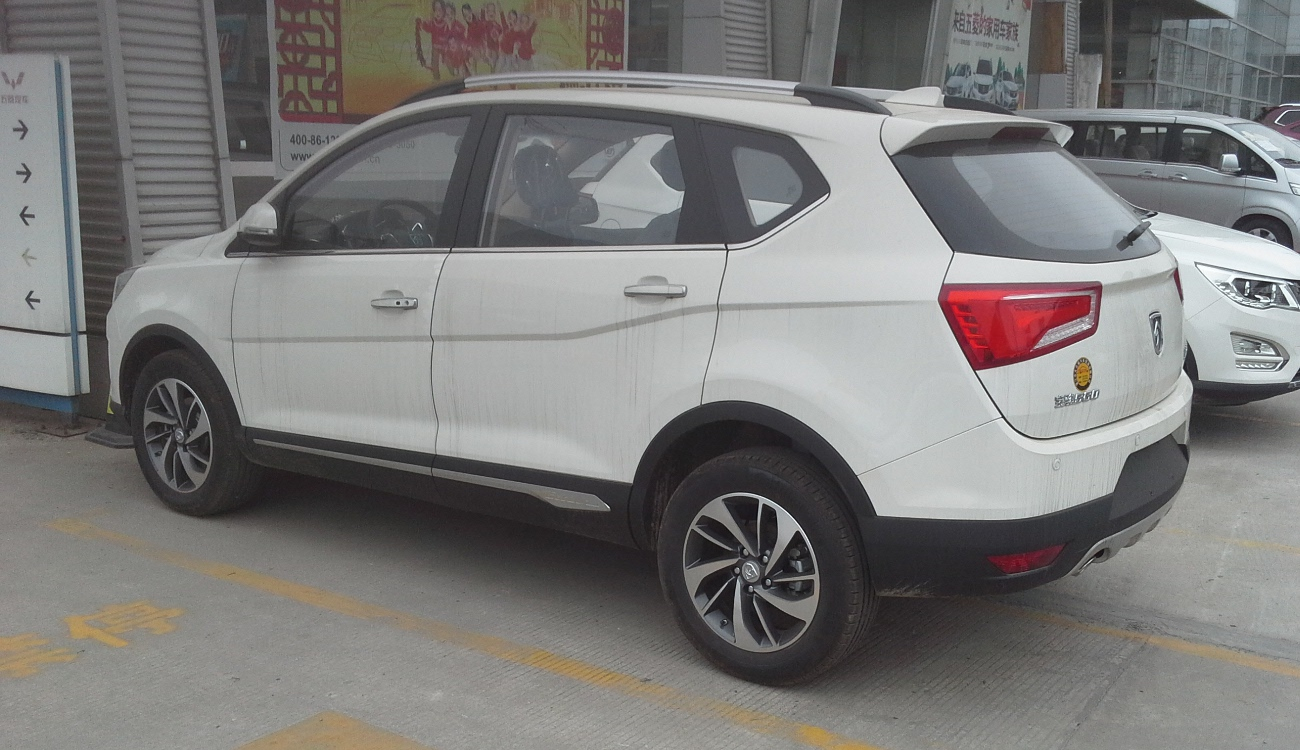
Baojun 560 high-trim rear.

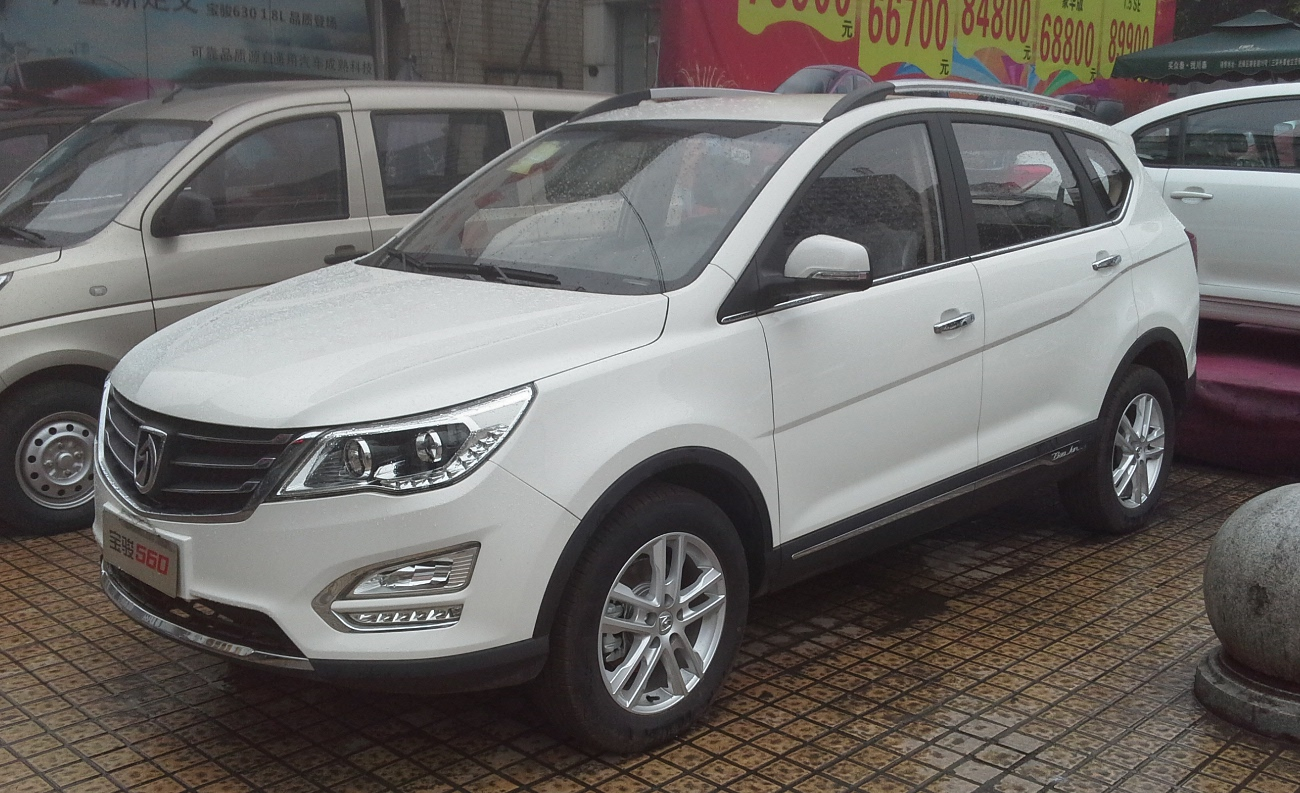
Baojun 560 low-trim front.

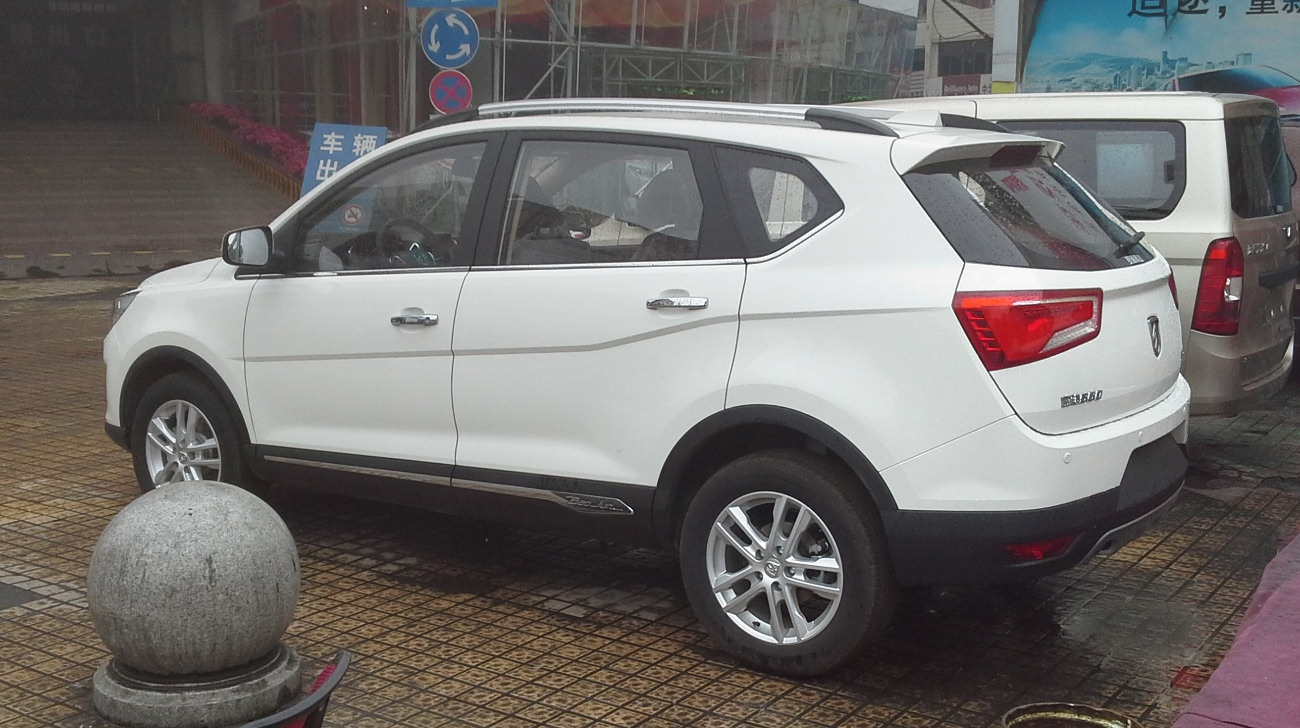
Baojun 560 low-trim rear.
