= Baojun 530 =

Chinese compact crossover SUV

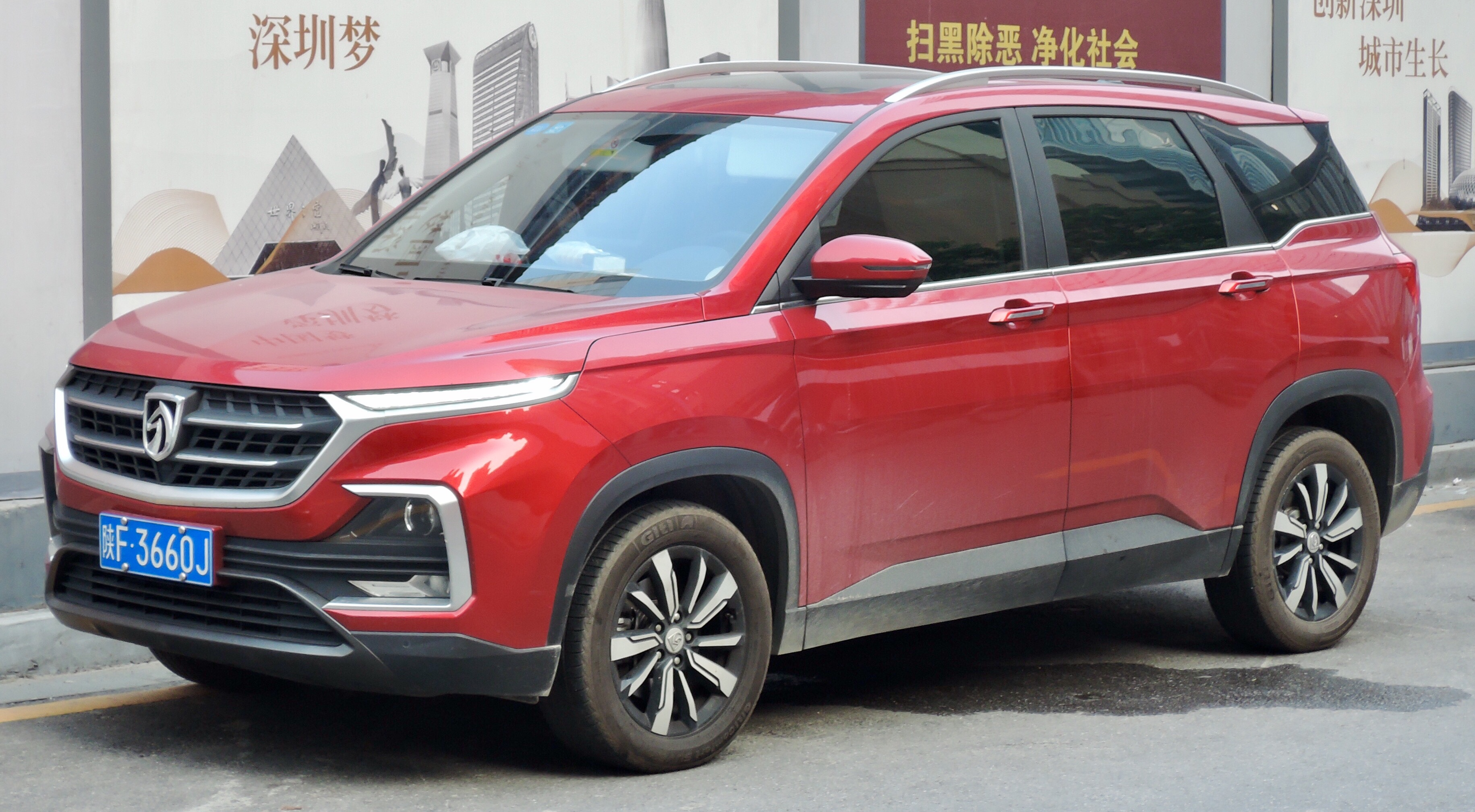

Overview
- Manufacturer: SAIC-GM-Wuling
- Model code: CN202S
- Also called: Chevrolet Captiva; MG Hector (India); Wuling Almaz (Indonesia and Brunei)
- Production: January 2018 – present
- Assembly: China: Chongqing; Indonesia: Cikarang, West Java (SGMW Indonesia); India: Halol, Gujarat (JSW MG Motor India)

Body and chassis
- Class: Compact crossover SUV
- Body style: 5-door SUV
- Layout: Front-engine, front-wheel-drive
- Related: Baojun 360; Baojun 560; Baojun 730; Baojun RM-5; Wuling Xingchen

Powertrain
- Engine: Petrol: 1.5 L LJO turbo I4; 1.8 L LJ4 I4; Petrol hybrid: 2.0 L LJM20A I4 (Almaz Hybrid); Diesel: 2.0 L Multijet turbo I4 (Hector)
- Electric motor: Permanent magnet synchronous (Almaz Hybrid)
- Power output: 104.5–110 kW (140–148 hp; 142–150 PS) (1.5 L petrol); 101 kW (135 hp; 137 PS) (1.8 L petrol); 125 kW (168 hp; 170 PS) (2.0 L diesel); 92 kW (123 hp; 125 PS) (2.0 L hybrid, engine); 130 kW (174 hp; 177 PS) (2.0 L hybrid, motor)
- Transmission: 6-speed manual; 5-speed automated manual; 6-speed dual-clutch; CVT; Dedicated Hybrid Transmission (Almaz Hybrid)
- Hybrid drivetrain: Mild hybrid (Hector); Power-split hybrid (Almaz Hybrid)
- Battery: 1.8 kWh NCM lithium-ion (Almaz Hybrid)

Dimensions
- Wheelbase: 2,750 mm (108.3 in)
- Length: 4,655–4,715 mm (183.3–185.6 in)
- Width: 1,835 mm (72.2 in)
- Height: 1,750–1,760 mm (68.9–69.3 in)
- Curb weight: 1,435–1,720 kg (3,164–3,792 lb)

Chronology
- Predecessor: Baojun 560; Chevrolet Captiva (first generation); Chevrolet Equinox (Mexico)
- Successor: Wuling Starlight 560 / Eksion

The Baojun 530 (Chinese: 宝骏530) is a two- or three-row compact crossover SUV produced by SAIC-GM-Wuling (SGMW) through the Baojun brand. Unveiled at the Auto Guangzhou 2017, Baojun 530 took design cues from the smaller 510 and is a successor of the 560, while the 560 remained briefly on sale as a more affordable alternative. The crossover is an example of an extensive badge engineering, as it is marketed under four different brands in several different markets.

The Baojun 530 started sale in China in February 2018. It started production in Indonesia in January 2019 as the Wuling Almaz, making Indonesia the first market outside China to receive the 530 model. In November 2018, the 530 was also introduced as the second-generation Chevrolet Captiva in Colombia. The Chevrolet-badged 530 went on sale in several South American markets since April 2019, being fully imported from China. It was launched in India as MG Hector in June 2019 as the first model released by JSW MG Motor India.

== China ==
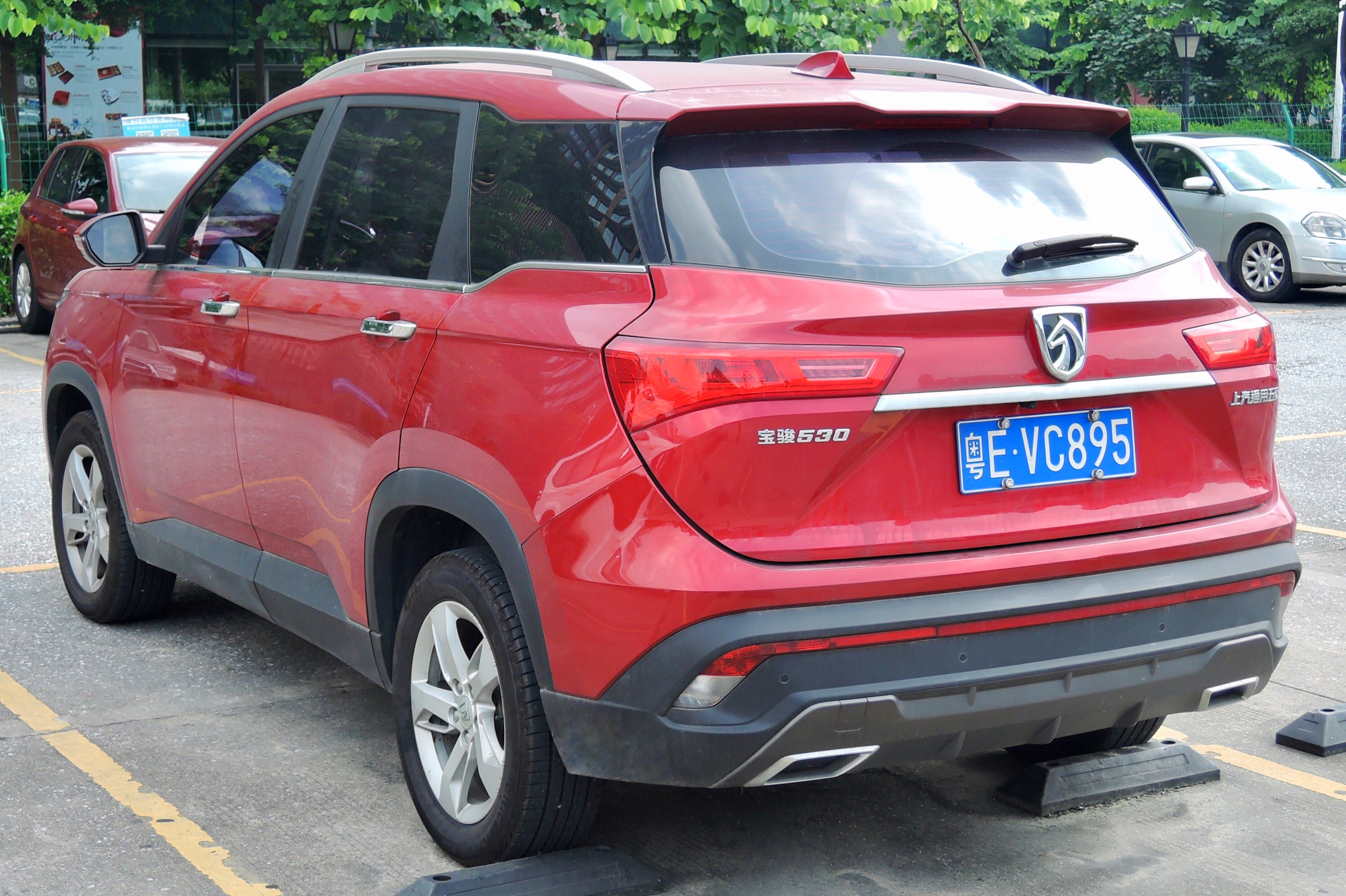
Rear view

In the Chinese domestic market, the 530 is positioned above the 510 subcompact crossover and under the later released RS-5 within Baojun's line-up.

The 530 in China is offered with a 1.5-litre turbo petrol engine with the turbocharger sourced from Honeywell, paired with either 5-speed manual and DCT, and a 1.8-litre naturally aspirated petrol engine, paired with a 5-speed AMT.

In November 2018, the 2019 model was launched with a CVT with 8-speed simulation jointly developed with Bosch, slight adjustments to the engine power and torque, and a new speedometer layout. In January 2019, the 7-seater version of the 530 was launched.

=== Facelift ===
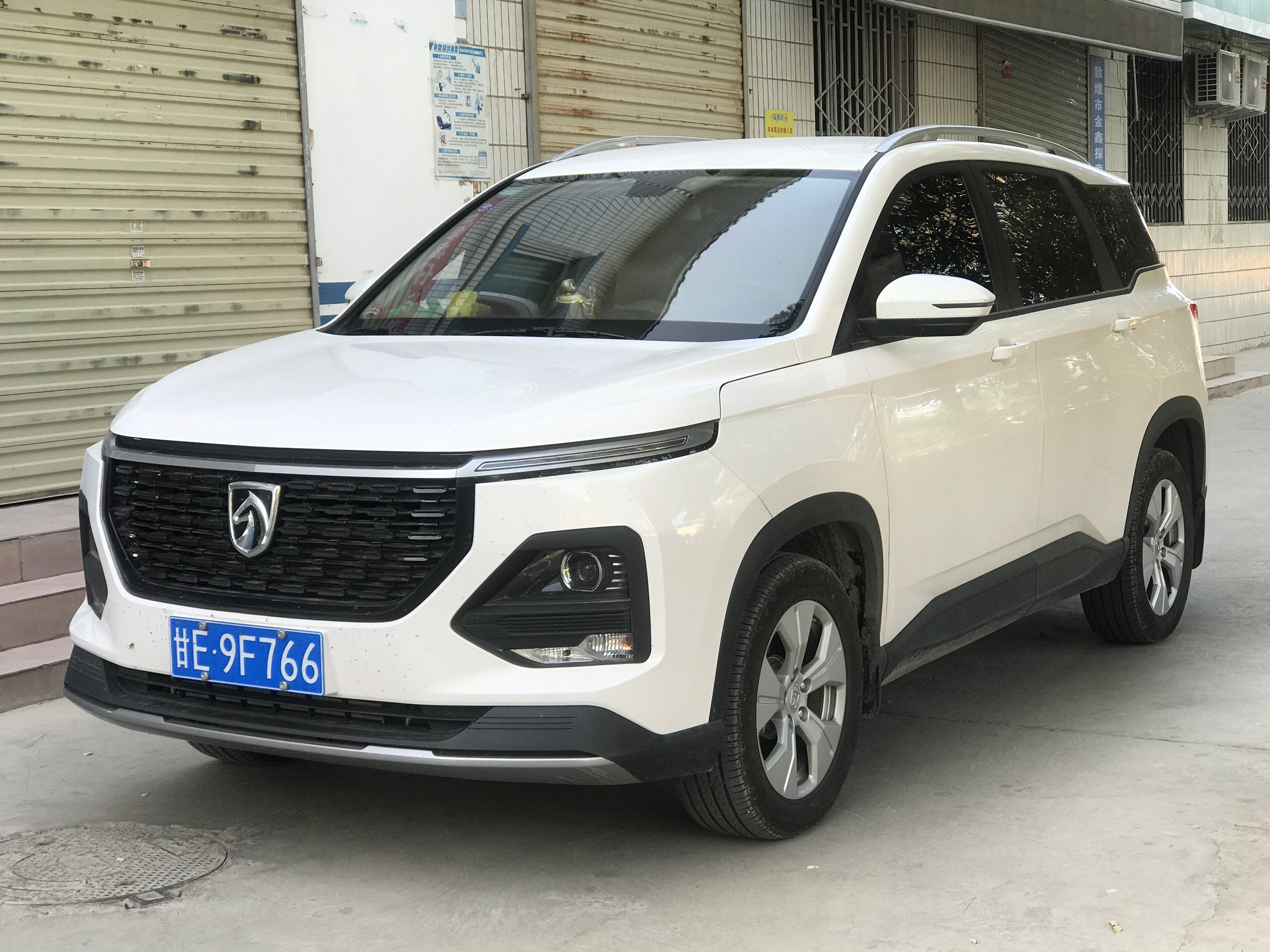
2019 facelift

The facelifted version of the 530 was released on 20 September 2019, featuring the new Baojun design language. It also received a 10.4-inch head unit with an integrated air conditioning control, a full LCD speedometer and a 6-seater configuration as an option.

The 530 was discontinued in the Chinese market after the 2021 model year.

== Overseas markets ==
=== Wuling Almaz ===
The 530 is marketed in Indonesia under the Wuling brand with the name Wuling Almaz, which was revealed on 23 January 2019 and launched to the market on 27 February 2019. The "Almaz" name means "diamond" in Arabic. A left-hand-drive prototype was previously displayed at the 26th Gaikindo Indonesia International Auto Show in August 2018 under the Wuling SUV name as an introduction. The car is manufactured in Indonesia with 43.5 percent of the component is sourced locally. At launch, the crossover is offered in only one variant with five seats. It is powered by a 1.5-litre petrol engine with a turbocharger producing 140 hp (104 kW; 142 PS), instead of 145–147 hp (108–110 kW; 147–149 PS) in other markets. Initially, the Almaz was only offered with a Bosch-designed CVT.

The Almaz received a standard 10.4" head unit with an integrated air conditioning control, smartphone mirroring functionality dubbed as "Wuling Link" and other vehicle settings control embedded.

A 7-seater version was revealed on 11 July 2019 and launched at the 27th Gaikindo Indonesia International Auto Show alongside the introduction of voice command system named "WIND" (Wuling Indonesian Command), which only supports the Indonesian language. The Indonesian 7-seater version is equipped with AC blower on the third row seat with an independent air blower speed switch. The previous single variant was renamed to "Exclusive" and remains available as a 5-seater.

The entry-level variant of the 7-seater model, dubbed as "Smart Enjoy", was also launched at the same time. It is the only Almaz variant to be offered with a manual transmission.

The flagship variant of the 7-seater model, dubbed as "RS", was revealed on 18 March 2021 and launched on 29 March 2021. "WISE" (Wuling Interconnected Smart Ecosystem) is standard in this variant, which includes internet on vehicle and advanced driver-assistance systems. It is available in Exclusive and Pro trim levels. According to Wuling, "RS" stands for "Rising Star".

In September 2022, Wuling showcased the Almaz RS Hybrid Concept. The production version of the Almaz RS Hybrid was launched on 3 November 2022, it is powered by a 2.0-litre petrol hybrid engine used on the Wuling Asta HEV.

The facelifted Almaz was unveiled on 10 August 2023 at the 30th Gaikindo Indonesia International Auto Show, the Almaz range was narrowed down to two variants: RS Turbo and RS Hybrid.

On 5 February 2026, the model is replaced by the Wuling Eksion, which is a rebadge from Wuling Starlight 560.

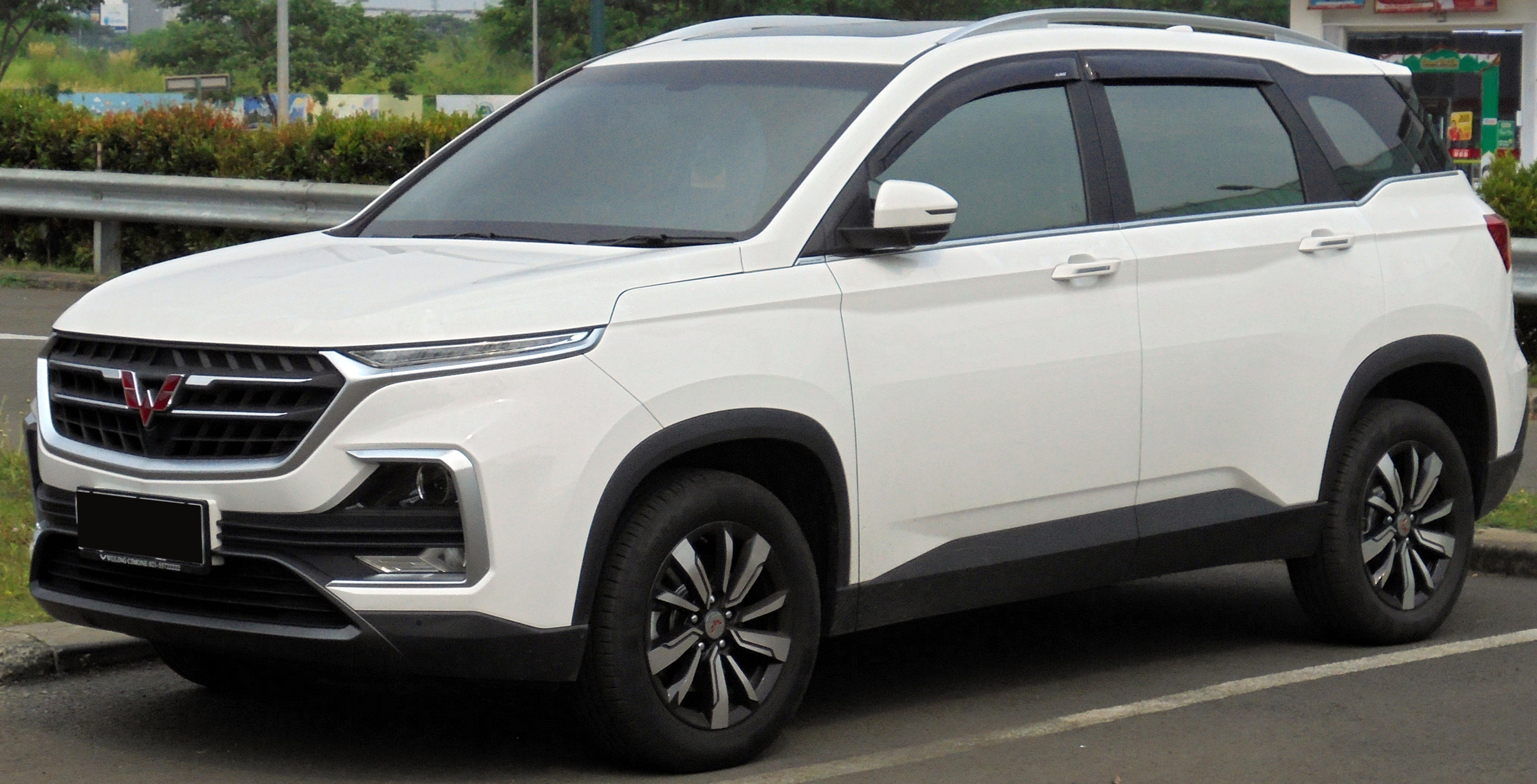
2019 Wuling Almaz (5-seater)

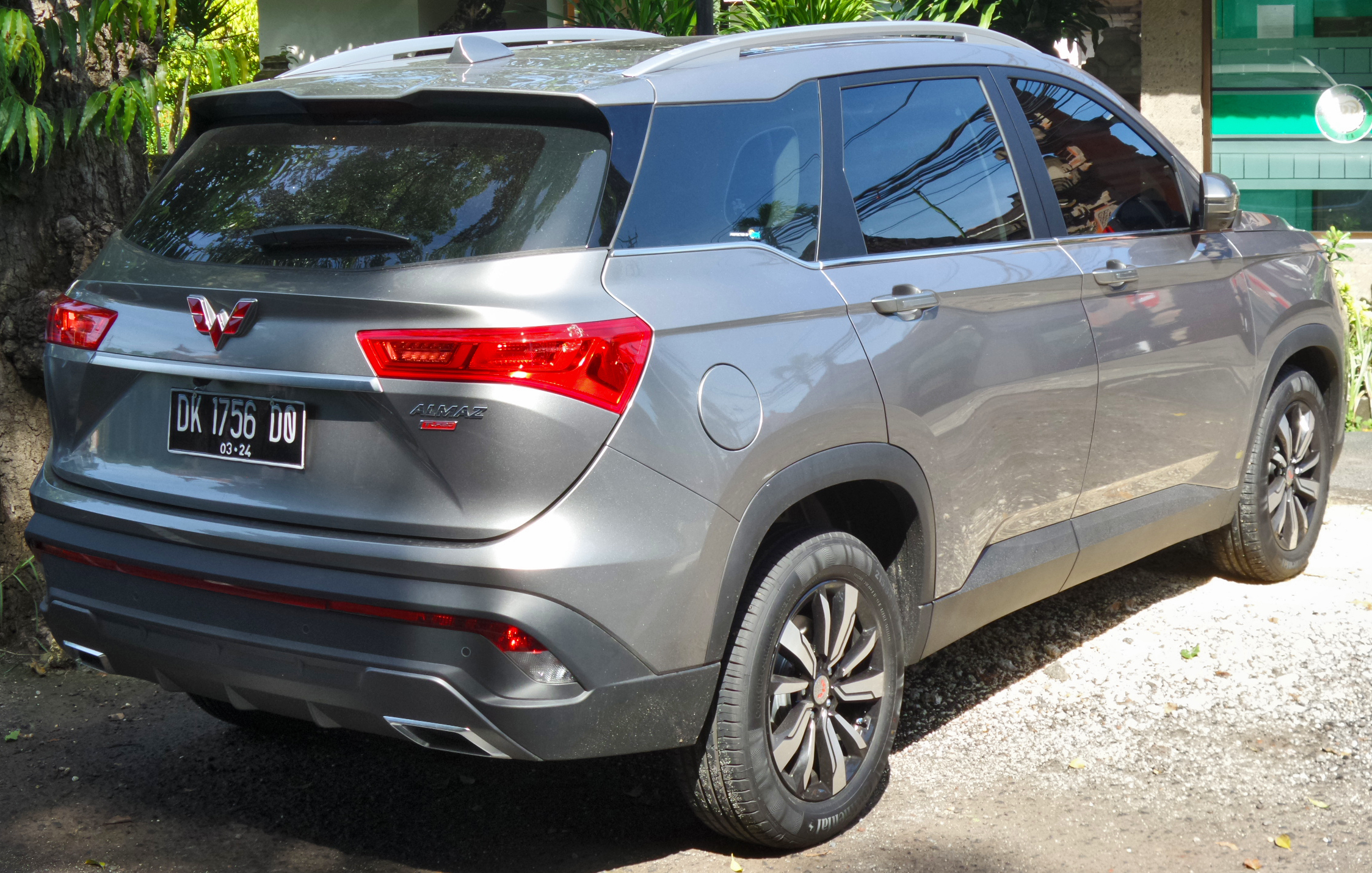
2019 Wuling Almaz (5-seater)

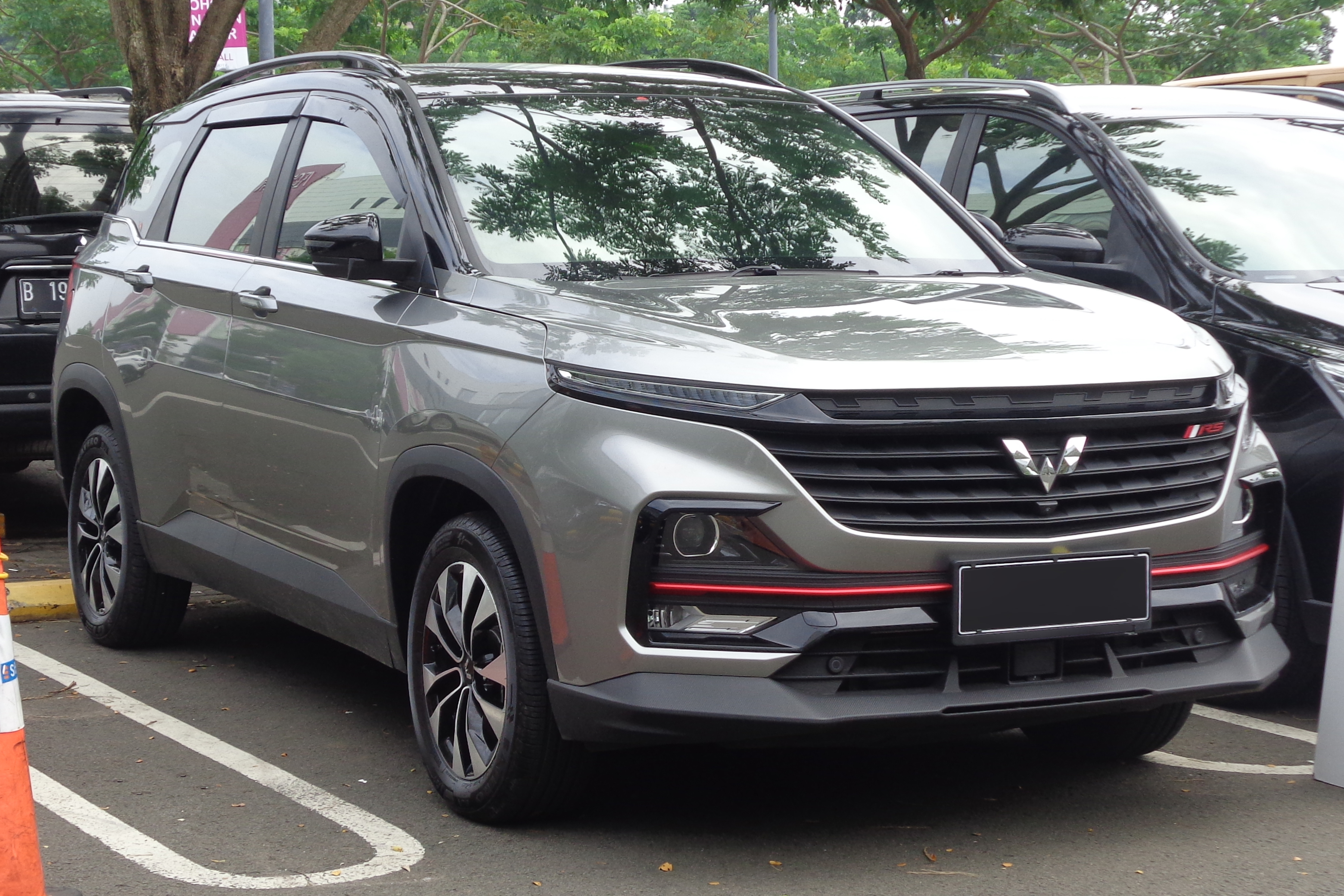
2021 Wuling Almaz RS Pro (pre-facelift)

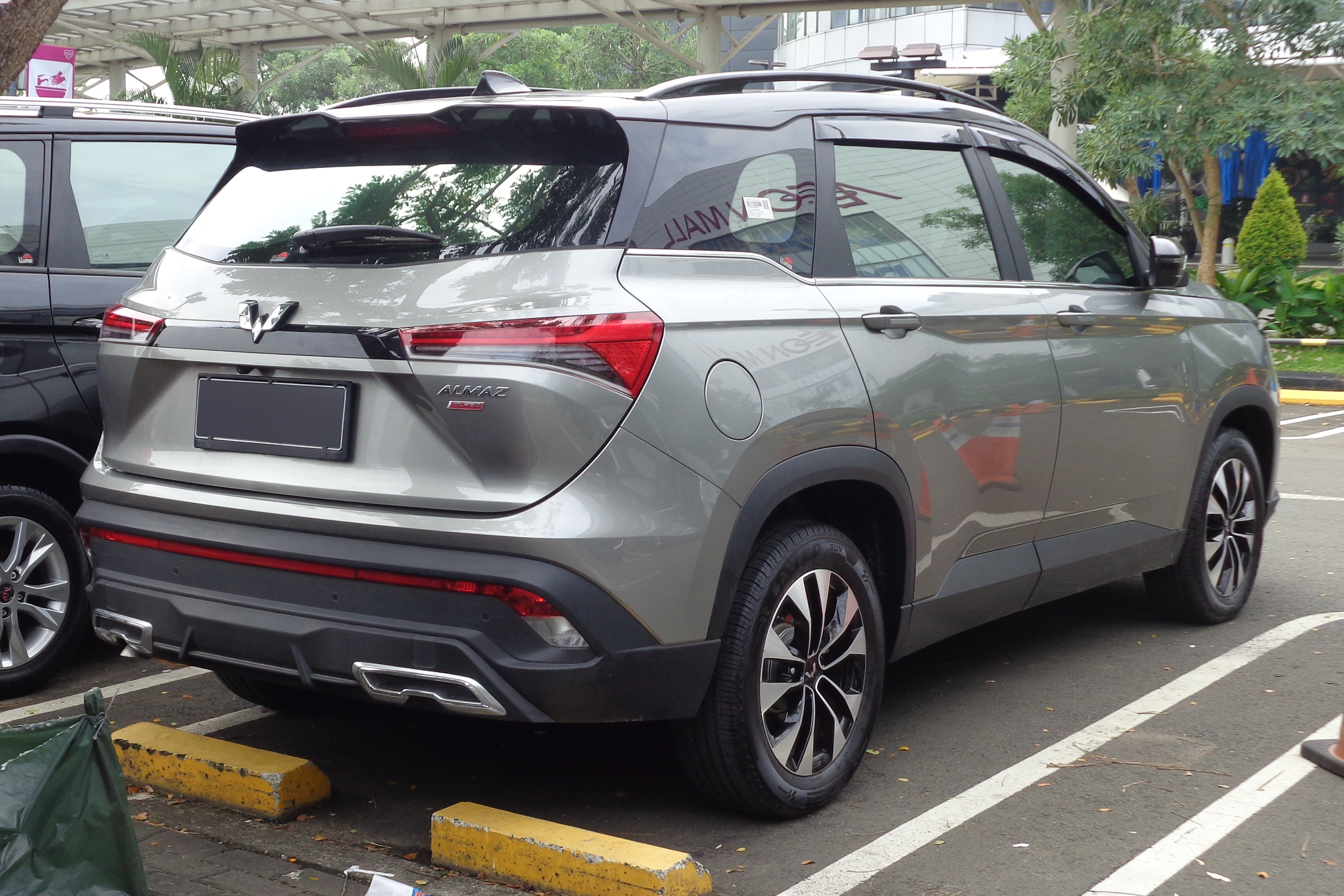
2021 Wuling Almaz RS Pro (pre-facelift)

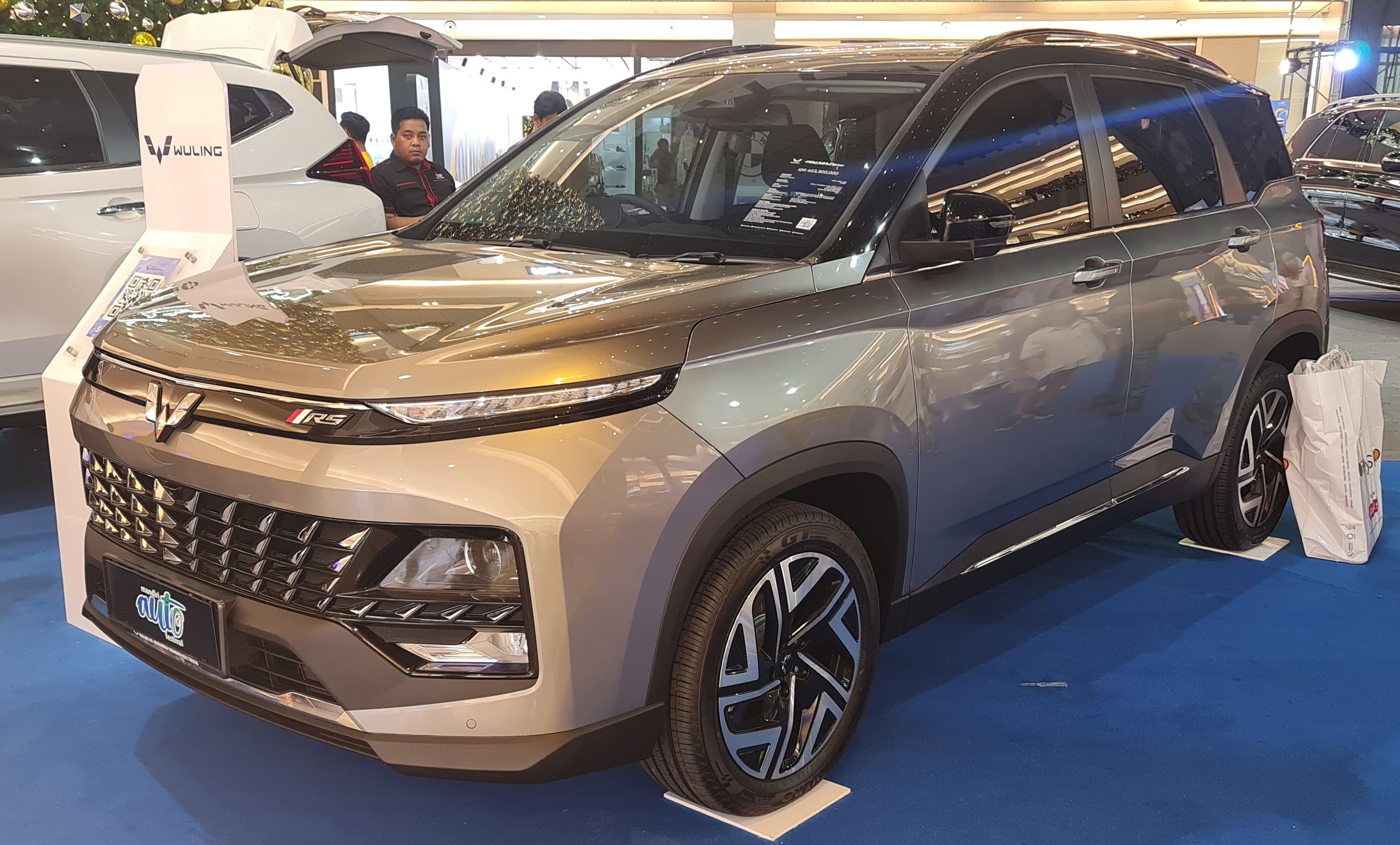
2023 Wuling Almaz RS Pro (facelift)

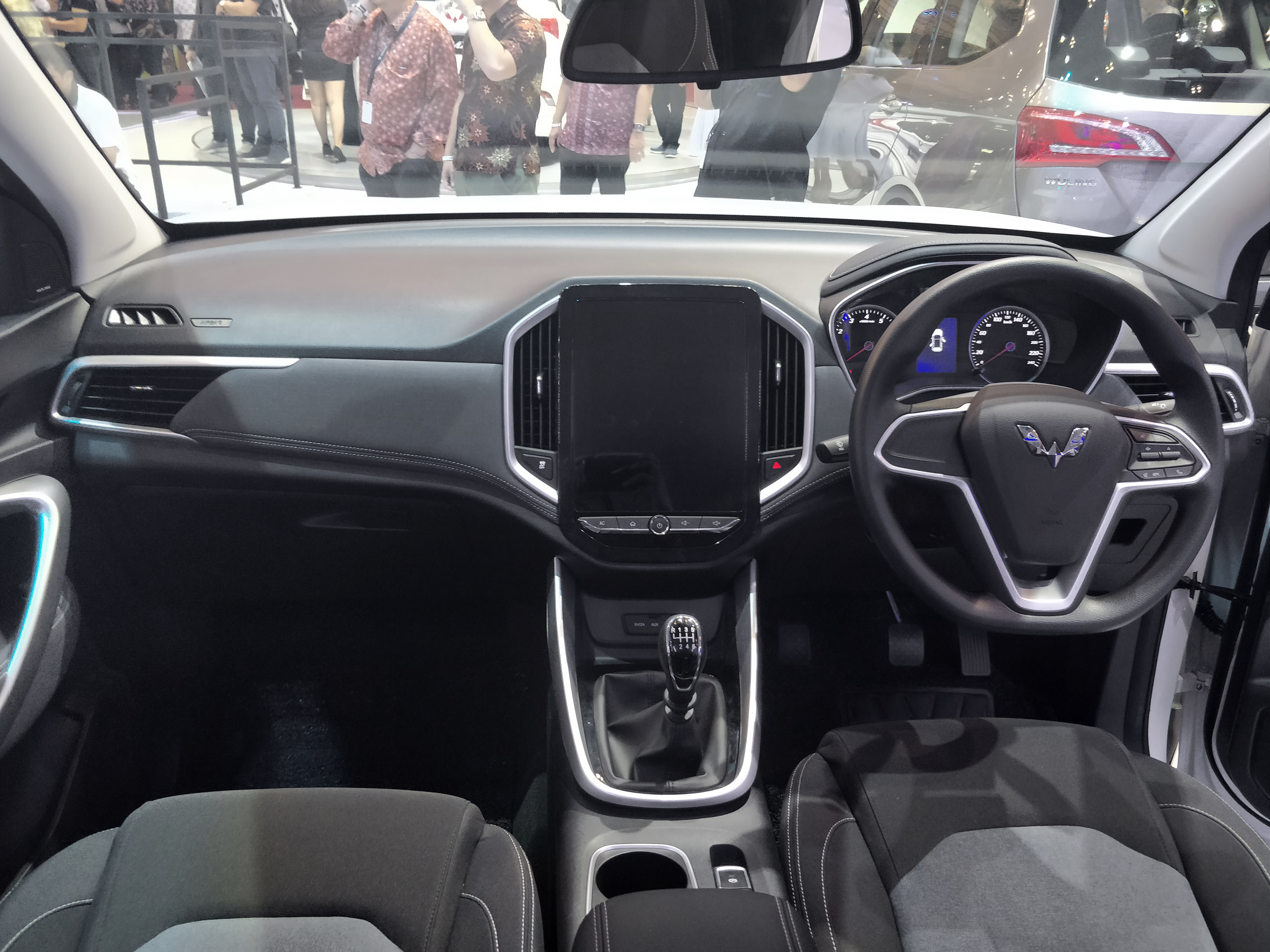
Interior

=== Chevrolet Captiva ===
The 530 was introduced as the second-generation Chevrolet Captiva in November 2018 at Salón de Automóvil de Bogotá in Colombia. It features a different front grille to match the Chevrolet logo. In April 2019, the Captiva was launched in Peru as the first launch in South America. The South American market Captiva is offered in 5-seater and 7-seater configurations, and was initially only offered with manual transmission. The Captiva is imported from China, and it slots between the Tracker/Trax and Equinox.

On 27 March 2019, GM introduced the Captiva at the Bangkok International Motor Show, Thailand. The Captiva for Thailand domestic market was imported from the SGMW facility in Cikarang, Indonesia. On September 25, 2019, SGMW Indonesia exported their first batch of cars, 20 months after its operation in Indonesia. Unlike the Captiva for the South American market, the Thai-spec Captiva is equipped with a 10.4" head unit, electronic parking brake, panoramic sunroof and a 360-degree around-view camera like the Wuling Almaz and would only be offered in CVT.

Starting in October 2019, Chevrolet Captiva was officially launched in Thailand in three trims: LS, LT and Premier. In February 2020, GM announced that it will exit from the Thailand market. As the result, the Captiva are no longer imported to the country. About 2,000 Captivas were sold out by 19 February 2020.

In May 2020, Captiva went on sale in the Middle East. It is the cheapest Chevrolet crossover available in the market, slotting below the Equinox.

Currently, the Captiva is available in Bolivia, Brunei, Colombia, Chile, Dominican Republic, Ecuador, Fiji, Peru, Uruguay, and select Middle East countries. Its launch for the Mexican market was announced on 10 November 2020 for the first quarter of 2021, using the updated styling from the 2020 Baojun 530. It went on sale in spring 2021 and it is positioned below the Equinox.

In Brunei, the Captiva was replaced by the identical Wuling Almaz in December 2020.

The facelifted Captiva was revealed in the Middle East and Mexico in August 2023, using the updated styling from the 2021 Wuling Almaz RS Pro with a different grille with a Chevrolet logo.

For the 2025 model year, in the Middle East, the Midnight Edition was added and in Mexico, the Black Edition was also added with new Blue colour and with black Chevrolet logo.

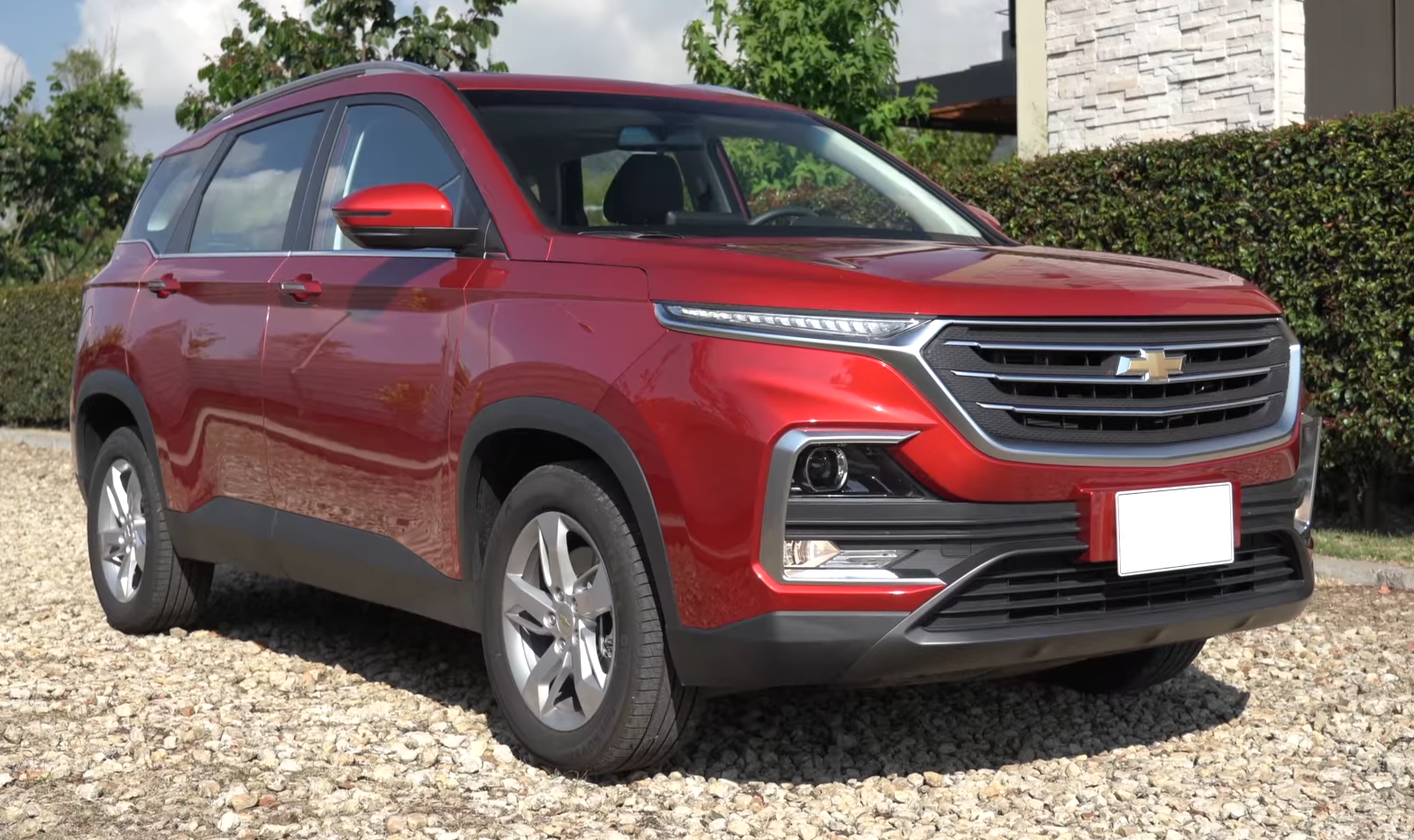
2020 Chevrolet Captiva 1.5T LT (Colombia; pre-facelift)

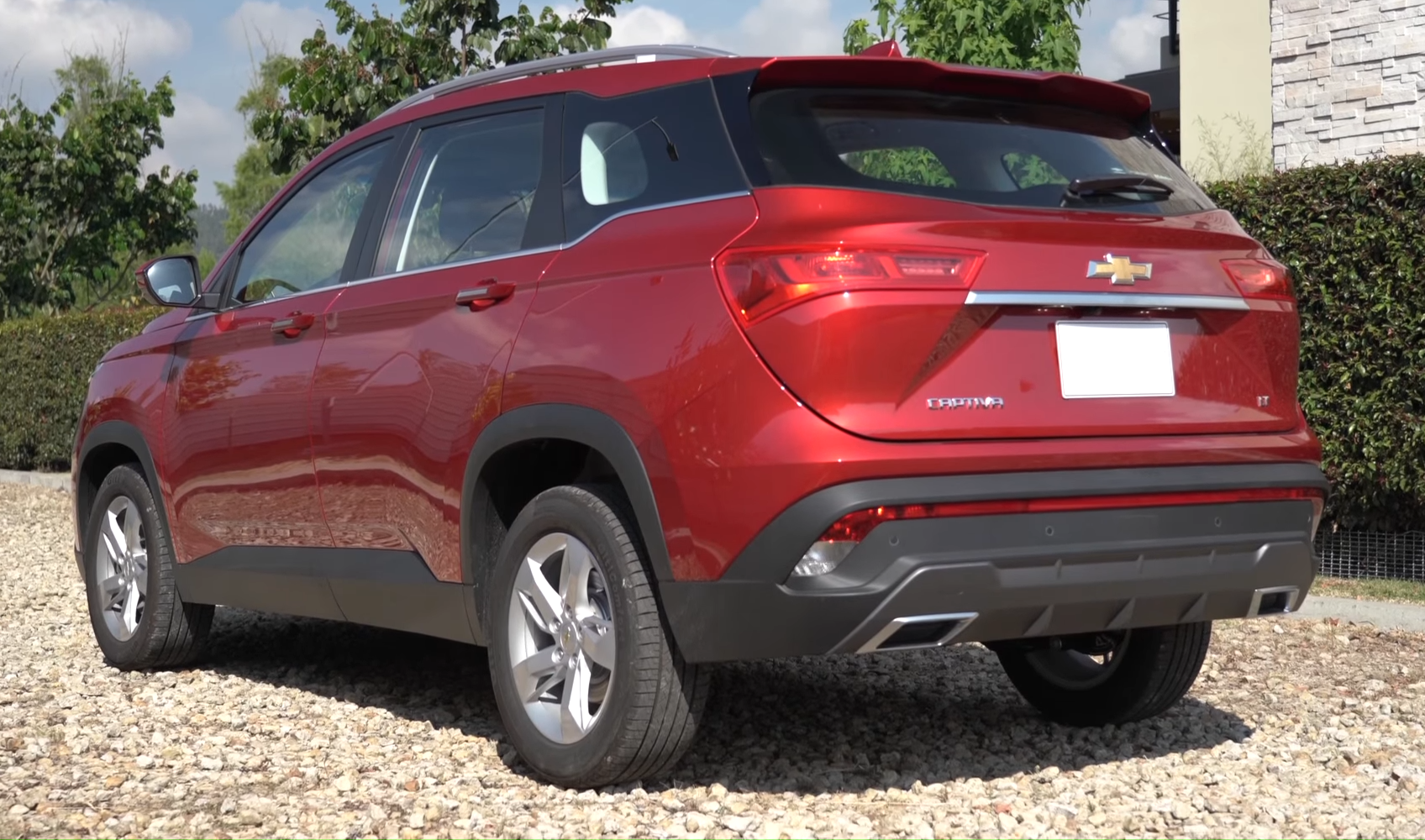
2020 Chevrolet Captiva 1.5T LT (Colombia; pre-facelift)

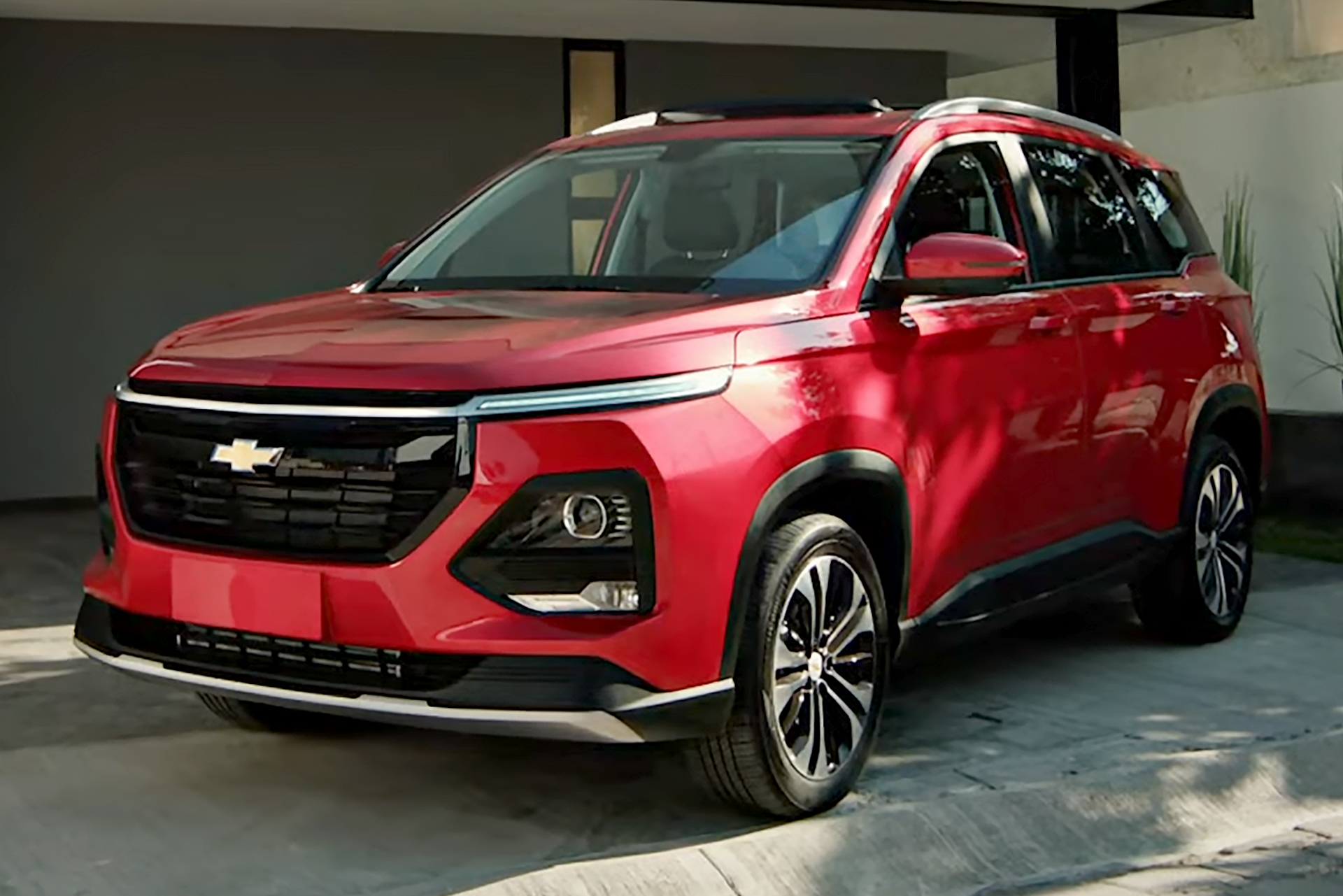
2022 Chevrolet Captiva 1.5T Premier (Mexico; first facelift)

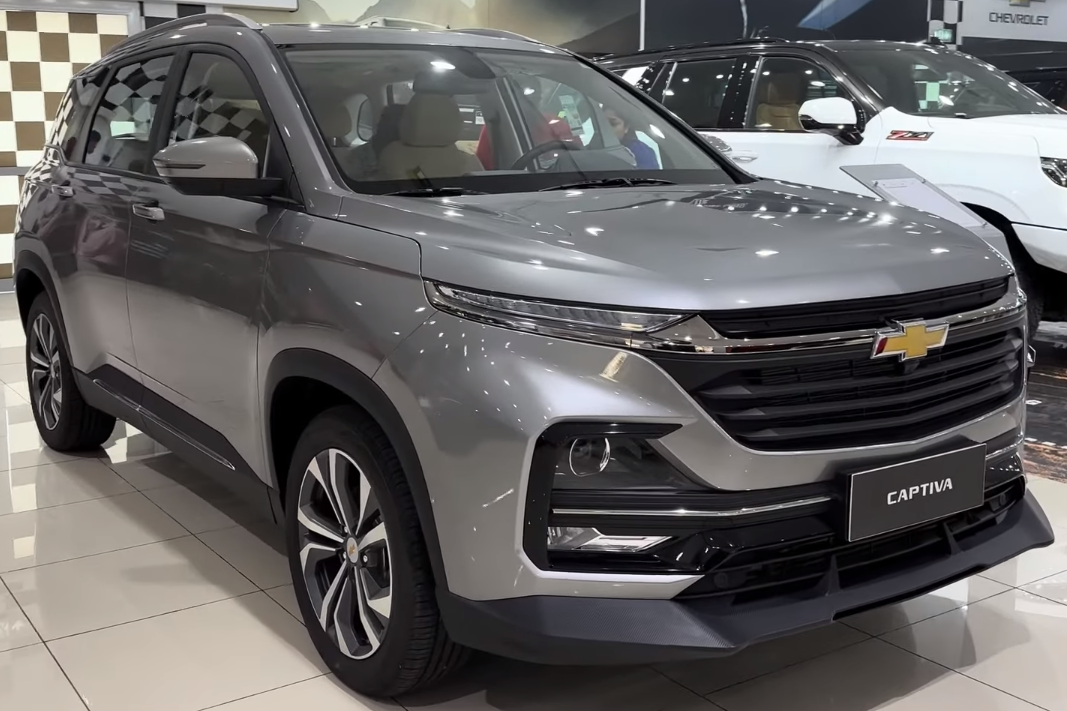
2023 Chevrolet Captiva 1.5T Premier (UAE; second facelift)

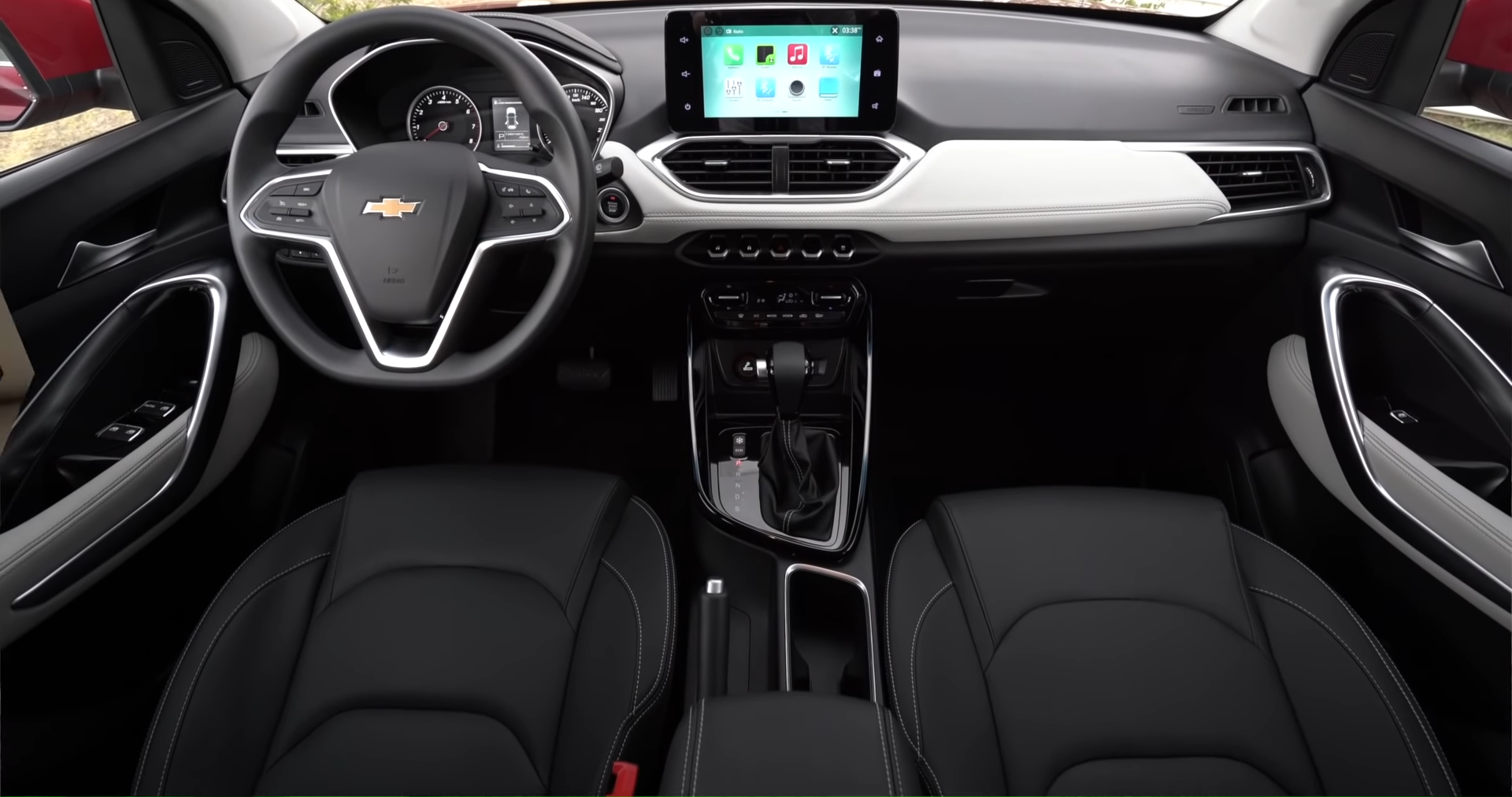
Chevrolet Captiva 1.5T LT interior (Colombia; pre-facelift)

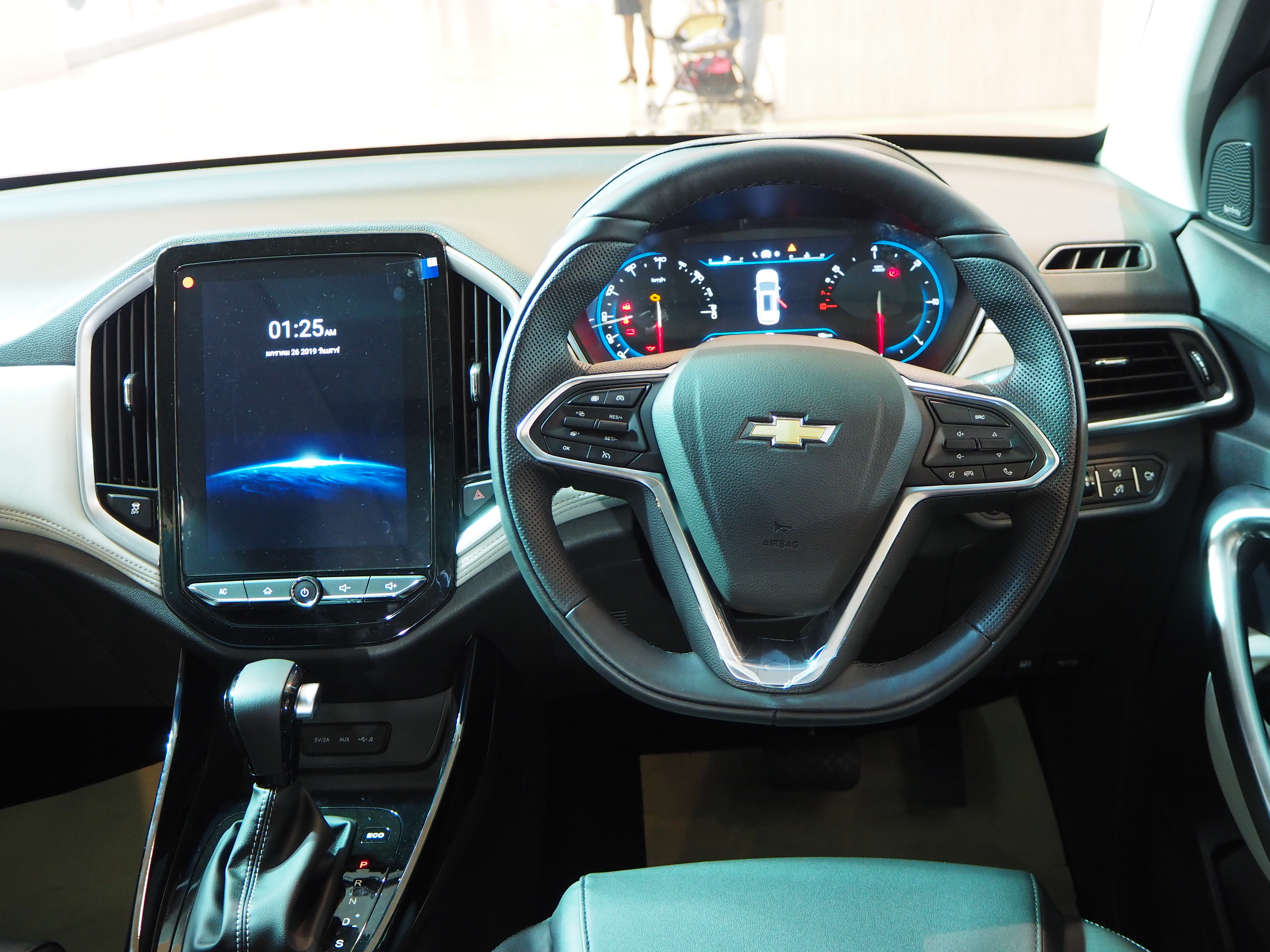
Chevrolet Captiva 1.5T Premier interior (Thailand)

=== MG Hector ===
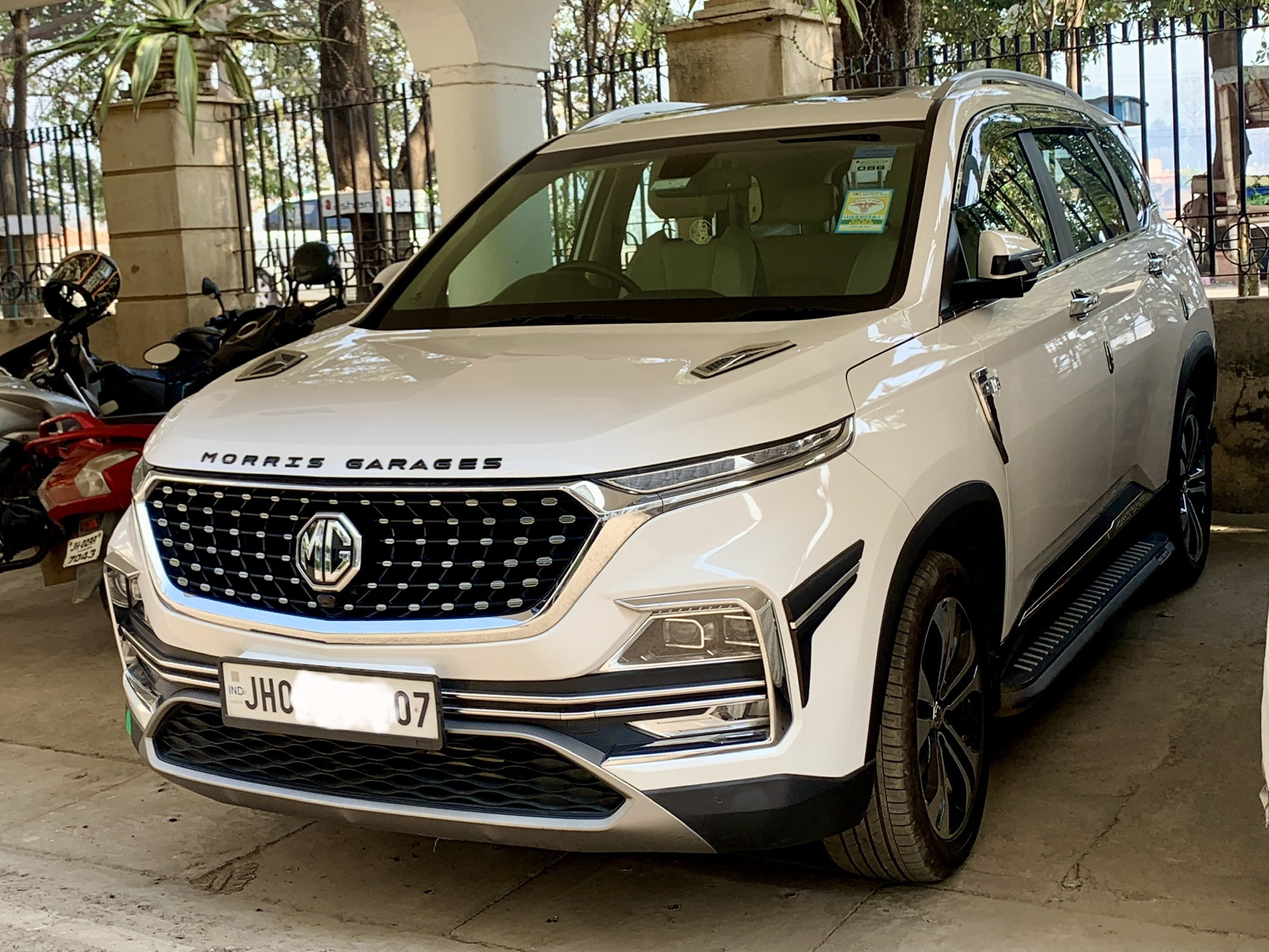
2021 MG Hector (India; pre-facelift)

In India, the 530 was marketed as the MG Hector as the first model in India released by MG Motor India. Production began in a former General Motors plant in Halol, Gujarat, in September 2019, with 75% of content sourced from India. MG Hector sports a honeycomb grille, dual-projector LED headlight, rear LED lights, chrome finish elements in some exterior parts instead of a matte silver finish, and a tail lamp extension garnish.

The Hector is equipped with a 10.4" head unit with more features than Almaz including e-SIM support, navigation system, extensive smartphone integration telematics such as remote engine start, remote AC controls, vehicle locator and tracker. It also comes with Apple CarPlay and Android Auto support, Gaana music streaming service support, and over-the-air (OTA) software update all dubbed as the iSMART technology. All MG Hector (except the Style variant) gained an 'Internet Inside' branding emblem in the exterior. The ‘Sharp’ variant also comes with a Panoramic Sunroof and Automatic Boot.

The Hector is available in four trim levels: Style, Super, Smart and Sharp, and available in three different engine options: 1.5-litre petrol turbo, 1.5-litre petrol turbo with mild hybrid technology, and a 2.0-litre turbo-diesel sourced from Stellantis. Only the former engine received an automatic transmission option, specifically dual-clutch transmission. ‘Style’ is the base variant while ‘Sharp’ is the top variant.

The promotional videos for MG Hector was filmed in London, United Kingdom, featuring British actor Benedict Cumberbatch as the MG Motor brand ambassador.

An updated version was released in January 2021 for the 2021 model year. It features a reworked front grille, new 18-inch alloy wheels, and a beige interior colour scheme. The petrol version of the 2021 Hector is also offered with a CVT gearbox option alongside the 6-speed DCT. Another updated version was launched in January 2023 as a 2023 model year. It features a redesigned large grille, 14 inch touchscreen and ADAS Level 2.

On December 15, 2025, a second updated version was released. Along with new 18-inch alloys and a redesigned rear bumper, the front grille features a premium honeycomb pattern with updated air dams and chrome accents. The two new colors, Celadon Blue and Pearl White, are added to the lighting, which is still split LED headlights and connected tail lamps.

==== MG Hector Plus ====
In Auto Expo 2020, MG Motor India introduced the MG Hector Plus as the three-row variant of the Hector. The Hector Plus features a new fascia look with new bumpers, headlights and taillights. It was released in July 2020, with two seat configuration options: 6-seater (captain seat) and 7-seater (bench seat).

It was updated in January 2021 alongside the regular Hector, featuring larger 18-inch alloy wheels.

It was updated in January 2023 along with regular Hector, featuring redesigned large grille, 14 inch touchscreen and ADAS Level 2.

A second updated version was unveiled on 15 December 2025 gets Aura Hex Grille, I-Swipe Gestures and 18 inch alloy wheels

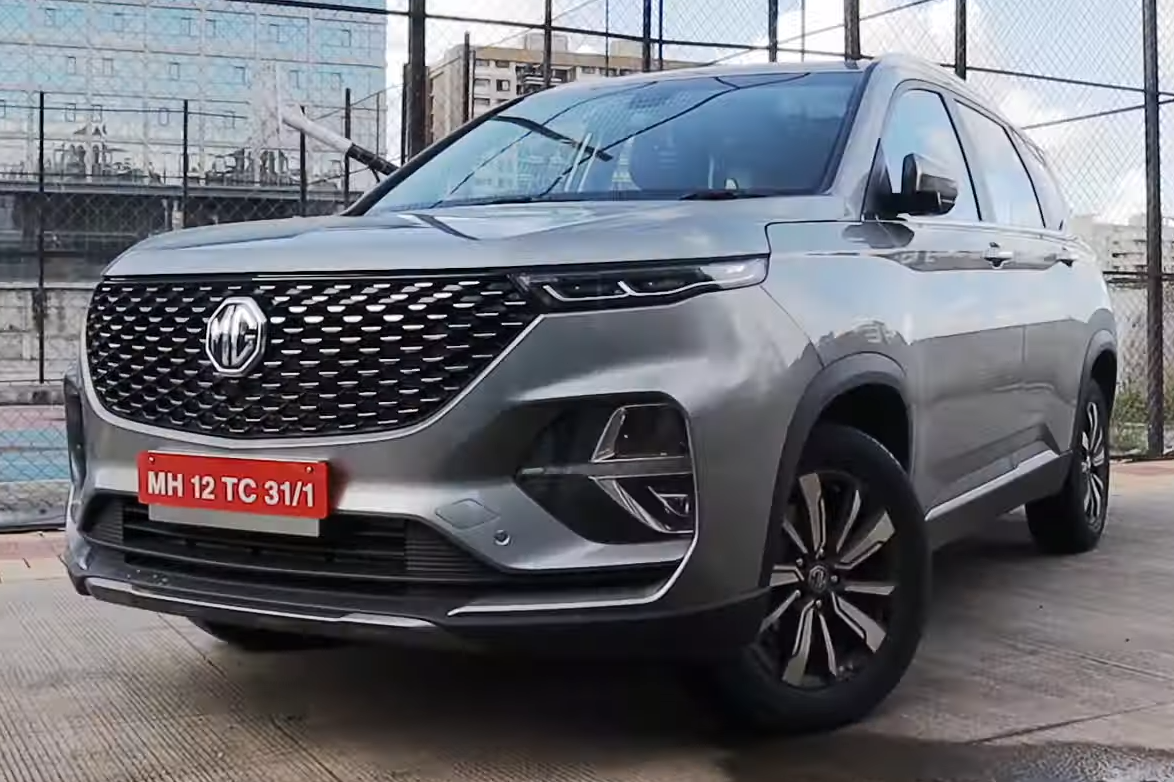
Front view (India)

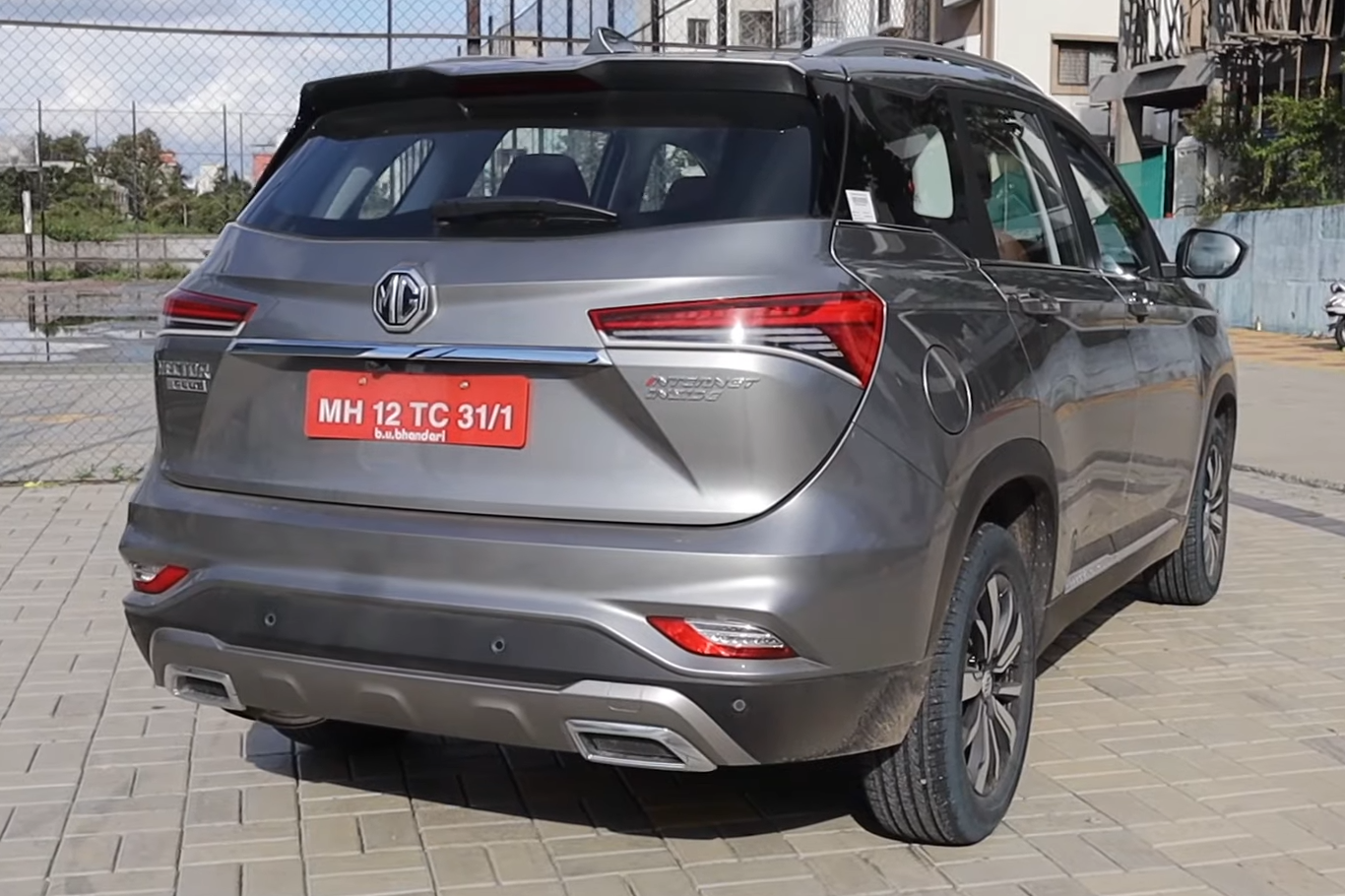
Rear view (India)

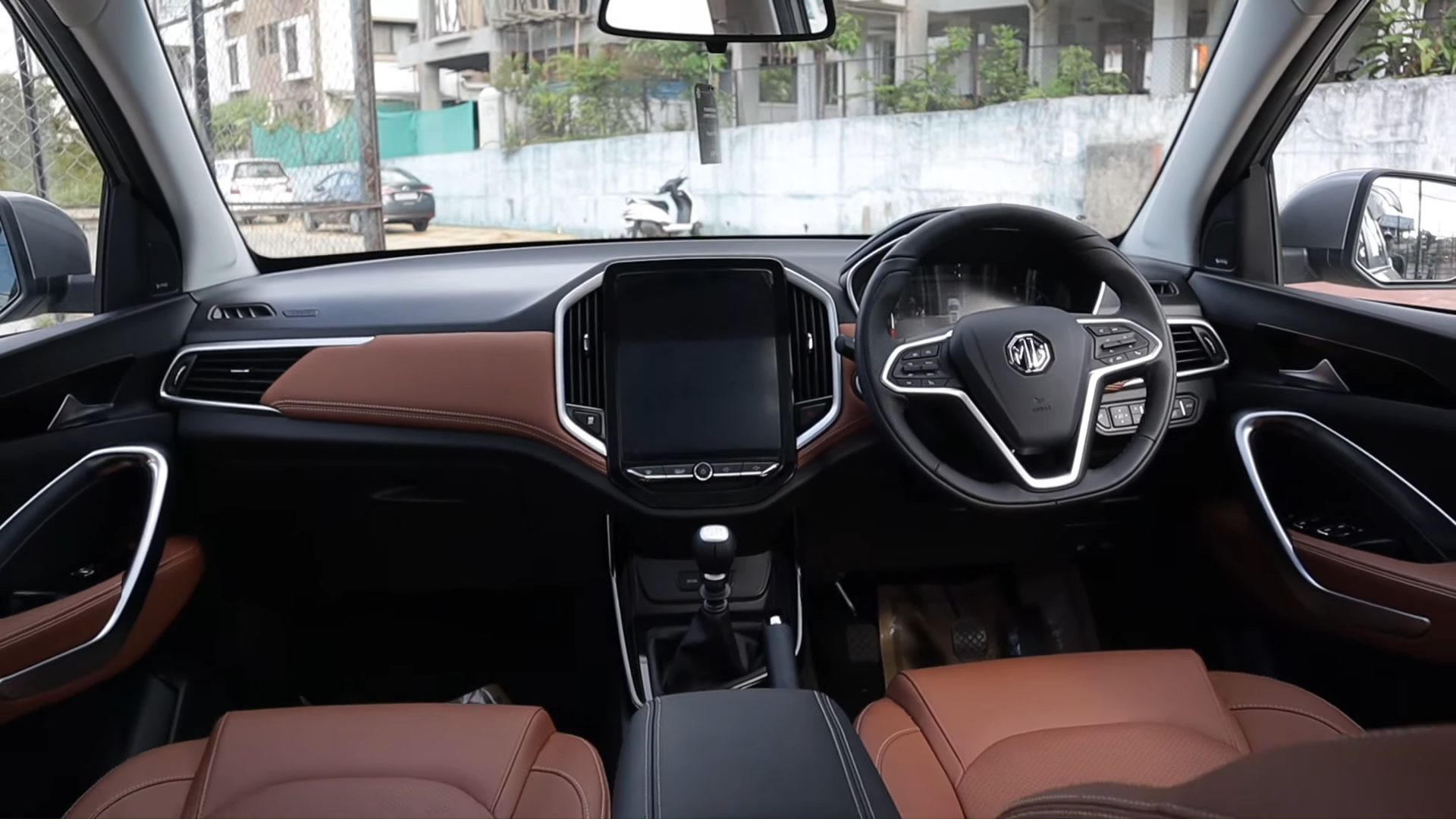
Interior (India)

== Powertrain ==
Model	Engine code	Displacement	Power	Torque	Transmission	Markets
1.5T	LJO	1,451 cc	110 kW (147 hp; 150 PS) at 5,500 rpm	230 N⋅m (23 kg⋅m; 170 lb⋅ft) at 2,000–3,800 rpm	6-speed manual, 6-speed DCT	China (2018 model), Latin America
1.5T	LJO	1,451 cc	108 kW (145 hp; 147 PS) at 5,500 rpm	250–255 N⋅m (25.5–26.0 kg⋅m; 184–188 lb⋅ft) at 1,600–3,600 rpm	6-speed manual, CVT	China (2019 model), Latin America/Middle East
1.5T	LJO	1,451 cc	105 kW (141 hp; 143 PS) at 5,200 rpm	250 N⋅m (25 kg⋅m; 180 lb⋅ft) at 1,600–3,600 rpm	6-speed manual, 6-speed DCT, CVT	India
1.5T	LJO	1,451 cc	104 kW (140 hp; 142 PS) at 5,200 rpm	250 N⋅m (25 kg⋅m; 180 lb⋅ft) at 1,600–3,600 rpm	6-speed manual, CVT	Indonesia, Thailand
1.8	LJ4	1,798 cc	101 kW (135 hp; 137 PS) at 5,600 rpm	186 N⋅m (19.0 kg⋅m; 137 lb⋅ft) at 3,600–4,600 rpm	5-speed AMT	China (2018 model)
2.0 Diesel	Multijet II	1,956 cc	125 kW (168 hp; 170 PS) at 3,750 rpm	350 N⋅m (36 kg⋅m; 260 lb⋅ft) at 1,750–2,500 rpm	6-speed manual	India
2.0 Hybrid	LJM20A	1,999 cc Atkinson cycle	92 kW (123 hp; 125 PS) at 5,600 rpm (engine); 130 kW (174 hp; 177 PS) (motor)	168 N⋅m (17 kg⋅m; 124 lb⋅ft) at 4,000–4,400 rpm (engine); 320 N⋅m (33 kg⋅m; 236 lb⋅ft) (motor)	Dedicated Hybrid Transmission	Indonesia

== Sales ==
In 2022, the Captiva-badged 530 became the best-selling SUV in Mexico.

Year	Baojun 530	Wuling Almaz		MG Hector	Chevrolet Captiva	
Year	China	Indonesia		India	Thailand	Mexico
Year	China	Petrol	Hybrid	India	Thailand	Mexico
2018	116,324	—	—			
2019	83,079	9,743	—	15,930	530	
2020	89,428	1,947	—	25,935	2,588	
2021	93,432	9,694	—	31,509	138	10,761
2022	37,334	3,374	337	22,631		19,178
2023	—	1,457	399	31,009		17,345
2024	—	652	522			17,349
2025	—	152	88			16,649
