= Wuling Victory =

Mid-size MPV

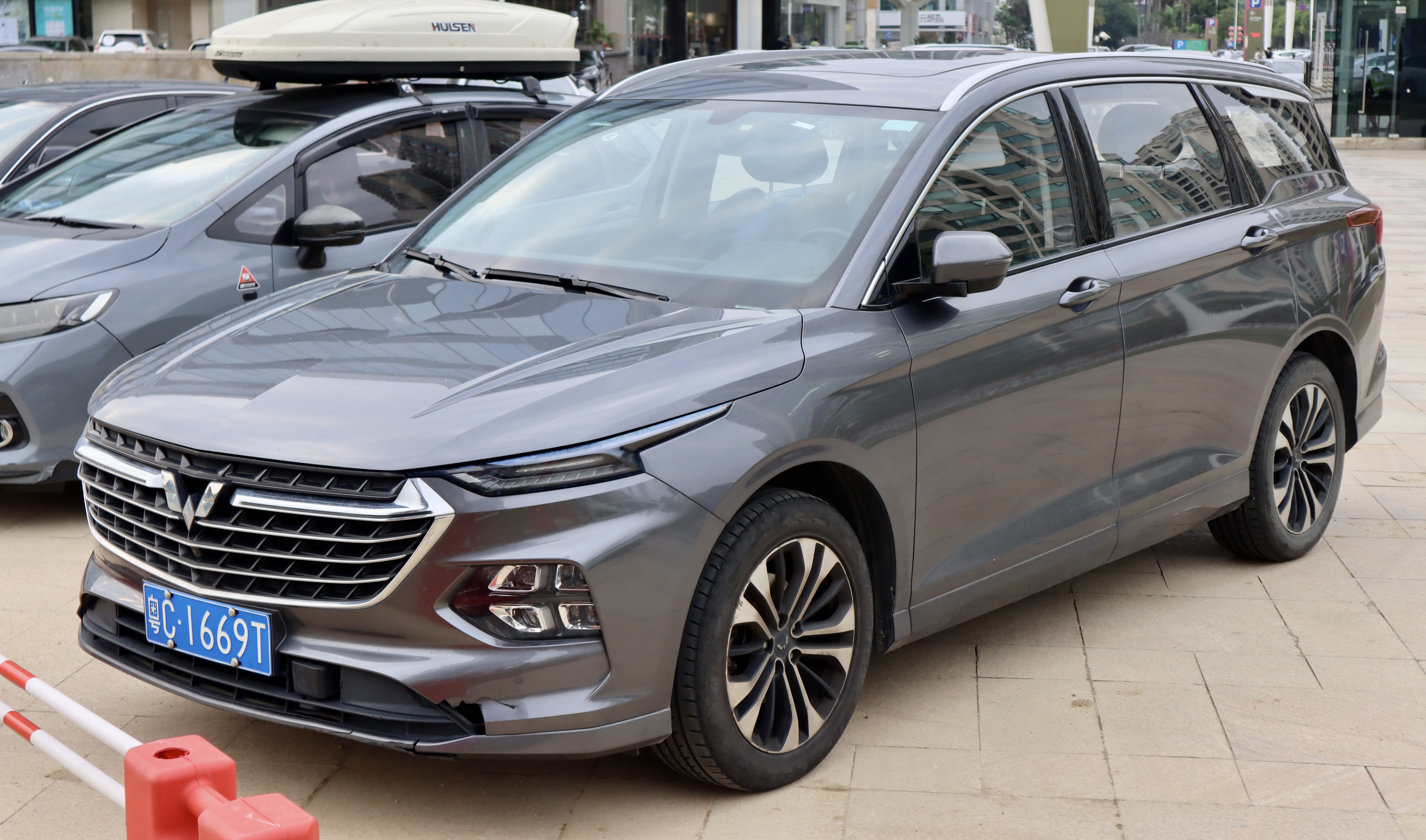

Overview
- Manufacturer: SAIC-GM-Wuling
- Model code: CN220M
- Also called: Wuling Kaijie
- Production: 2020–present
- Assembly: China: Qingdao, Shandong

Body and chassis
- Class: Mid-size MPV
- Body style: 5-door wagon
- Layout: Front-engine, front-wheel-drive

Powertrain
- Engine: Petrol: 1.5 L LJO turbo I4; 2.0 L LJM20A I4 (Hybrid)
- Power output: 108 kW (145 hp; 147 PS); 92 kW (123 hp; 125 PS) (2.0 L hybrid, engine only); 130 kW (174 hp; 177 PS) (2.0 L hybrid, combined)
- Transmission: 6-speed manual; CVT

Dimensions
- Wheelbase: 2,800 mm (110.2 in)
- Length: 4,875 mm (191.9 in)
- Width: 1,880 mm (74.0 in)
- Height: 1,690–1,700 mm (66.5–66.9 in)
- Kerb weight: 1,600–1,730 kg (3,527–3,814 lb)

The Wuling Victory (Chinese: 五菱凯捷; pinyin: Wǔlíng Kǎijié) is a mid-size multi-purpose vehicle (MPV) produced by SAIC-GM-Wuling through the Wuling brand.

== Overview ==
The Victory debuted at the 2020 Chengdu Motor Show as the first global model sold under the Wuling brand. The Victory is the first model to wear the updated Wuling global's silver logo, and one of the pre-production unit of the vehicle is also the 22 millionth vehicle to roll off the SAIC-GM-Wuling's assembly lines.

== Specifications ==
The Victory is powered by a turbocharged two 4-cylinder engines: the onenis 1.5-litre LJO four-cylinder engine producing 108 kW (145 hp; 147 PS) at 5,200 rpm and 250 N⋅m (180 lb⋅ft) of torque from 2,200 to 3,400 rpm, and the other one is 2.0 litre hybrid with The engine with 130 kW (174 hp; 177 PS) combined. Mated to either a six-speed manual or a continuously variable transmission with eight pre-programmed gear ratios while the hybrid is mated with Intelligent DHT transmission.

In China, the Victory is offered in Elite (Chinese: 精英; pinyin: Jīngyīng), Noble (Chinese: 尊贵; pinyin: Zūnguì), and Flagship (Chinese: 旗舰; pinyin: Qíjiàn) grade levels.

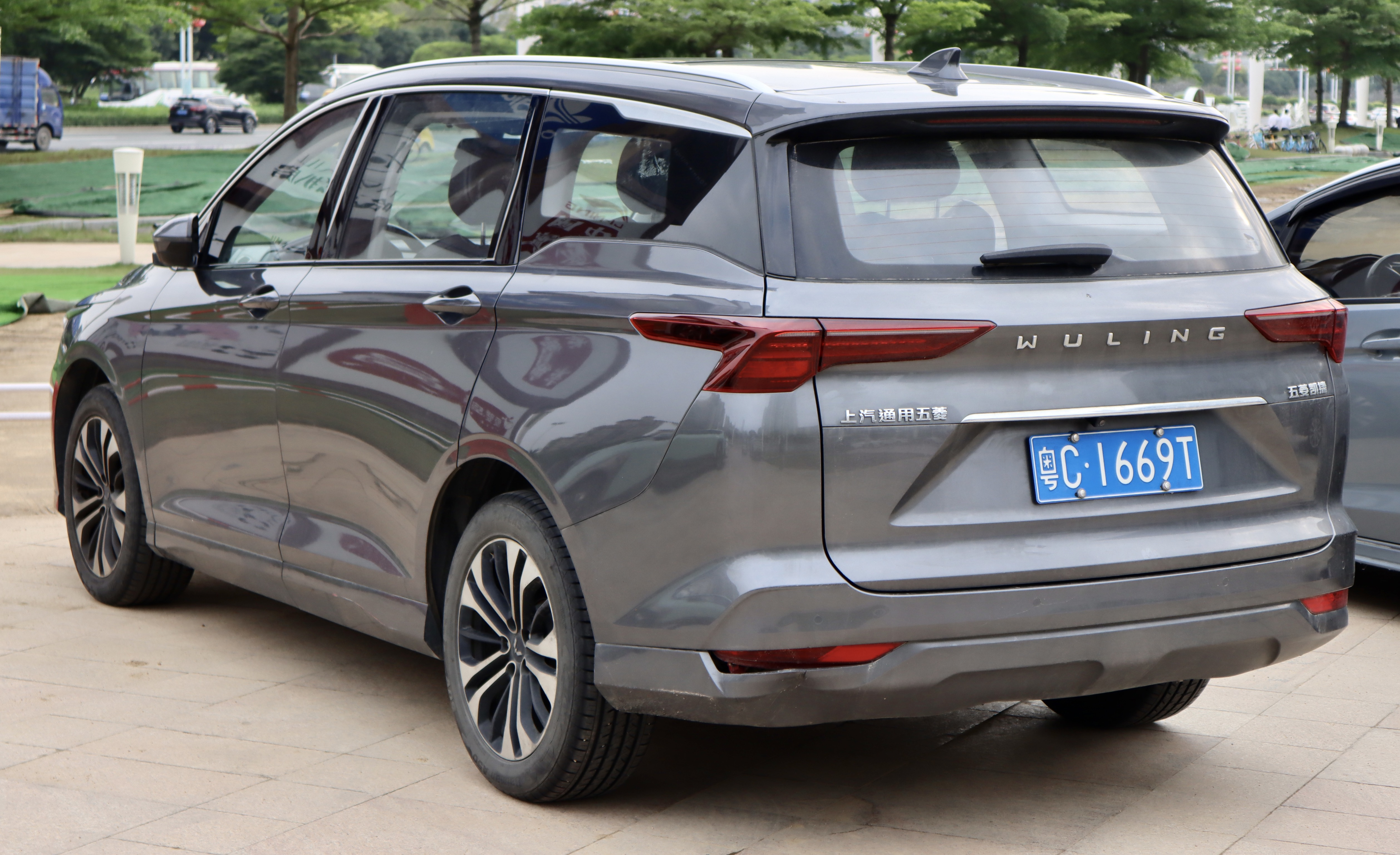
Rear view

== Sales ==
Year	China
2020	16,932
2021	63,316
2022	19,839
2023	6,790
2024	3,020
2025	22
