= Wuling Starlight L =

Plug-in hybrid mid-size crossover SUV

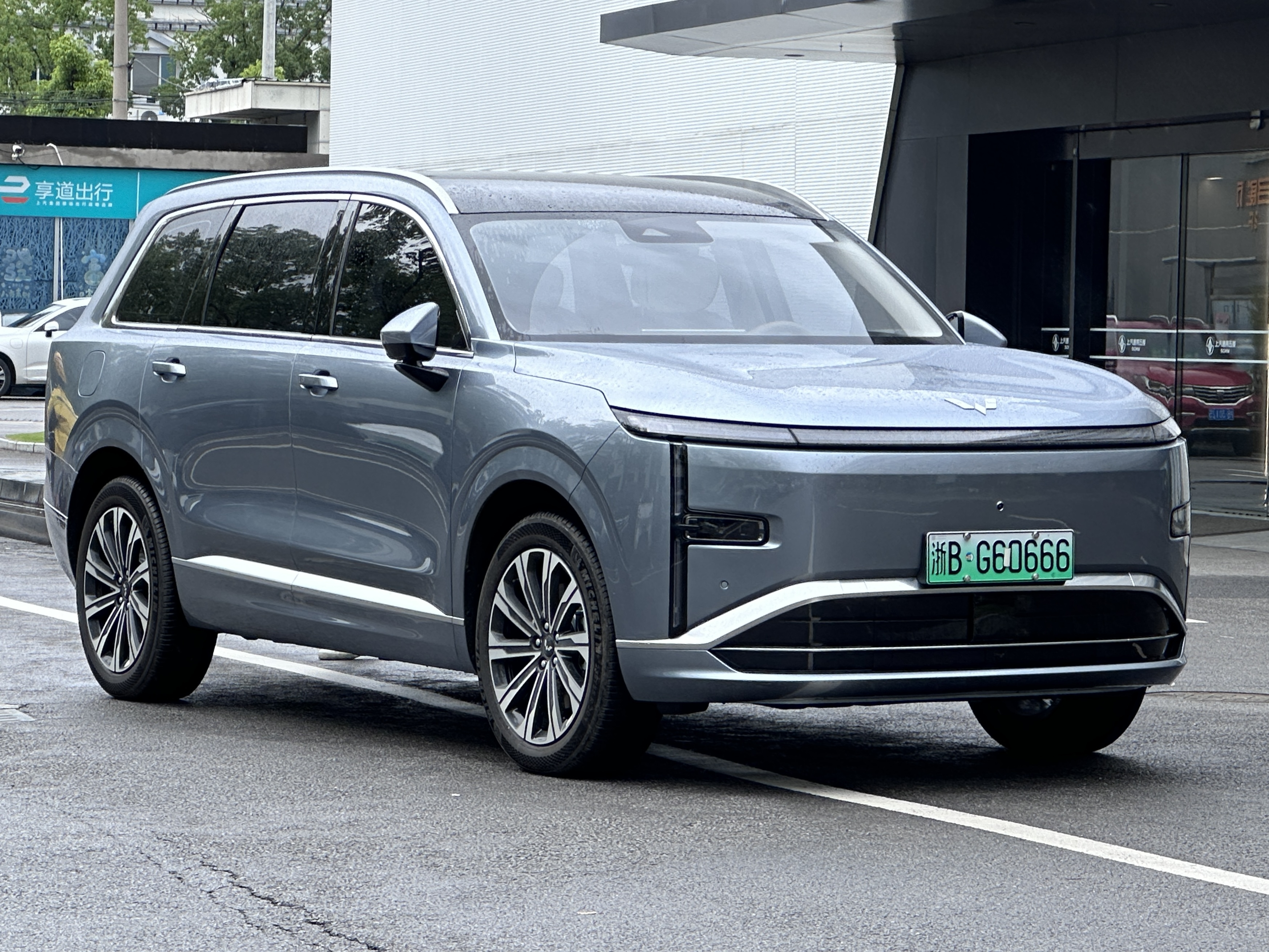

Overview
- Manufacturer: SAIC-GM-Wuling
- Model code: F610S
- Also called: Wuling Xingguang L
- Production: 2026–present
- Assembly: China: Liuzhou, Guangxi
- Designer: Under the lead of Gabriel Nemeth

Body and chassis
- Class: Mid-size crossover SUV (D)
- Body style: 5-door SUV
- Layout: Front-engine, front-motor, front-wheel-drive
- Platform: Tianyu Architecture
- Related: Wuling Starlight M

Powertrain
- Engine: Petrol plug-in hybrid: 1.5 L LBG naturally aspirated I4; 1.5 L LBT turbo I4
- Electric motor: Permanent magnet synchronous
- Transmission: e-CVT
- Hybrid drivetrain: Series-parallel (PHEV)
- Battery: Lithium iron phosphate
- Electric range: 174 mi (280 km)

Dimensions
- Wheelbase: 2,950 mm (116.1 in)
- Length: 4,980 mm (196.1 in)
- Width: 1,930 mm (76.0 in)
- Height: 1,760 mm (69.3 in)

The Wuling Starlight L (Chinese: 五菱星光L; pinyin: Wǔlíng Xingguang L) is a plug-in hybrid mid-size crossover SUV produced by SAIC-GM-Wuling under the Wuling marque.

== Overview ==
Photos of the Starlight L was first released in December 2025. It is Wuling's flagship model, represents the marque's entry into China's large crossover market, and is also the marque's first 3-row model with a 6-seat, 2+2+2 configuration. The Starlight L was launched in 2026.

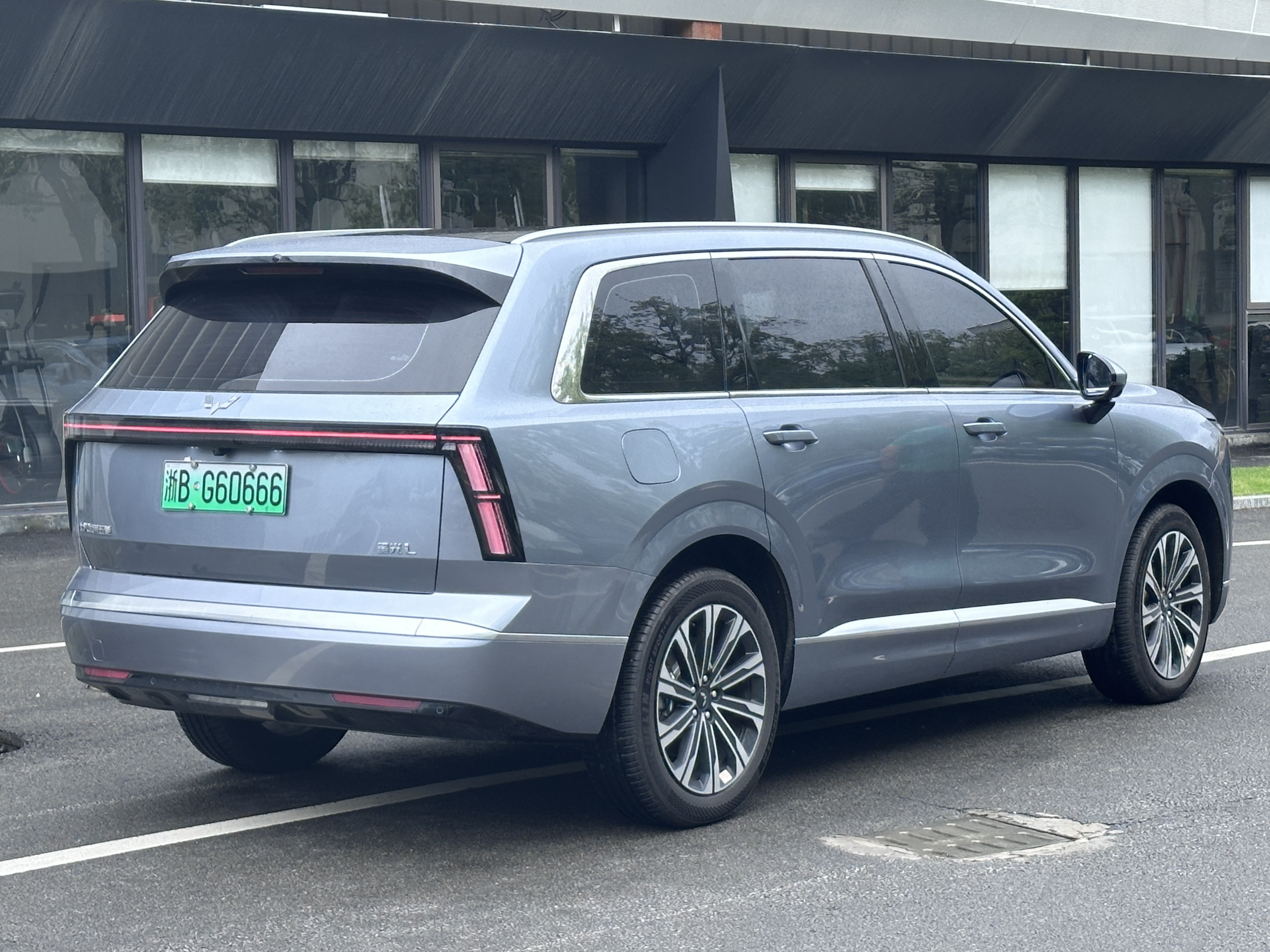
Rear view

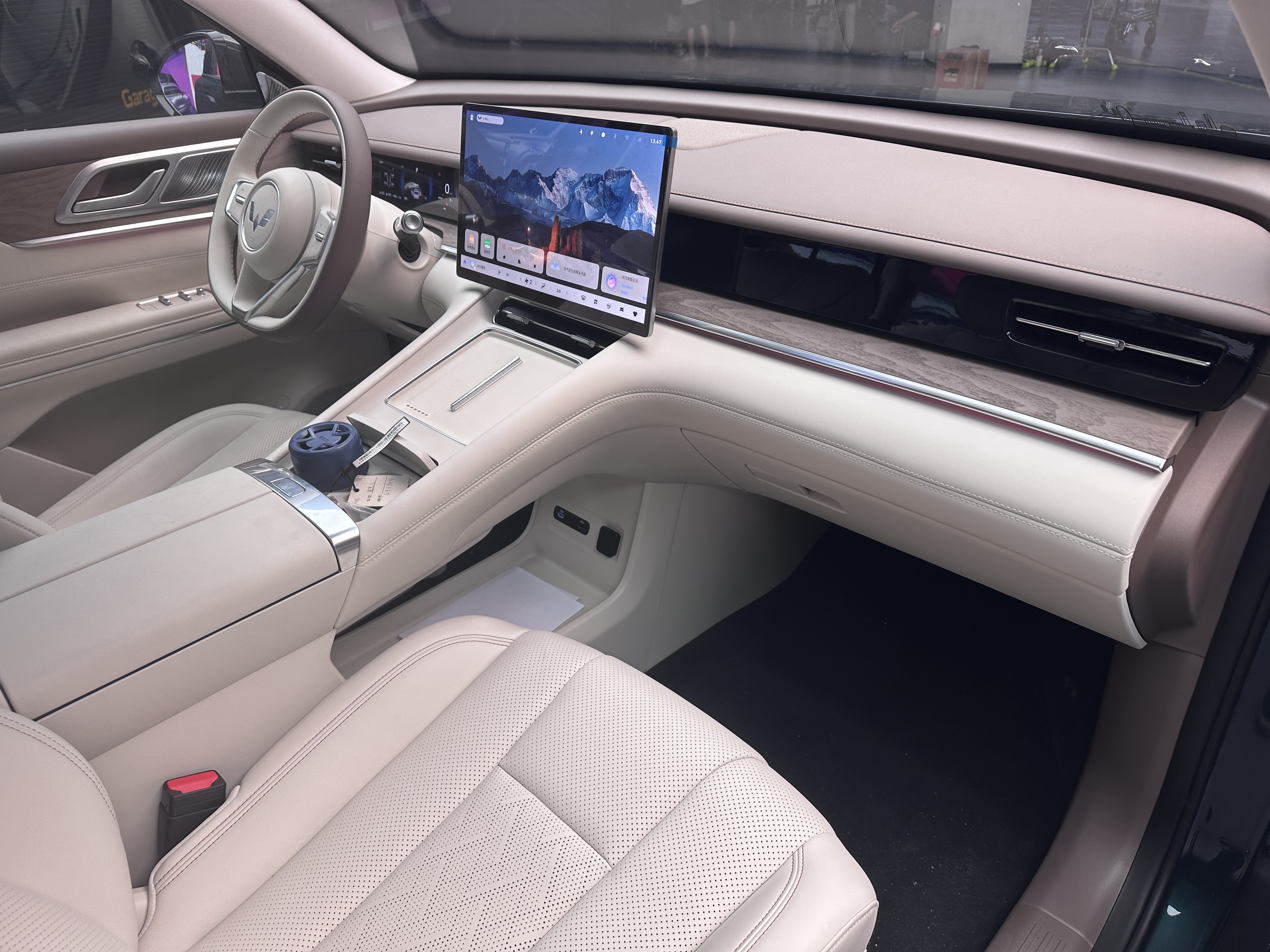
Interior

=== Design ===
The Starlight L debuts Wuling's new Aerial Aesthetics design language. LED light strips are present on both the front and back of the Starlight L. Chrome trim is added around the windows. The design is similar to that of the other Starlight series vehicles. A trapezoidal horizontal air intake is utilized at the front. In addition to using full-width LED light bars, small vertical light bars are also used on both ends.

=== Features ===
Spyshots of the Starlight L show a large central touchscreen, a digital instrument cluster, a column shifter, and a center touchscreen integrating wireless chargers. Second-row passengers get touchscreens. It utilizes traditional door handles.

== Powertrain ==
The Starlight L uses a plug-in hybrid system with two engine choices, both being 1.5 liter inline 4 petrol engines: A turbocharged version codenamed LBT producing 141 horsepower and a naturally aspirated version codenamed LBG producing 105 horsepower. The electric motor also produces 105 horsepower. It uses a lithium iron phosphate battery of unknown capacity, however the Starlight L has an electric-only range of up to 174 miles. The fuel consumption figures are 5.85 L/100 km (40.2 mpg_{‑US}) and 5.9 L/100 km (40 mpg_{‑US}) for the naturally aspirated and turbocharged versions respectively.
