= Wuling Starlight M =

Full-size minivan

Overview
- Manufacturer: SAIC-GM-Wuling
- Model code: F610M
- Also called: Wuling Xingguang M
- Production: 2026–present
- Assembly: China: Liuzhou, Guangxi
- Designer: Under the lead of Gabriel Nemeth

Body and chassis
- Class: Full-size minivan (M)
- Body style: 5-door minivan
- Layout: Front-motor, front-wheel-drive (EV); Front-engine, front-motor, front-wheel drive (PHEV)
- Platform: Tianyu Architecture
- Related: Wuling Starlight L

Powertrain
- Engine: Petrol plug-in hybrid: 1.5 L LBT I4
- Electric motor: Permanent magnet synchronous
- Power output: 105 kW (141 hp; 143 PS) (PHEV, engine)
- Transmission: e-CVT / multi-mode DHT
- Hybrid drivetrain: Plug-in hybrid
- Battery: 37.9 kWh Gotion LFP
- Electric range: 170 km (106 mi) (PHEV, WLTC)

Dimensions
- Wheelbase: 3,000 mm (118.1 in)
- Length: 5,150 mm (202.8 in)
- Width: 1,920 mm (75.6 in)
- Height: 1,820 mm (71.7 in)
- Curb weight: 2,180–2,930 kg (4,806–6,460 lb)

The Wuling Starlight M (Chinese: 五菱星光M; pinyin: Wǔlíng Xingguang M) is a full-size minivan manufactured by SAIC-GM-Wuling (SGMW) since 2026 under the Wuling brand. It is available with two powertrain options: battery electric (EV) and plug-in hybrid (PHEV). The PHEV variant was planned to be unveiled first in December 2026.

== Overview ==
The Wuling Starlight M was first unveiled in images in August 2026. Images show a 7-seater full-size MPV with a 2+2+3 seating setup. The styling of the Starlight M shares the same design philosophy with the Wuling Starlight L flagship crossover SUV. The Starlight M is available as a plug-in hybrid variant with a 1.5 liter turbo engine paired with a 37.9 kWh battery pack that supports a pure electric range of 170 km and produces a maximum power output of 143 Ps, and a fully electric variant is planned to be launched later.

Rear view
