= Porpoise (disambiguation) =

A porpoise is a marine mammal of the family Phocoenidae.

Porpoise may also refer to:

- Dolphin or dolphin-like marine mammal, previously used in American English
- Porpoise (scuba gear), a trade name for scuba gear developed by Ted Eldred in Australia
- Porpoise class submarine (disambiguation), various classes of British or United States submarines
- HMS Porpoise, several British Royal Navy ships
- USS Porpoise, several United States Navy ships
- Karry Porpoise, a Chinese electric commercial van
- President Porpoise, a character in the animated series Adventure Time episode "President Porpoise Is Missing!"

== See also ==
- Porpoising, a fault encountered in ground effect racing cars
