= S22 =

S22 may refer to:

== Aviation ==
- Hermiston Municipal Airport, in Umatilla County, Oregon, United States
- Letov Š-22, a prototype Czechoslovak fighter
- SIAI S.22, an Italian racing flying boat
- Sikorsky S-22, a Russian trainer

== Rail and transit ==
- S22 (RER Vaud), an S-Bahn line in Switzerland
- S20 (St. Gallen S-Bahn), a St. Gallen S-Bahn rush-hour service, Switzerland
- S22 (ZVV), a former Zurich S-Bahn line, Switzerland
- Kozawa Station, in Kyōwa, Hokkaidō, Japan
- Shōji Station (Osaka, Osaka), in Japan

== Roads ==
- Expressway S22 (Poland)
- County Route S22 (California), United States

== Submarines ==
- Brazilian submarine Riachuelo (S22)
- Chilean submarine O'Brien (S22)
- HMS Resolution (S22), of the Royal Navy
- INS Khanderi (1968), of the Indian Navy
- INS Khanderi (2017), of the Indian Navy
- USS S-22 (SS-127), of the United States Navy

== Other uses ==
- British NVC community S22, a swamps and tall-herb fens community in the British National Vegetation Classification system
- Karry S22, a Chinese MPV
- S22: Do not breathe dust, a safety phrase
- Samsung Galaxy S22, a series of smartphones
- Sisu S-22, a Finnish lorry
