= Karry Lingmi =

Chinese electric light truck

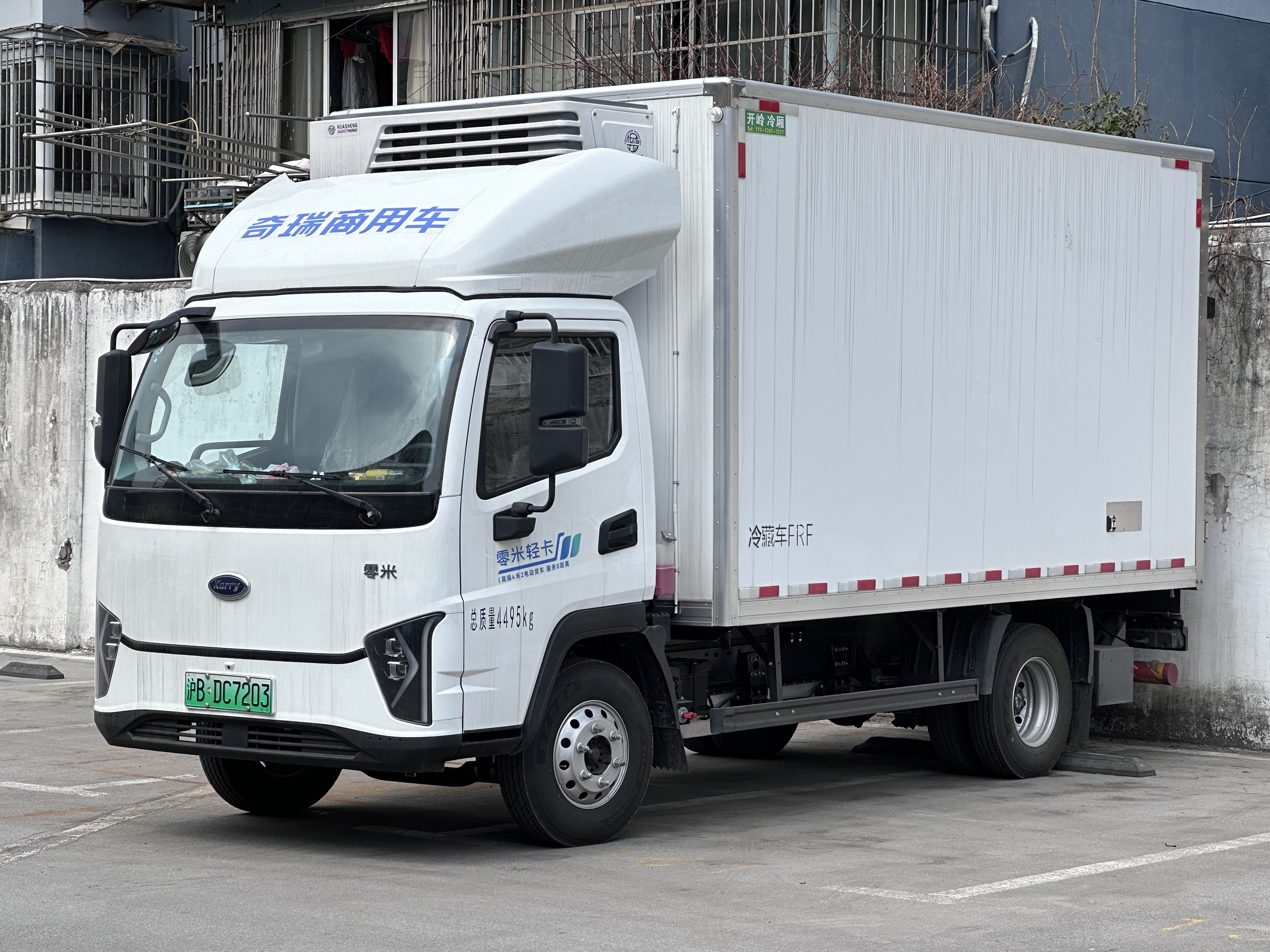

Overview
- Manufacturer: Karry
- Also called: Chevoo Changjiang No. 9
- Production: 2024–present
- Assembly: China: Wuhu, Anhui

Body and chassis
- Class: Light truck
- Body style: Cab-over
- Layout: Rear-motor, rear-wheel-drive

Dimensions
- Wheelbase: 3,360 mm (132.3 in)
- Length: 5,995 mm (236.0 in)
- Width: 2,200 mm (86.6 in)
- Height: 2,370–3,320 mm (93.3–130.7 in)

The Karry Lingmi (Chinese: 开瑞零米) is a battery electric light truck produced by Karry, the commercial vehicle sub-brand of Chery since 2024.

== Overview ==
The Karry announced the Lingmi series during a product launch event in June 2024. At the event, The company presented Lingmi as a dedicated electric light truck brand aimed at the growing international logistics market. The launch formed part of Chery Commercial Vehicle wider expansion of its new-energy commercial vehicle range, which also included the Jiangtun E5 electric van and Little Elephant electric truck series.

In June 2024, The Lingmi series appeared in China Ministry of Industry and Information Technology (MIIT) vehicle approval catalogue, including cargo box, flatbed and chassis-cab variants intended for the 4.2-metre electric light truck market.

In August 2024, The Chery Commercial Vehicle formally launched the Lingmi light truck family, described by battery supplier CATL as Chery's first dedicated electric light-truck platform. According to CATL, the launch generated more than 4,500 orders at the unveiling event.

== Specifications ==
The Lingmi was developed as a battery electric cab over light truck designed for short and medium distance logistics operations. The vehicle competes in China's highly competitive 4.2-metre truck segment, a category widely used for urban freight transport and last-mile delivery services. The Lingmi range includes multiple body configurations, including box van, cargo truck, flatbed truck, and chassis-cab variants.

The vehicles use lithium-ion battery packs supplied by CATL and are positioned as premium electric logistics trucks within Karry's commercial vehicle portfolio. Battery options include 86.55kWh, 100.07kWh, 100.46kWh, and 120.27kWh. Maximum power output is 120kW and 360N·m with a top speed of 100km/h. The electric range ranges from 260km to 420km depending on the specifications.

== Chevoo Changjiang No. 9 ==
The Chevoo Changjiang No. 9 (长江9号) is a rebadged derivative of the Lingmi developed for the Changjiang commercial vehicle brand operated by Chevoo, another commercial sub-brand owned by Chery.
