= Karry Dolphin =

Battery electric van

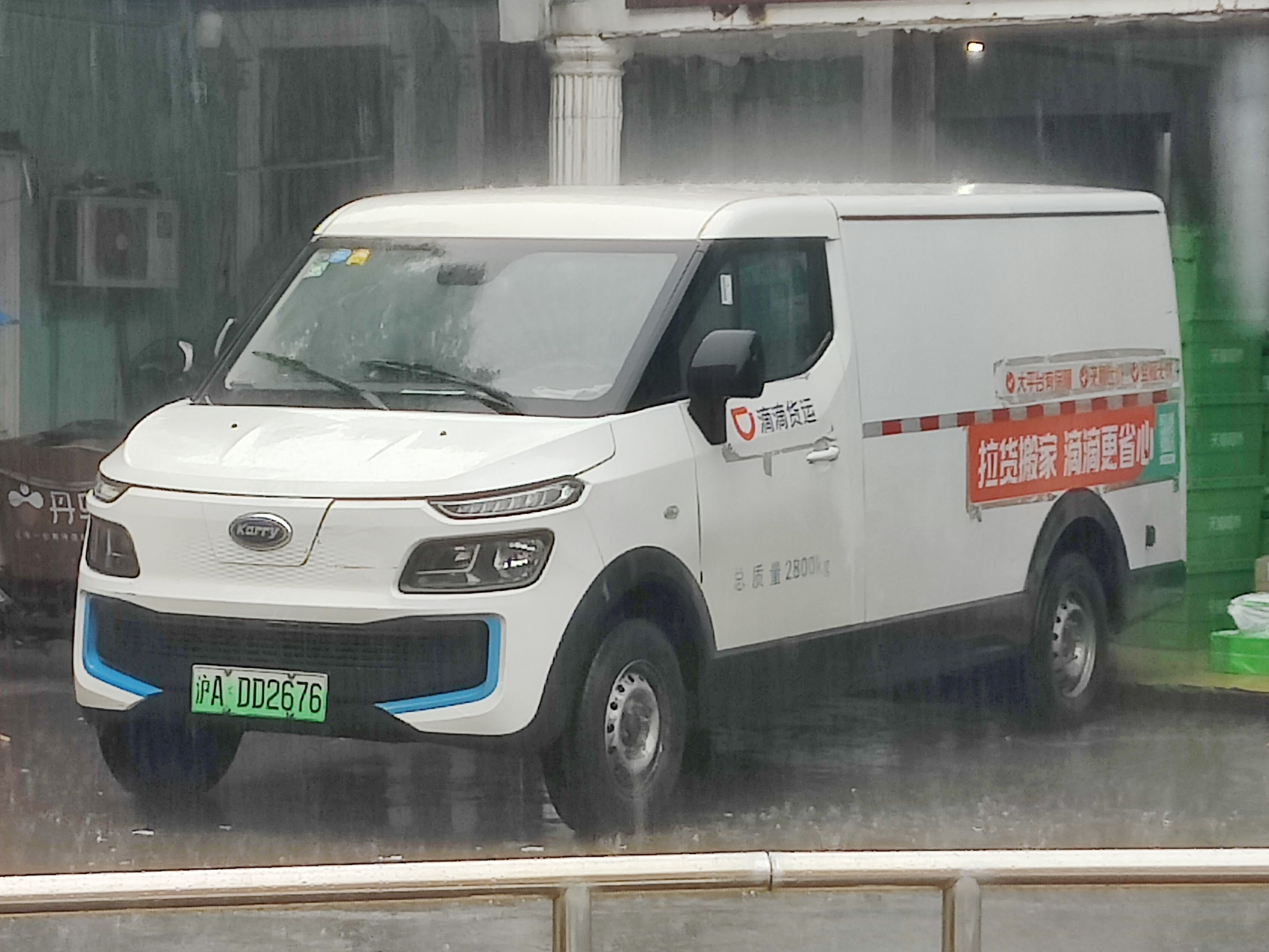
- The Karry Dolphin in Shanghai.

Overview
- Manufacturer: Karry
- Also called: Karry Haitun; MASTA EV Van (South Korea); HWE Elemo-L (Japan); Cenntro Logistar 260 (Europe); B-ON Pelkan (Luxembourg)
- Production: 2019–present
- Assembly: China: Wuhu, Anhui; South Korea: Cheonan

Body and chassis
- Class: Light commercial vehicle
- Body style: 4-door van
- Layout: Rear-engine, rear-wheel-drive

Powertrain
- Electric motor: Permanent magnet synchronous electric motor
- Power output: 86 kW (115 hp; 117 PS)
- Transmission: 1-speed direct-drive
- Battery: Li-iron phosphate battery: 44.5 kWh
- Electric range: 271 km (168 mi); 288 km (179 mi) (MASTA EV Van)

Dimensions
- Wheelbase: 3,380 mm (133.1 in)
- Length: 5,457 mm (214.8 in)
- Width: 1,850 mm (72.8 in)
- Height: 2,046 mm (80.6 in)
- Curb weight: 1,600–1,650 kg (3,527–3,638 lb)

The Karry Dolphin is a battery electric van designed and produced by the Chinese automaker Karry since 2019.

== Overview ==
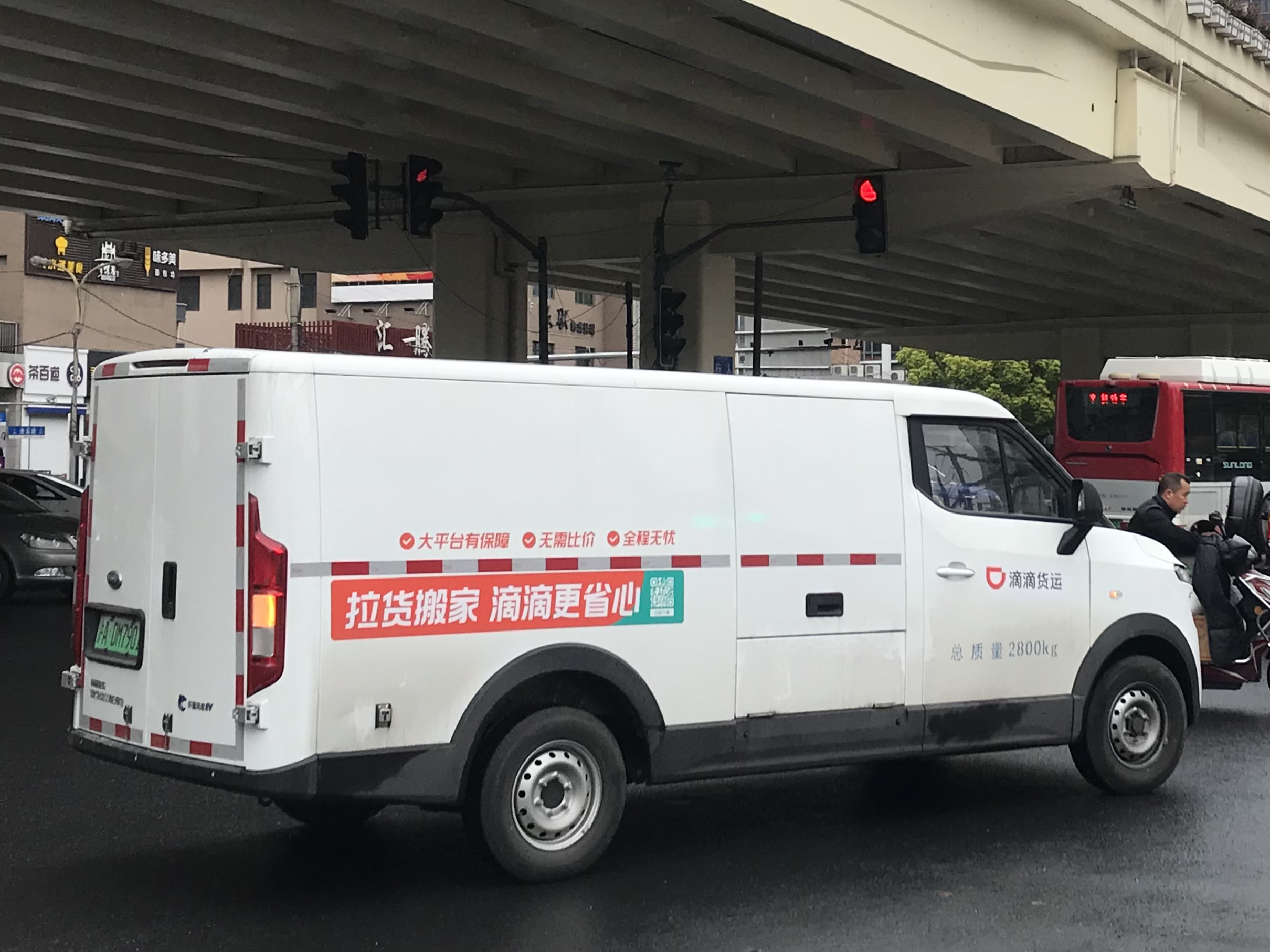
Rear view

The Karry Dolphin EV was launched at the Vanke International Convention Center in Qianhai, Shenzhen on September 19, 2019. Dolphin EV is an fully electric urban logistics van by Karry, specially designed for the needs of urban logistics and distribution.

== Specifications ==
The Karry Dolphin EV was built on a frame chassis with a permanent magnet synchronous electric motor positioned over the rear axle, with the output of which reaching 115 hp, and 230 Nm of torque. A 44.5 kWh lithium iron phosphate flat battery pack is located right under the floor. The Dolphin EV is capable of covering 271 km on one charge. The powertrain layout of the Dolphin EV is rear-wheel drive, with MacPherson-type independent front suspension and rear-dependent leaf springs. The top speed is 100 km/h.

== MASTA EV Van ==
The South Korean specification of the Dolphin EV and it will be expected to launch in the South Korean market by 2022. It was unveiled in 2021 Seoul Mobility Show.

The company said that the Samsung SDI battery will mount in those model, and the model would go up to 288 km (179 mi).

== HWE Elemo-L ==
The Japanese specification of the Dolphin EV and it will be expected to launch in the Japanese market by 21 March 2023 when the model was imported from China to Japan in left-hand drive form (Japan officially being a right-hand drive market). It was unveiled in 2023 Tokyo Auto Salon.
