= Chery Q21 =

Commercial minivan

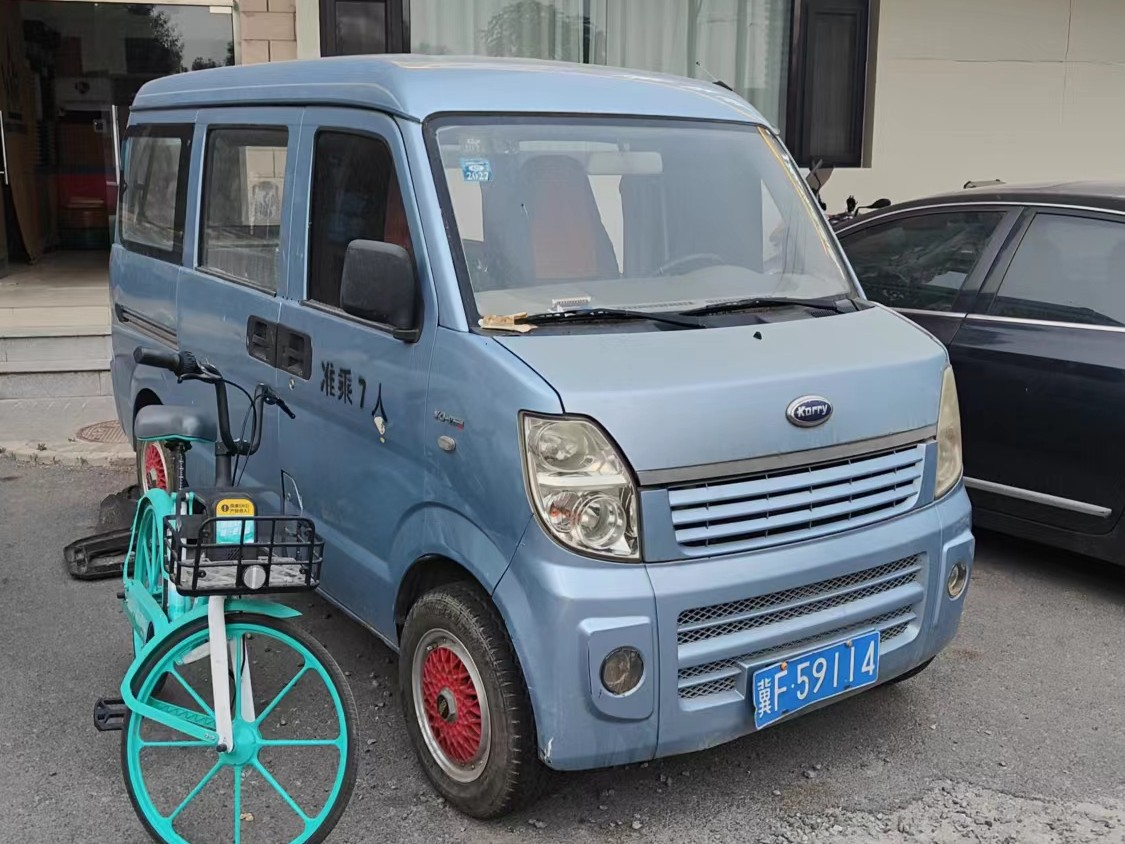
- Karry Yousheng

Overview
- Manufacturer: Karry (Chery)
- Also called: Chery Q21D; Karry Youpai; Karry Yousheng (long version)
- Production: 2009–2014
- Model years: 2009–2014
- Assembly: Wuhu Anhui, China

Body and chassis
- Class: Compact MPV
- Body style: 5-door wagon
- Layout: Front mid-engine, rear-wheel-drive layout

Powertrain
- Engine: 1.1L I4 petrol; 1.0L I4 petrol
- Transmission: 5-speed manual

Dimensions
- Wheelbase: 2,400 mm (94.5 in); 2,800 mm (110.2 in)(extended edition)
- Length: 3,436 mm (135.3 in); 4,430 mm (174.4 in)(extended edition)
- Width: 1,481 mm (58.3 in); 1,626 mm (64.0 in)(extended edition)
- Height: 1,875 mm (73.8 in); 1,930 mm (76.0 in)(extended edition)

The Chery Q21 or Karry Youpai (优派) and Chery Q21D or Karry Yousheng (优胜) is a commercial minivan produced by Karry (开瑞汽车), a sub-brand of the Chery brand for making commercial vans, trucks, SUVs, and mini-MPV's, which are mostly sold in third and fourth-tier cities and the countryside in China.

== Overview ==
The original Chery Q21 was launched in 2009 and was sold under the Karry brand as the Karry Youpai (优派), and a long wheelbase version called the Chery Q21D was also sold under the Karry brand as the Karry Yousheng (优胜).

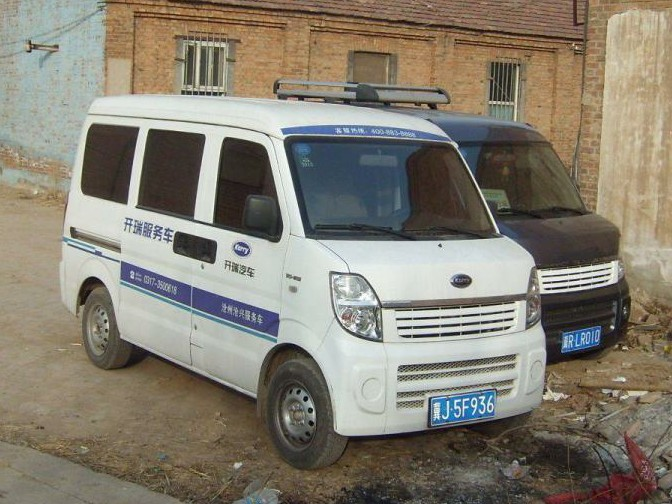
Karry Yousheng service van (left) and Karry Youpai (right)

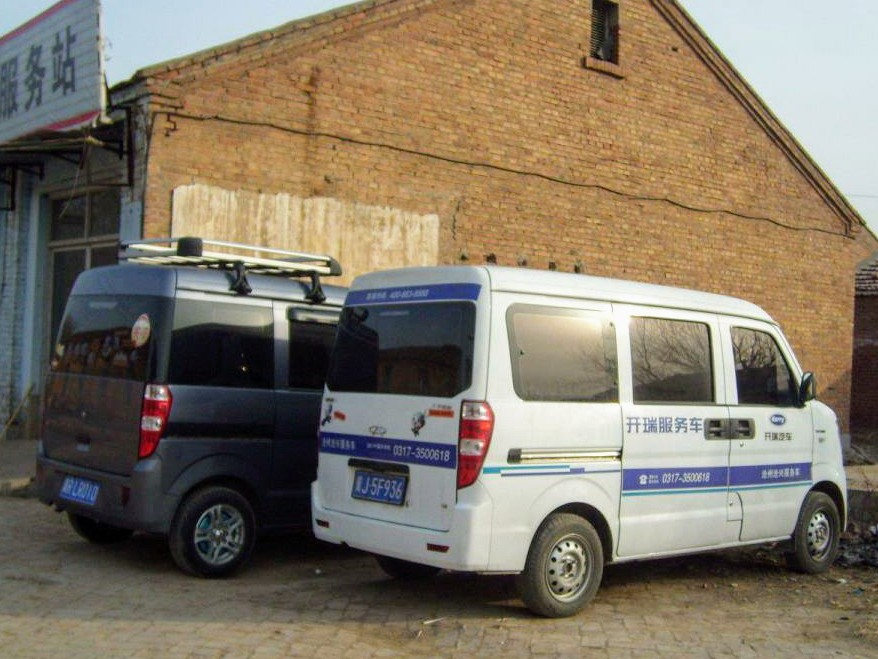
Karry Youpai (left) and Karry Yousheng service van (right)

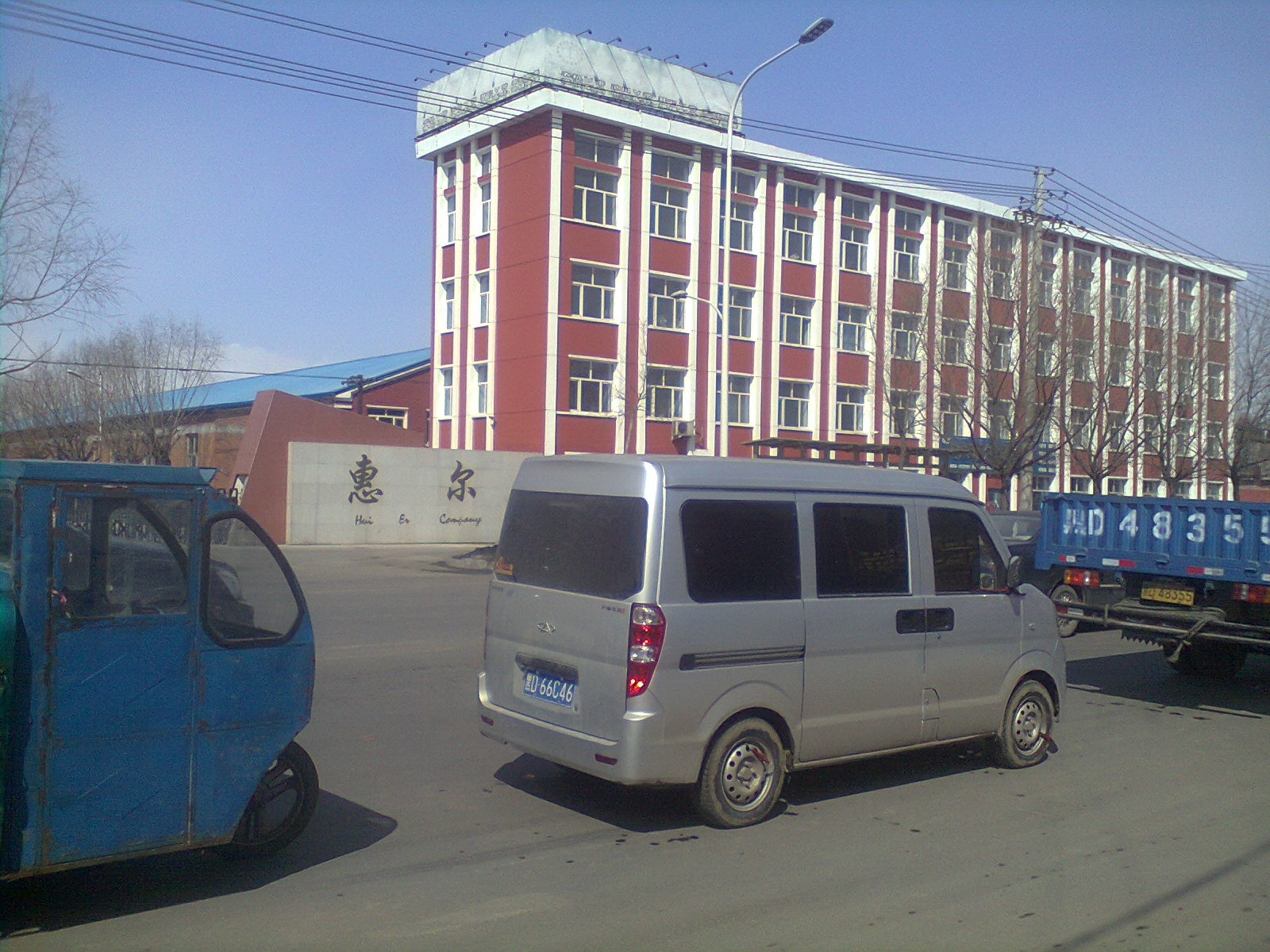
Karry Yousheng rear

=== Karry Yousheng II ===
A facelift variant featuring a restyled front end was launched in 2010 dubbed the second generation Karry Yousheng.

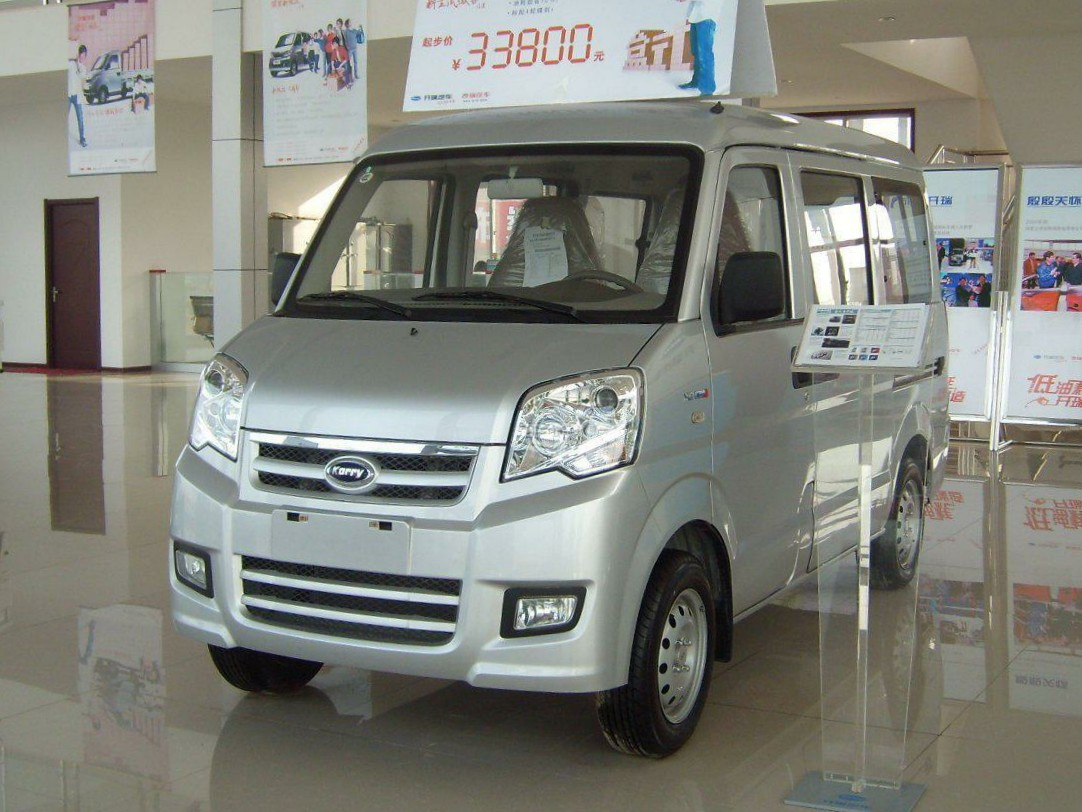
Karry Yousheng II

== See also ==
- Chery
