= Karry =

Chinese automobile manufacturing company

Karry New Energy Holdings Co., Ltd.
- Type: Subsidiary
- Industry: Automotive
- Founded: 2009; 17 years ago
- Headquarters: Wuhu, Anhui, China
- Area served: China
- Products: Light commercial vehicle Automobiles
- Owner: Chery Commercial Vehicle
- Website: www.mykarry.com (in Chinese)

Karry New Energy Holdings Co., Ltd. (traded as Karry) is a Chinese car manufacturer founded by Chery Automobile in 2009 specializing in the production of light commercial vehicles based in Anhui, Wuhu in China. It is a subsidiary of Chery Commercial Vehicle (Anhui) Co. Ltd. Following the IPO of Chery Automobile in 2025, the Karry and Chery Commercial Vehicle has been spun off and operated independently by Chery Holding Group, which has no capital ties with Chery Automobile anymore.

== History ==
=== Karry Auto ===
In 2007, Chery Automobile began expanding its offer with commercial and delivery vehicles, starting with the compact kombivan Chery Karry based on the passenger model Fengyun. In the same year, another, smaller model was introduced in the form of a compact, Chery V2 passenger van. Two years later, in 2009, Chery Automobile separated three new brands from its existing offer, one of them was Karry Auto, dedicated exclusively to commercial and passenger cars. Chery Karry was renamed to Karry Youyi, Chery V2 to Karry Youya, and in parallel with the debut of the brand, its portfolio was expanded by another model - Youpai/Yousheng. At the end of 2009, Karry's offer consisted of 4 models, thanks to the premiere of another one in the form of the Youyou van.

In the second decade of the 21st century, the Karry range diversified its offer with other types of cars, presenting in 2012 a cheap pickup truck Karry Aika, and in the compact minivan Karry K50. A year later, the range was expanded by another new type of car in the form of a crossover based on the K50, the Karry K60. At the turn of the second and third decade of the 21st century, the last combustion Karra models debuted: in 2019, the Youjin T7 pickup line was introduced, and in 2022 - model X6. Just two years later, all combustion models disappeared from the Karry range and the company focused exclusively on electric drives.

=== Karry New Energy ===
In 2017, Chery Commercial Vehicle established a new division, Karry New Energy, which focused on producing electric variants of the Karry models, starting with the K60 EV. A year later, the electric van Youyou EV went on sale, while in 2019 the first model built from scratch was presented with electric drive in mind - delivery vans Karry Dolphin. In 2022, in parallel with the premiere of the X6 model, its variant van was also presented exclusively with electric drive, Karry Porpoise and an electric variant of the pickup truck - Elephant. The three latest Karry New Energy models will become the only remaining products in the range after the company switches to fully electric drive in 2024.

== Products ==
=== Current models ===
Image	Name	Chinese name	Introduction (cal. year)	Gen	Description
Van
	Dolphin	海豚	2019	1st	Van, BEV
	Porpoise E5/E6/E7	江豚	2022	1st	Van, BEV
Truck
	Little Elephant	小象	2022	1st	Truck variant of Porpoise
	Lingmi	零米	2024	1st	Light truck

=== Discontinued vehicles ===
Image	Name	Chinese name(s)	Also called	Introduction (cal. year)	End of production (cal. year)	Gen	Class
Minivan/Van
	Youyi	优翼	Chery A18	2007	2011	1st	Compact van/MPV
	Youpai/ Yousheng	优派/ 优胜	Chery Q21; Chery Q21D	2011	2014	1st	Compact van/MPV
	Youyou	优优	Karry Q22; Chery Q22; Chery Yo-Yo; Chery Awin	2007	2022	1st	Compact van/MPV
	Youya	优雅	Chery V2; Karry V2; Karry S22	2010	2015	2nd	Compact van/MPV
	K50	K50	–	2015	2017	1st	Compact van/MPV
	K60	K60	Chery K60; Cowin V3	2016	2025	1st	Compact MPV
Pickup truck
	Aika	爱卡	Chery Aika	2012	2017	1st	Pick up truck
	Higgo	杰虎	–	2015	2017	1st	Pick up truck
	X6	X6	–	2022	2024	1st	Micro truck
	Youjin	优劲	Chery Q22B; Chery TransCab; Chery Awin	2007	2022	1st	Pickup truck
Light truck
	Lvka S	绿卡S	Karry Lvka S	2014	2017	1st	Light truck (premium)
	Lvka C	绿卡C	Karry Lvka C	2014	2017	1st	Light truck (mainstream)
	Lvka T	绿卡T	Karry Lvka T	2014	2017	1st	Light truck (entry level)

== See also ==
- List of automobile manufacturers of China
