= USS Porpoise =

USS Porpoise has been the name of more than one United States navy ship, and may refer to:

- USS Porpoise (1820), a schooner built in 1820 and wrecked in 1833
- USS Porpoise (1836), a brig in commission from 1836 to 1847, from 1848 to 1852, and from 1853 until lost in 1854
- USS Porpoise (SS-7), a submarine in commission from 1903 to 1919, renamed USS A-6 in 1911
- USS Porpoise (YFB-2047), steamer in commission from 1918 to 1930, originally named USS Moosehead (ID-2047)
- USS Porpoise (SS-172), a submarine in commission from 1935 to 1945
- USS Porpoise (SP-4), a patrol yacht acquired by the United States Navy in 1917.
