= Chery Q22 =

Commercial minivan

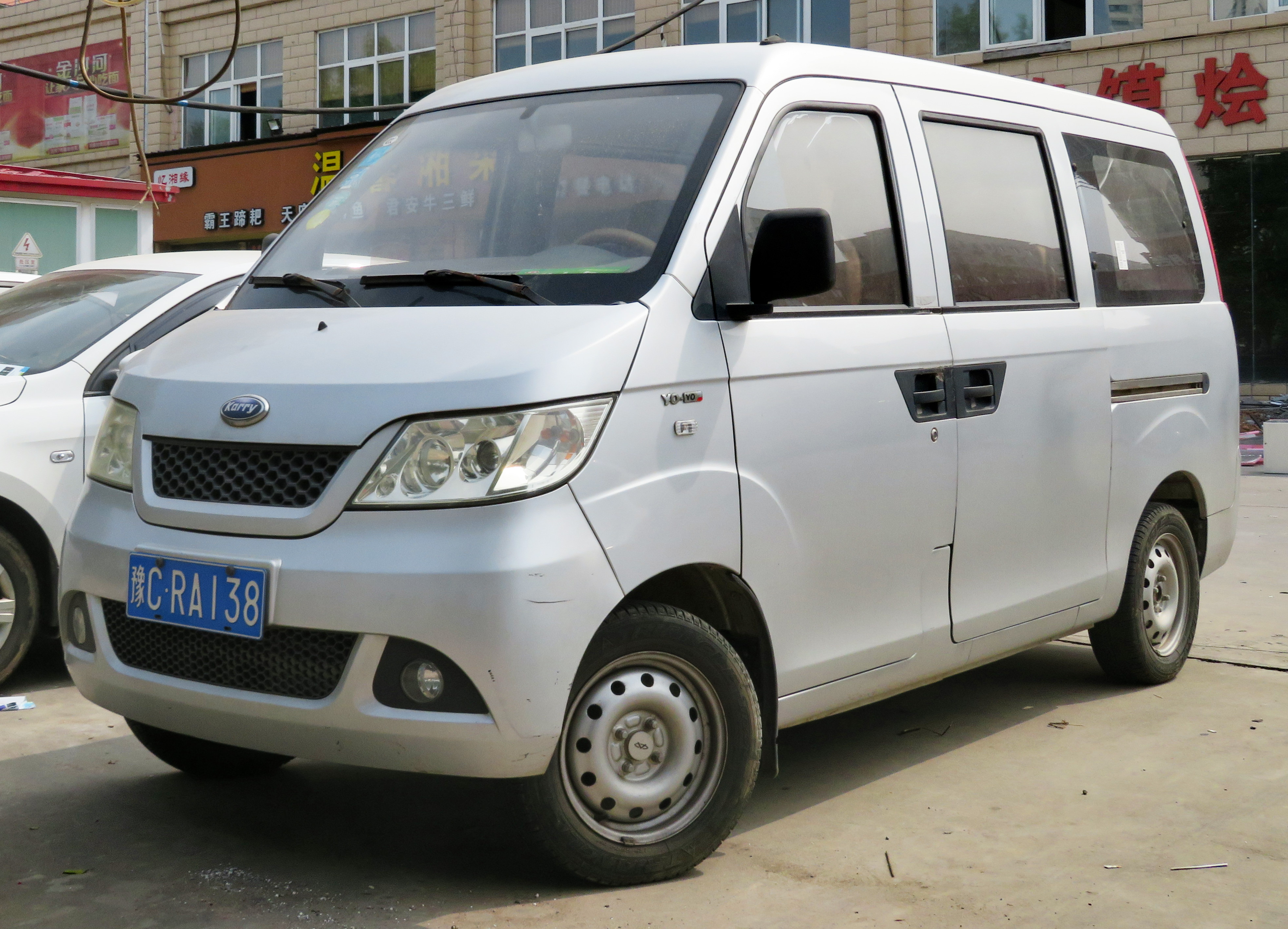
- Chery Q22 (Karry Youyou)

Overview
- Manufacturer: Karry (Chery)
- Also called: Chery TransCab (pickup; Indonesia); Chery Yo-Yo (van; Indonesia); Chery Awin (Taiwan); Karry Youyou; Karry UU; Karry Youjin T5 (pickup); Red Star V2; Yangtse WG5031XXYBEV (Electric Delivery Van); Skywell D08
- Production: 2009–2022
- Assembly: Wuhu Anhui, China; Taichung, Taiwan

Body and chassis
- Class: Compact MPV; minitruck
- Body style: 5-door wagon (Youyou); 2-door truck (Youjin)
- Layout: Front mid-engine, rear-wheel-drive layout

Powertrain
- Engine: Petrol: 1.0 L I4; 1.1 L I4; 1.2 L I4
- Transmission: 5-speed manual

Dimensions
- Wheelbase: 2,600 mm (102.4 in); 2,800 mm (110.2 in) (Q22L)
- Length: 4,015 mm (158.1 in); 4,430 mm (174.4 in) (Q22L)
- Width: 1,607 mm (63.3 in); 1,626 mm (64.0 in) (Q22L)
- Height: 1,908 mm (75.1 in); 1,930 mm (76.0 in) (Q22L)

The Chery Q22 or Karry Youyou (UU, 优优) is a commercial minivan produced by Karry, a sub-brand of the Group Chery Holding brand for making commercial vans, trucks, SUVs, and mini-MPV's, which are mostly sold in third and fourth-tier cities and the countryside in China.

== Overview ==
The original Karry Youyou was launched in 2007, and a long wheelbase version called the Chery Karry Youyou extended edition was later launched in 2012 and by 2018 only the extended edition remains on sale. The power of the Youyou extended edition comes from a 1.2 liter engine that produces 50kW and 90 nm. The top speed is 120 km/h. Prices of the original Karry Youyou ranges from 34,500 yuan to 46,400 yuan.

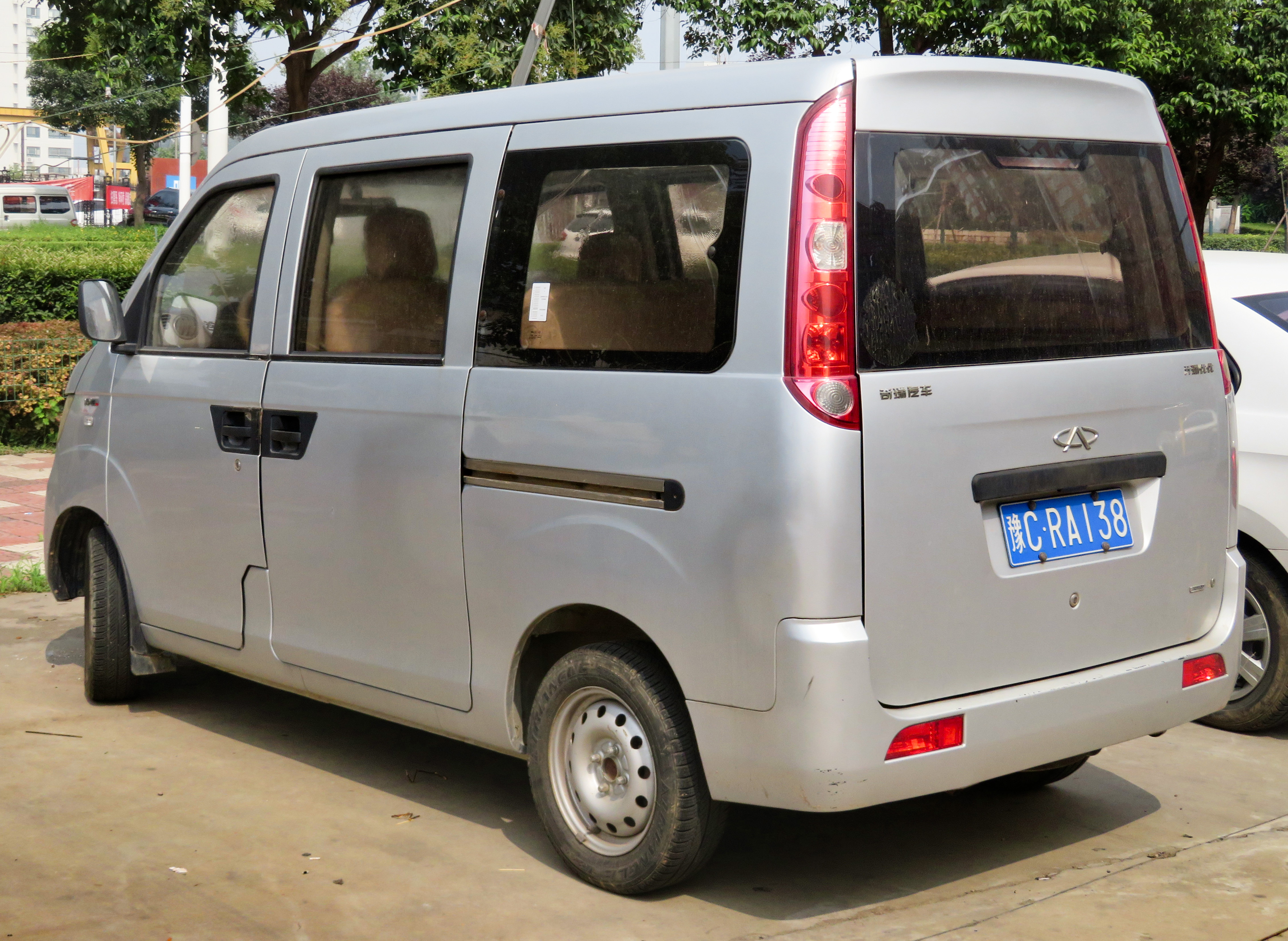
Chery Q22 (Karry Youyou) rear

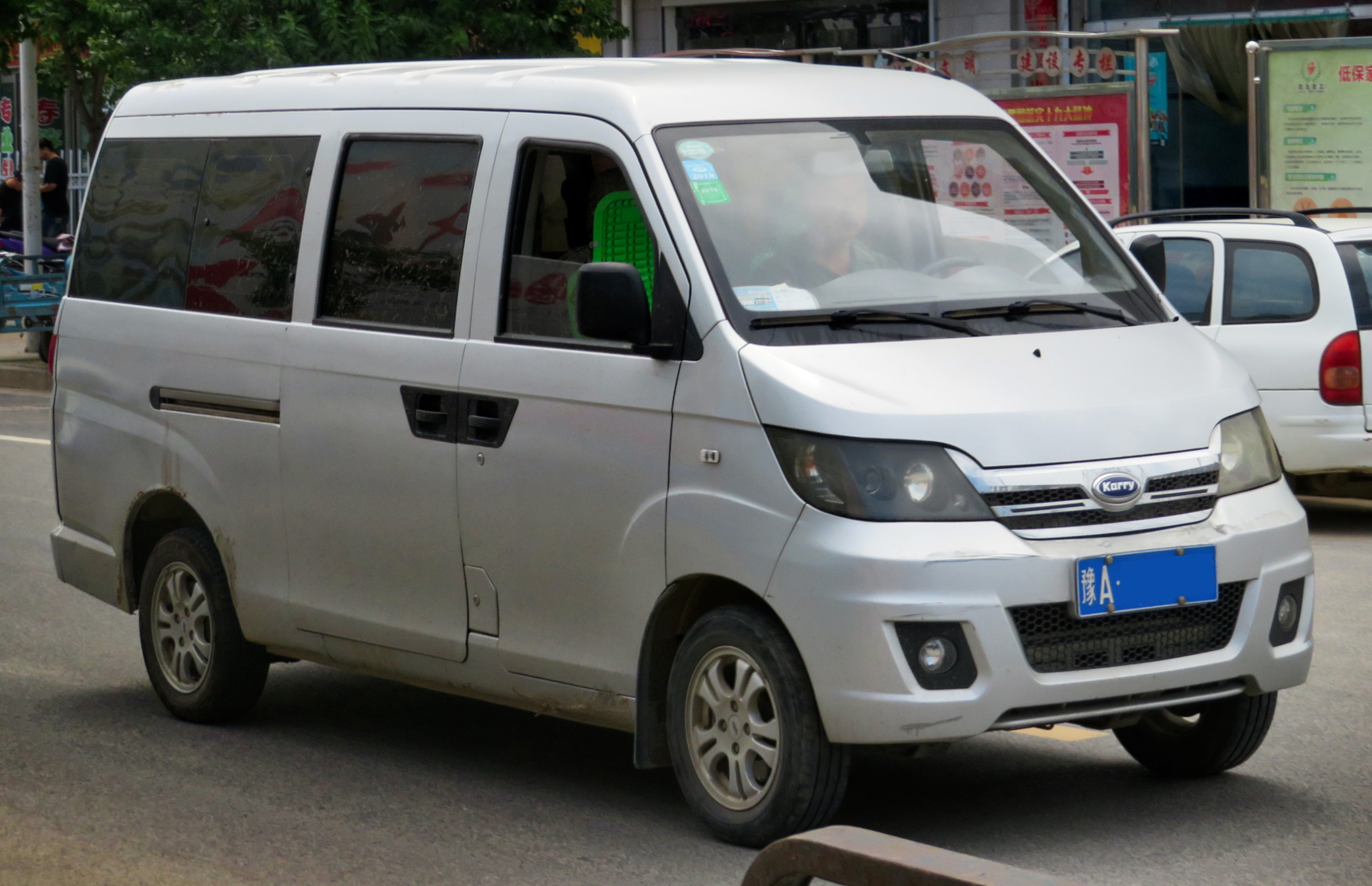
Karry Youyou II Q22L (extended cab)

=== Youjin T5/ T7 ===
As of November 2020, a pickup based on the Youyou called the Youjin T5 was launched. The T5 single cab model has a cargo bed length of 3200mm and a wheelbase of 3285mm, and the complete bed measures 5.22 square meters. The T5 crew cab model has a 2500mm long cargo bed. The updated Youjin T5 features a reinforced 2 by 13 chassis frame structure. The cargo bed is 810mm above the ground and the foot step is 550mm above the ground. The Youjin T5 is powered by a 1.5 liter inline-4 engine code named DAM15KR. The engine produces a maximum horsepower of 116 hp and 150N·m mated to a 5-speed manual transmission.

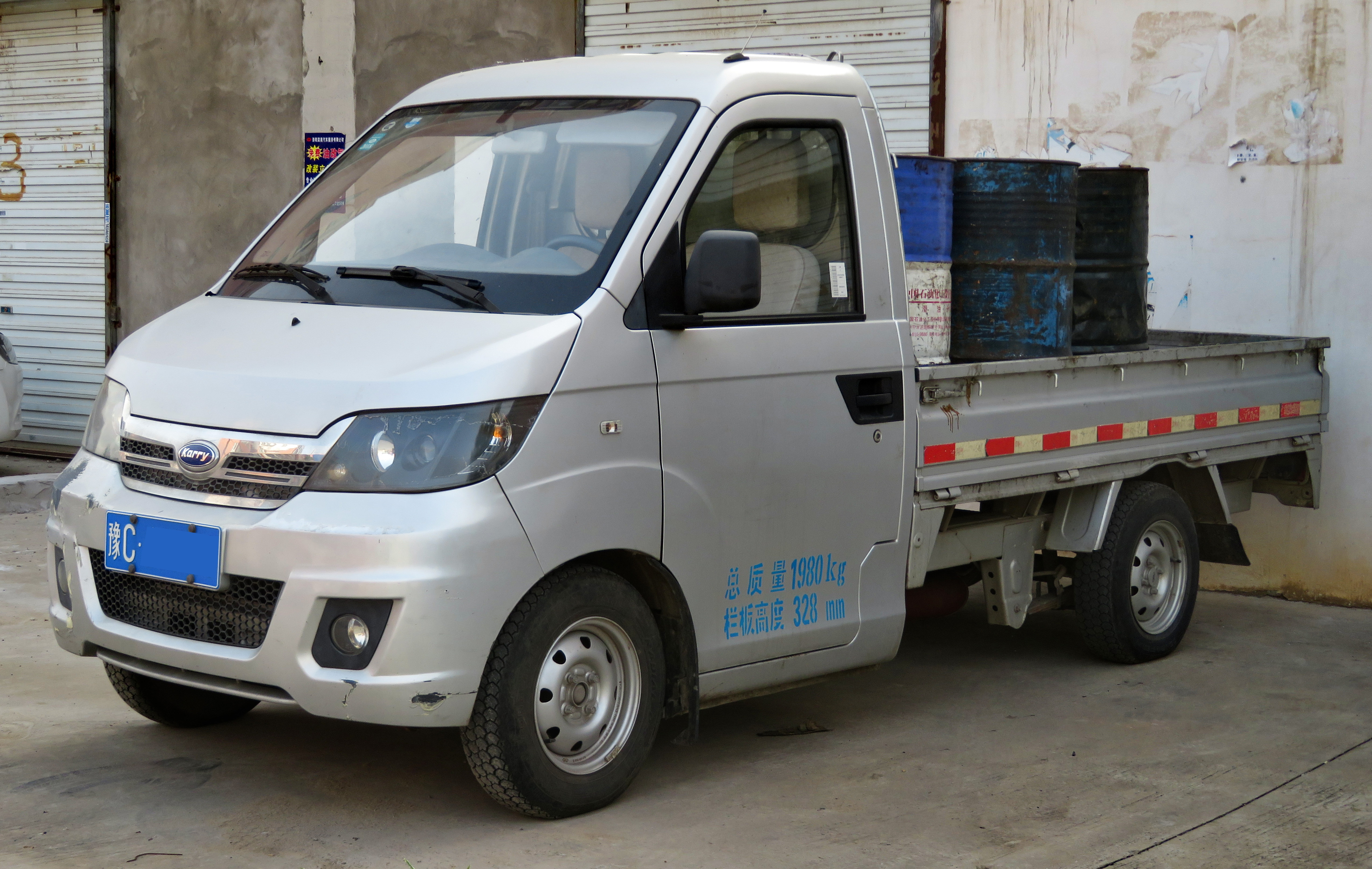
Chery Karry Youjin single cab

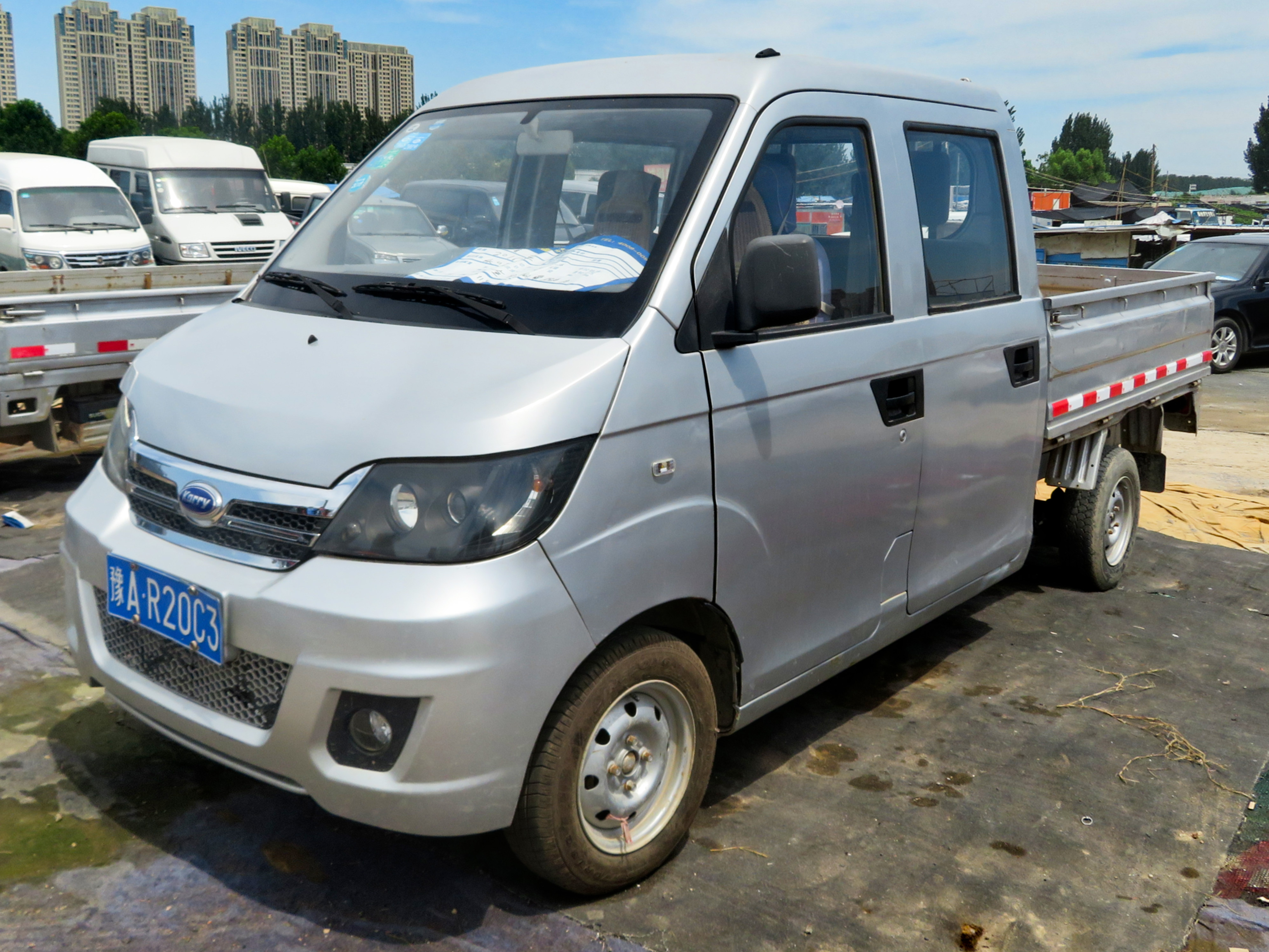
Chery Karry Youjin double cab

== Karry Youyou EV/ Youjin EV ==
The Karry Youyou EV is the electric delivery van version of the Chery Karry Youyou extended edition in China, while the Youjin EV is the electric pickup variant. The Youyou EV is powered by the HLTZ220XS electric motor producing 82 hp and 180N·m. The battery of the Youyou EV is a 34kWh battery or a 40kWh battery with a range of 260 km and 228 km respectively. The suspension is front Mcpherson suspension and rear leaf spring setup. The powertrain layout is MR layout. The 40kWh battery is standard on all Youjin EV models.

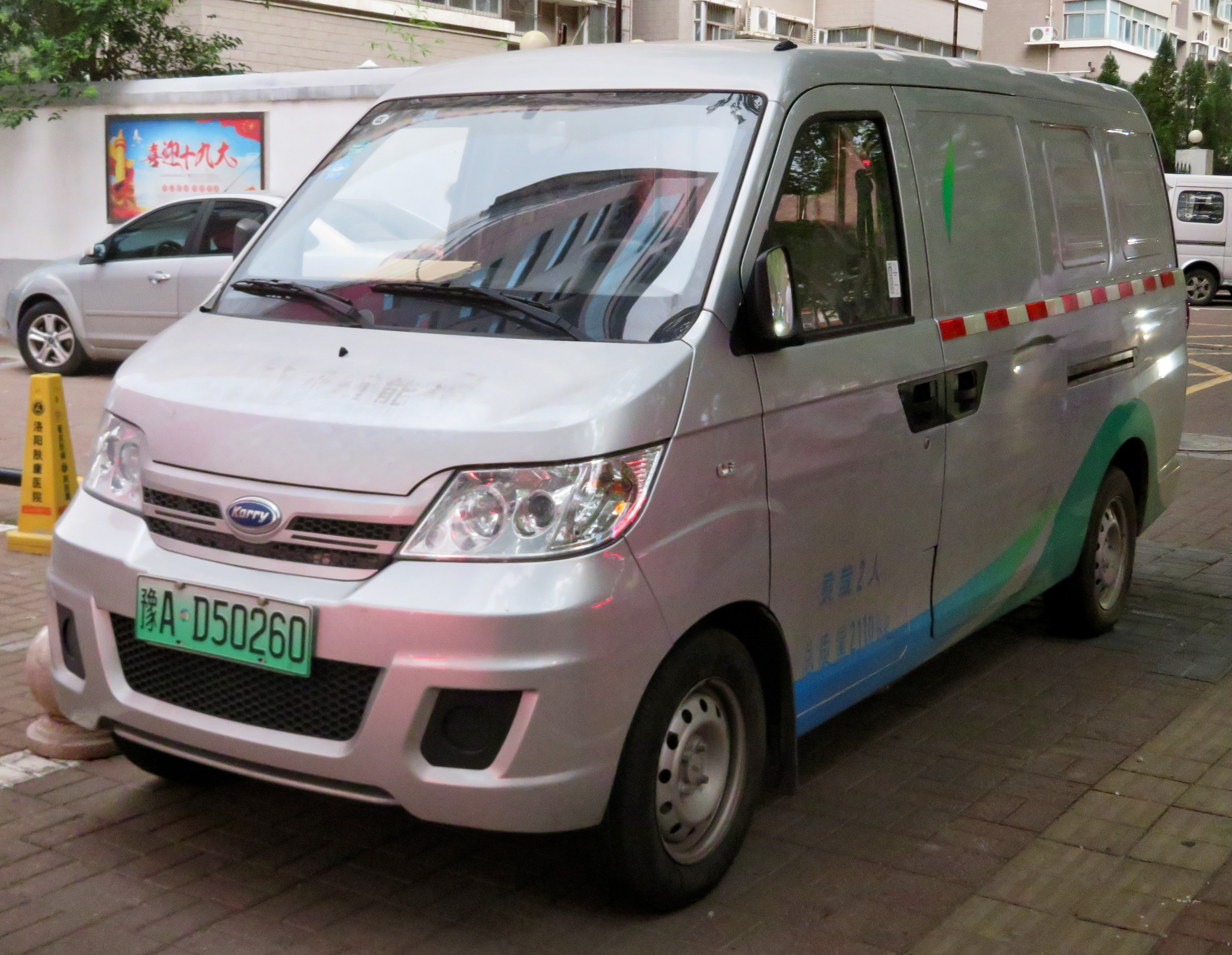
Chery Karry Youyou EV front

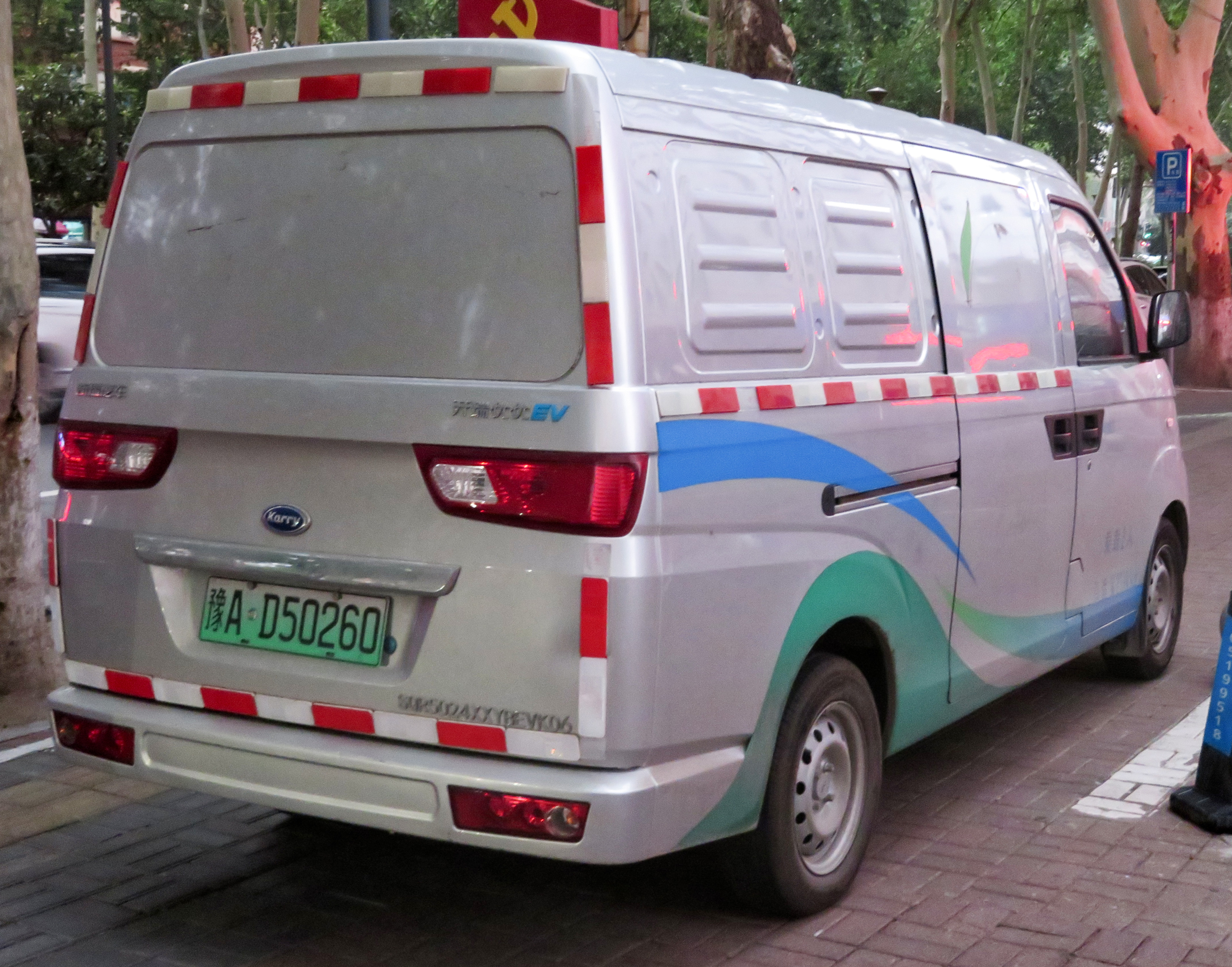
Chery Karry Youyou EV rear

=== Yangtse WG5031XXYBEV ===
The Yangtse WG5031XXYBEV is a license-built electric delivery van based on the Chery Karry Youyou extended edition in China. The Yangtse WG5031XXYBEV was built sold under the Yangtse (扬子江) brand.

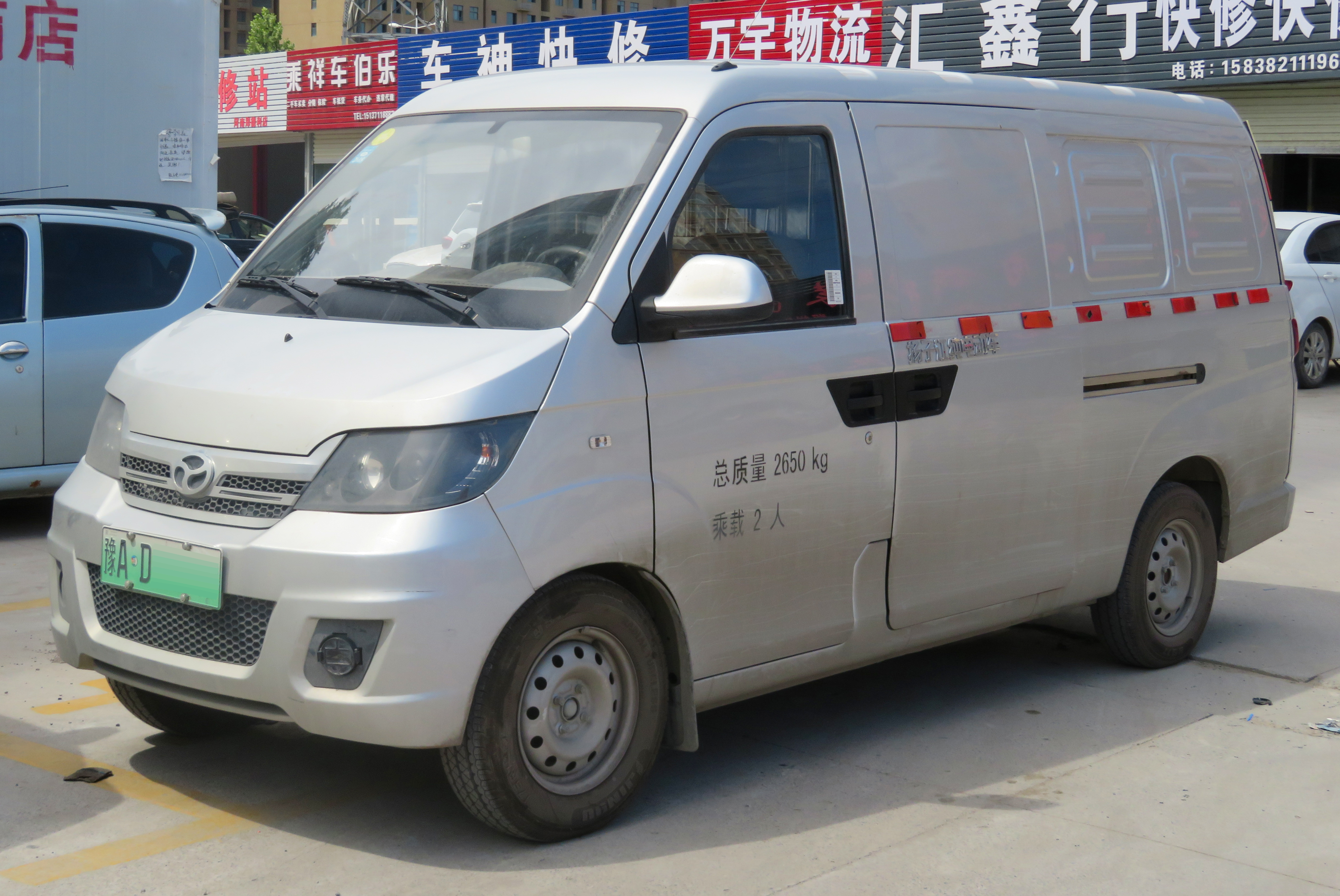
Yangtse WG5031XXYBEV front

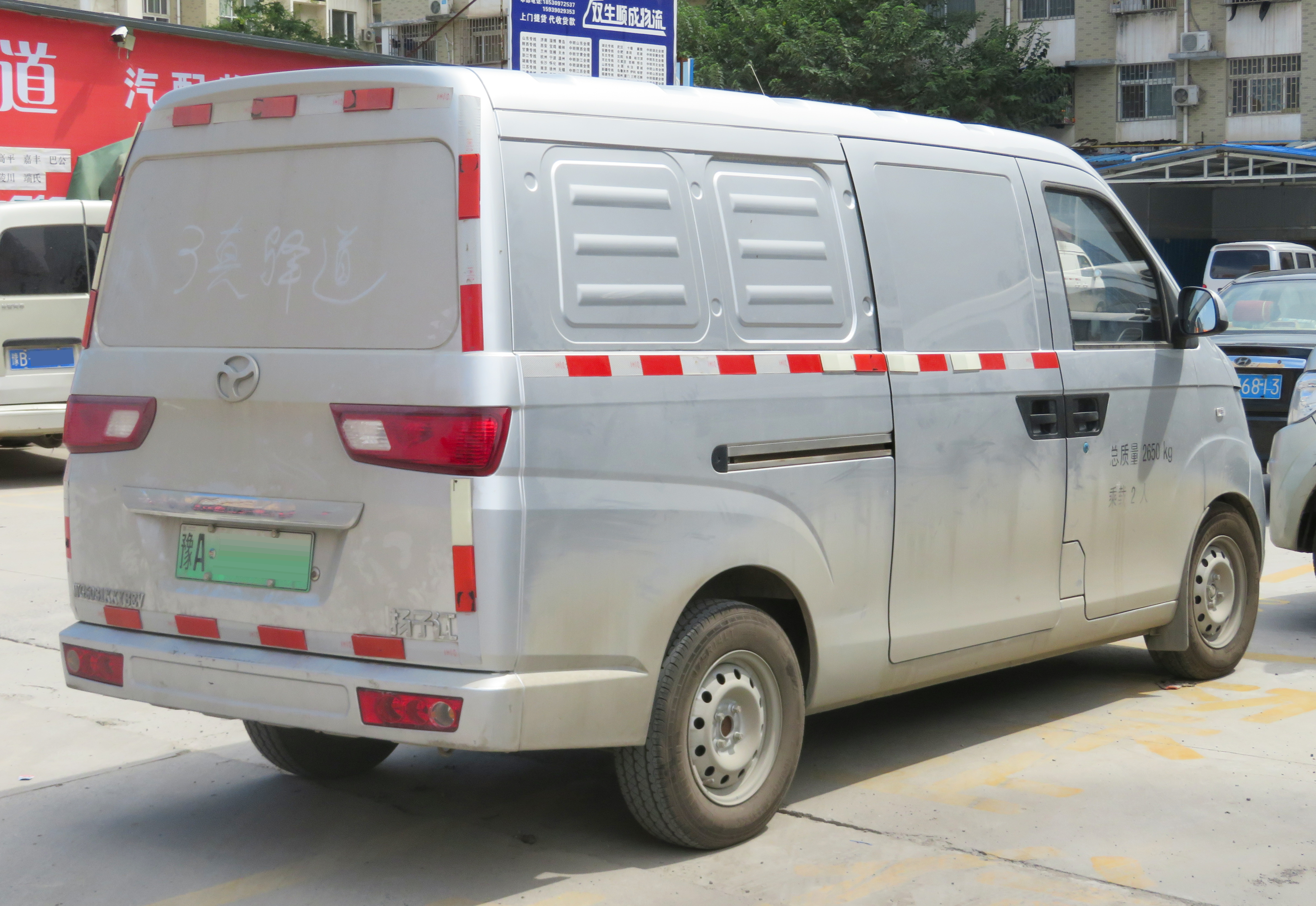
Yangtse WG5031XXYBEV rear

== Safety ==
ASEAN NCAP test results Chery Transcab (2017)
| Test | Points |
|---|---|
| Overall: | 0 /5 stars |
| Adult occupant: | 17.04 |
| Child occupant: | NA |
| Safety assist: | 0.00 |

== See also ==
- Chery
