= Karry Youyi =

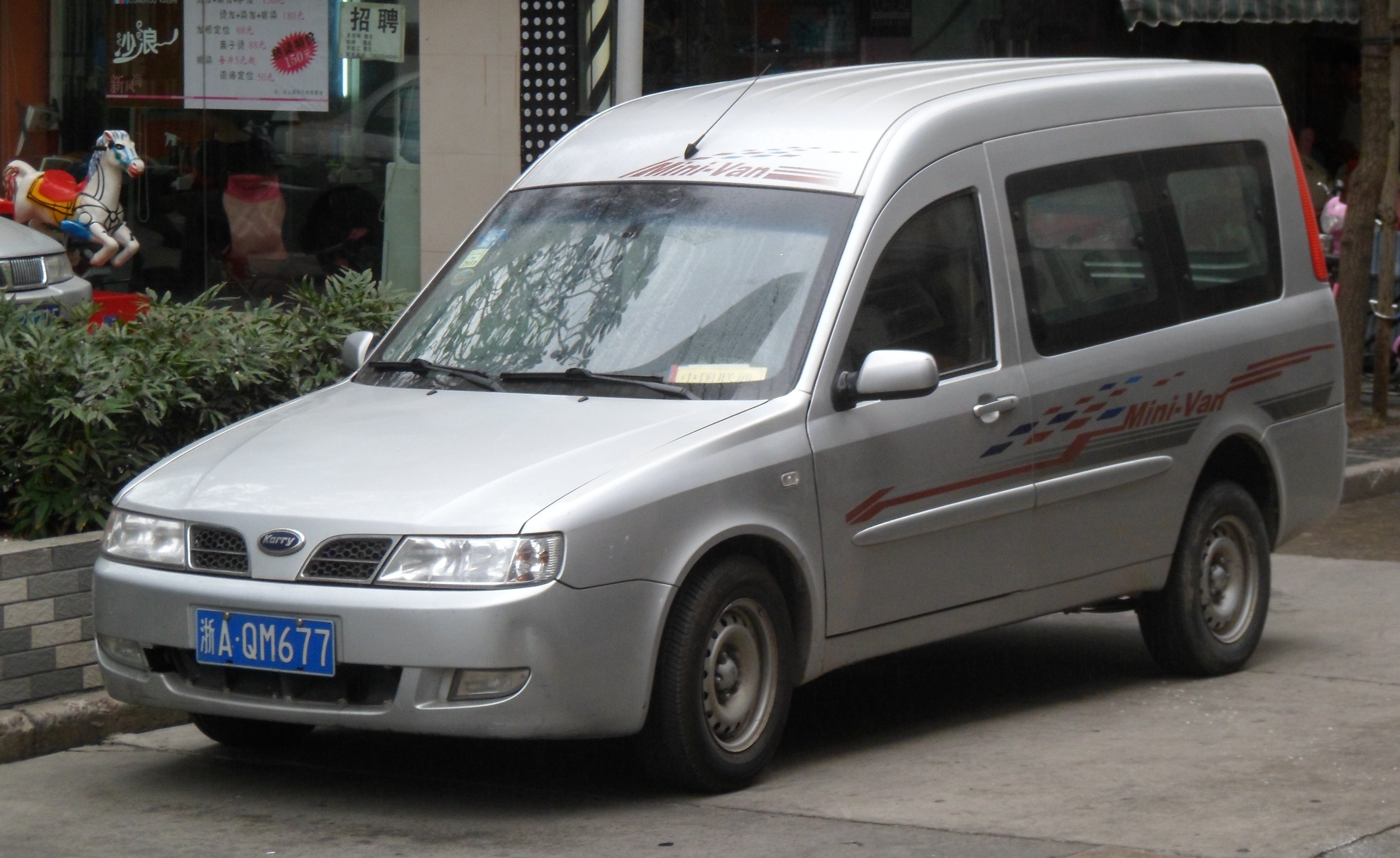

Overview
- Manufacturer: Karry (Chery)
- Also called: Chery A18; Chery Taxim (Turkey)
- Production: 2007–2011
- Assembly: Anhui, China

Body and chassis
- Layout: Front engine, front wheel drive

Powertrain
- Engine: 1.6 L SOHC I4; 1.5 L SQR477F SOHC I4
- Transmission: 5-speed manual

Dimensions
- Wheelbase: 2,700 mm (106.3 in)
- Length: 4,610 mm (181.5 in)
- Width: 1,693 mm (66.7 in)
- Height: 1,855 mm (73.0 in)

The Karry Youyi (优翼) or Chery A18 is an out of production MPV produced by Chery under the Karry brand, Chery's commercial vehicle division.

== Overview ==
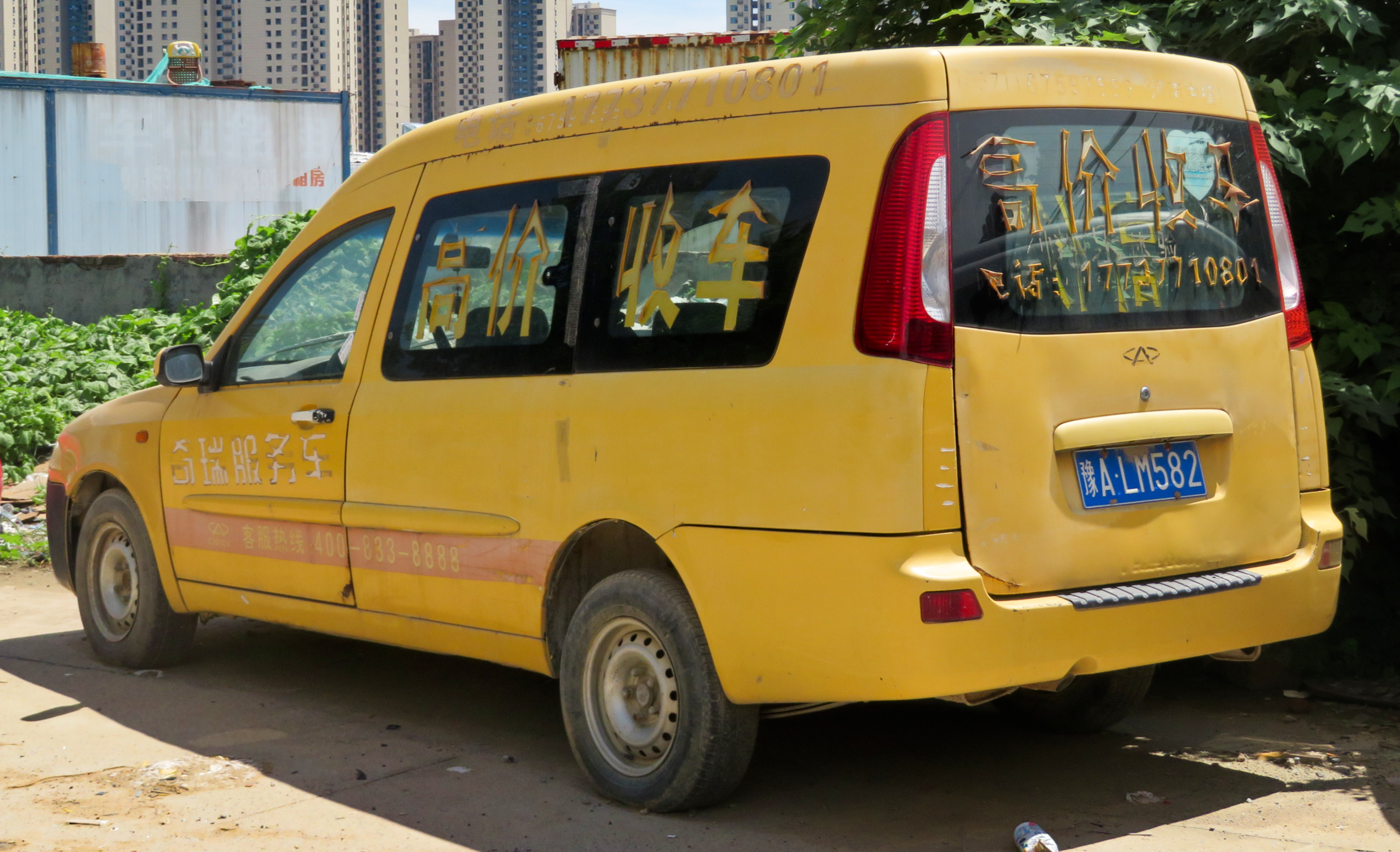
2007 Chery Karry (K315), rear

The Chery A18 at launch is a compact MPV based on the SEAT Toledo based Chery Fulwin. The vehicle features MacPherson independent suspension on the front and rear Leaf coils. The powertrain is front wheel drive only and the engine is a 1.5 liter 4-Cylinder 16-Valve SOHC engine, with an additional 1.6 liter SOHC engine for the models sold in China as of 2007.

Since it was launched in 2007 as Chery A18 or Chery Karry, the MPV has experienced poor sales due to its lack of functions and bad quality, both the exterior and interior. The Karry name was later developed into an individual sub-brand for commercial vehicles under Chery.
