= Porpoise-class submarine =

Porpoise class submarine can refer to:

- Grampus-class submarine, six British submarines launched in the 1930s, sometimes called the Porpoise class
- British Porpoise-class submarine, eight submarines launched in the 1950s
- United States Porpoise-class submarine, ten submarines launched in the 1930s
