= S22 (RER Vaud) =

Railway in Switzerland

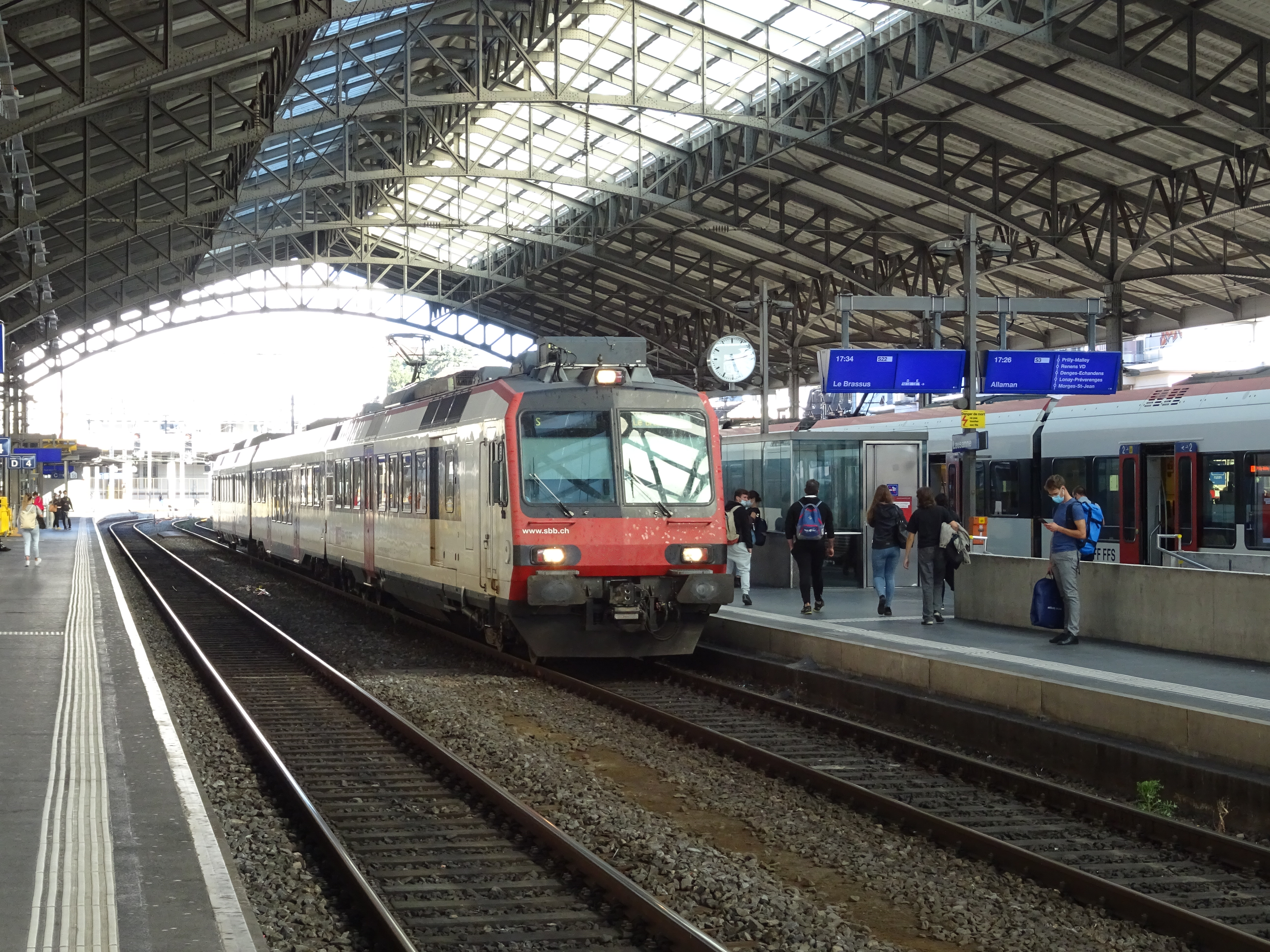
- A Le Brassus-bound S22 at Lausanne in 2021

Overview
- First service: 13 December 2020
- Last service: 10 December 2022
- Successor: S4
- Former operator(s): Swiss Federal Railways

Route
- Termini: Le Brassus; Lausanne
- Stops: 17
- Distance travelled: 70.4 kilometres (43.7 mi)
- Average journey time: 1 hour 30 minutes
- Service frequency: Rush-hour service
- Line(s) used: Vallorbe–Le Brassus line; Simplon line; Jura Foot Line

The S22 was a railway service of RER Vaud that provided rush-hour service between Lausanne and Le Brassus in the Swiss canton of Vaud. Swiss Federal Railways, the national railway company of Switzerland, operated the service.

== Operations ==
The S22 operated two trains in each direction per day. Two trains departed Le Brassus in the morning and returned from Lausanne in the early evening. At the time, this is the only through service between the two cities; regular service between Le Brassus and Vallorbe was provided by Travys, with a change to other RER Vaud services at Vallorbe or Le Day.

== History ==
SBB introduced the S22 with the December 2020 timetable change. The RER Vaud lines were substantially reorganized for the December 2022 timetable change. The "new" S4 replaced the S22, providing hourly service between Le Brassus and Aigle.
