= Karry Youya =

The Karry Youya is a compact MPV produced by Karry, a sub-brand of the Chery brand for making commercial vans, trucks, SUVs, and mini-MPV's, which are mostly sold in third and fourth-tier cities and the countryside in China. The first generation Karry Youya was launched in 2007, and was replaced by the second generation in 2012.

== First Generation ==
Karry Youya I
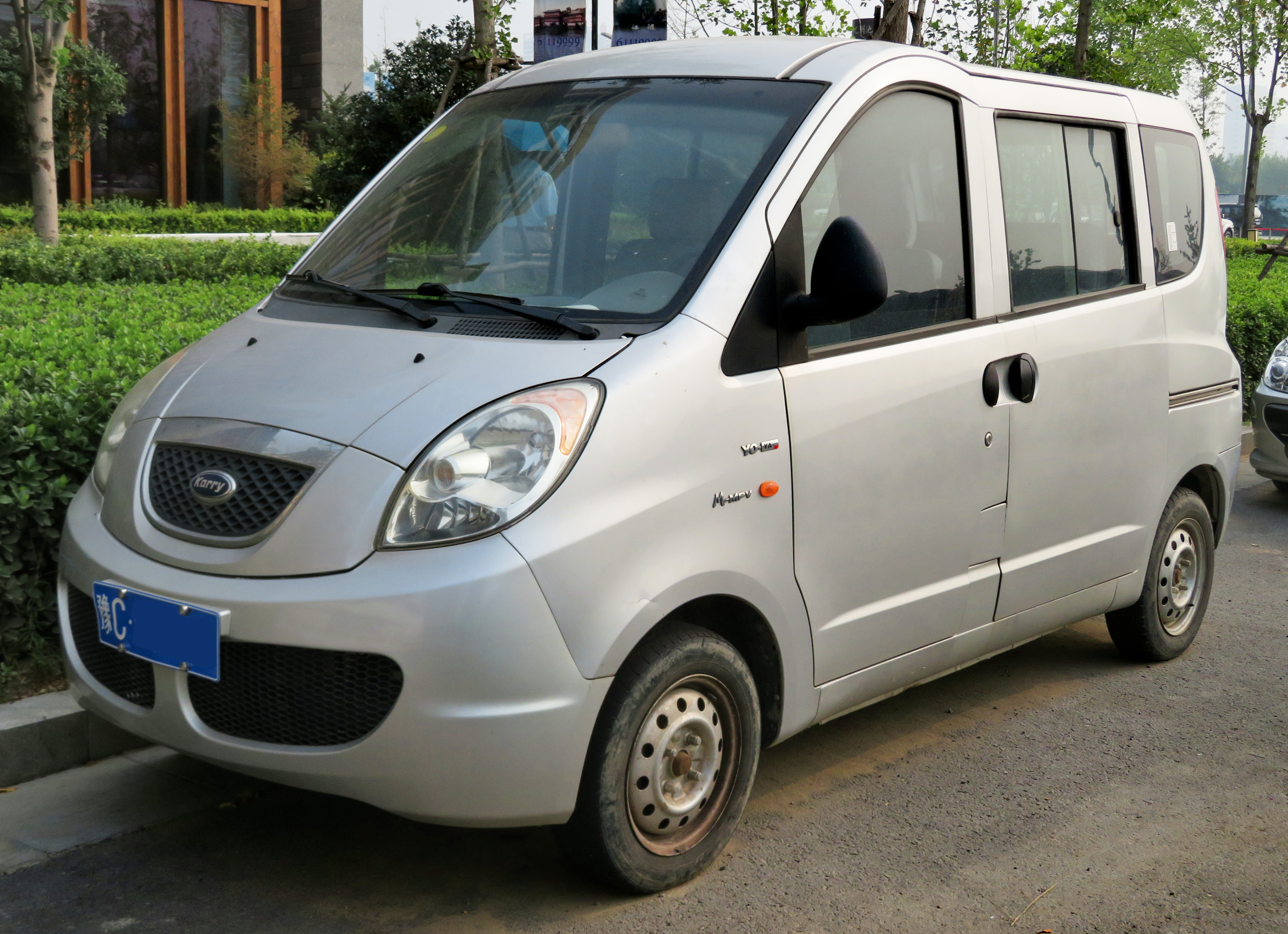

Overview
- Manufacturer: Karry (Chery)
- Also called: Chery V2; Karry V2; Karry S22
- Production: 2007–2012
- Model years: 2007–2012

Body and chassis
- Class: Compact MPV
- Body style: 5-door wagon

Powertrain
- Engine: 1.2L SQR472FC I4 petrol; 1.3L SQR473F I4 petrol; 1.5L SQRD4G15 I4 petrol
- Transmission: 5-speed manual

Chronology
- Successor: Karry Youya II

The first generation Karry Youya was launched at the 2007 Jilin motor show as Riich R2. As Chery launched the "Karry" brand in early 2009 for its commercial van and truck lines, the Riich R2 nameplate was changed to Karry Youya. An upgraded version was released in 2012, powered by a 1.2 liter (ACTECO-SQR472FC) engine or 1.3 liter (ACTECO-SQR473F) engine. The 2007-2014 first generation models were all built with a 2625mm wheelbase and are all 4040mm long.

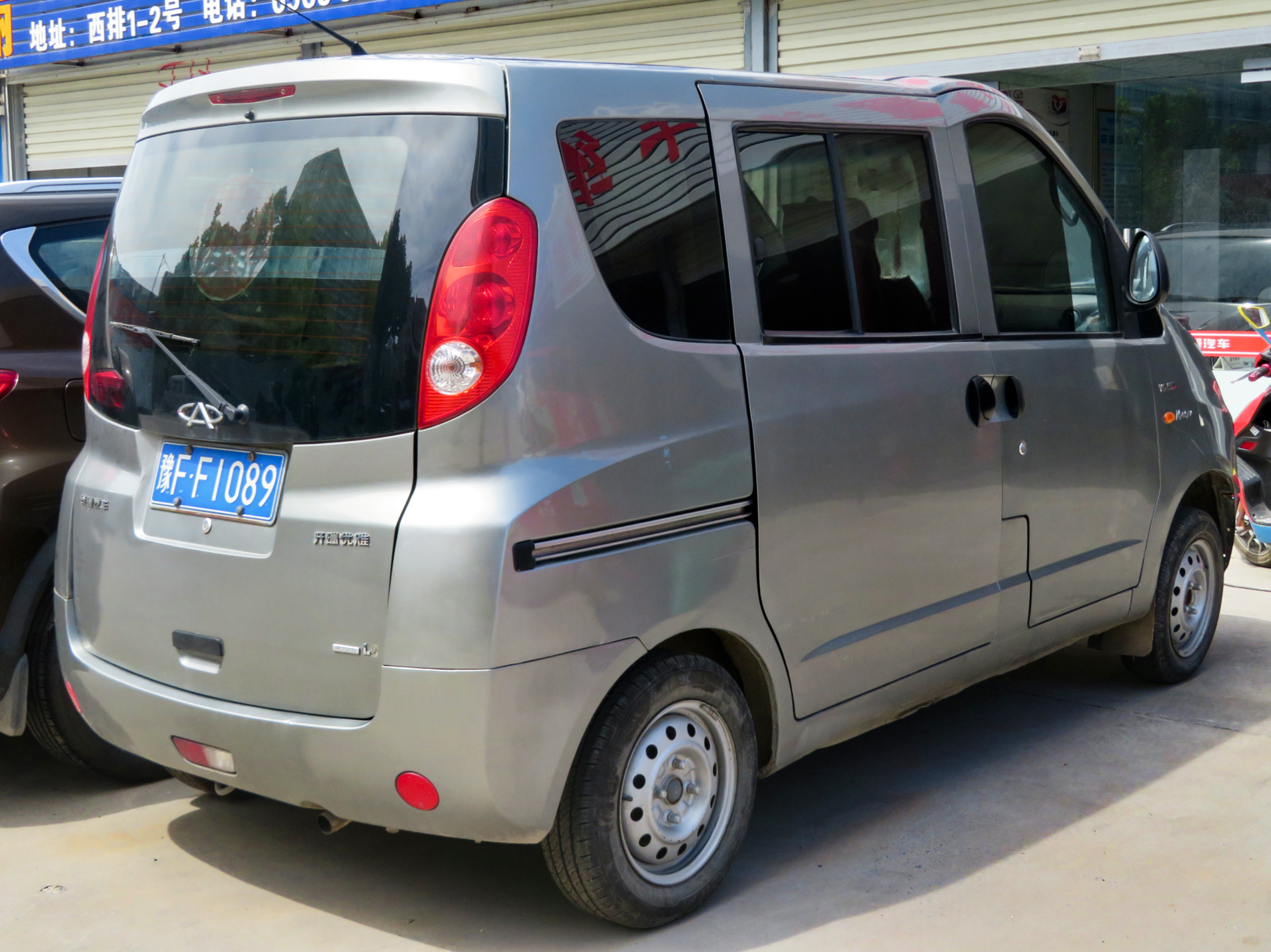
Karry Youya I rear

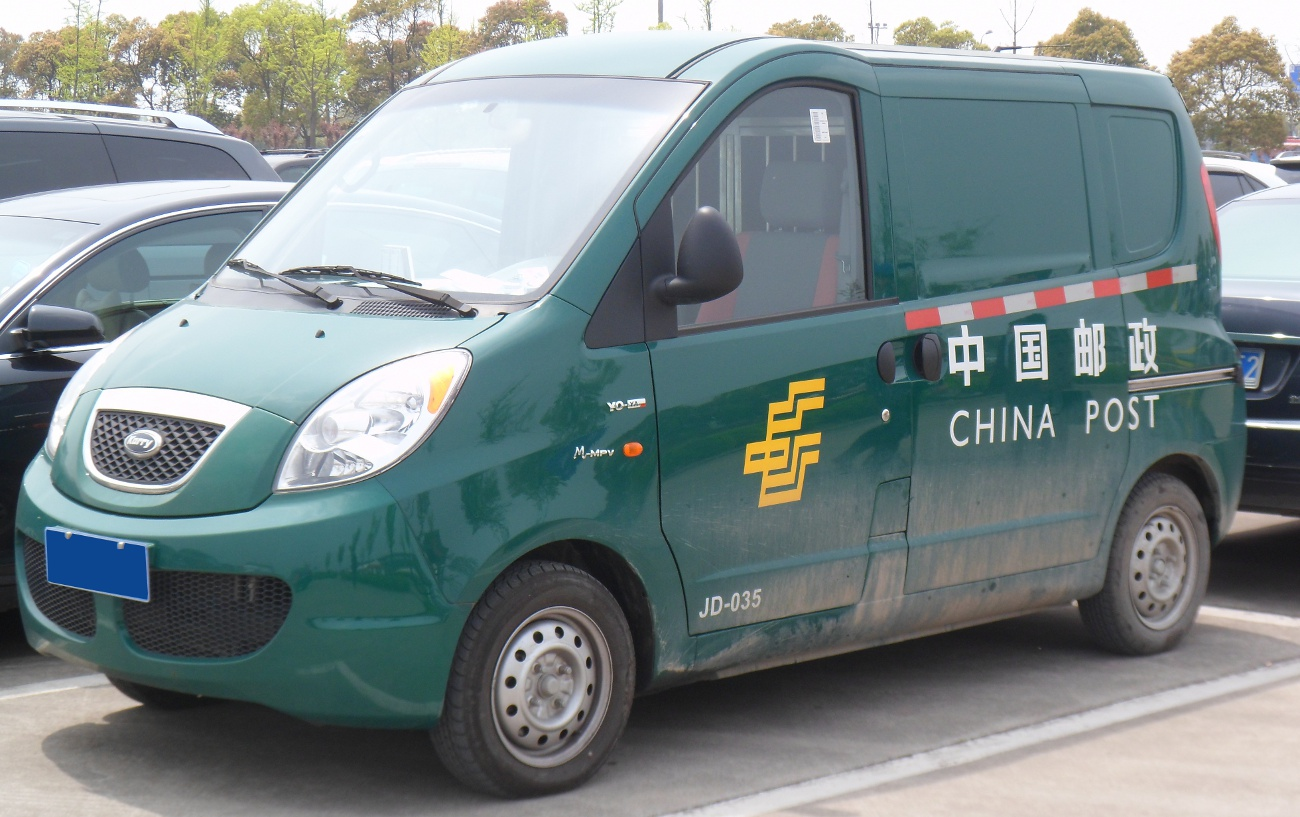
Karry Youya Chinese mail van

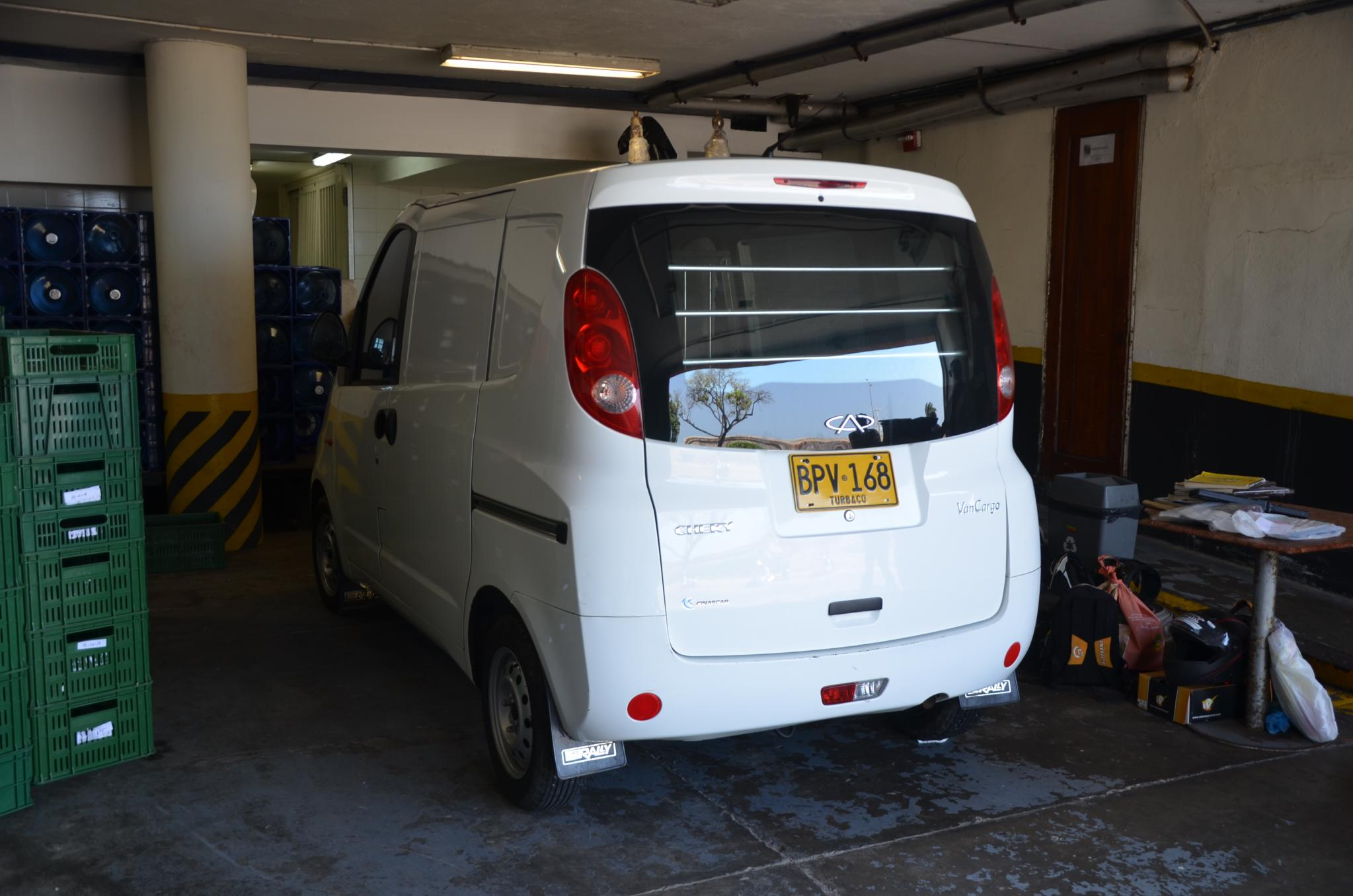
Chery V2 delivery van in Colombia

== Second Generation ==
Karry Youya II
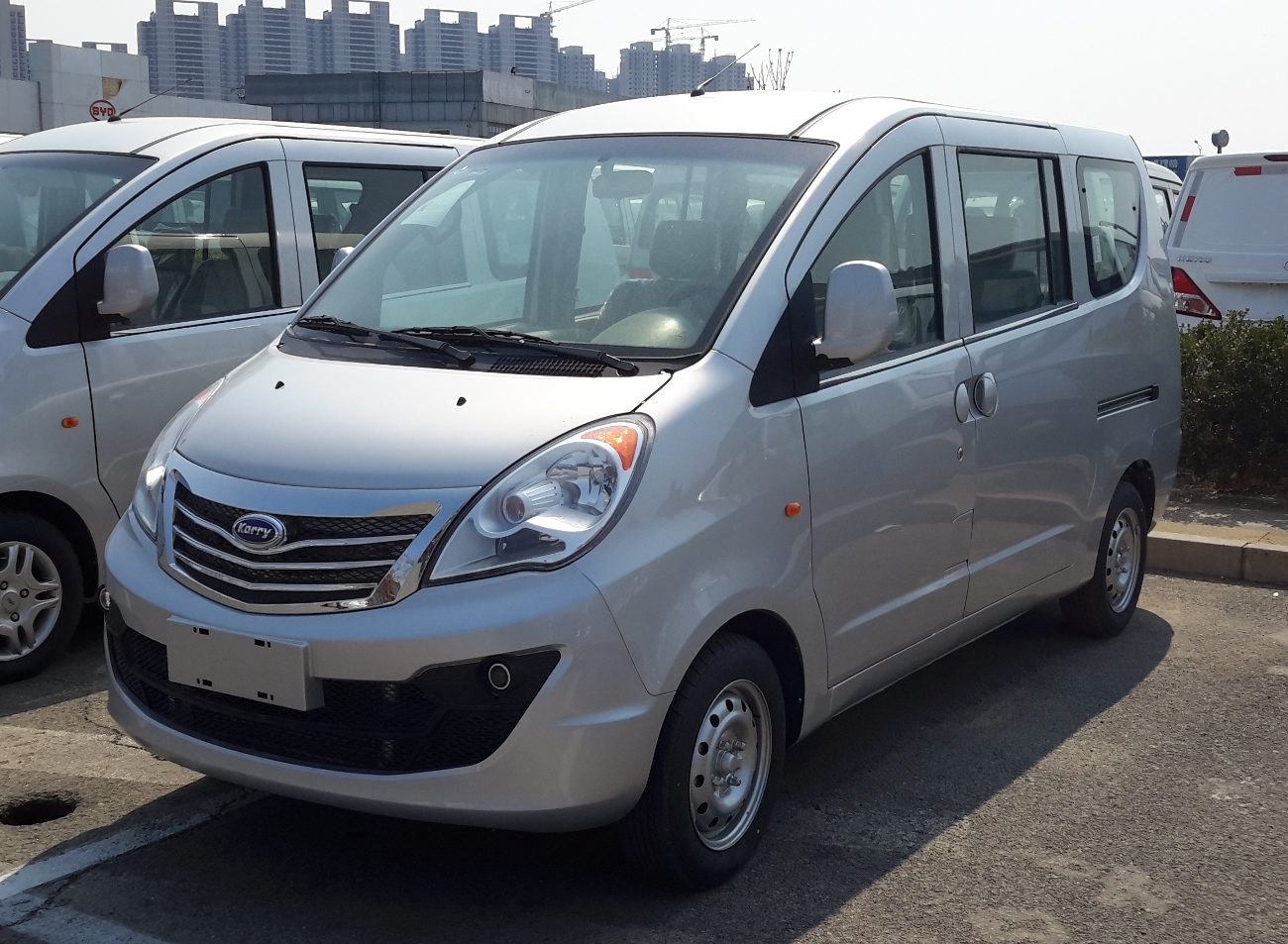

Overview
- Manufacturer: Chery
- Production: 2012–2016
- Model years: 2013–2016

Body and chassis
- Class: Compact MPV
- Body style: 5-door wagon

Powertrain
- Engine: 1.5L SQR477F I4 petrol
- Transmission: 5-speed manual

Dimensions
- Wheelbase: 2,800 mm (110.2 in)
- Length: 4,400 mm (173.2 in)
- Width: 1,660 mm (65.4 in)
- Height: 1,890 mm (74.4 in)
- Curb weight: 1,130–1,260 kg (2,491–2,778 lb)

Chronology
- Predecessor: Karry Youya I

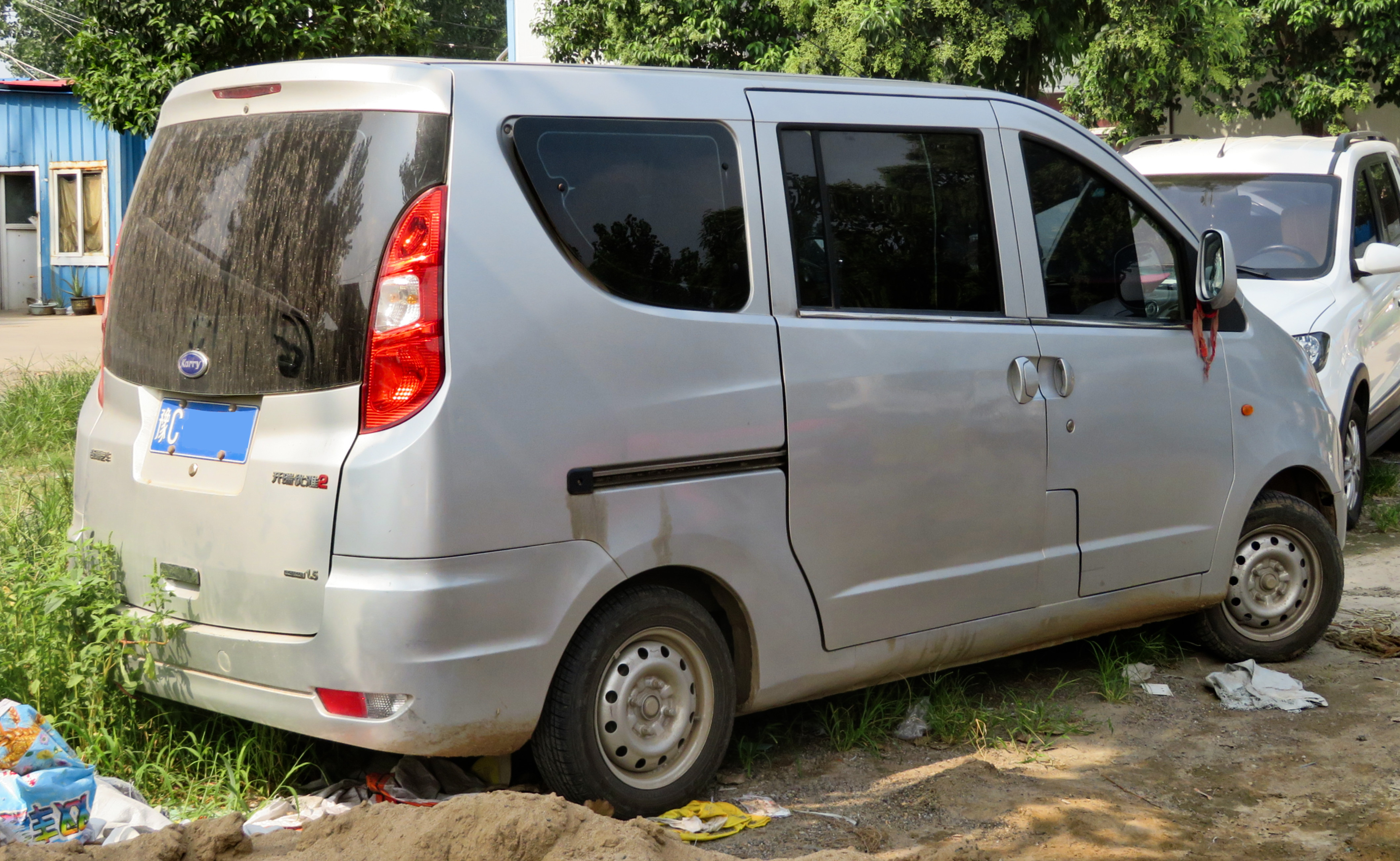
Karry Youya II rear

The Karry Youya II minivan was launched on the China car market in 2013 replacing the previous generation vehicle. Price ranges from 46.900 yuan to 59.900 yuan. The second generation Karry Youya is powered by a 1.5 liter four-cylinder engine with 190 hp and 140 nm, mated to a 5-speed manual transmission.

== See also ==
- Chery
