= USS Porpoise (SP-4) =

US Navy WWI patrol yacht

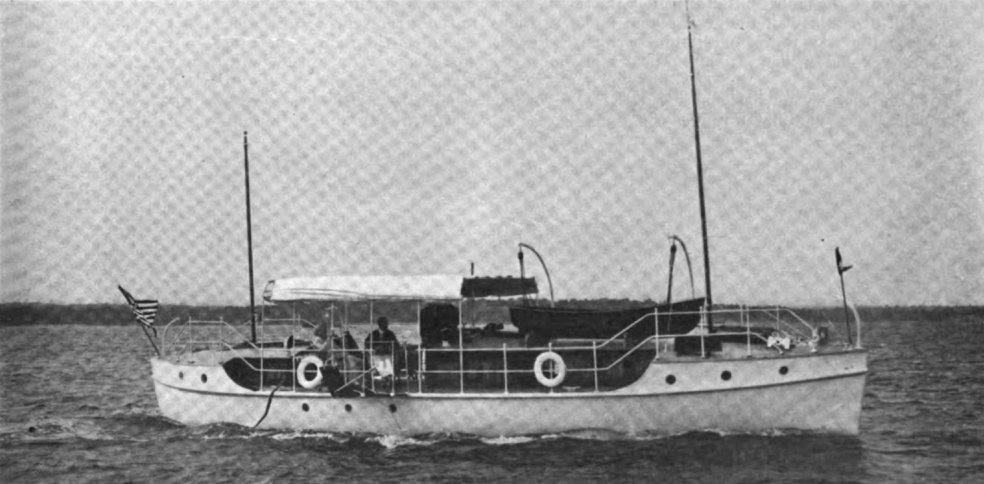
- Rudder Magazine, February 1917

History

United States
- Name: USS Porpoise
- Namesake: The porpoise, any of several small gregarious toothed whales (genus Phocoena)
- Acquired: 1917
- Fate: Unknown

General characteristics
- Type: Section Patrol Craft
- Displacement: 22 t.
- Length: 48 ft (15 m)
- Beam: 11 ft 9 in (3.58 m)
- Draft: 5 ft 2 in (1.57 m)
- Propulsion: One 4-cylinder Clifton gasoline engine, one shaft

USS Porpoise (SP-4) was a patrol yacht acquired by the United States Navy in 1917 and returned to her owner on 27 January 1919. She was built in 1910 as Casilda by Oscar Anderson, South Norwalk, Connecticut for Stewart H. Elliott of Norwalk and acquired in 1914 by Ogden M. Reid of New York City and renamed Porpoise.

Her call sign in 1919: Love - Boy - Jig - Sail
