= Karry Porpoise =

Battery electric van

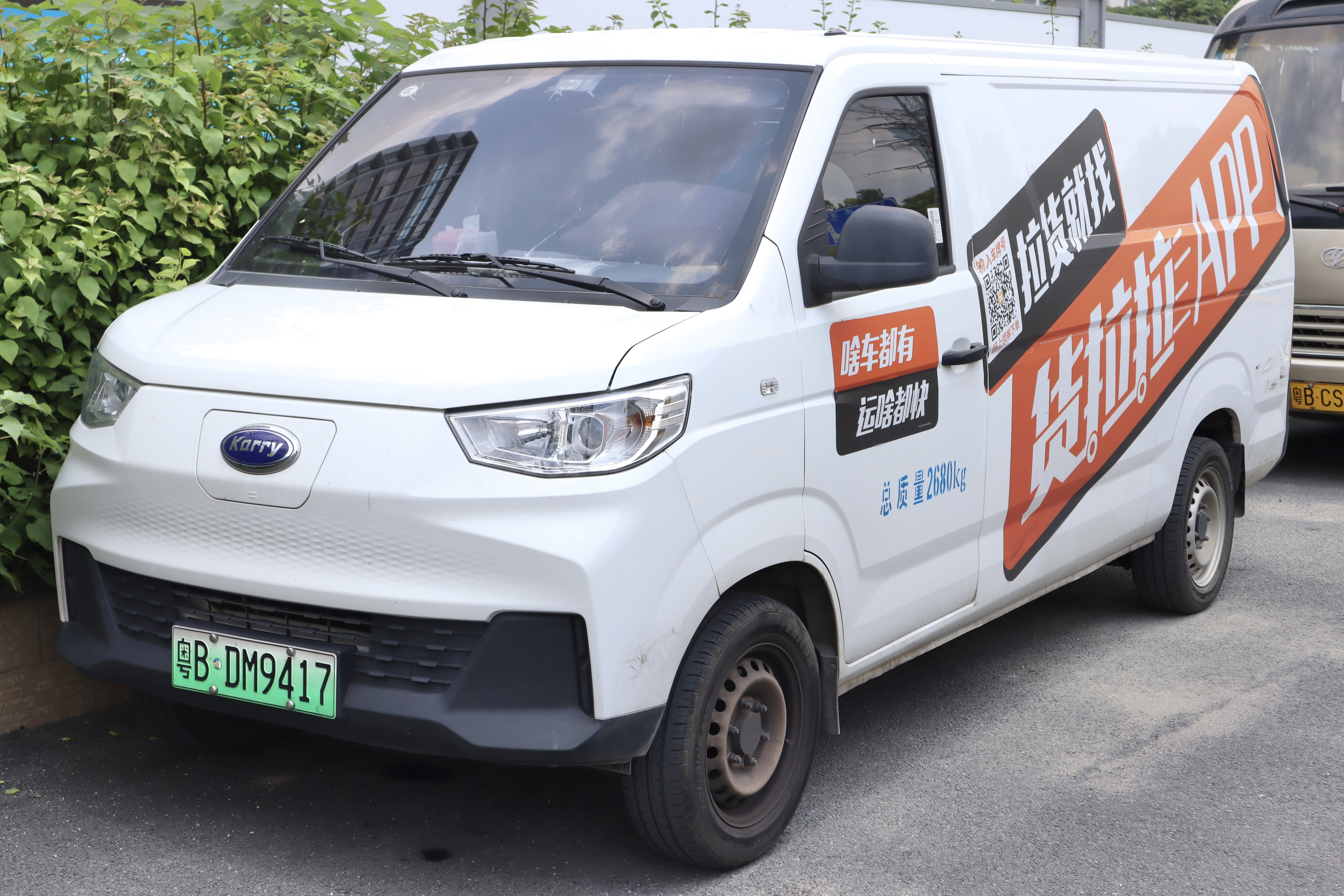
- The Karry Porpoise in Shenzhen.

Overview
- Manufacturer: Karry
- Also called: Karry Jiangtun; Karry Finless Porpoise; Kaiyi Porpoise E5/E7 (凯翼 江豚E5/E7); JAC Lanmao M1; Chery Commercial Vehicles Dolphin (海豚) K6/K7; Chery Wanda Ruiqing V6 (万达瑞擎 V6); Chevoo Panda Hongtu 6/Changjiang No.6 (骐蔚汽车熊猫宏图6/长江6号); Chevoo Panda Hongtu 7/Changjiang No.7 (骐蔚汽车熊猫宏图7/长江7号); Feidi U6 (飞碟 U6); Katay 35C (Italy)
- Production: 2022–present
- Assembly: China: Anhui

Body and chassis
- Class: Light commercial vehicle
- Body style: 4-door van
- Layout: Rear-engine, rear-wheel-drive

Powertrain
- Electric motor: Permanent magnet synchronous electric motor

Dimensions
- Wheelbase: 3,050 mm (120.1 in)
- Length: 4,746 mm (186.9 in)
- Width: 1,760 mm (69.3 in)
- Height: 1,965 mm (77.4 in)
- Curb weight: 1,512 kg (3,333 lb); 1,522 kg (3,355 lb) (E7)

The Karry Porpoise is a battery electric van designed and produced by the Chinese automaker Karry since June 2022.

== Overview ==
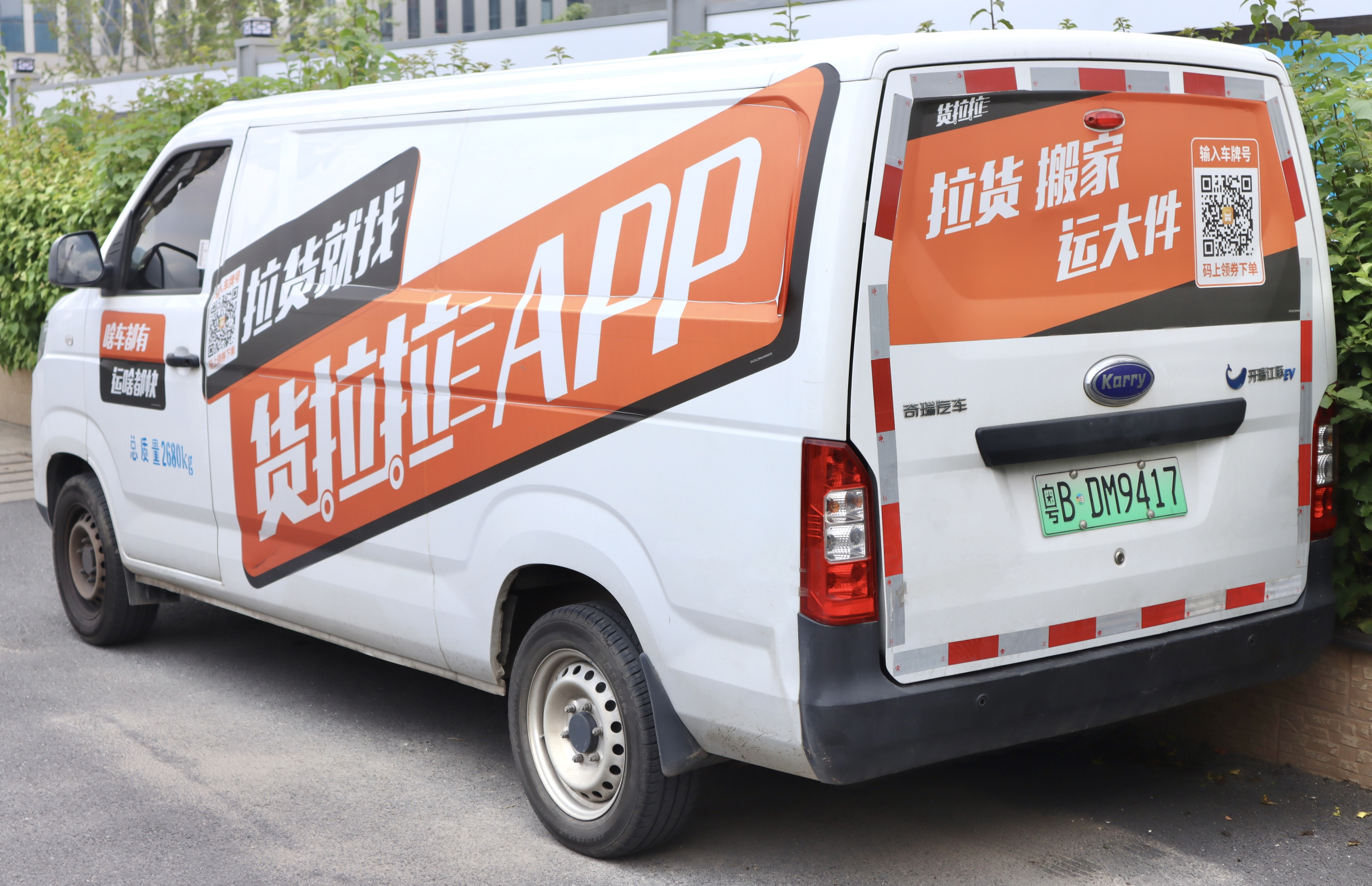
Rear view

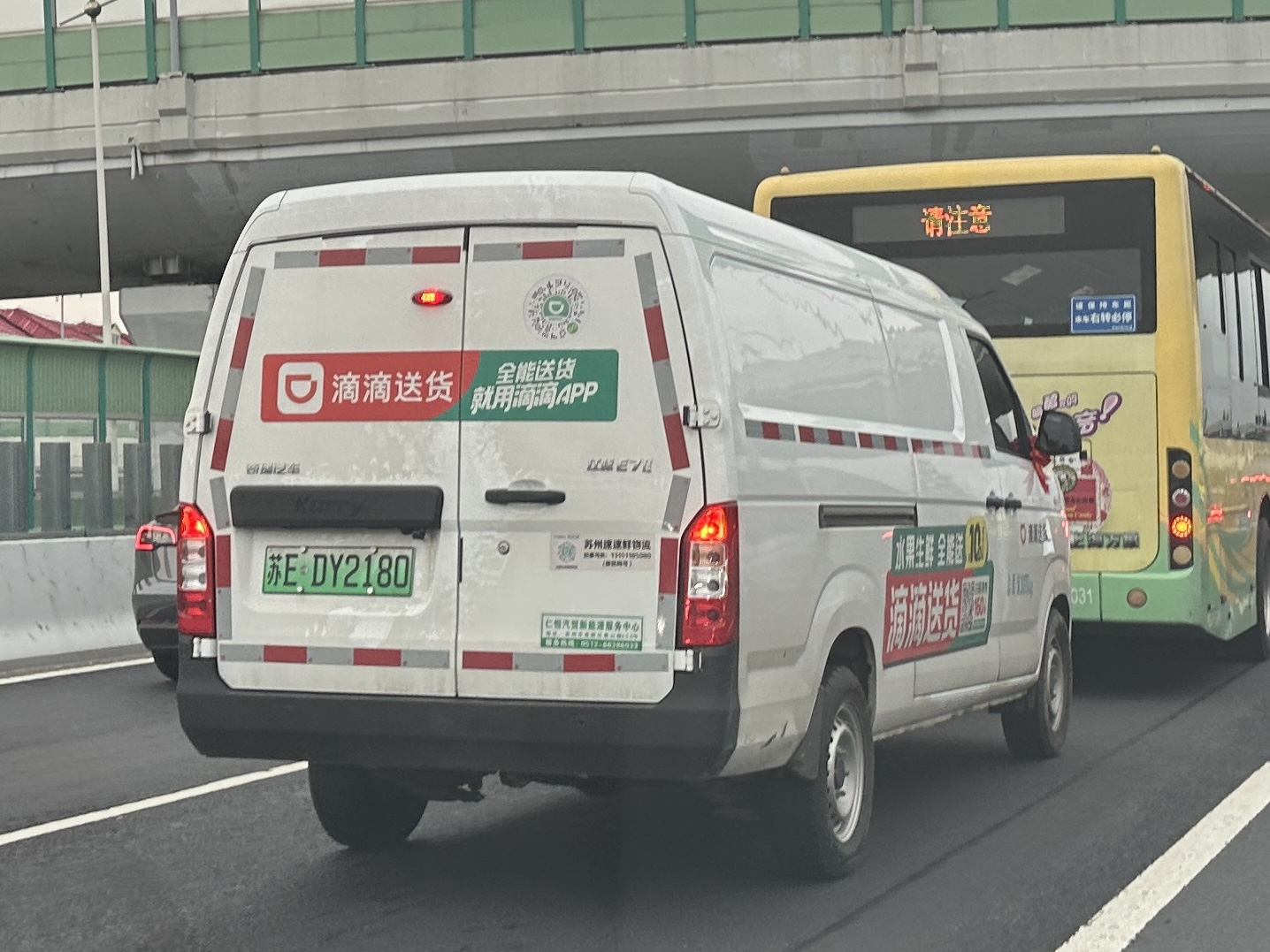
Karry Porpoise E7L (rear)

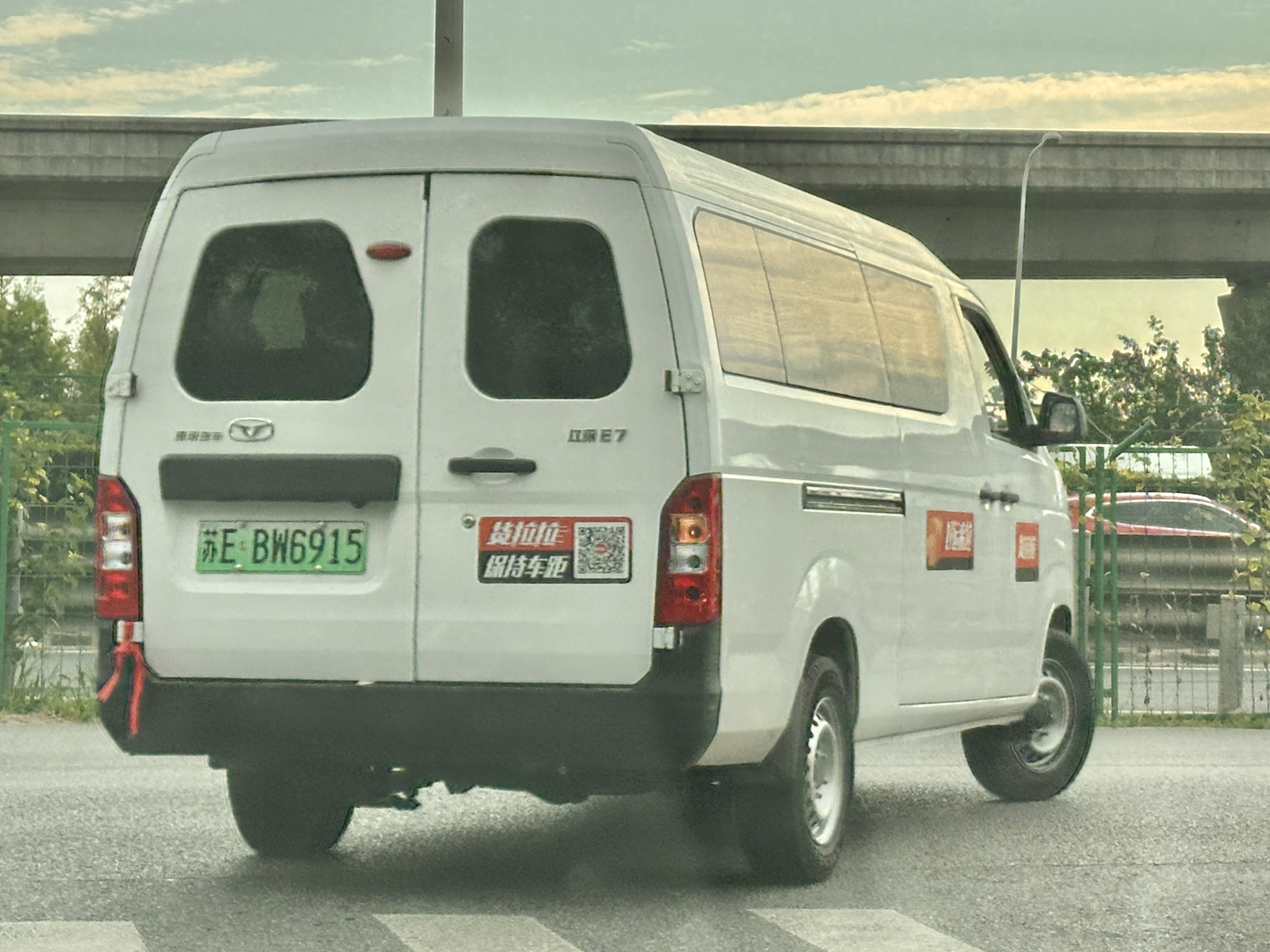
Kaiyi Porpoise E7 (rear)

The Karry Porpoise EV is an fully electric urban logistics van by Karry, specially designed for the needs of urban logistics and distribution. The same platform also spawned an ICE powered pickup truck called the Karry X6.

From 2024, the Karry Porpoise EV received various variants in dimensions, with the original Karry Porpoise being renamed the Karry Porpoise E6 retaining the 4746mm length, a longer Karry Porpoise E7 with a length of 5150mm, and a shorter Karry Porpoise E5 with a length of 4480mm. As of 2025, the Porpoise E7 bodystyle was rebadged as a Kaiyi product while the name was carried over.

== Specifications ==
The Karry Porpoise EV was built on a frame chassis with a permanent magnet synchronous electric motor positioned over the rear axle, with the output of which reaching 60 kW, and 220 Nm of torque. A 41.86 kWh lithium iron phosphate flat battery pack is located right under the floor. The Karry Porpoise EV is capable of covering 285 km on one charge. The powertrain layout of the Porpoise EV is rear-wheel drive, with MacPherson-type independent front suspension and rear-dependent leaf springs. The top speed is 80 km/h, and the cargo space is 6.6 cubic meters.

== Karry X6 ==
The Karry X6 is the gasoline powered micro truck variant of the Porpoise EV. The Karry X6 was launched in February 2022, and available as a crew cab and single cab body style. The powertrain of the Karry X6 is a 1.6 liter engine mated to a 5-speed manual transmission developing 22hp and 158N·m of torque.

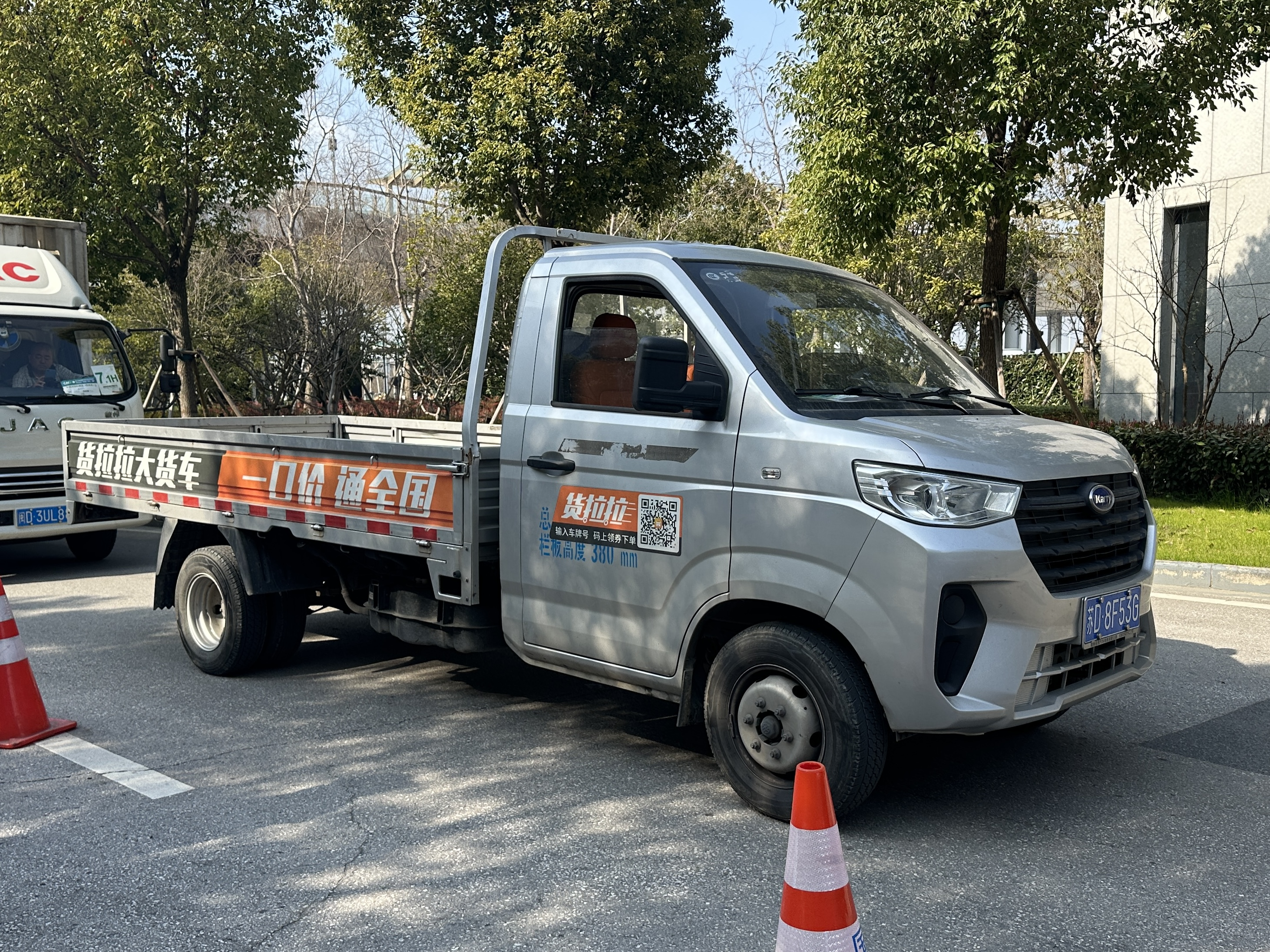
Karry X6 (single cab)

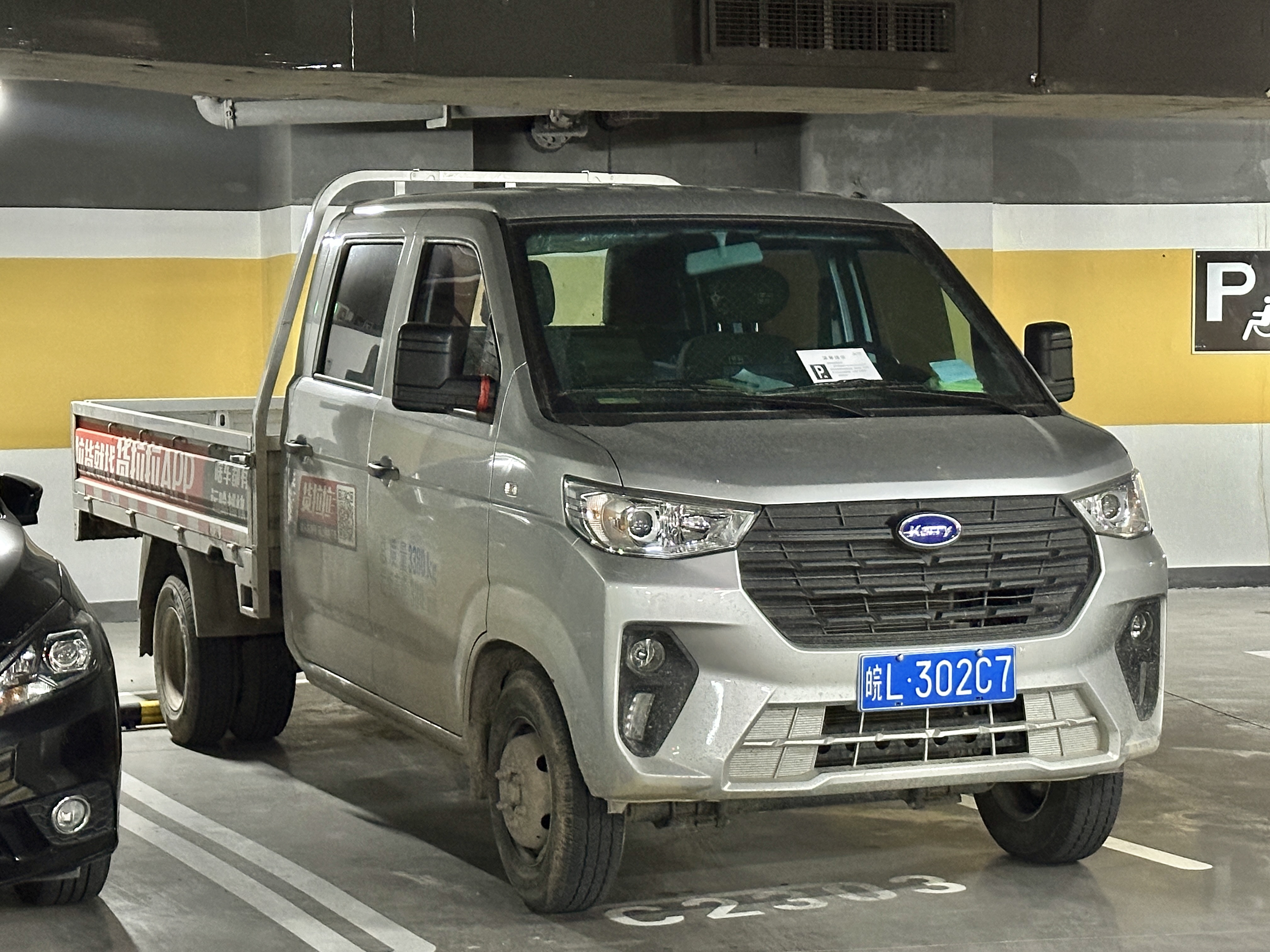
Karry X6 (crew cab)

== Karry Little Elephant / Chevoo Changjiang No.6 ==
The Karry Little Elephant (小象, Xiaoxiang) is the micro truck variant of the Porpoise. Sharing the body with the Karry X6 while featuring the grille-less front end of the Karry Porpoise. It was launched in January 2023 and features a 85kW permanent magnet synchronous motor and 55.7kWh lithium iron phosphate battery (LFP battery) supplied by CATL, supporting a CLTC range of 251km. It is equipped with the e-Motion Drive 2.0 electric drive system with 30%-80% of the battery charged within 36 minutes.

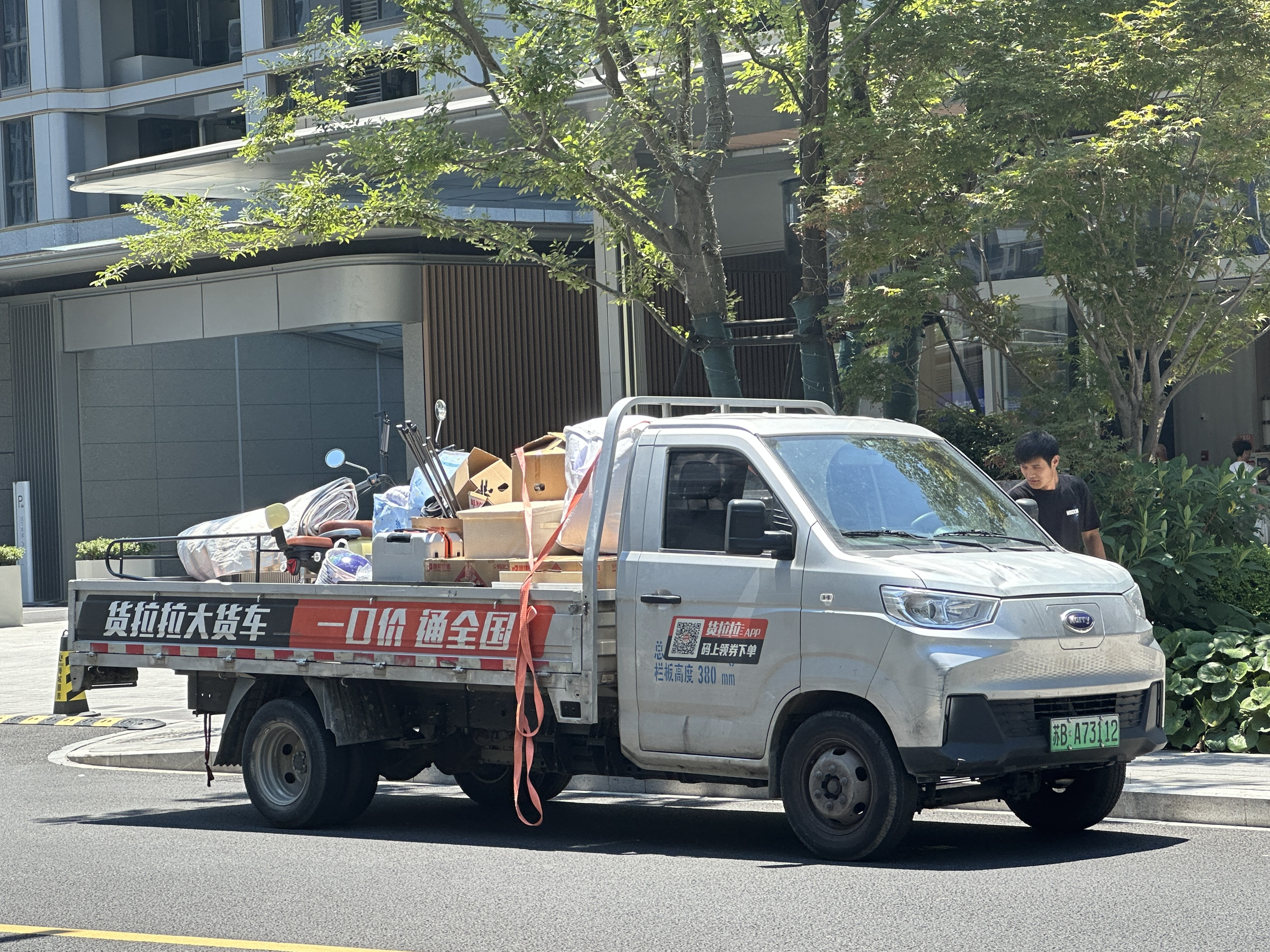
Karry Little Elephant

Chevoo Changjiang No.6

Rear view

== JAC Lanmao M1 ==
The JAC Lanmao M1 (蓝猫M1) is a rebadged variant of the Karry Porpoise electric van. The JAC Lanmao M1 features a restyled front bumper and 40.55kWh batteries supplied by Gotion High-Tech.

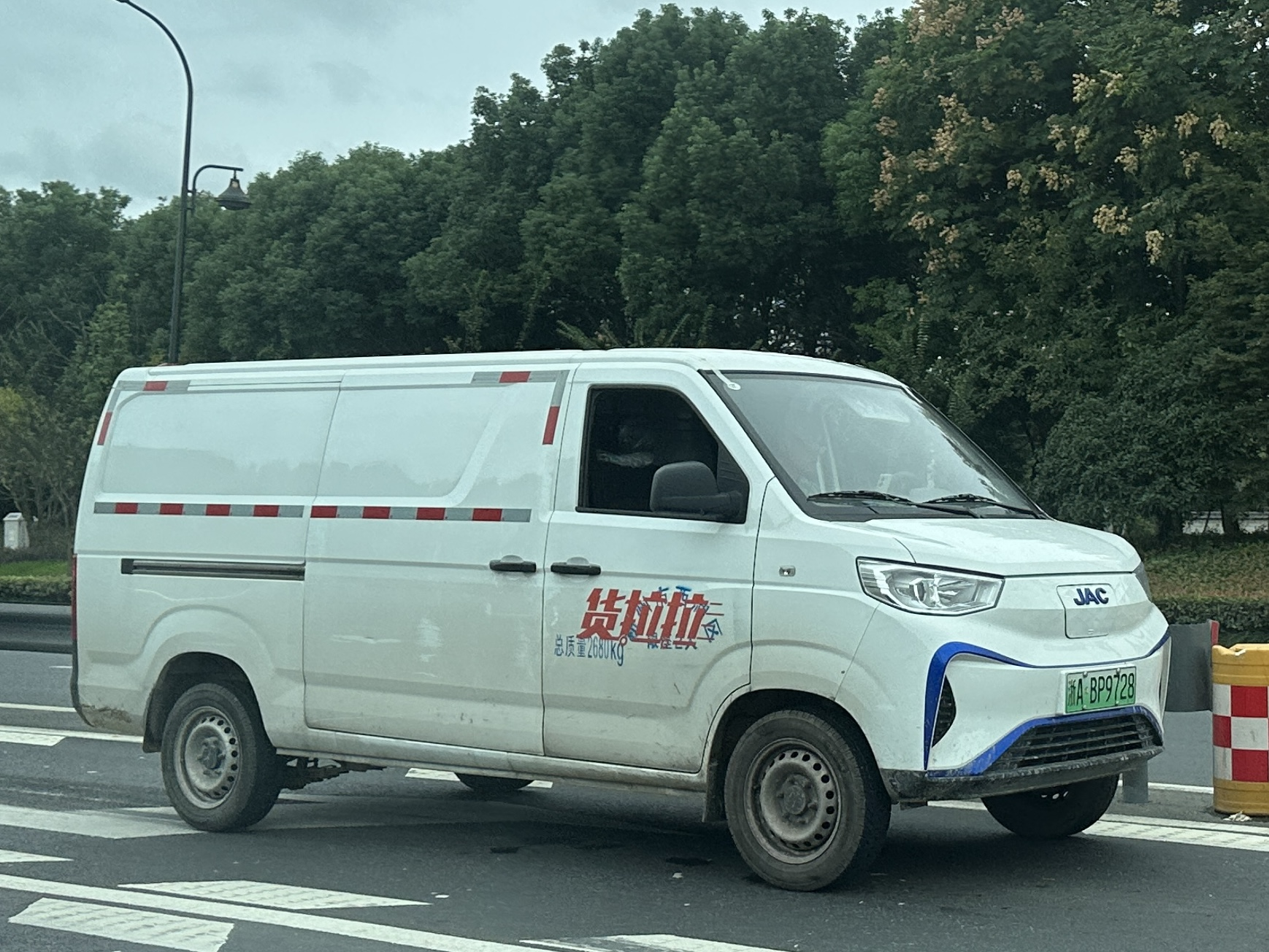
JAC Lanmao M1

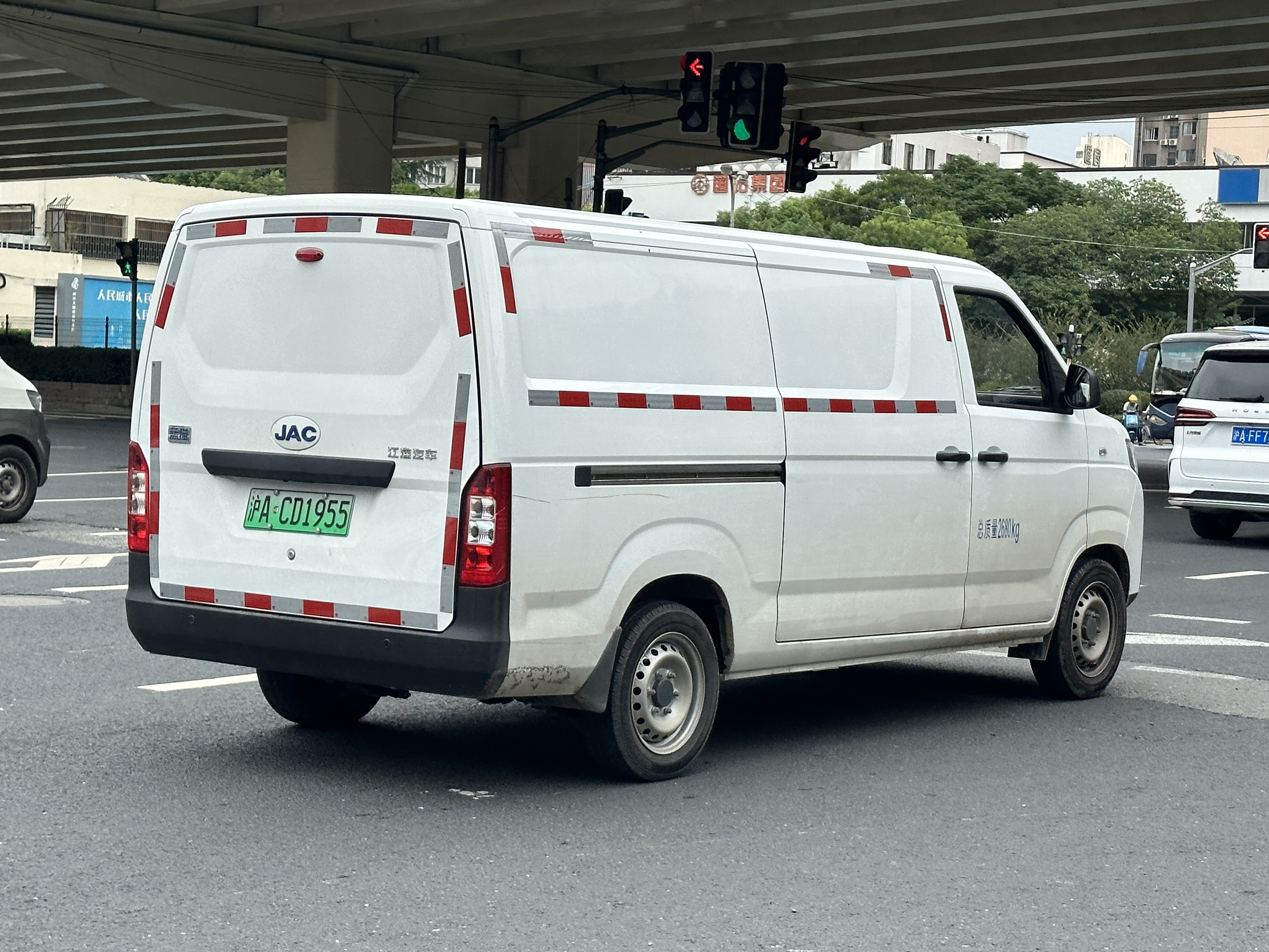
Rear view
