= Wuling Motors =

Chinese automobile manufacturer

Wuling Motor Holdings, Ltd.
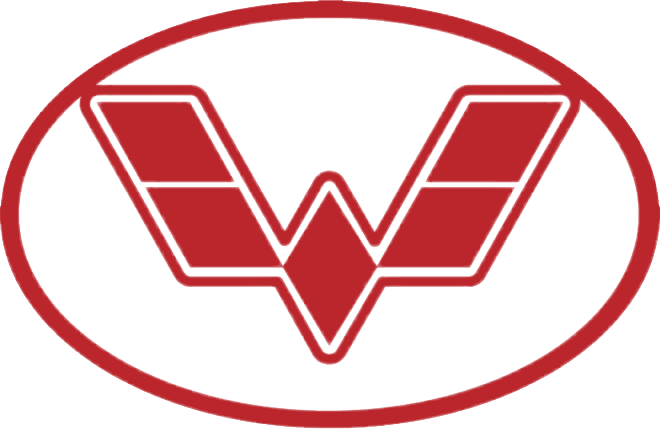
- Trade name: Wuling Motors
- Native name: 五菱汽车集团控股有限公司
- Type: Subsidiary
- Industry: Automotive
- Predecessor: Liuzhou Wuling Automobile
- Founded: 1982; 44 years ago
- Headquarters: Liuzhou, Guangxi, China
- Area served: Worldwide
- Key people: Yang Jie (CEO)
- Products: Electric vehicles, trucks, buses, engines
- Owners: Guangxi Automotive Group (56.54%) (Hongkong Stock Exchange No. 305)
- Subsidiaries: Liuzhou Wuling Automobile Industry (60.9%); Liuzhou Wuling New Energy Vehicle (13.37%)
- Website: wuling.com

Wuling Motor Holdings, Ltd., (doing business as Wuling Motors; Chinese: 五菱汽车; pinyin: Wǔlíng Qìchē) is a Chinese manufacturer of automobiles, subsidiary of Guangxi Automotive Group. The company produce engines, and special purpose vehicles, namely mini electric cars, people movers, trucks and buses, and auto parts. Its eponymous brand, Wuling, is shared with the SAIC-GM-Wuling joint venture.

== History ==
=== Liuzhou Wuling Automobile ===
The Wuling car brand was established in 1982 by Liuzhou Wuling Automobile, with a focus on the growing demand for small delivery vehicles in the domestic Chinese market during the 1980s. After completing a trial production series in 1982, Wuling commenced full-scale production of its first model, the LZ110, in 1984. This vehicle was developed under a licensing agreement with Mitsubishi Motors, making it a twin design to the third-generation Mitsubishi Minicab.

Building on Mitsubishi's technology, Wuling introduced a successor to the LZ110 in 1990, named the Dragon. Presented as a more modern model, the Dragon was a deeply updated version of the LZ110. In 1998, Wuling launched the LZW6370, a model developed under a licensing agreement with another Japanese manufacturer Daihatsu and based on the Daihatsu Zebra.

=== SAIC-GM-Wuling and Wuling Group ===
In 2002, Wuling entered into a partnership with SAIC Motor and General Motors to form a joint venture called SAIC-GM-Wuling. This joint venture was headquartered in Liuzhou, Guangxi, China, and became responsible for manufacturing all subsequent Wuling brand models.

In 2007, the Wuling Group gained greater independence and established a new division specializing in trucks and custom-built vehicles. This division operated under the Wuling brand and logo, similar to Wuling's Red Label. In 2015, the Wuling Group underwent a major corporate restructuring, becoming a corporation and rebranding itself as Guangxi Automobile Group.

== Leadership ==
- Lee Shing (2006–2022)
- Song Wei (2023–2025)
- Yang Jie (2025–present)

== Products ==
=== Current models ===
- Wuling G050 (2023-present), minivan, also rebadged as ASF 2.0, Linxys G050, Linxys G50 Piccolo, ACE EV Mini Van and Katay 16
- Wuling G050P (2023-present), BEV Kei truck, also rebadged as ACE EV Mini Yewt
- Wuling G100/EV50 (2020-present), light van, also rebadged as BYD V3, BAW Xiaohema
  - Wuling G100P/Dianka (2022-present), light truck
- Wuling G200P (2023-present), PHEV light truck
- Wuling EV80 (2022-present), medium van
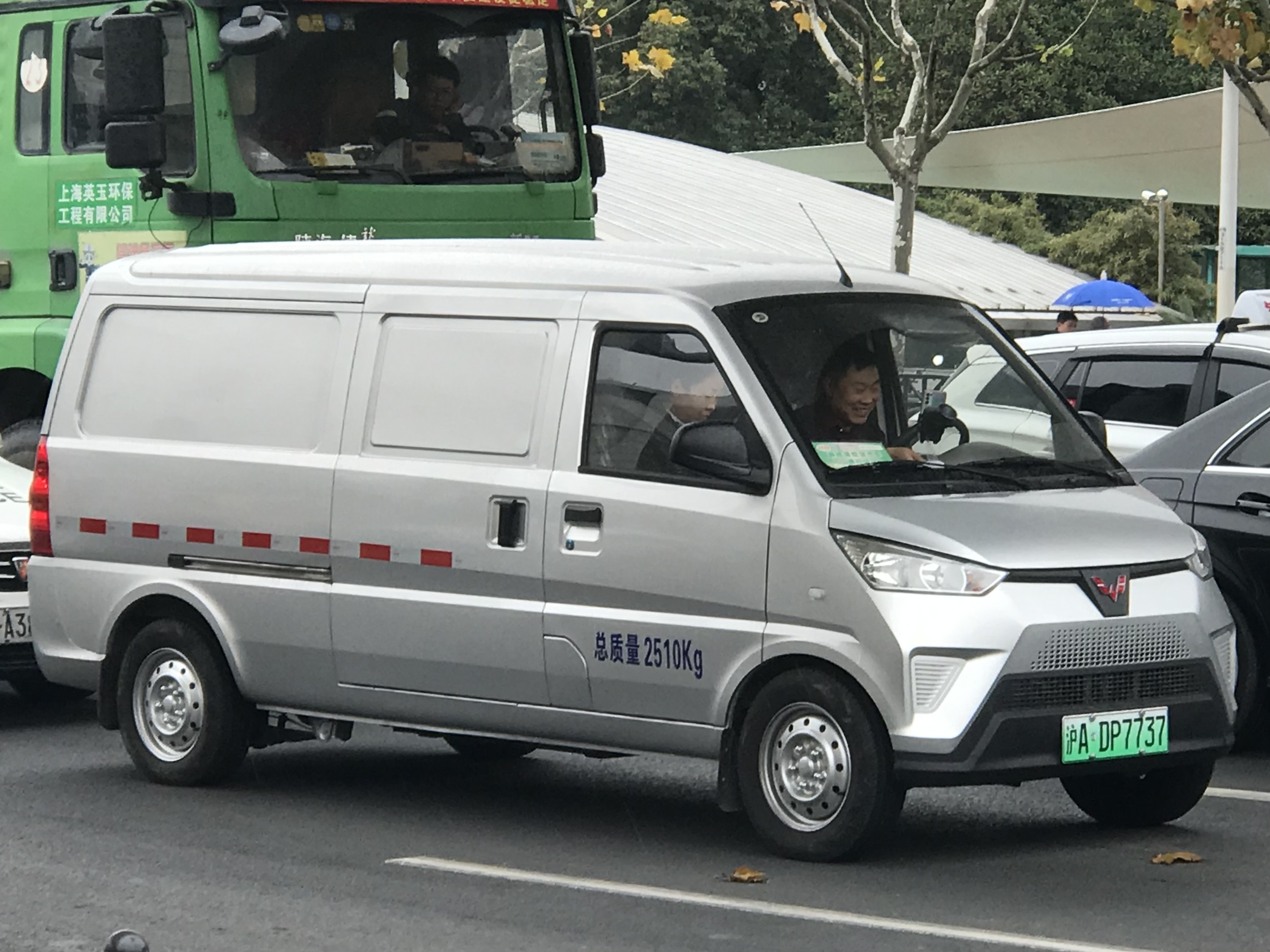
Wuling EV50

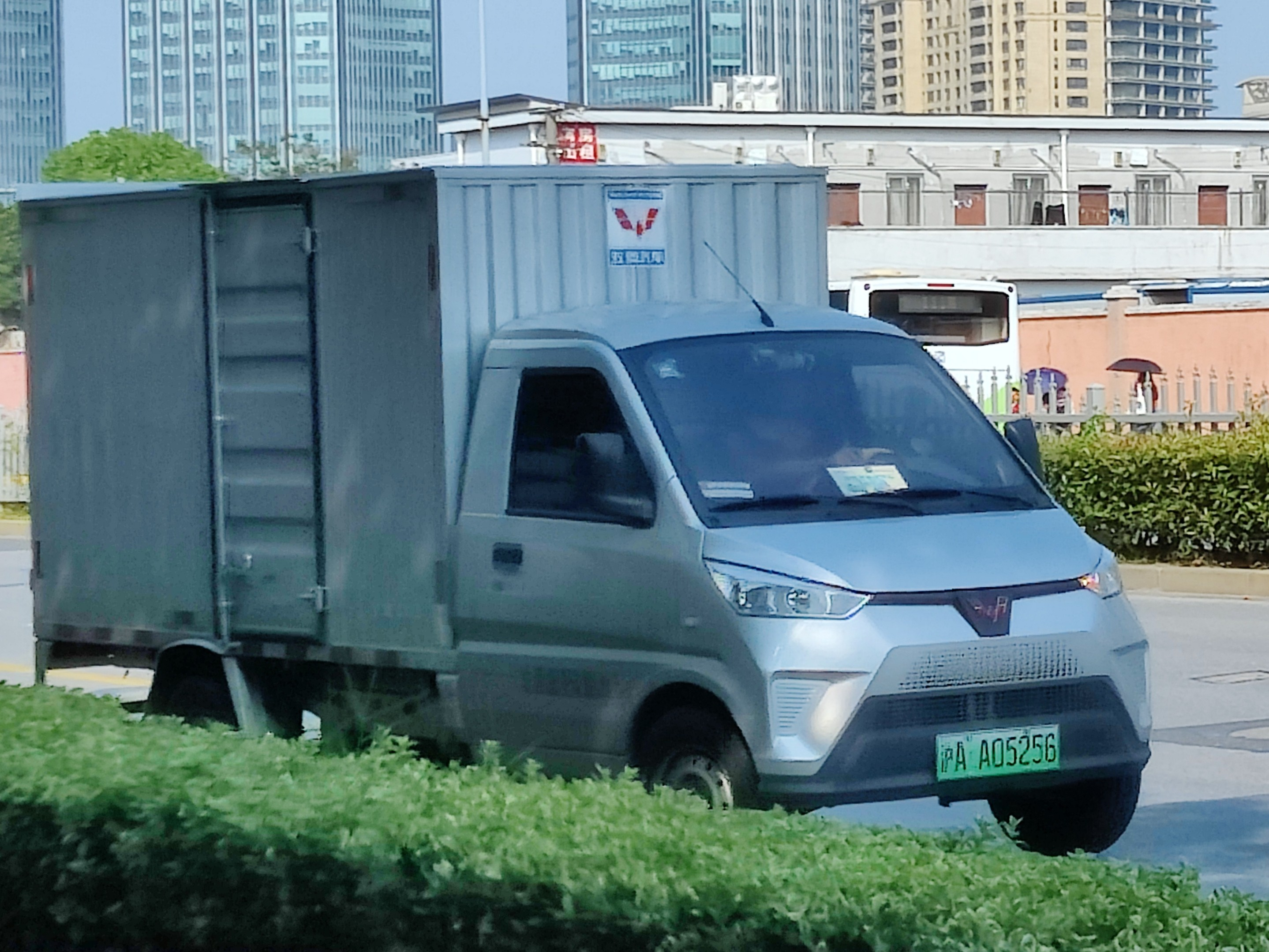
Wuling Dianka

=== Former models (as Liuzhou Wuling) ===
- Wuling LZ110 (1984–1990), minivan, licensed built Mitsubishi Minicab
- Wuling LZW7100/ Wuling Visa (1991–1994), subcompact car, rebadged Citroën Visa
- Wuling LZ6370A (1998–2003), microvan, rebadged Daihatsu Zebra, production transferred to SGMW after its established.
  - Wuling LZW6370Ei, pickup variant
- Wuling Xingwang/ Dragon (1990–2009), microvan, production transferred to SGMW after its established
- Wuling LZW6381/ Wuling Hongtu (2007–2012), microvan, production transferred to SGMW after its established
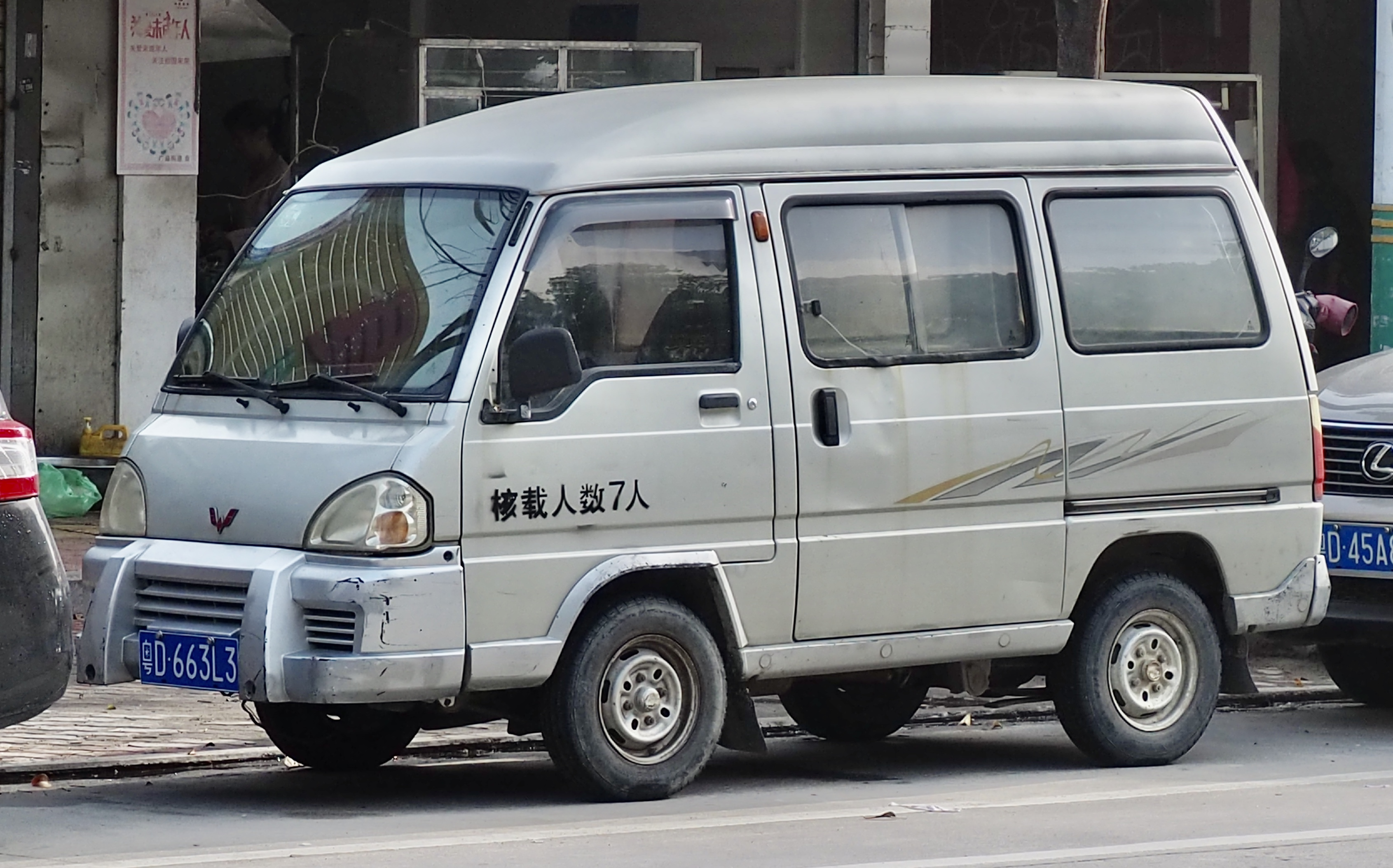
Wuling Dragon

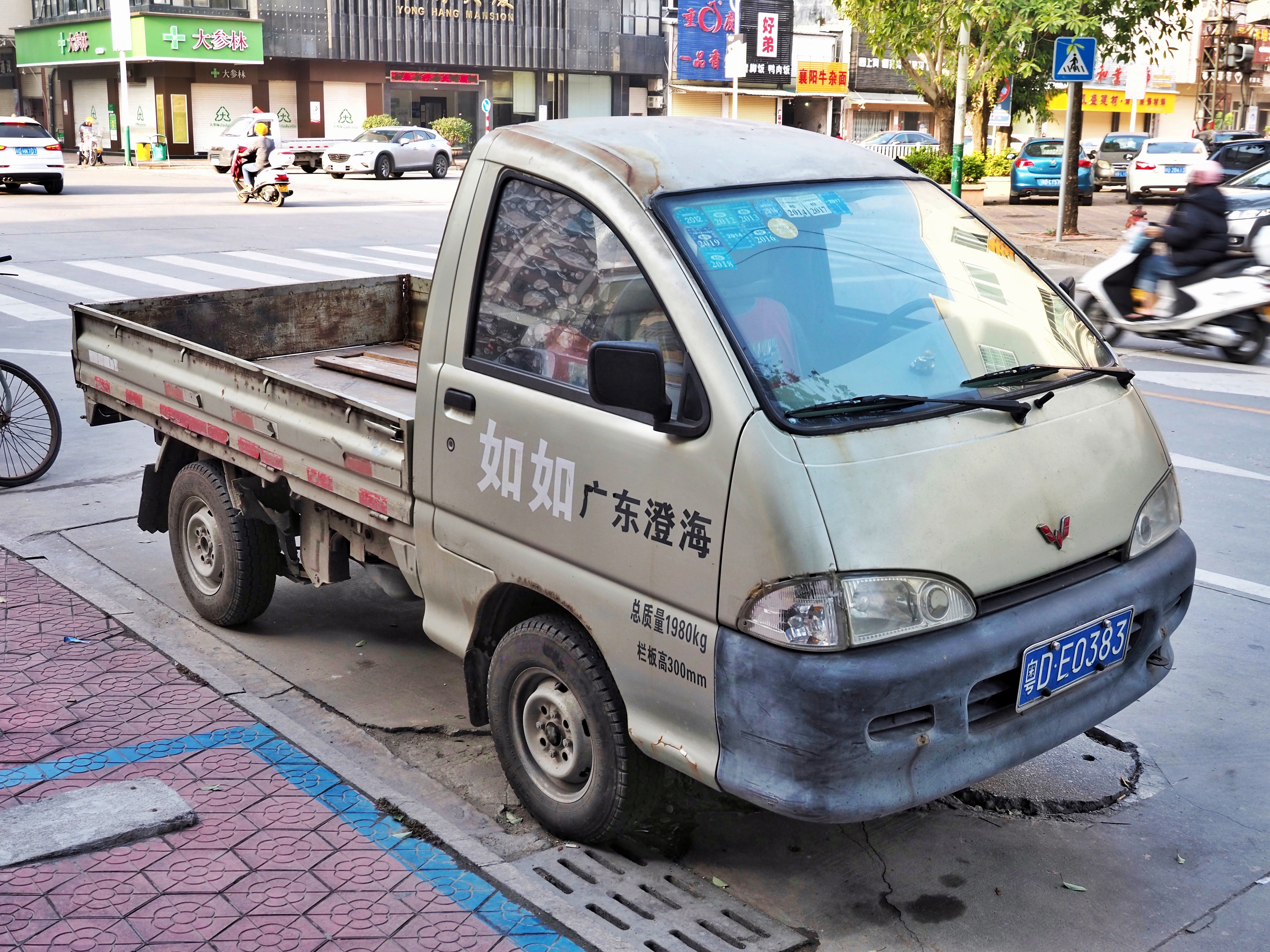
Wuling LZW6370

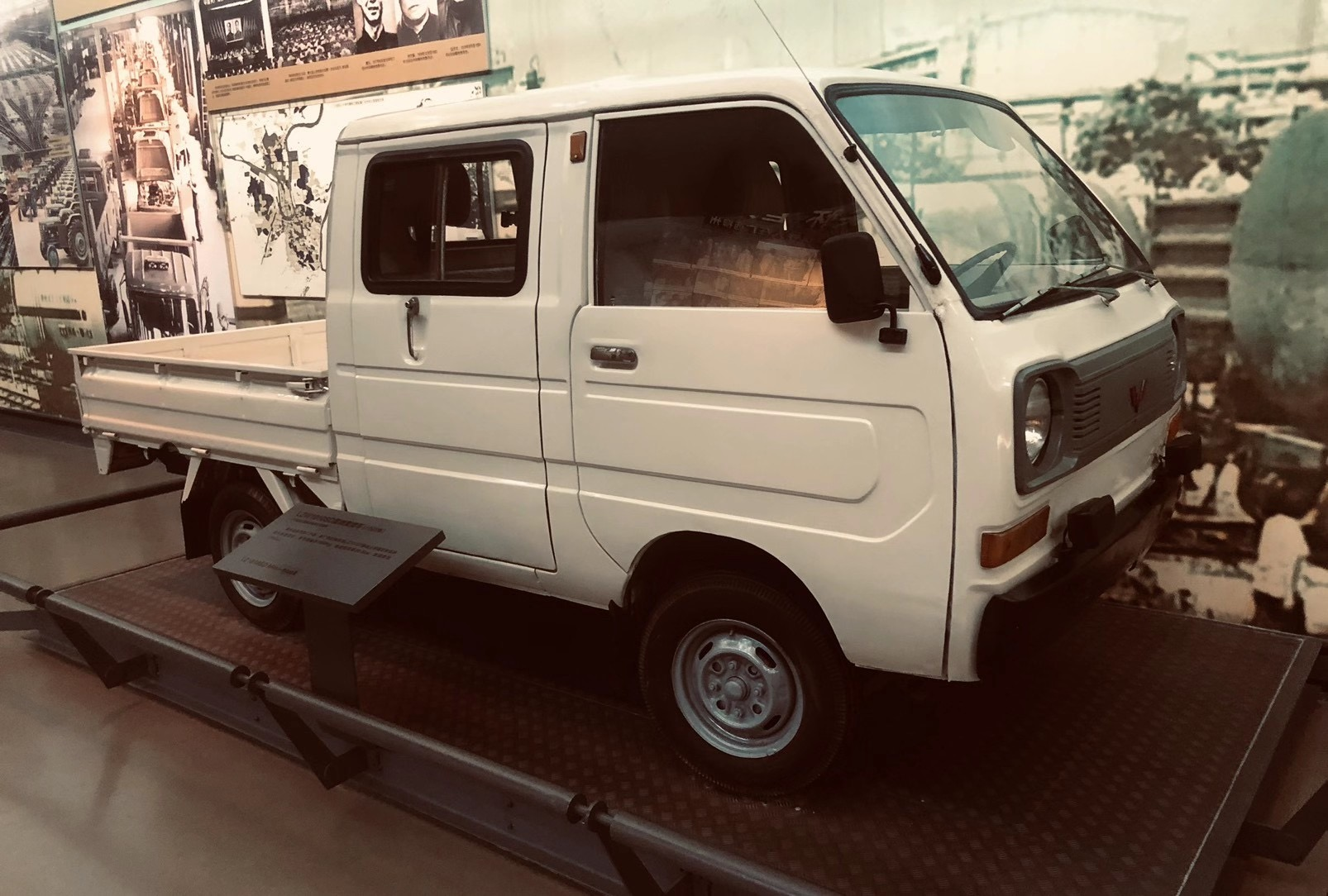
Wuling LZ110

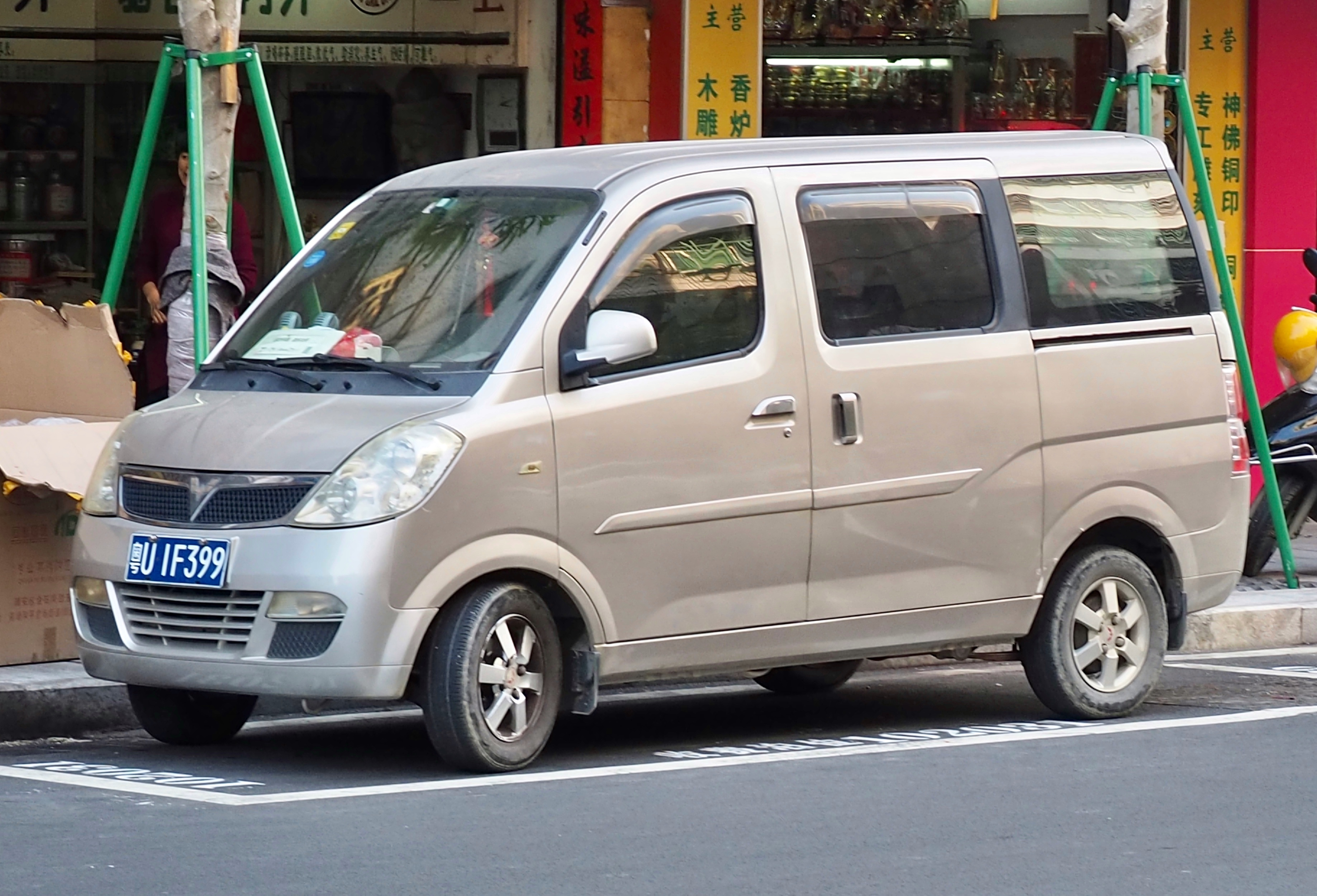
Wuling Hongtu

=== Motorcycle ===
- Lingyang (羚羊)
- A10Y
- A10N
- A11G
- P20
- A10G
- A10Y
- J10
- J6
- Jueying (绝影)

=== Electric bicycle ===
- C1
- C2

=== Golf cart ===
- GOLF CAR (4 seat)
- GOLF CAR (6 seat)
- GOLF CAR (4+2 seat)
- GOLF CAR (6+2 seat)

=== Sightseeing car ===
- WULING WLQ5080 SIGHTSEEING CAR (8 seat)
- WULING WLD2111 SIGHTSEEING CAR (8 seat)
- WULING WLQ5110 SIGHTSEEING CAR (11 seat)
- WULING WLQ5140 SIGHTSEEING CAR (14 seat)
- WULING WLQL SIGHTSEEING CAR (23 seat)

== Subsidiaries and joint ventures ==
- Liuzhou Wuling Motors United Development Co. Ltd.
- Liuzhou Wuling Special-purpose Vehicle Manufacturing Co. Ltd.
- Liuzhou Wuling Liuji Power Co. Ltd.
- Wuling Engine, a division of Wuling Automobile which manufactures Wuling-branded engines for small autos and motorcycles. Some are in cooperation with companies such as Delphi.
- Liuzhou AAM, a joint venture between Wuling and American Axle & Manufacturing, manufacturing electric drive units, independent rear axles and driveheads.

Wuling Automobile also manufactures generator sets under the "Longward" brand.
