= Wuling EV80 =

Battery electric van

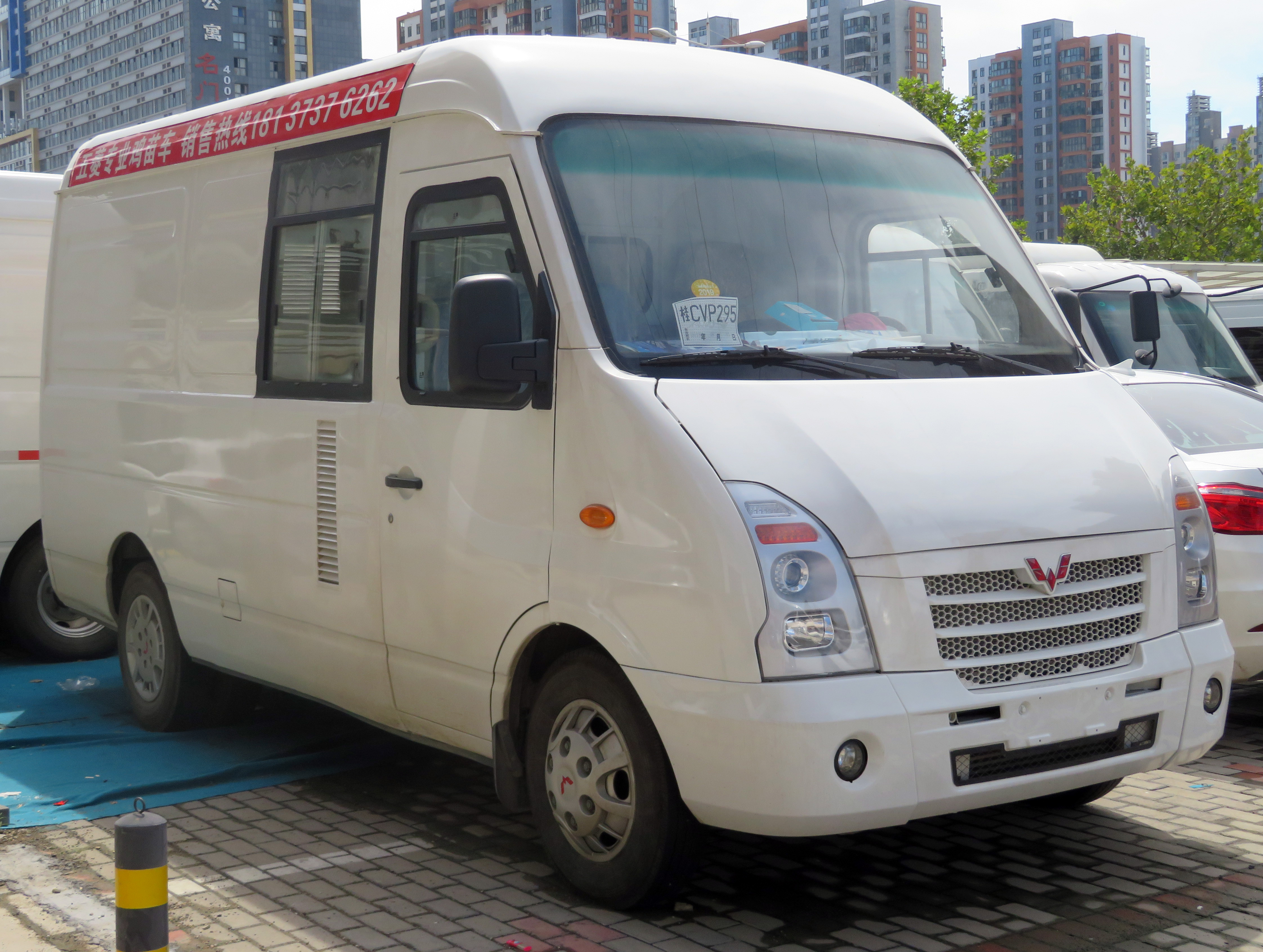
- The Wuling EV80 in Zhengzhou.

Overview
- Manufacturer: Wuling
- Also called: GL5040XXY (van); Wuling Andaxing School Bus (GL6553XQ)
- Production: 2018–present
- Assembly: China: Liuzhou, Guangxi

Body and chassis
- Class: Light commercial vehicle
- Body style: 4-door van
- Layout: Rear-motor, rear-wheel-drive

Powertrain
- Electric motor: Permanent magnet synchronous
- Power output: 110 kW (150 PS)
- Battery: 76.8 kWh
- Electric range: 330 km (205 mi) (CLTC)

Dimensions
- Length: 5,575 mm (219.5 in)
- Width: 2,098 mm (82.6 in)
- Height: 2,650 mm (104.3 in)
- Curb weight: 2,890 kg (6,371 lb)

The Wuling EV80 is a battery electric van manufactured by Wuling, a part of Guangxi Automobile Group.

== Overview ==
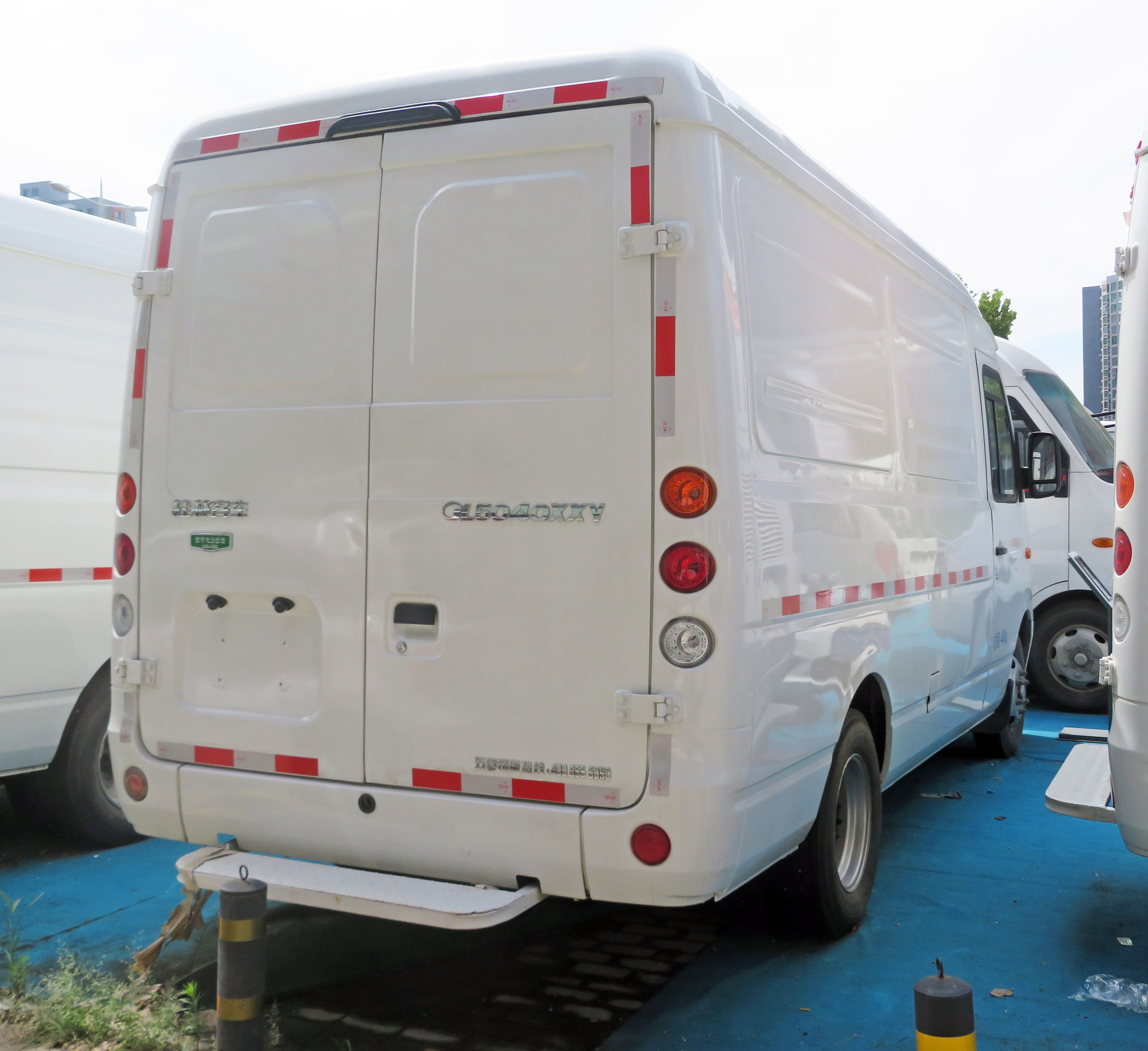
Rear view

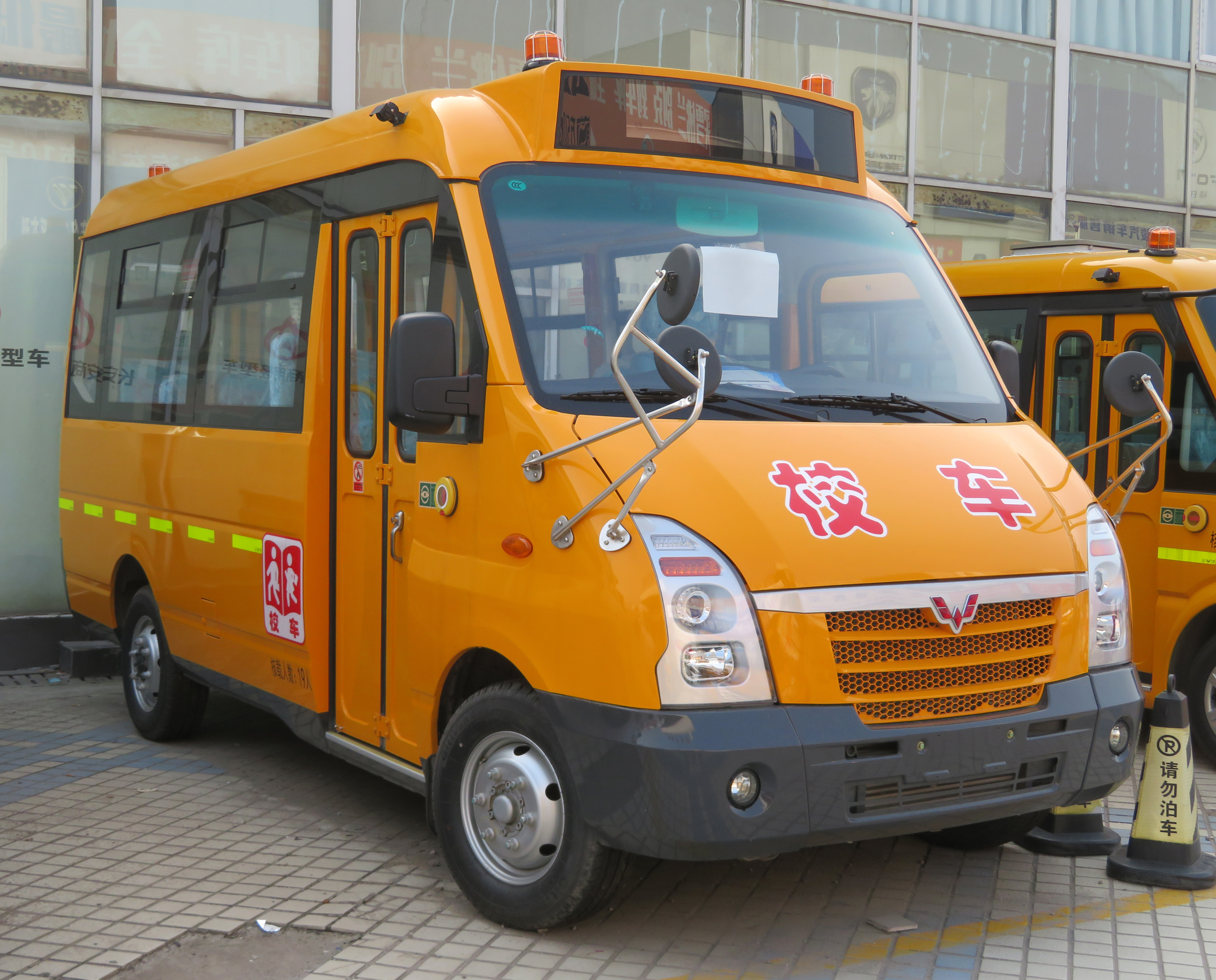
Wuling Andaxing School Bus (GL6553XQ)

The EV80 is a fully electric urban logistics van by Wuling with a unibody chassis, specially designed for the needs of urban logistics and distribution. A mini school bus variant is also available as the Wuling Andaxing School Bus.

== Specifications ==
The EV80 is equipped with a permanent magnet synchronous electric motor powering the rear axle, with the output of which reaching 150Ps (110kW). The suspension is double wishbone suspension in the front suspension and rear-dependent leaf springs. Top speed is 100 km/h.
