= Wuling =

China automotive brand

Wuling 五菱

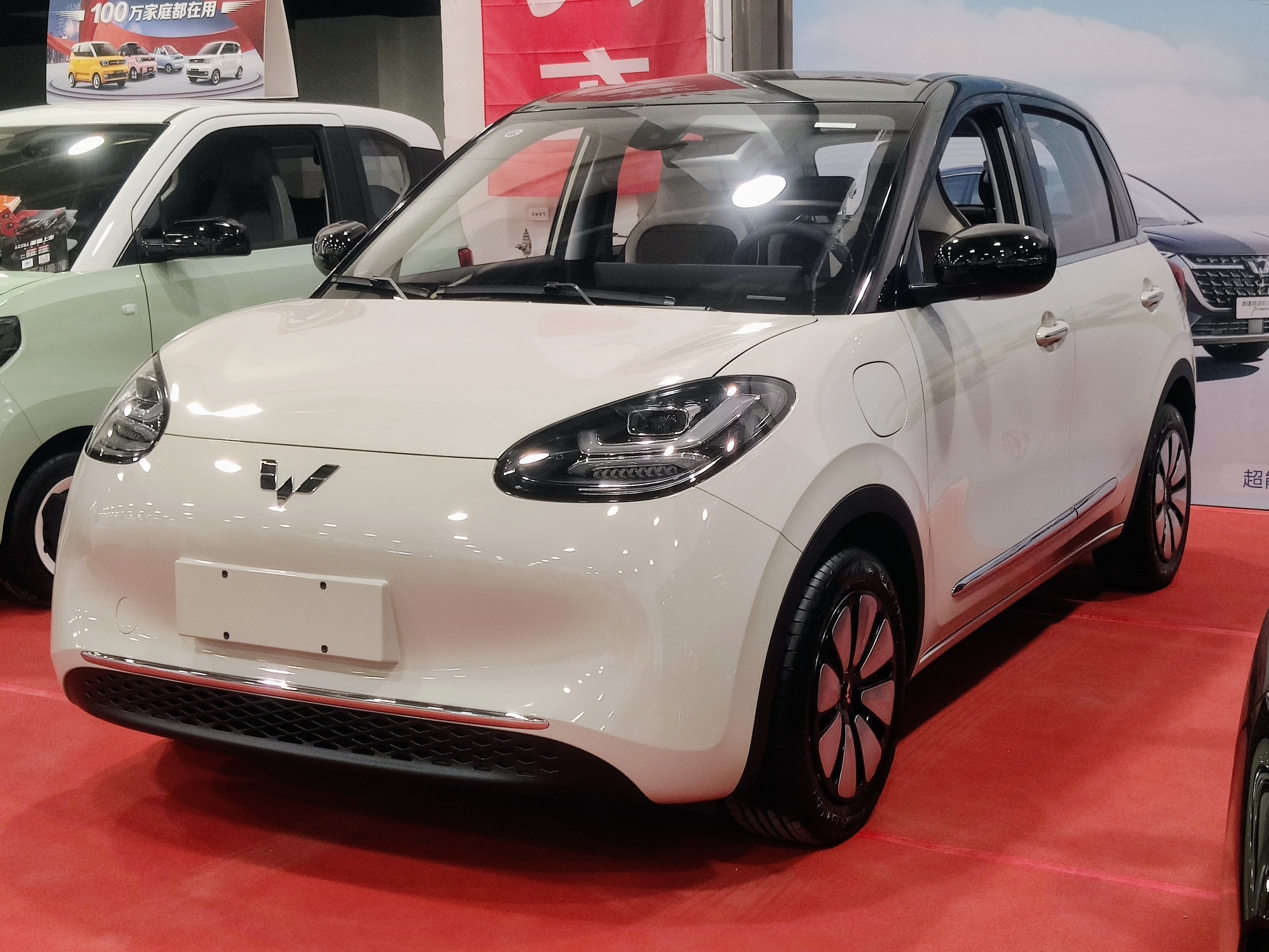
- Wuling Binguo
- Product type: Automobile brand
- Current owner: Guangxi Automobile Group
- Produced by: Guangxi Automobile Group, SAIC-GM-Wuling, Wuling Motors
- Country: China
- Introduced: 1987
- Markets: China, Indonesia, etc.

Wuling (Chinese: 五菱; lit. 'Five rhombus') is a Chinese automobile brand owned by Guangxi Automobile Group, and licensed to SAIC-GM-Wuling for production and sales. Wuling brand vehicles cover minivans, light commercial vehicles, passenger cars, and new energy vehicles. The brand has a wide influence in the Chinese domestic market and operates in some overseas countries.

== History ==
=== Brand Origin ===
In 1982, Liuzhou Tractor Factory began to switch to the production of micro-vehicles; in 1983, the factory was designated by the state as one of the four designated micro-vehicle manufacturers in China, thus officially entering the automobile manufacturing field. In the same year, the first minivan, LZ110, was successfully trial-produced, based on a technology license from Mitsubishi Minicab of Japan.

In 1984, the LZ110 passed national technical appraisal and was launched on the market, achieving market success. The company officially changed its name to "Liuzhou Micro-Vehicle Factory" in 1985, and "Wuling" was established as the automobile brand. In 1987, the brand logo was redesigned into a "W" shape composed of five diamonds, which has been used ever since.

=== Brand Licensing ===
After 1999, the automobile market remained sluggish, and Liuzhou Wuling decided to undergo a joint venture restructuring. In 2002, SAIC Group, General Motors, and Liuzhou Wuling jointly established SAIC-GM-Wuling Automobile Co., Ltd., agreeing that SAIC-GM-Wuling would primarily produce complete vehicles; Liuzhou Wuling would focus on special-purpose vehicles, engines, and parts as its three main businesses, and authorized SAIC-GM-Wuling to use the Wuling trademark.

== Brand Logo ==
The early Wuling brand logo adopted the "W" logo of the Wanjia brand sewing machine successfully developed by Liuzhou Tractor Factory in the fourth season of 1980. In 1987, the brand logo was redesigned by Wei Hongwen, the current Party Secretary and Chairman of Guangxi Automobile Group, into a "W" shape composed of five diamonds, symbolizing "takeoff and soaring" development. This logo has been used ever since and has become an important visual identification element of the Wuling brand.
