= Aishang A100C =

Battery electric city car

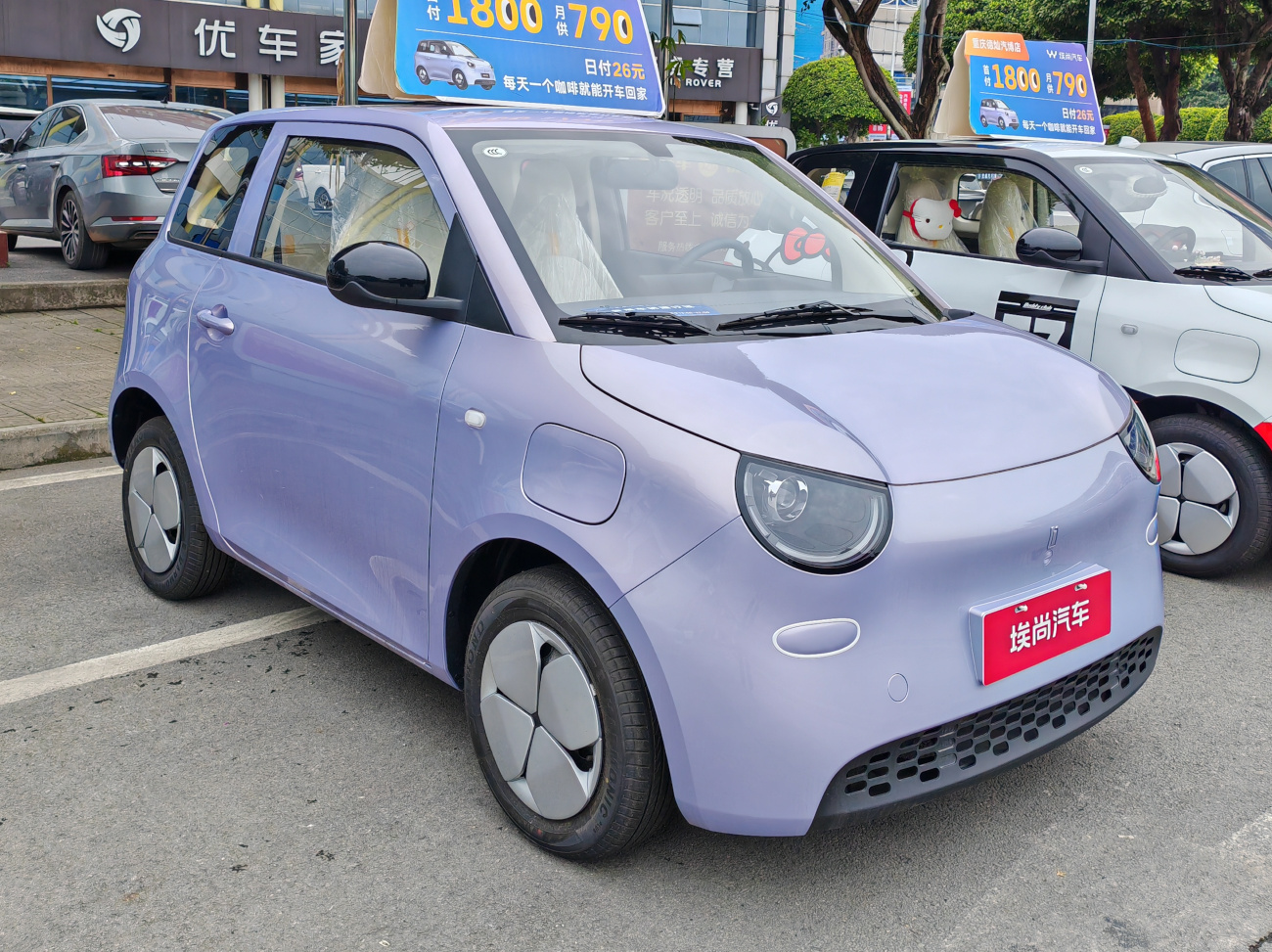

Overview
- Manufacturer: Guangxi Automobile Group
- Production: September 2025 – present
- Assembly: China: Liuzhou

Body and chassis
- Class: City car (A)
- Body style: 3-door hatchback
- Layout: Rear-motor, rear-wheel-drive
- Platform: Lingqiao Architecture
- Related: Changan Lumin

Powertrain
- Power output: 47 hp (35 kW; 48 PS)
- Battery: 17.65 kWh LFP Gotion
- Electric range: 220 km (137 mi) (CLTC)

Dimensions
- Wheelbase: 1,980 mm (78.0 in)
- Length: 3,285 mm (129.3 in)
- Width: 1,708 mm (67.2 in)
- Height: 1,550 mm (61.0 in)

The Aishang A100C (Chinese: 埃尚A100C; pinyin: Āishàng A100C) is a battery electric city car produced by Guangxi Automobile under the Aishang brand. It is the first model of the Aishang brand.

== Overview ==
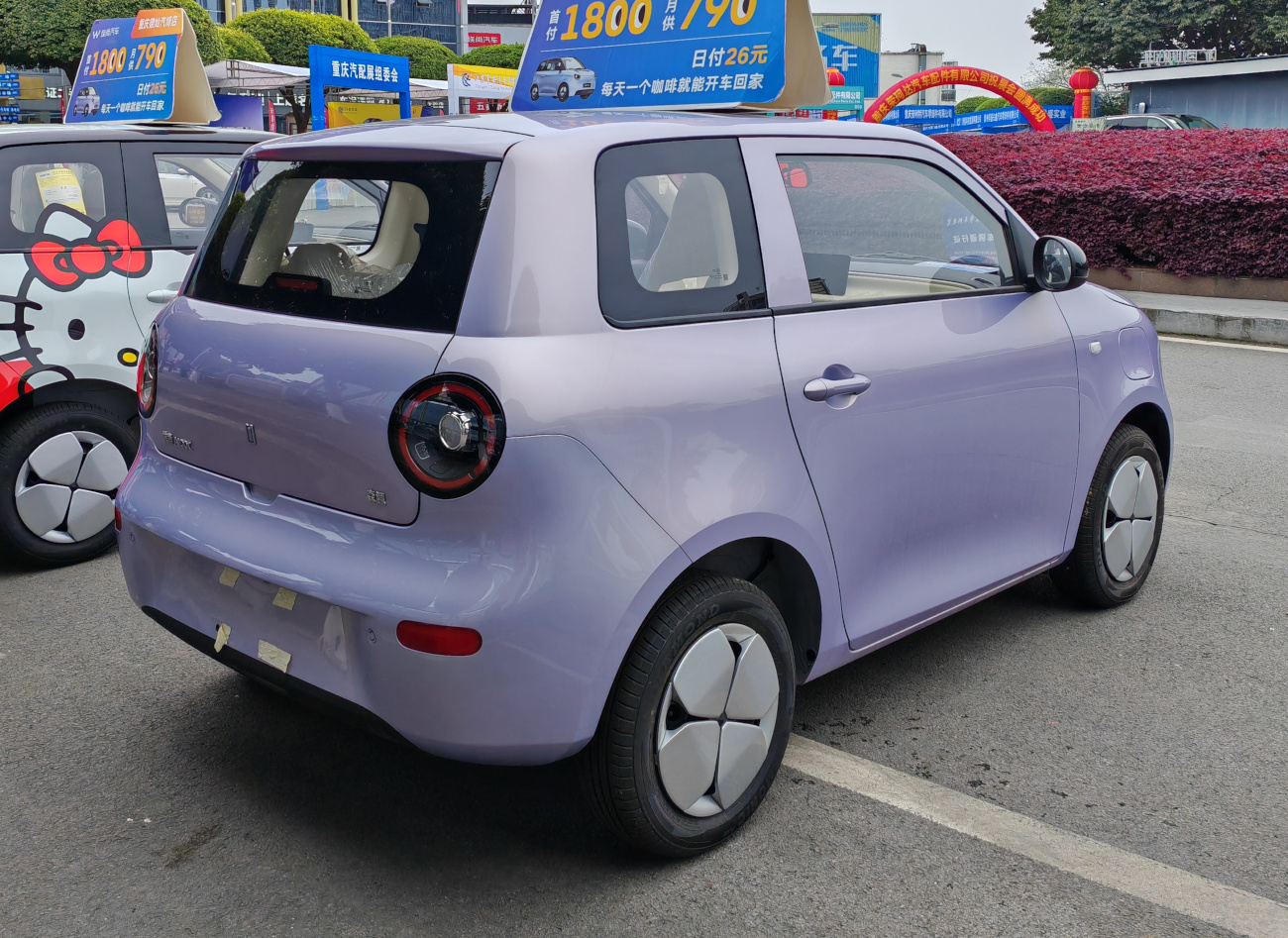
Rear view

The A100C and the Aishang brand in general were created due to the rising demand for small cars in China. The Wuling top manager has described the A100C as a "strategic opportunity to enter the low-cost passenger car market with a new product". The A100C front end has been compared to the Changan Lumin, with some saying that the A100C is essentially "an angry version of the Lumin".

=== Design and features ===
The exterior design is simple and is similar to the Changan Lumin city car that it was based on. The A100C interior does not use a center console, but a center armrest is optional. An instrument panel and touchscreen come standard. It is also equipped with a front-view camera. There are physical controls for the air conditioning.

== Powertrain ==
The A100C is exclusively available in rear-wheel-drive. The motor produces 47 hp (35 kW; 48 PS) and 83 N⋅m (61 lb⋅ft) of torque. Gotion supplies the A100C's battery, which uses a lithium iron phosphate chemistry and has a capacity of 17.65 kWh. It can go 220 kilometres (137 mi) in a single charge and can fast-charge from 30–80% in 30 minutes.
