= Changan Lumin =

Battery electric city car

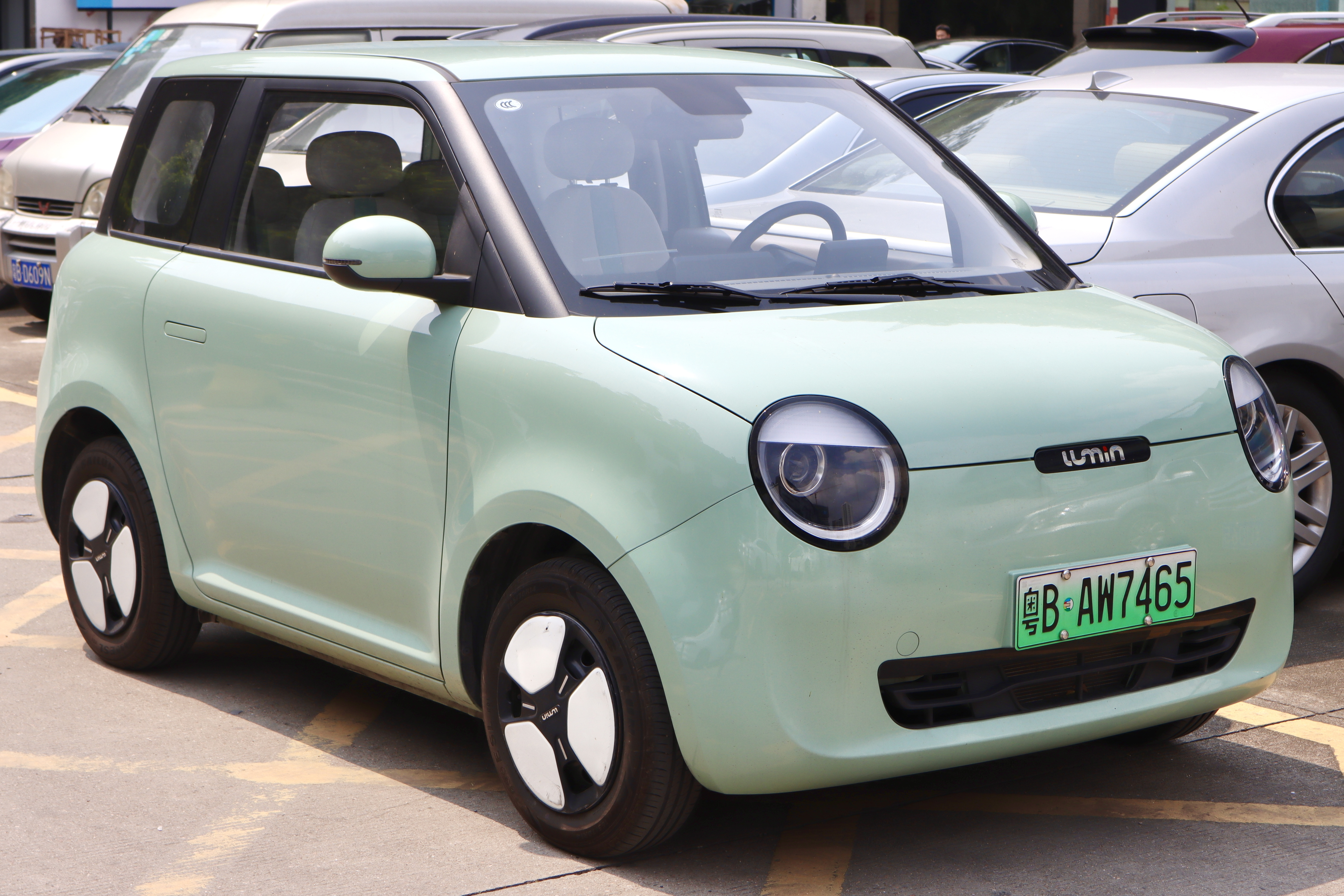

Overview
- Manufacturer: Changan Automobile
- Model code: A158
- Production: 2022–present
- Assembly: China: Chongqing

Body and chassis
- Class: City car (A)
- Body style: 3-door hatchback; 5-door hatchback (Plus)
- Layout: Front-motor, front-wheel-drive
- Platform: EPA0
- Related: Aishang A100C

Powertrain
- Electric motor: Permanent magnet motor
- Power output: 41–48 hp (31–36 kW)
- Battery: 12.9 kWh LFP battery CATL; 17.7 kWh LFP Gotion; 28.1 kWh LFP CATL
- Electric range: 155–301 km (96–187 mi)

Dimensions
- Wheelbase: 1,980 mm (78.0 in)
- Length: 3,270 mm (128.7 in)
- Width: 1,700 mm (66.9 in)
- Height: 1,545 mm (60.8 in)
- Curb weight: 840–945 kg (1,852–2,083 lb)

The Changan Lumin is a battery electric city car produced by Changan Automobile.

== Overview ==
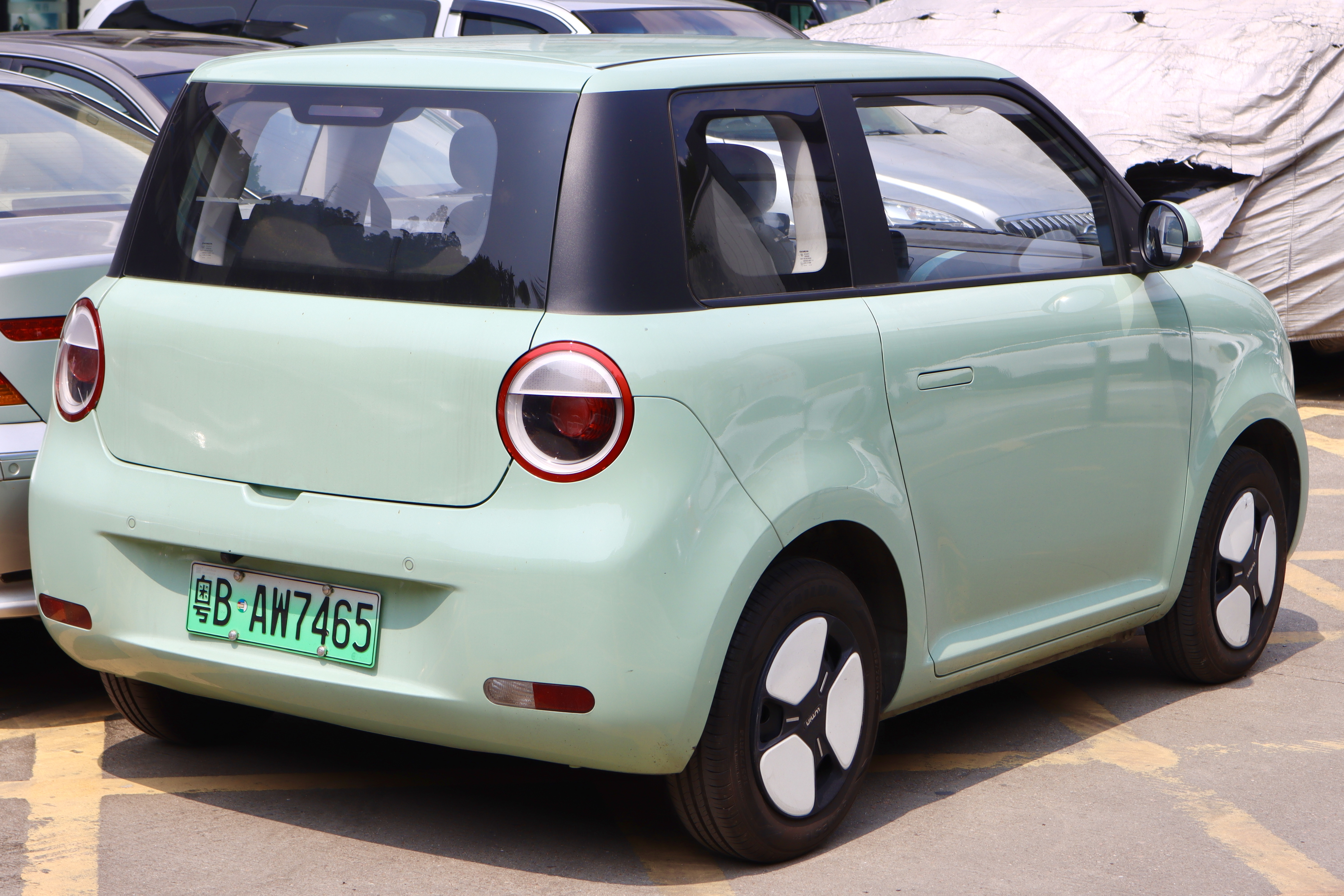
Rear view

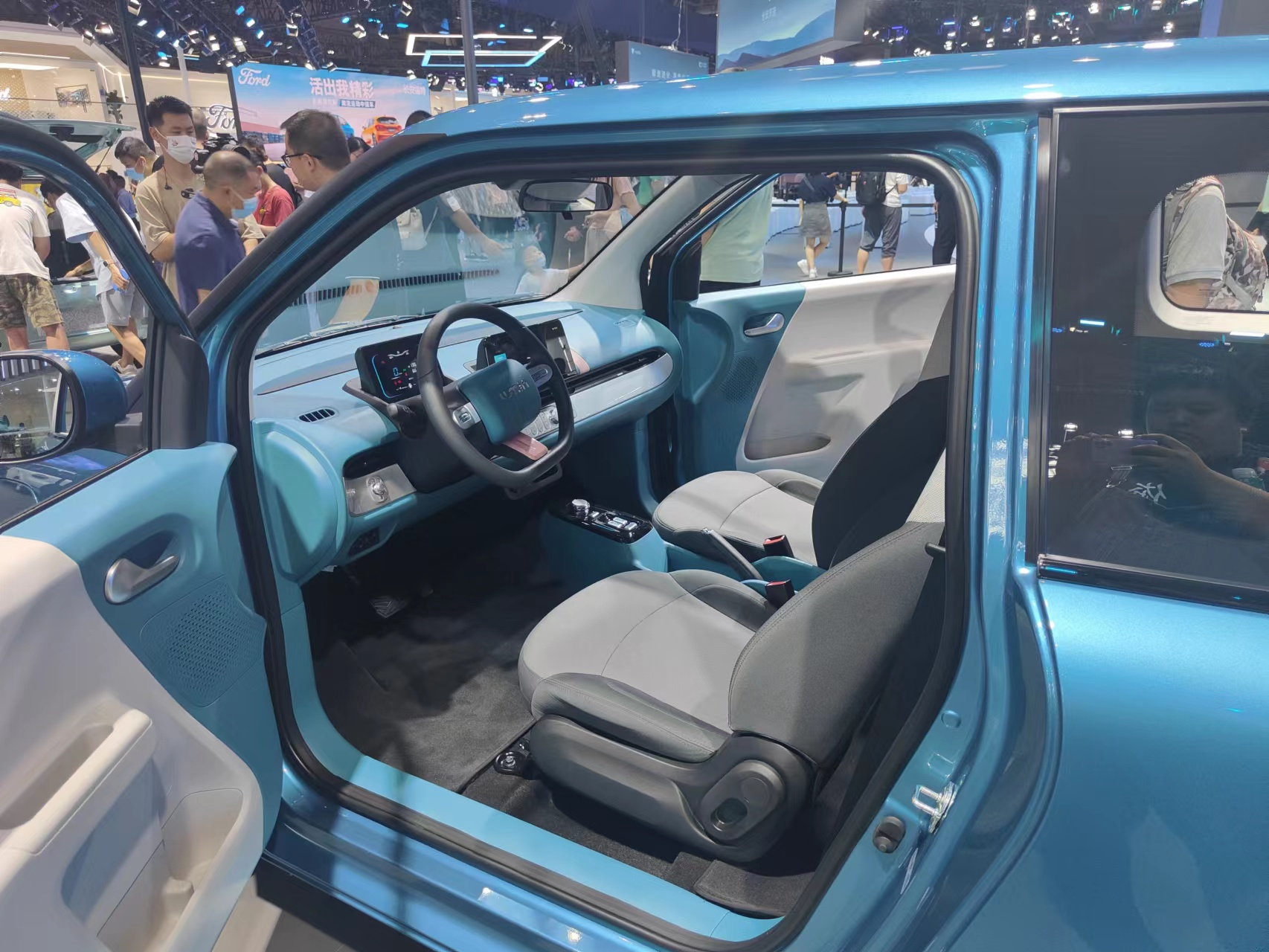
Interior

In April 2022, the Changan was unveiled a new city car, creating a new Lumin model line dedicated to affordable electric cars. The small three-door model has been kept in a modern design, distinguished by a round silhouette with characteristic, round headlights and taillights and a two-tone body paint. The modular EPA0 platform made it possible to create space in the cabin for four passengers.

The interior of the Lumin has a simple, minimalist design that has minimal features and controls. The dashboard has an optional 260 mm (10.25 in) touchscreen multimedia system, and the standard equipment includes radio, navigation, connectivity with smartphone interfaces and adaptive cruise control.

The Lumin was built for the domestic Chinese market, where sales began two months after its debut in June 2022. It is positioned as a low-cost city car, with a price starting at 48,900 yuan at its debut, and competing in a popular market in China.

By late 2026, the Changan expanding the Lumin range by it's 5 door version, called as the Changan Lumin Plus.

== Markets ==
=== Indonesia ===
The Lumin was launched in Indonesia on 21 November 2025 at the 2025 Gaikindo Jakarta Auto Week, as one of Changan's first models sold in Indonesia alongside the Deepal S07. It is available in the sole unnamed variant powered by the 27.98 kWh battery pack.

=== Thailand ===
The Lumin was launched in Thailand on 25 March 2024, with two variants using the 27.98-28.08 kWh battery packs.

== Specifications ==
The Lumin is an electric car for a typical urban purpose, which went on sale with an electric motor with a power of 41 hp (31 kW; 42 PS), allowing for a maximum speed of 101 km/h (63 mph). The vehicle is available with two battery packs supplied by the Chinese company CATL, distinguished by a capacity of 12.92 kWh or 17.7 kWh, while in international markets gets larger 28.1 kWh. The first package allows drivers to drive about 155 km (96 mi) on a single charge, and the more expensive one has a range of up to 210 km (130 mi) on a single charge, and the largest 28.1 kWh can be ranged up to 301 km (187 mi).

== Sales and production ==
Year	Sales		Total production
Year	China	Thailand (Note: Figures based on registration (Thailand))	Total production
2022	59,679	—	70,267
2023	136,764	—	144,481
2024	145,142	295	141,246
2025	158,535	3,252	193,644
