= Guangxi Automobile Group =

Vehicle manufacturer in Liuzhou, Guangxi, China

Guangxi Automobile Group Co., Ltd
- Native name: 广西汽车集团有限公司
- Type: State-owned enterprise
- Industry: Automotive
- Predecessor: Liuzhou Power Machinery Factory (1958-1961); Liuzhou Tractor Factory (1961-1982); Liuzhou Microcar Factory (1982-1996); Liuzhou Wuling Automobile (Wuling Group) (1996 to 2015)
- Founded: 2015; 11 years ago
- Headquarters: Liuzhou, Guangxi, China
- Area served: Worldwide
- Products: Electric vehicles, trucks, buses, engines
- Owners: State-owned Assets Supervision and Administration Commission of Government of Guangxi Zhuang Autonomous Region
- Subsidiaries: Wuling Motors (56.54%); Liuzhou Wuling Automobile Industry (60.9%); Liuzhou Wuling New Energy Vehicle (70%); SAIC-GM-Wuling (5.9%)
- Website: www.wuling.com.cn

Guangxi Automobile Group, previously known as Liuzhou Wuling Motors (柳州五菱), or Wuling Group (五菱集团), is a state-owned automotive enterprise based in Liuzhou, Guangxi, China, established in May 2015 and with a history dating back to 1958. It engages in automobile manufacturing, engine manufacturing, and auto parts manufacturing.

Guangxi Automobile Group currently operates Wuling brand (commercial branch), and Linxys brand, an electric commercial vehicle centered brand.

Guangxi Automobile Group also licenses Wuling brand to SAIC-GM-Wuling, the joint venture, to build passenger vehicles.

== History ==
Over the course of more than 60 years, the company underwent three transformative phases, evolving from tractor production to minivan manufacturing and then to group-based operations.

In 1958, Liuzhou Power Machinery Factory officially settled in Hexi Village, a suburb of Liuzhou. It began to produce marine engines, and later independently developed and produced tractors.

The predecessor of Guangxi Automobile Group was the Liuzhou Tractor Factory, established in 1961, initially focused on producing the Fengshou 37 tractor. By the mid-1970s, the Liuzhou Tractor Factory had become the only local factory among the top eight tractor factories nationwide. However, with the reform and opening up of China, tractor sales declined, leading the factory into difficulties. In the face of adversity, the Liuzhou Tractor Factory successfully transitioned from tractor manufacturing to minivan production.

=== Rise of Wuling Minivans ===
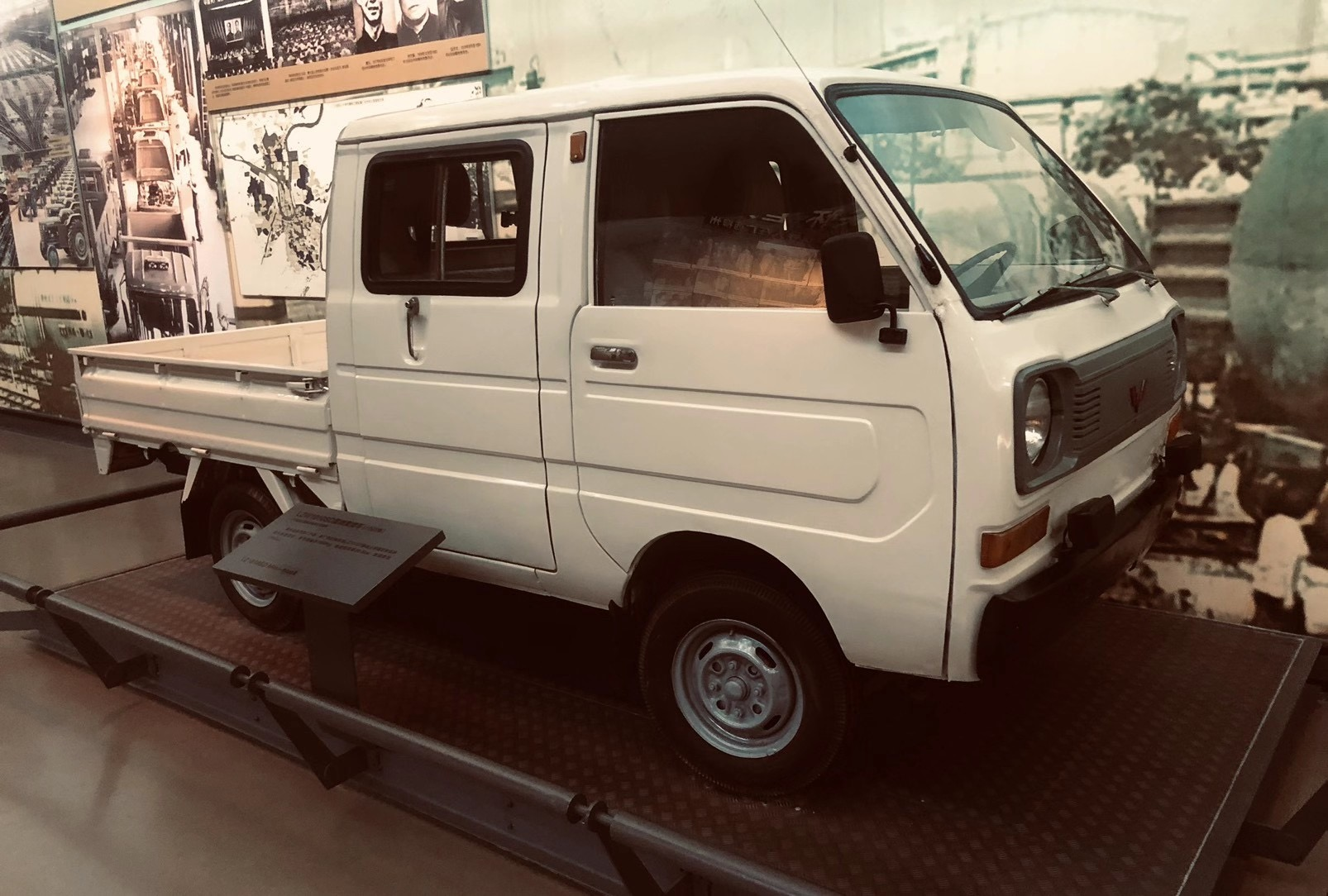
Wuling LZ110, the first microvan of Wuling

In the early 1980s, the Chinese minivan market was still in its infancy. In 1980, the Liuzhou Tractor Factory director, Ding Shu, secured a minivan prototype. Despite lacking precise measurement tools and manufacturing equipment, Wuling employees, through persistent efforts, manually measured, drew blueprints, and machined parts using mismatched machine tools. After two years of reverse engineering of Mitsubishi Minicab, they developed and produced China's first minivan, the Wuling LZ110. This achievement granted Wuling the domestic production qualification for minivans, leading to the renaming of the Liuzhou Tractor Factory to Liuzhou Light Vehicle. Wuling minivans quickly rose to prominence in the domestic market, becoming a leading enterprise in the Chinese minivan industry. From 1988 onwards, after Liuzhou Light Vehicle purchased license from Mitsubishi, Wuling vans are no longer illegal copies made on a large scale.

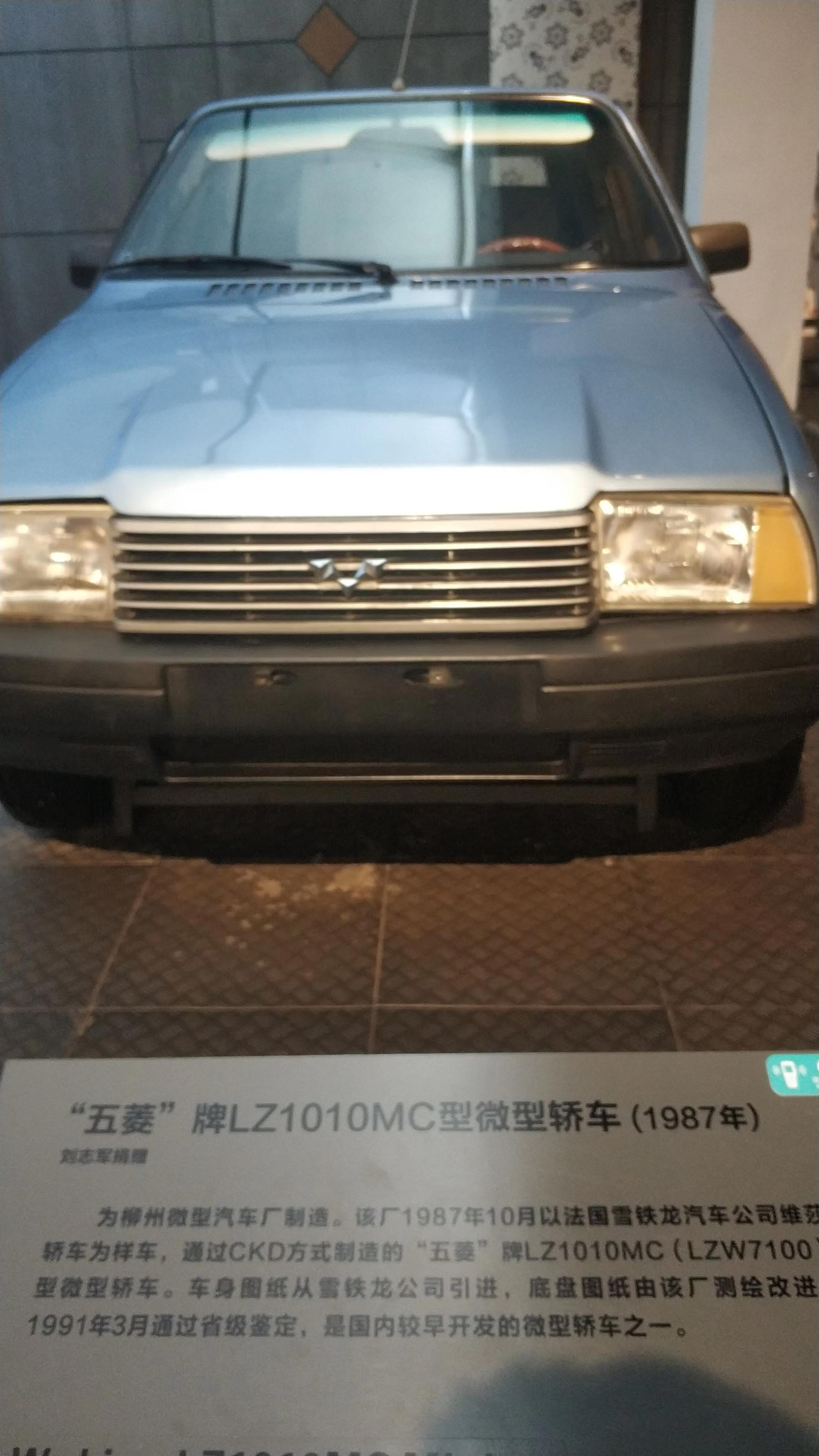
Wuling Visa, built with Citroen's production line

In 1988, Wuling manages to take over the remaining stock and production line of Citroen Visa when the production comes to an end. The first 200 Visas have bodywork from Europe, but Citroen does not send any engines, so a 1-liter three-cylinder engine from Tianjin Xiali is mounted. Just under 1000 Chinese Visas are sold between 1991 and 1994, after which Wuling's passenger car production comes to a halt again.

In 1996, Liuzhou Wuling Automobile Co., Ltd. was established, signifying the formal establishment of Wuling Group. In 1998, Wuling minivans reached a production and sales volume of 100,000 units, making it a leading enterprise in the domestic minivan industry.

=== Wuling Group and SAIC-GM-Wuling ===
With intensified market competition, Wuling Group faced challenges in terms of funds, management, and technology. To adapt to market changes, Wuling Group collaborated with SAIC Motor Corporation and General Motors to establish the first three-way joint venture in China, the SAIC-GM-Wuling Automobile (SGMW).

SGMW was formally established on November 18, 2002. The shareholding ratio of the three parties is: SAIC 50.1%, GM 34%, and Wuling Group 15.9%.

In 2009, Wuling Group sold GM an additional 10% in the joint venture order to introduce passenger car technology from GM for the Baojun brand. The current shareholding ratios of the three parties are SAIC 50.1%, GM 44%, and Wuling 5.9%.

After the establishment of SGMW, the original vehicle manufacturing-related assets of Wuling Group were moved into the joint venture. Wuling Group set up a new company the Liuzhou Wuling Automobile Industry (Wuling Industry 五菱工业), to undertake auto parts manufacturing for SAIC-GM-Wuling and became a downstream enterprise of SAIC-GM-Wuling.

This marked a new development stage for Wuling Group, presenting both challenges and opportunities as it split into "two Wulings" (SAIC-GM-Wuling and Wuling Group) during this transformative period. SAIC-GM-Wuling is responsible for vehicle manufacturing, and Wuling Group (through Wuling Industry) is responsible for parts supply

=== The gain and loss after the establishment of SAIC-GM-Wuling ===
For Wuling Group, the establishment of SAIC-GM-Wuling (SGMW) has sparked widespread controversy.

- The creation of SGMW has been perceived by the management and employees of Wuling Group as the loss of state-owned assets, encountering significant opposition before the formation of the joint venture.
- Wuling Group's excellent assets, including complete vehicle manufacturing capabilities, have all been transferred to the joint venture company, resulting in the loss of its qualification for passenger vehicle manufacturing. As of 2023, the successor Guangxi Auto still does not have the qualification to manufacture passenger vehicles.
- In the equity structure of SGMW, Wuling Group initially held only 15.9% of the shares, placing it in a weak position. In 2009, General Motors further acquired an additional 10% of the shares, reducing Wuling's stake to 5.9%. As a result, Wuling's profits from the joint venture became increasingly meager.
- SGMW has established a direct supply chain at Liuzhou, where the headquarters of Wuling Group is located, directly competing with Wuling Group. Wuling's original position as a component supply enterprise for the joint venture faces renewed challenges.

However, the joint venture also brought new chances.

- After the split of Wuling Group and SGMW, some critics believe that the gratuitous transfer of shares to the joint venture has caused significant losses for the Government of Liuzhou. In reality, the "Wuling" trademark has always been controlled by Wuling Group (current Guangxi Auto), only licensed for use by SGMW. Moreover, the headquarters and factory of SGMW are also located in Liuzhou. By taking a step back, Wuling Group may seem to have lost some benefits, but what they gained is a deep integration between SGMW and Liuzhou.
- The split of Wuling Group has further refined the automotive industry chain in Liuzhou. The strong vehicle manufacturing capabilities of SGMW, coupled with the comprehensive automotive parts production capabilities of Wuling Group, along with the accommodating attitude of the Liuzhou municipal government towards manufacturing enterprises, have made Liuzhou a city with a distinct automotive manufacturing gene. Dongfeng, FAW, China National Heavy Duty Truck Group (Sinotruk), and SAIC have all established vehicle assembly plants in Liuzhou. As of now, Liuzhou remains the only city in the country with assembly plants from all four major automotive groups.

=== The birth of Guangxi Automobile Group ===
After Wuling Motors has largely sold its automotive branch to SGMW, in the following years, Wuling Group built a large industrial complex. It splits its activities into three major groups.

In 2001 Wuling Motors United Development was formed. This is the branch that focuses on making all kinds of auto parts. It sets up several joint ventures with reputable international suppliers in the following years, the most famous probably being the French Faurecia company.

In 2003, Liuzhou Wuling Special Vehicle Manufacturing was set up. This business unit makes all kinds of vehicles, also under the Wuling name. This concerns ATVs, carts you encounter on the golf course, airport, or amusement park, modifications of commercial vehicles, and electric buses.

In 2006, the Liuzhou Machinery Factory was renamed as Liuzhou Wuling Liuji Power Company, the company grows into a major supplier of combustion engines. The main customers are the various companies and joint ventures of the SAIC conglomerate, but Wuling Liuji also supplies numerous other Chinese car manufacturers.

In 2007 a major restructuring and partial privatization of Wuling Group followed. The three business units mentioned above consolidated into an umbrella holding company called Liuzhou Wuling Automobile Industry Company, 49% owned by Wuling Group (Guangxi Province) and 51% by Hong Kong investment company Dragon Hill.

In May 2015, under the guidance of Guangxi Government, with Wuling Group as the main entity, several companies including Liuzhou Fangxin, Liuzhou Chantu, Liuzhou Yinhai Aluminum Industry, Guilin National Investment, and Liuzhou Weipeng were introduced as participating shareholders. Wuling Group was officially reorganized and renamed as Guangxi Automobile Group. It controls 60.5% of the shares in the Wuling Automobile Industry. Dragon Hill retains about 13.5%, and the remaining 26 % is traded on the exchange.

Guangxi Automobile Group has now established manufacturing bases in Liuzhou, Guilin, Qingdao, Chongqing, and Guiyang, forming a coordinated network between the northern and southern China. The company has also set sail internationally, establishing overseas component production bases in Indonesia and India. In addition, in 2020, the range has also been expanded to include electric delivery vehicles based on designs already produced by the sister company SGMW, presenting a small van Wuling EV50.

In 2023, Guangxi Auto expanded its car brand portfolio by introducing its second brand, Linxys. It focused on the production of a small family of Golden Van/Golden Truck delivery vehicles with an electrified drive. The new branch was established with the aim of increasing market share and exceeding the production level of 1 million vehicles by 2030.

In late 2025, Guangxi Auto expanded its car brand portfolio again by introducing another brand, Aishang, with the launch of a concept shooting brake and a microcar, the A100C. The A100C features restyled front and rear ends while dimensions are nearly the same as the Changan Lumin. the A100C is powered by a single rear positioned electric motor with a maximum power output of 35 kW and a peak torque of 83 Nm, capable of a top speed of 101 km/h. the A100C is equipped with a 17.65 kWh lithium iron phosphate battery supplied by Gotion, providing an electric range of 220 km under CLTC conditions.

== Subsidiary ==
=== Wuling Motor ===
Wuling Motor Group Holdings (Wuling Motor), a listed entity of Guangxi Automotive Group in Hong Kong (HK.00305). Currently Guangxi Automotive Group holds 56.54% of the stake.

=== Wuling Automobile Industry ===
Liuzhou Wuling Automobile Industry was founded in 2007, it is a company jointly established by Guangxi Automobile Group and Wuling Motor Group Holdings (Wuling Motor) by integrating its original auto parts, engines, and commercial vehicle manufacture bossiness. As of 2023, Guangxi Automotive Group holds 60.9% of the stake.

=== Wuling New Energy ===
Founded in 2021, Wuling New Energy is the subsidiary for developing and producing electric vehicles. New Energy. Guangxi Automobile Group holds 72.04% of the stake, Wuling Motors holds 13.76%, and Wuling Automobile Industry holds 13.51%.

On September 4, 2022, Wuling New Energy and Japan ASF Co., Ltd. held the mass production contract signing ceremony of the G050 microvan project, which marks Guangxi Automobile Group vehicles entering the Japanese market for the first time. Deliveries started in May 2023.

The Linxys brand was officially released at the end of June 2023.

=== SAIC-GM-Wuling ===
SAIC-GM-Wuling is a joint venture between SAIC Motor, General Motors, and Guangxi Automotive Group.

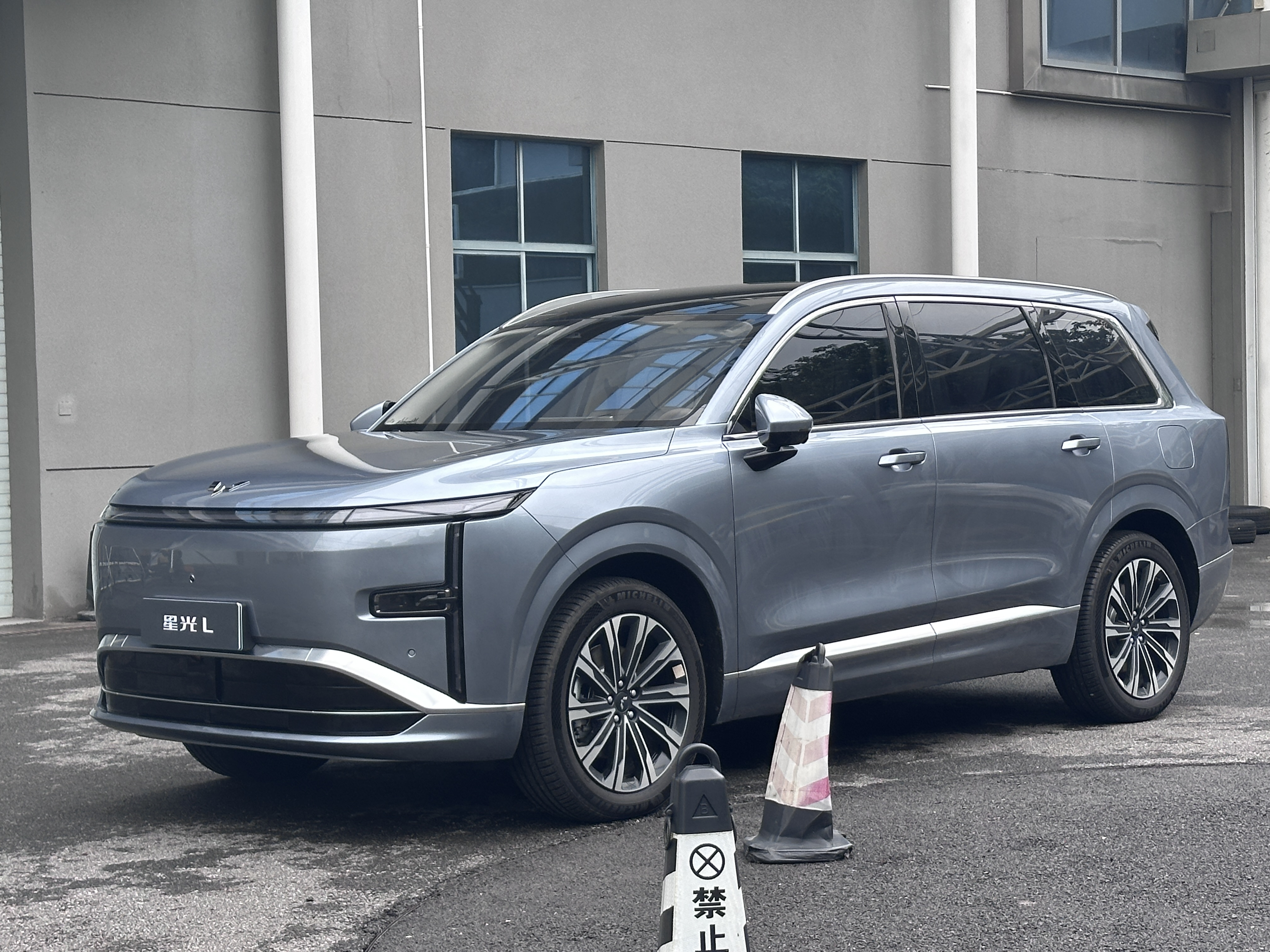
Wuling Starlight L

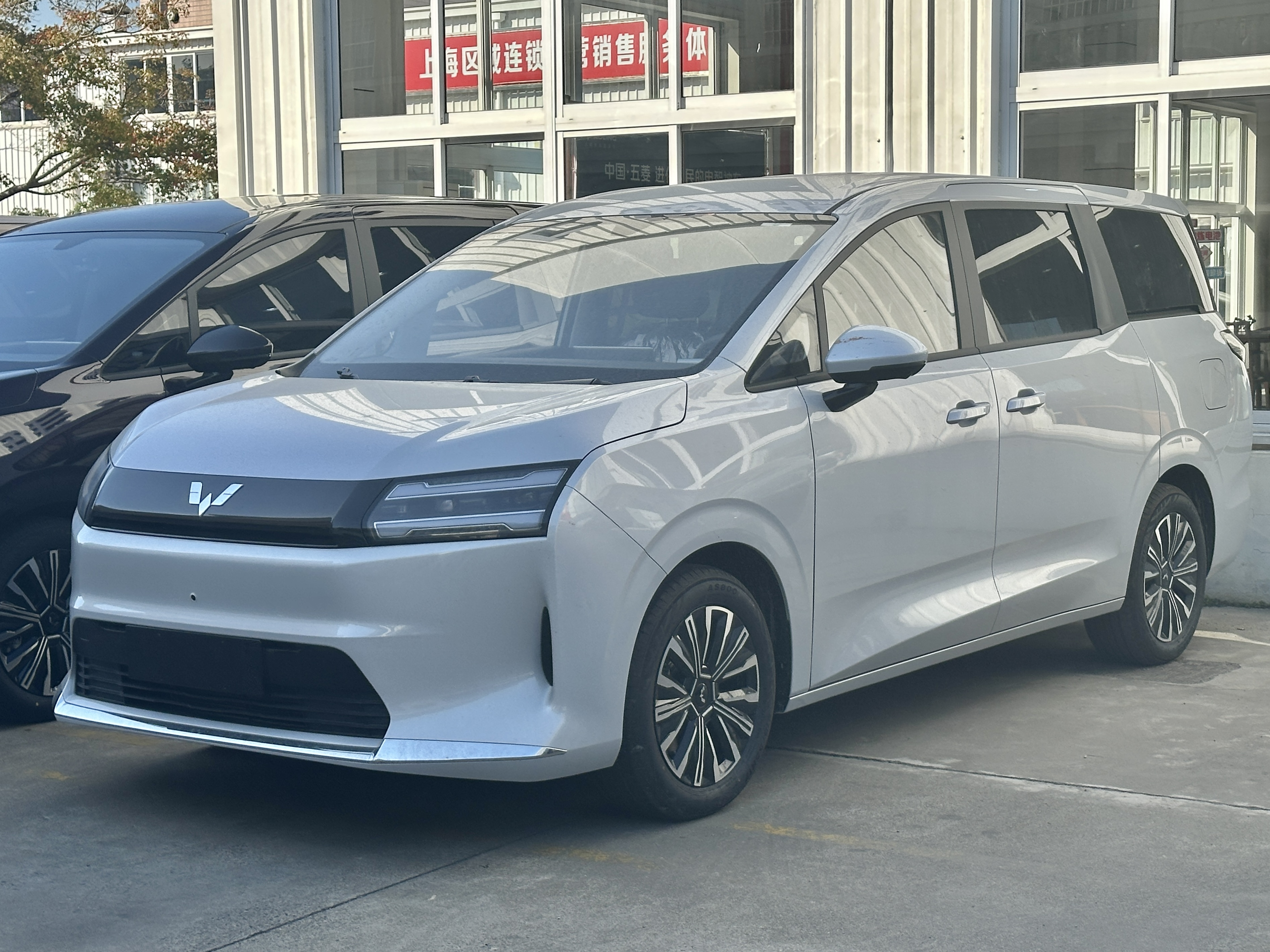
Wuling Starlight 730 EV

== Brands ==
=== Wuling Industry/Wuling Motor ===
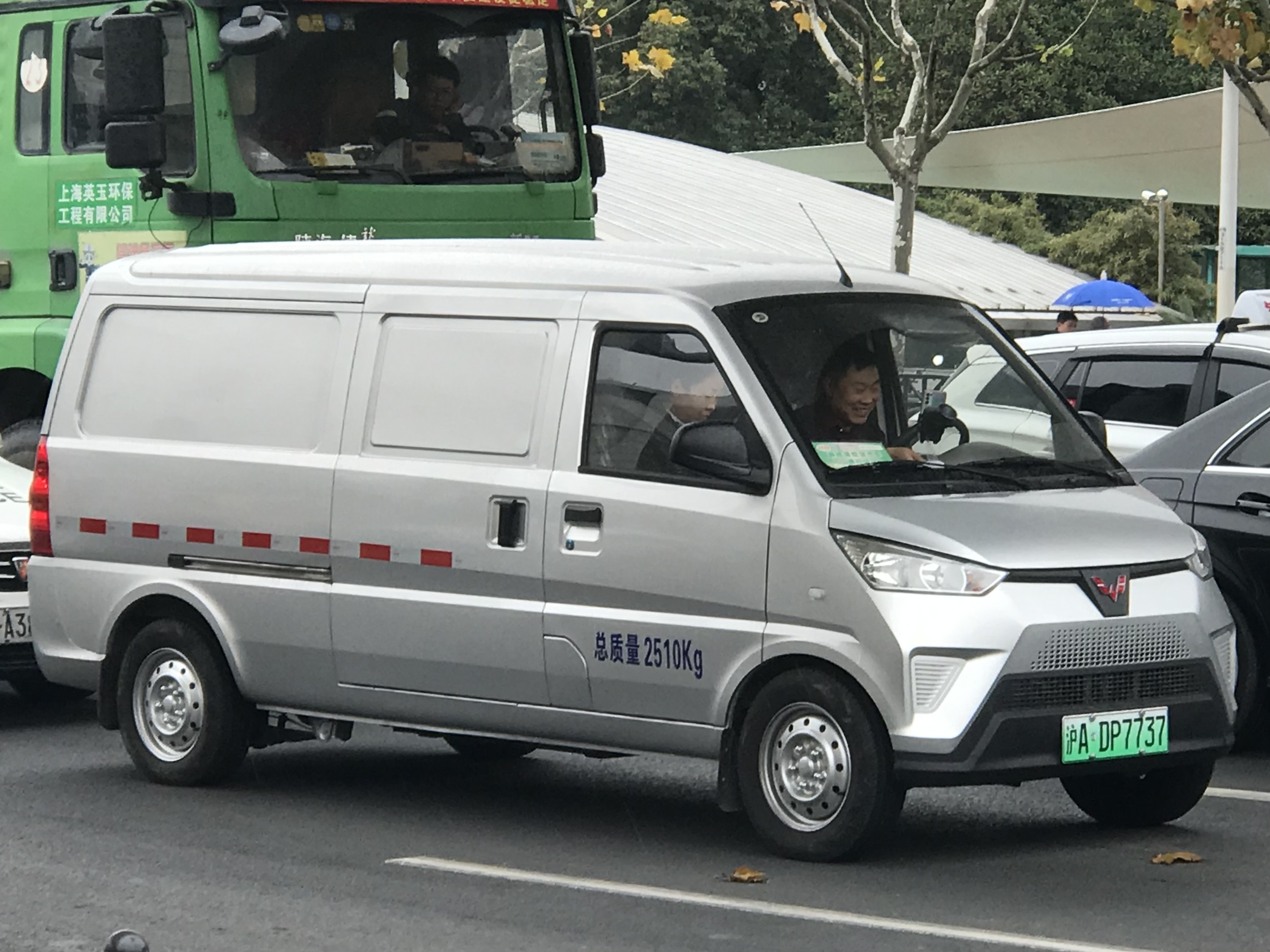
Wuling EV50

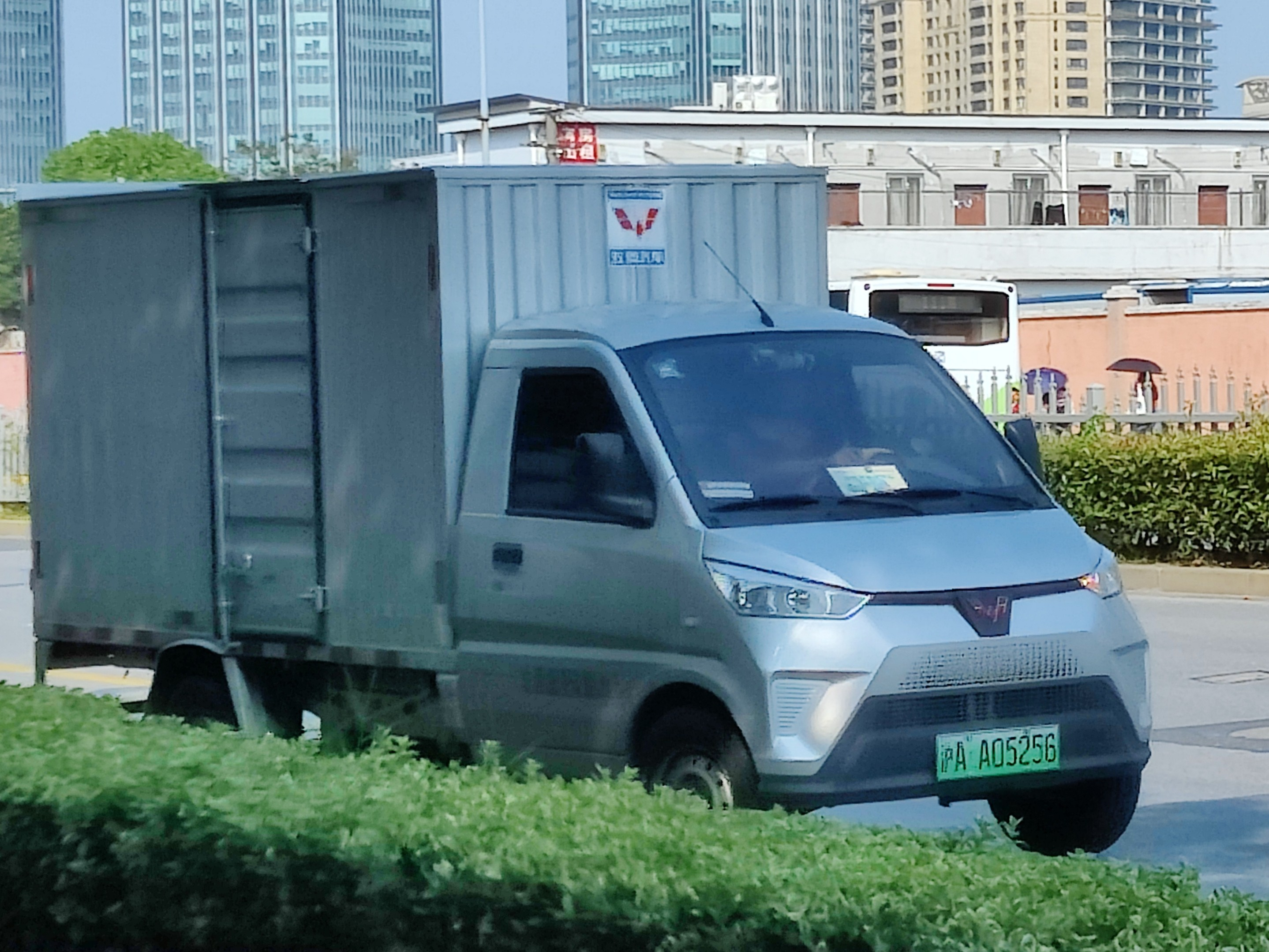
Wuling Dianka

=== Linxys ===
Linxys (菱势) is a brand operated by Wuling New Energy for electric commercial vehicles.

- Linxys Gold Van (2023-present), van, BEV
- Linxys Gold Microtruck (2024-present), pickup truck, BEV
- Linxys Gold Microtruck Plus (2026-present), pickup truck, BEV
- Linxys Gold Big truck (2026-present), pickup truck, BEV
- Linxys Gold Truck (2023-present), pickup truck, EREV
- Linxys G200/ 7S (to commence), compact MPV, PHEV. Originally planned to be launched in 2023 with rumored names G200 and 7S, but was cancelled. As of September 2026, news of the model's MIIT fillings surfaced again with images showing the restyled front end now featuring shared lamp components from the Linxys Gold Van/ truck and labeled as the Forthing Little Lingzhi.
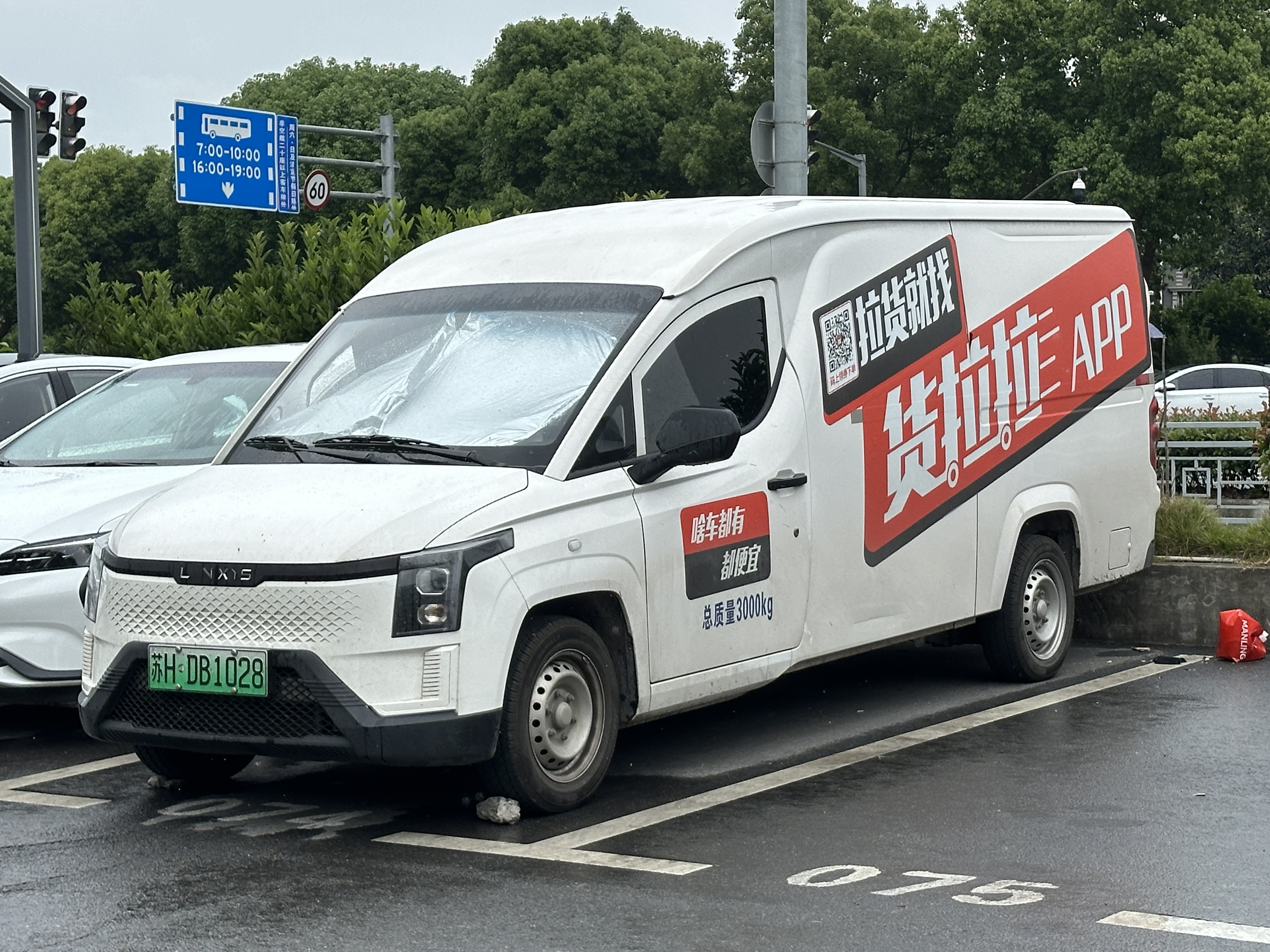
Linxys Gold Van

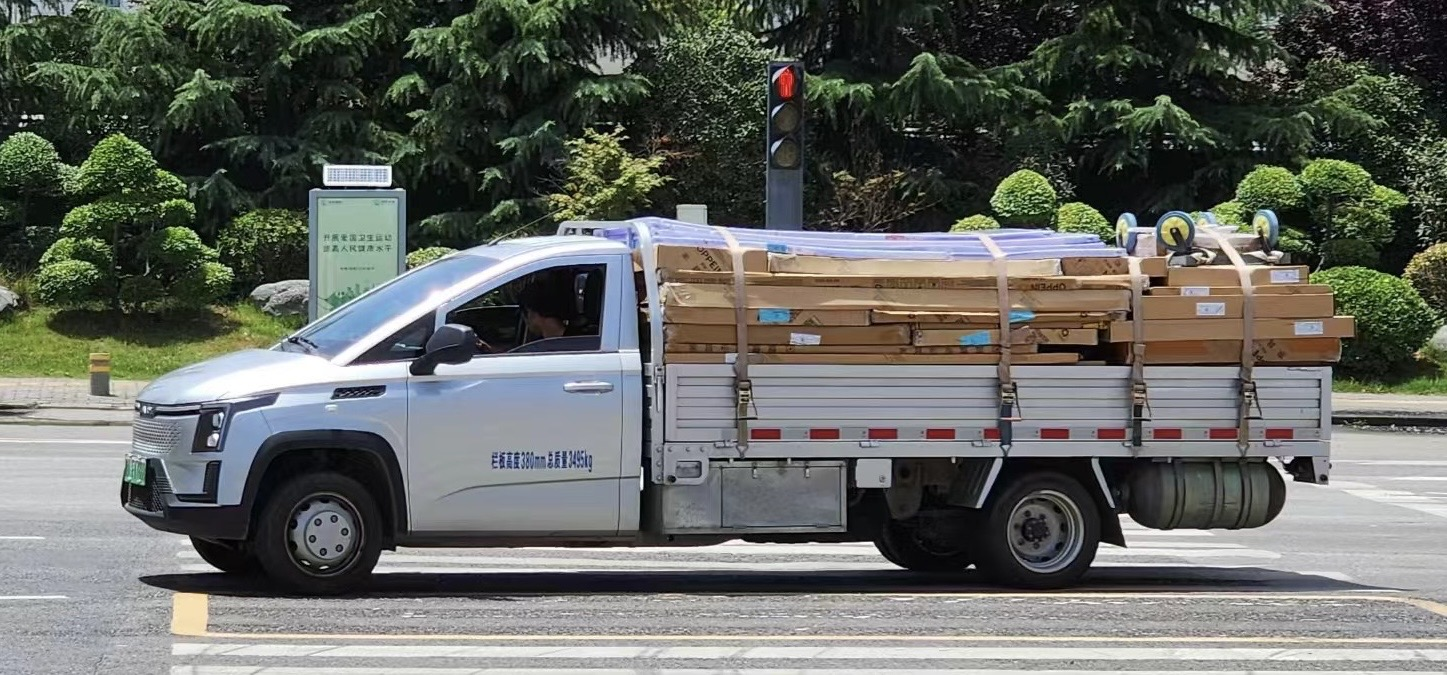
Linxys Gold Truck

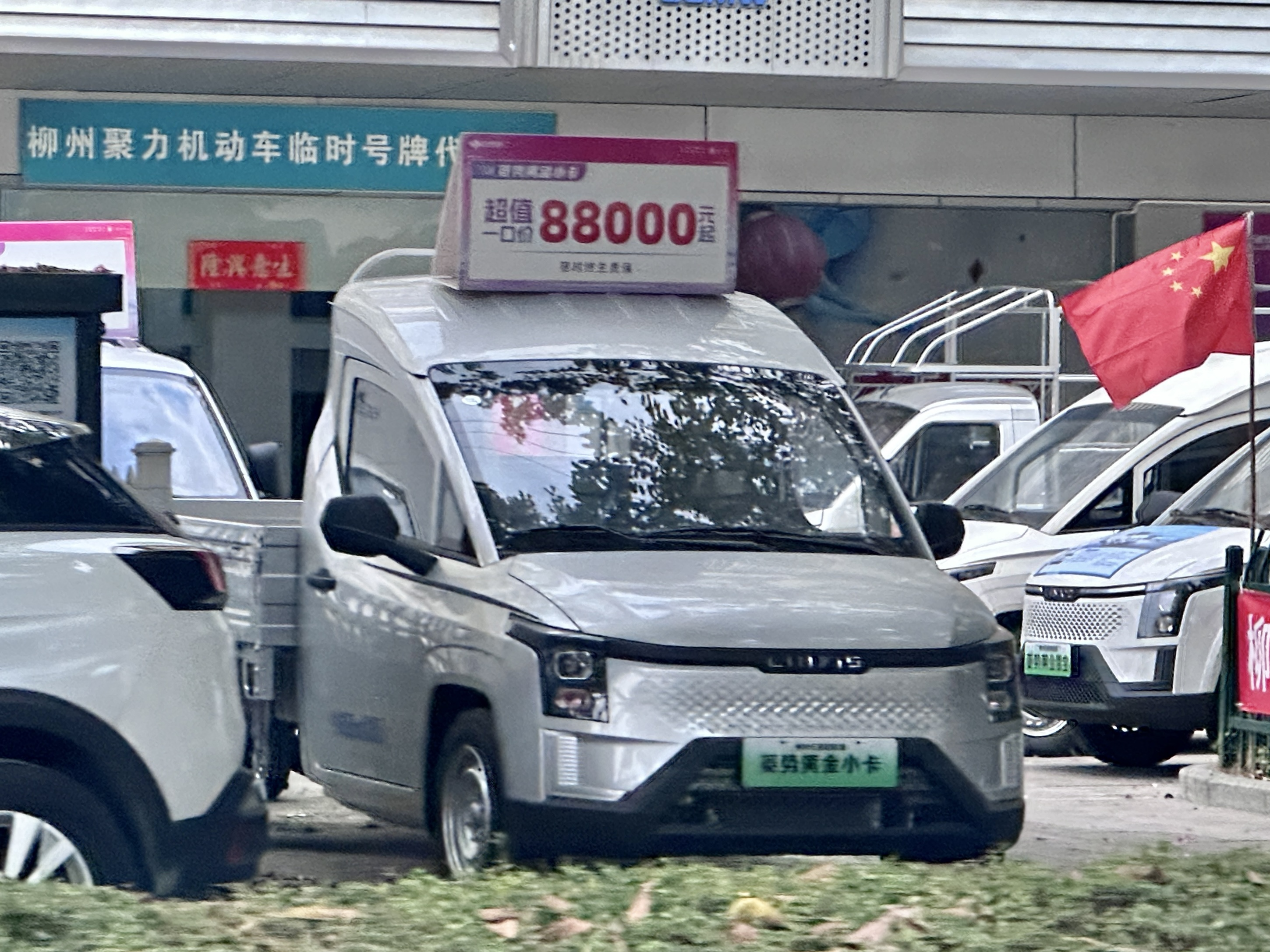
Linxys Gold Microtruck

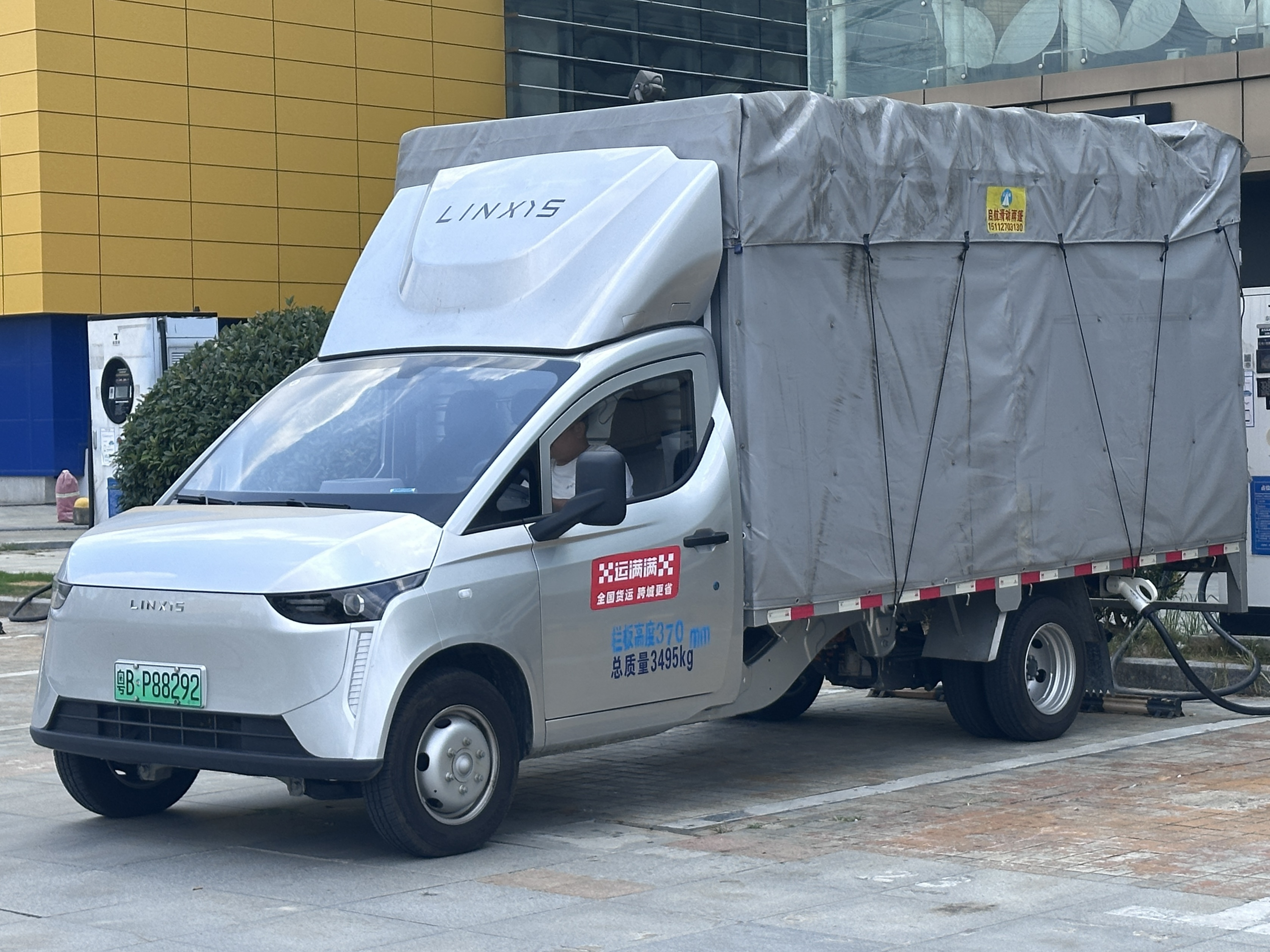
Linxys Gold Big Truck

=== Aishang ===
- Aishang A100C (2025-present), microcar, BEV
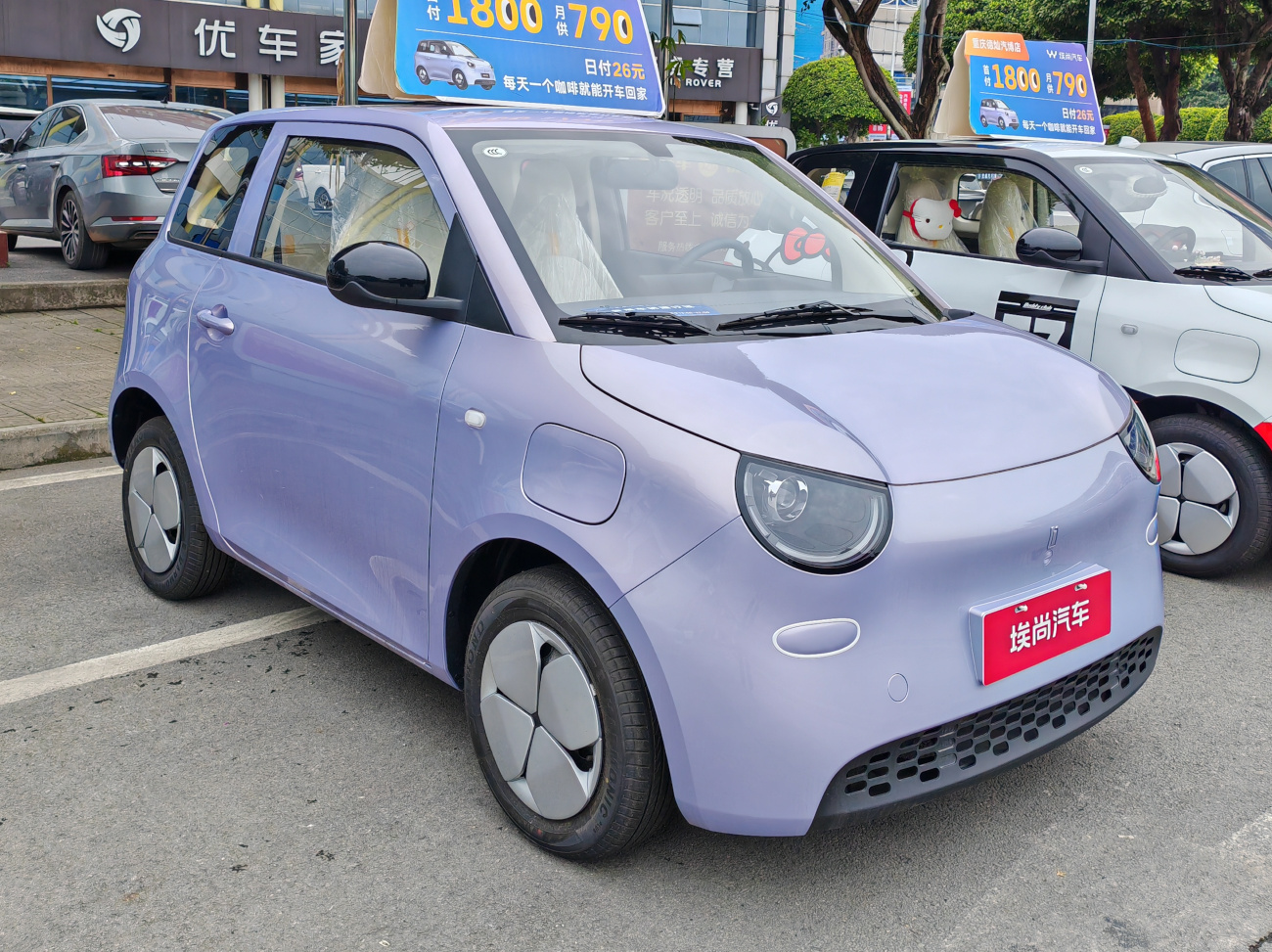
Aishang A100C

== Sales ==
Sales of Guangxi Automobile Group
Year	Total	Wuling Industry	Wuling NEV
2010	33,636	33,636	-
2011	37,000	37,000	-
2012	40,000	40,000	-
2013	47,000	47,000	-
2014	41,000	41,000	-
2015	43,000	43,000	-
2016	43,000	43,000	-
2017	50,000	50,000	-
2018	110,200	110,200	-
2019	116,000	116,000	-
2020	115,000	115,000	-
2021	98,000	98,000	-
2022	75,900	67,600	8,300
2023	43,800	33,800	10,000
2024	21,500	7,300	14,200
2025	27,600	5,600	22,000
