= Wuling Dragon =

Wuling Dragon (Wuling Xingwang)
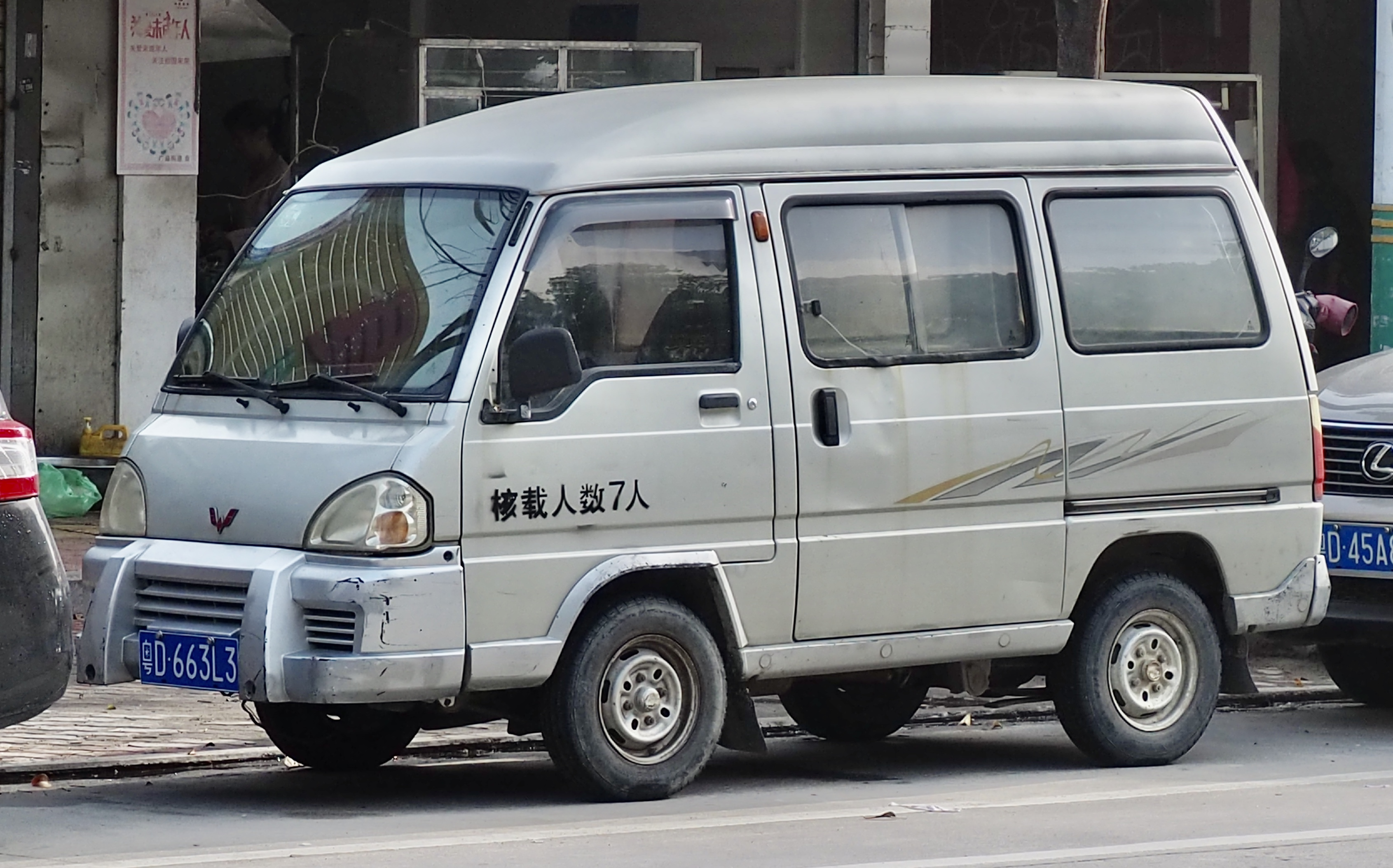

Overview
- Manufacturer: SAIC-GM-Wuling Automobile
- Also called: Wuling LZW 1010, 1020, 6320, 6330, 6332, 6360, 6430; Wuling Xingwang; Wuling 6358NVF
- Production: 1990–2009
- Model years: 1990–2010

Body and chassis
- Class: Microvan; Kei truck
- Body style: Van; Pickup truck
- Related: Mitsubishi Minicab

Powertrain
- Engine: 797 cc F8A I4; 843 cc CD I3; 970 cc LJ462Q3E2 I4; 993 cc CB I3; 1,051 cc LJ465Q3-1 I4; 1,061 cc 4G82 I4
- Transmission: 4 speed manual

Dimensions
- Wheelbase: 1,780 mm (70.1 in) (microvan); 2,010 mm (79.1 in) (single-cab); 2,370 mm (93.3 in) (double-cab)
- Length: 3,500 mm (137.8 in)
- Width: 1,445 mm (56.9 in)
- Height: 1,895 mm (74.6 in)

Chronology
- Predecessor: Liuzhou Wuling LZ110
- Successor: Wuling Sunshine

The Wuling Dragon was a series of cabover microvans and kei trucks made by SAIC-GM-Wuling Automobile, the Chinese joint venture with General Motors of the United States of America. The Dragon is the successor of the earlier Liuzhou Wuling LZ110, which was based on the 1977-1984 Mitsubishi Minicab.

== History ==
Production began around 1990 after an agreement was signed with Mitsubishi to produce the 1984-1991 Mitsubishi Minicab under license, as the Liuzhou Wuling LZW 6320/6430 (bus/van versions) and LZW 1010 (pickup trucks). In 1998 the car received a facelift and became the LZW6330/6332. A seven passenger minivan called the LZW6360 was added in 2003.

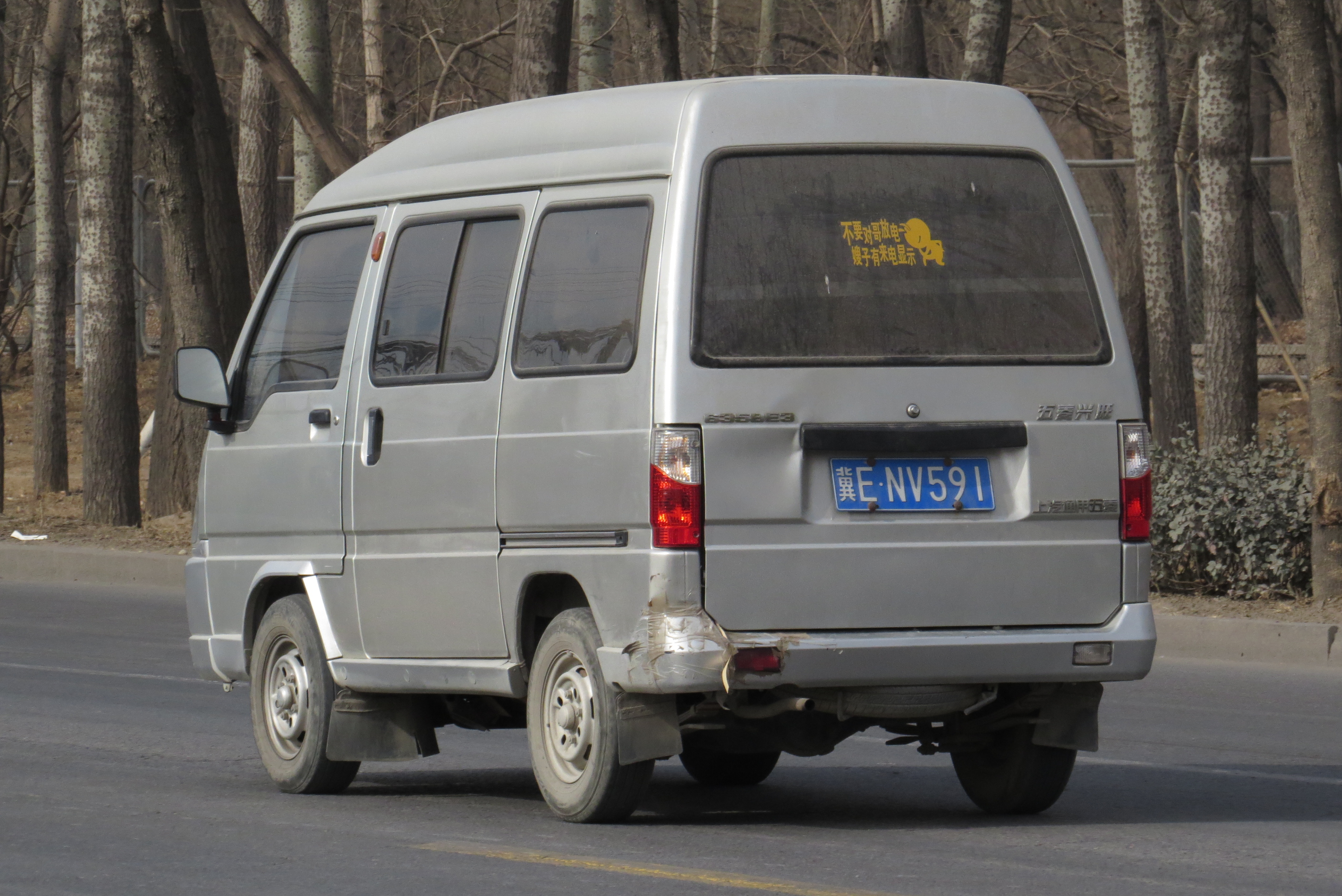
Wuling Xingwang van rear

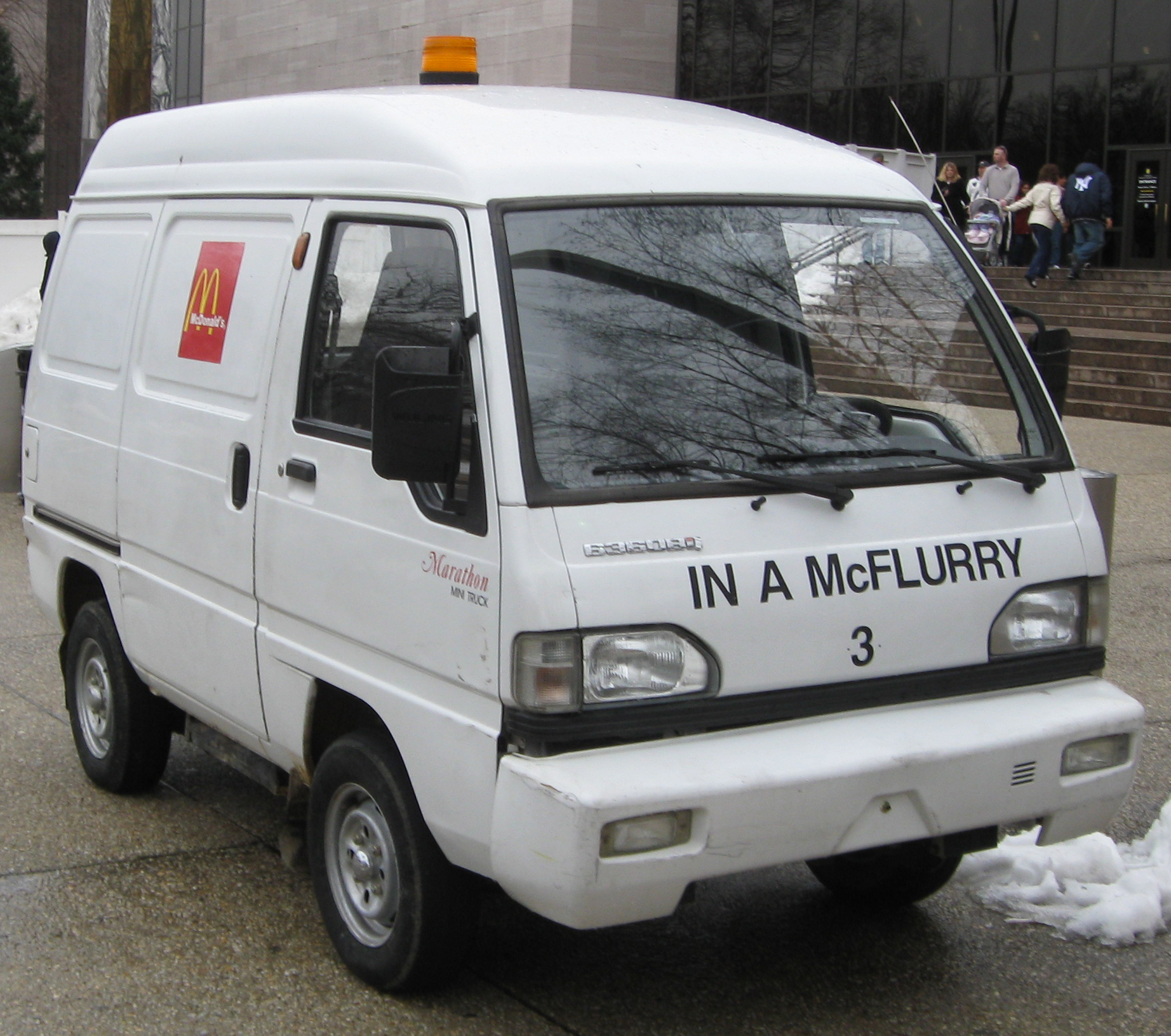
Pre-facelift Wuling Dragon van

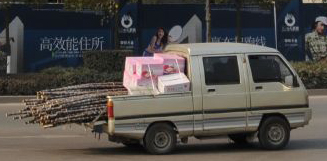
Hard working LZW 1010SD double cab

The engines used were originally a Daihatsu 843 cc three-cylinder and Mitsubishi's 1,061 cc 4G82 four-cylinder (all Chinese built). Since at least 1998 the engines used are 0.8-, 1.0-, and 1.1-litre versions of the old Suzuki F8A/F10A inline fours with 35, 43, and 48 PS (26, 32, and 35 kW) respectively. More recently the 1.1 has been dropped and the power of the smaller engines are increased to 39 and 47 PS (29 and 35 kW). Other engines have also been fitted, such as Daihatsu's 993 cc three-cylinder.

The Dragon is popular as it is of the right size for China's densely populated areas and it is cheaper than most import vehicles into China. The long wheelbase double cab pickup (LZW 1010SD/PSN, more recently LZW 1020PSLNE3) developed by Wuling sits on a longer (237 cm or 93 in) wheelbase and is of 417 cm (164 in) overall length, considerably longer than the 332 cm (131 in) of the microvan version.
