= Wuling LZ110 =

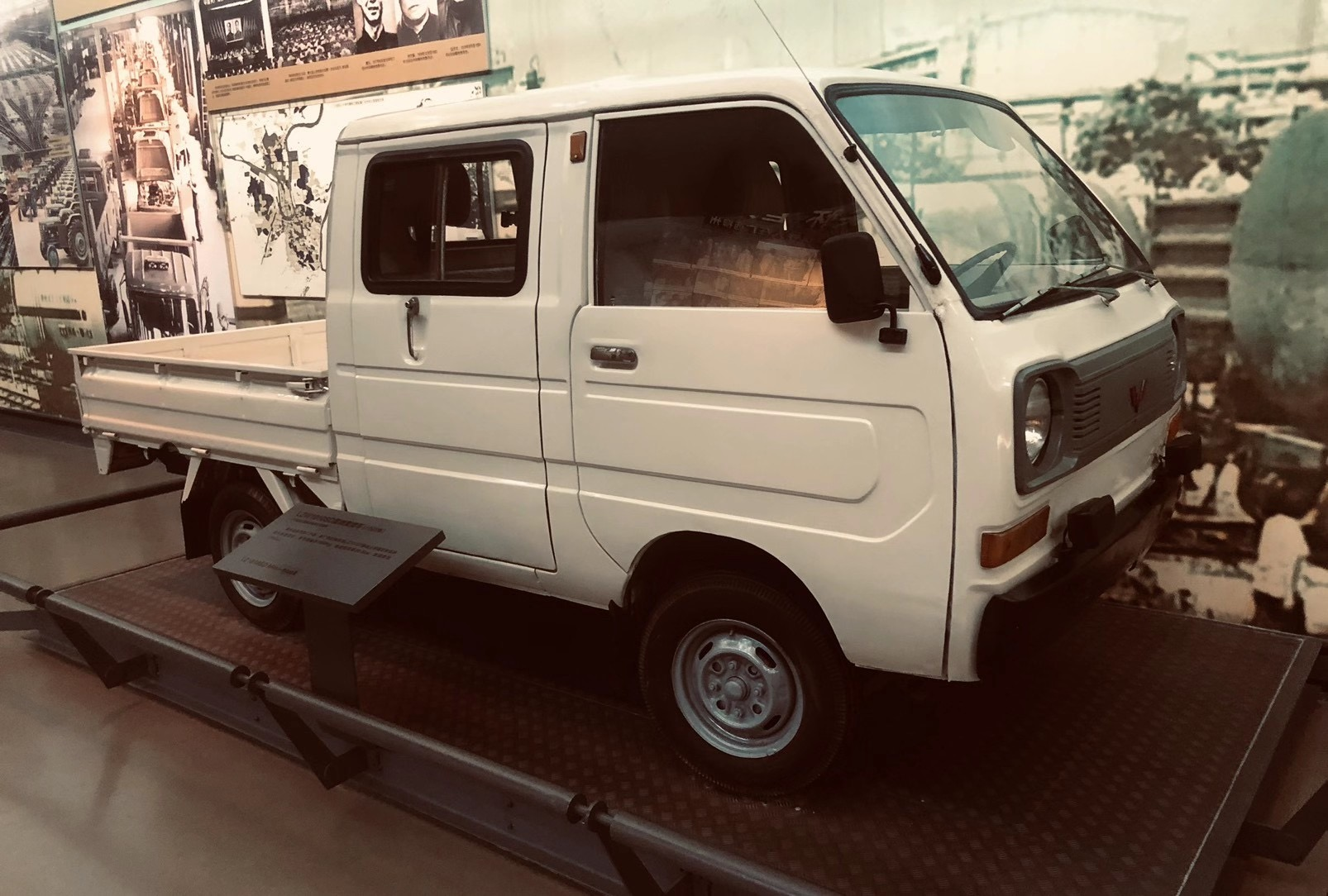

Overview
- Manufacturer: Wuling Motors
- Production: 1984–1990

Body and chassis
- Class: Microvan; Kei truck
- Body style: 5-door microvan 2-door pickup truck 4-door pickup truck
- Related: Mitsubishi Minicab

Powertrain
- Transmission: 5-speed manual

Dimensions
- Wheelbase: 1,760 mm (69.3 in)
- Length: 2,995–3,190 mm (117.9–125.6 in)
- Width: 1,295 mm (51.0 in)
- Height: 1,660–1,900 mm (65.4–74.8 in)

Chronology
- Successor: Wuling Dragon

The Wuling LZ110 is a microvan and kei truck produced by Wuling Motors between 1984 and 1990.

== History ==
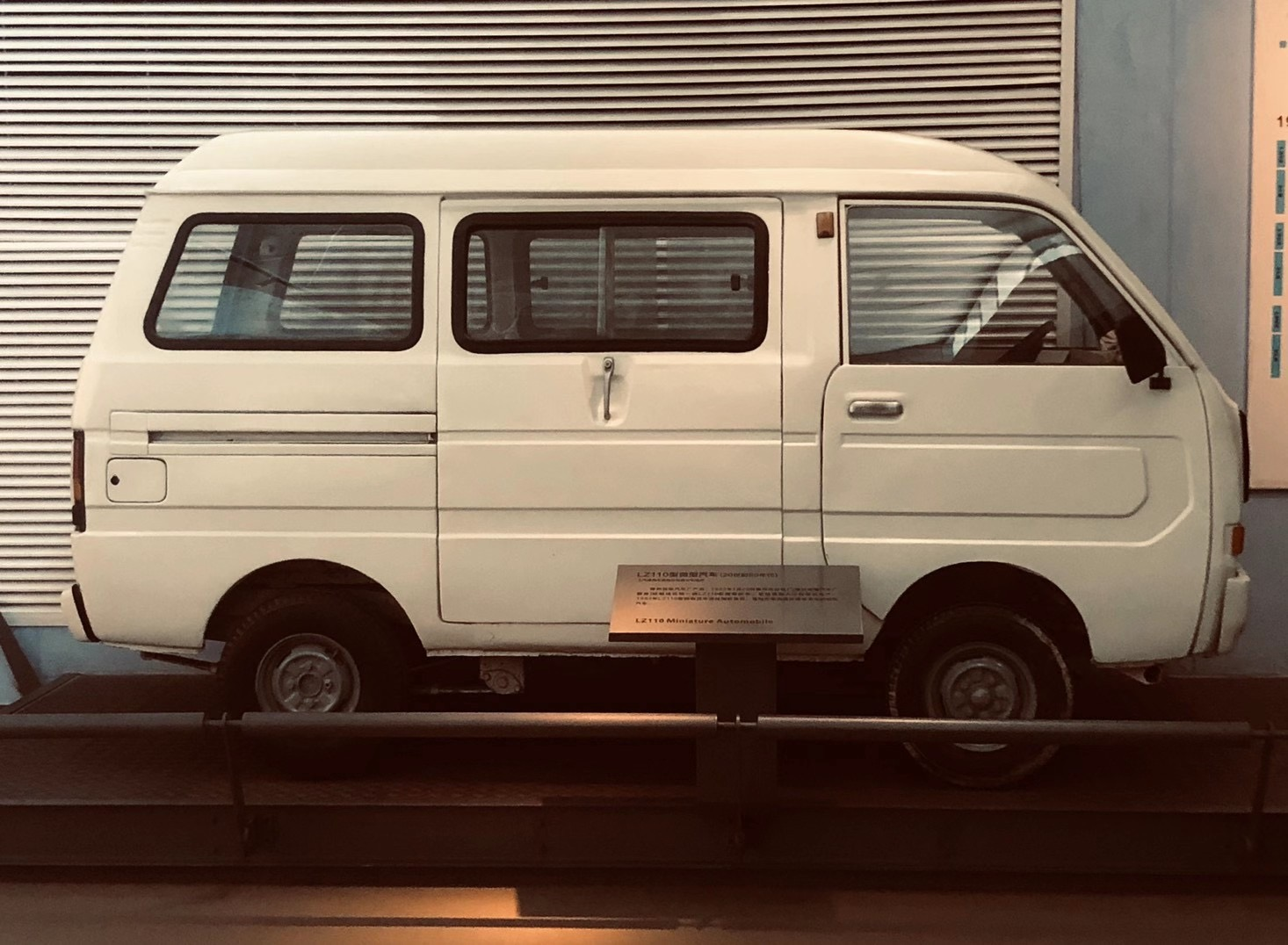
Wuling LZ110 Van

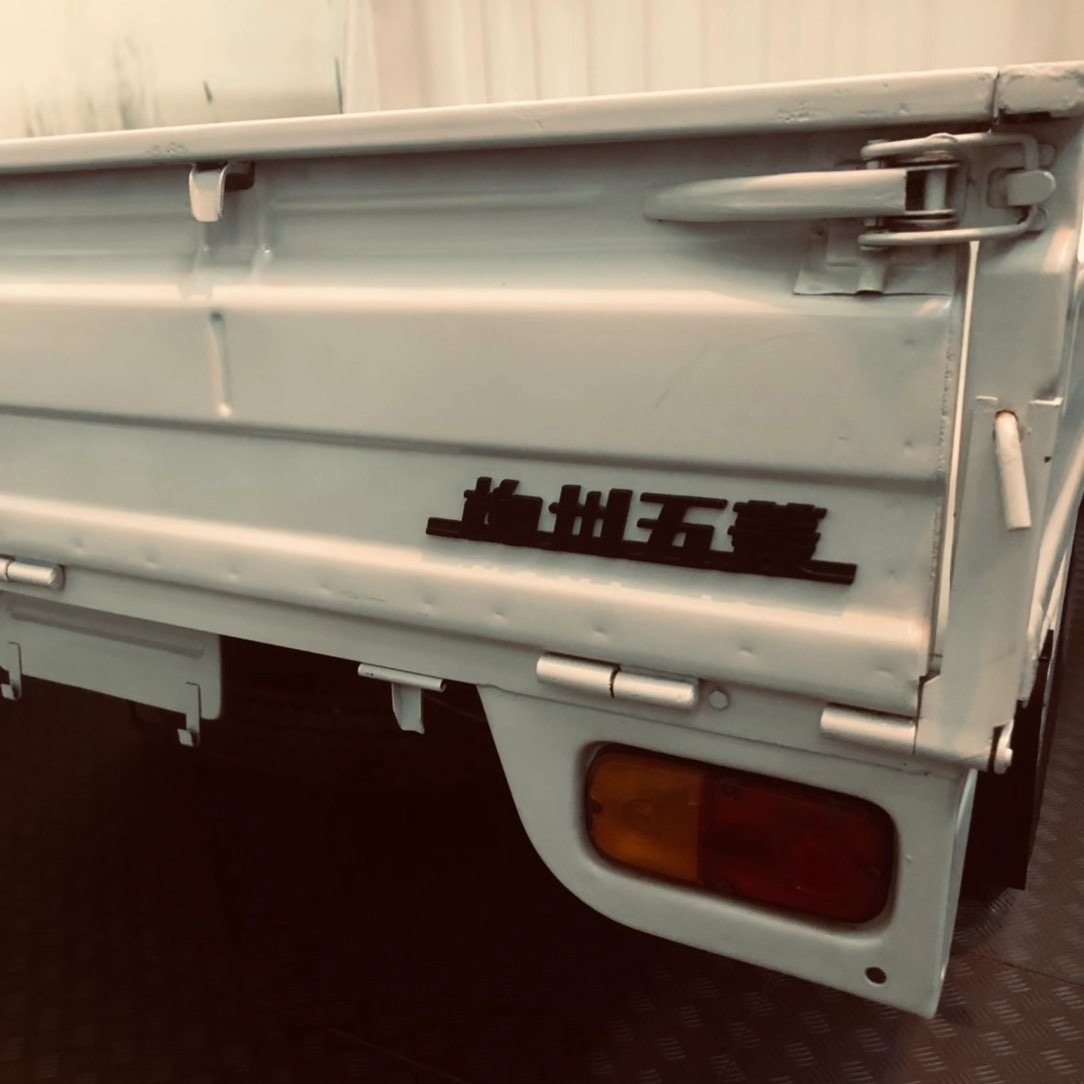
Wuling LZ110 - emblem

The LZ110 small delivery truck went into production in 1984 as the first vehicle in the history of the Chinese company Wuling, originally founded as Liuzhou Wuling Automobile in 1982. In the same year, a license was purchased from the Japanese automaker Mitsubishi Motors for the production of the third generation of the Minicab model under its own brand, and a trial series was built for two years before the official market debut.

The LZ110 went into production in the same range of body variants as its Japanese counterpart. They included a passenger van, a delivery van, as well as a 2-door pickup truck or a built-in chassis.

In 1987, the LZ110 underwent extensive restyling, which mainly brought changes to the styling of the front part of the body. The vehicle had lower headlights, as well as a characteristic red logo with a stylized letter W, which has remained the company's logo to this day. The modernization was also a period of increasing popularity of the vehicle in China.
