= Munro Vehicles =

British electric vehicle manufacturer

- Industry: Automotive
- Founded: 2019; 7 years ago
- Founder: Ross Anderson; Russ Peterson
- Headquarters: Glasgow, Scotland
- Products: Electric vehicles; Off-road vehicles
- Website: munro-ev.com

All Terrain All Electric Ltd., trading as Munro Vehicles, is an automobile manufacturer based in Glasgow, Scotland. Founded in 2019, it specializes in electric off-road vehicles.

== History ==
In September 2021, the Glasgow-based company All Terrain All Electric Ltd presented the first information about development work with an early prototype known as the Munro “Mark 1” Prototype. This vehicle was based on the Ibex F8, a monocoque utility vehicle kit. The Mark 1 Prototype was used to validate the company’s electric drivetrain concept and off-road capability.

Over the next year, intensive work was carried out on the Munro Mark 1 prototype, testing, among others, a 700Nm electric motor and 80.1 kWh battery to allow for a driving range of approximately 270 km (170 mi), and also distinguished by its adaptation to driving in difficult terrain. The development of the Mark 1 resulted in the creation of the Munro MK_1 prototype, which was officially unveiled in December 2022. The MK_1 introduced Munro’s proprietary chassis design and electric four-wheel-drive system, serving as the company’s launch prototype. The aggressively styled vehicle was distinguished by its angular body, utilitarian interior and matte textured paint.

By 2023, Munro had launched the production-ready Series-M, which is available in both full-body and pickup configurations. The vehicle features a slimmer front end for better visibility, and an improved interior with adjustable steering column and greater seat adjustment. Charging speed was increased to 130kW, and battery chemistry was switched from NCM to an 85kWh LFP pack.. A suite of safety features including ABS, ESC, traction control and driver Airbag were also confirmed. The first Munro Series-M customer vehicle left the company's East Kilbride facility in November 2023, marking the first time a production car had been produced in Scotland since the closure of the Linwood Talbot factory in 1981.

=== Notable vehicle deliveries ===
In May 2025, Gleneagles Hotel took delivery of a Munro Series-M electric vehicle for guests to experience as part of their off-road driving experience. The vehicle is one of fifteen pre-production models, and delivery followed two years of testing and development supported by the hotel on their challenging off-road course.

In August 2025, Denbighshire County Council reported that they had deployed a Munro Series-M M280 for use by Clwydian Range and Dee Valley National Landscapes rangers on the hills at Loggerheads County Park to improve air quality and reduce fleet maintenance costs.

=== Bollinger Motors lawsuit ===
In February 2023, the company entered into a legal conflict with the American company Bollinger Motors, whose representatives accused the Scottish company of copying the unrealized design of the Bollinger B1/B2 electric off-road models. The case centred around a former contractor, Ross Compton, who was accused of retaining Bollinger's intellectual property and disclosing it to Munro when he joined as their Lead Designer. As of November 2023, the case was stayed in the courts and a Stipulation of Voluntary Dismissal was filed indicating that the parties had resolved the dispute.

== Products ==
- Munro MK_1 (Prototype, 2022)
- Munro Series-M (2023-on)

== See also ==
- Bollinger Motors
- Ibex (vehicle)
- Ineos Grenadier
- Land Rover Defender
