= Bollinger (disambiguation) =

Bollinger is an independent Champagne house from the Champagne region of France.

Bollinger may also refer to

== Places ==
- Bolinger, Alabama, an unincorporated community in Choctaw County, Alabama
- Bollinger County, Missouri, a county of the US State of Missouri
- Bollinger Mill State Historic Site, a Missouri State Park.

== Transportation ==
- Bollinger Motors, a New York startup that unveiled an all-electric sport utility truck in 2018; see LA Auto Show
- Bollinger Shipyards, builder of ships, workboats, and USCG cutters

== Legal cases ==
- Gratz v. Bollinger, a case of the United States Supreme Court regarding the University of Michigan undergraduate affirmative action admissions policy in 2003.
- Grutter v. Bollinger, a case of the Supreme Court of the United States regarding the affirmative action admissions policy of the University of Michigan Law School in 2003.

Lee Bollinger was the president of University of Michigan at the time and the defendant in both cases.

== Other uses ==
- Bollinger (surname)
- Bollinger Bands, a technical analysis tool invented by John Bollinger in the 1980s

== See also ==
- Bolinger, a surname
- Bollingen (multiple usage)
