= Bohlinger =

Bohlinger is a surname. Notable people with the surname include:

- John Bohlinger (born 1936), American businessman and politician
- John Bohlinger (born c. 1967), American musician and writer
- Rob Bohlinger (born 1975), American football player

== See also ==
- Bollinger (surname)
