= Wuling Rongguang =

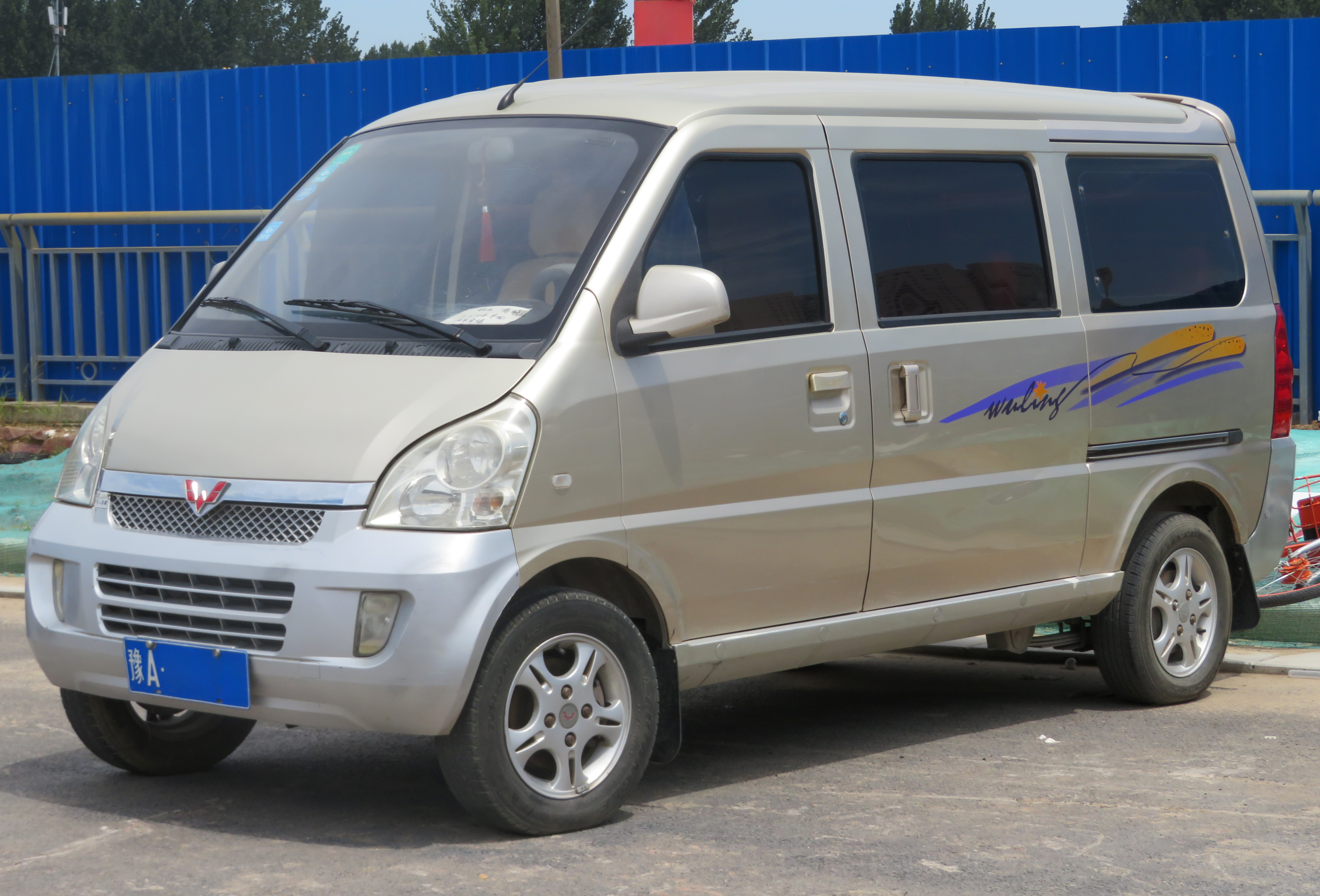

Overview
- Manufacturer: SAIC-GM-Wuling
- Production: 2008–present

Body and chassis
- Class: Microvan; Pickup truck
- Body style: 5-door minivan 2-door pickup truck 4-door pickup truck

The Wuling Rongguang (Chinese: 五菱荣光; pinyin: Wǔlíng Róngguāng) is a series of mini commercial vehicles mainly seen as the five-door, five- to eight-seater microvan produced by SAIC-GM-Wuling. A two-door and four-door pickup variant called the Wuling Rongguang Xiaoka (荣光 小卡) is sold alongside the van with a 2.0 ton to 2.5 ton cargo load capacity. An additional model that further covers the 2.5 ton to 3.5 ton light-to-medium cargo load was added in 2018 called the Wuling Rongguang Xinka (荣光 新卡).

== First generation (2008) ==
First generation
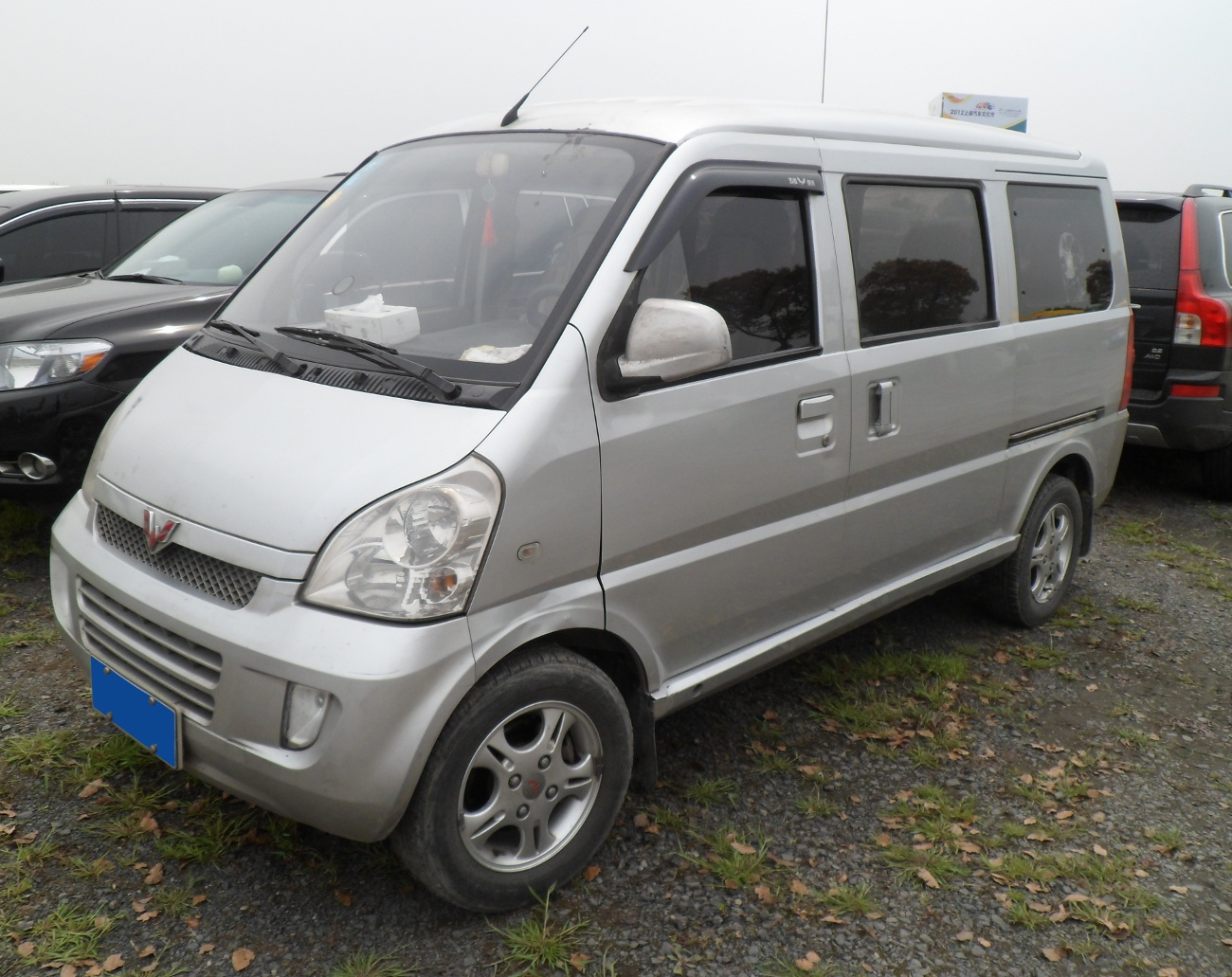

Overview
- Manufacturer: SAIC-GM-Wuling; Guangxi Automobile Group (EV50)
- Model code: N300L (van); N300P/PS (pickup); N310 (Rongguang S)
- Also called: Chevrolet N300; Chevrolet Move (Egypt); Wuling EV50 (electric panel van); Linxys EV50 (electric panel van); Wuling PLN (Thailand); Maxus Deliver 1 (van); Maxus Deliver 15 (pickup); BYD V3 (electric panel van, 2021–2022); BAW Xiaohema (electric panel van); Bollinger Urban Delivery (United States)
- Production: 2008–present

Body and chassis
- Class: Microvan; Pickup truck
- Body style: 5-door, 5- to 8-seater minivan 2- to 5-seater pickup truck

Powertrain
- Engine: 1.2 L LAQ I4; 1.5 L L3C I4
- Transmission: 5 speed manual

Dimensions
- Wheelbase: 2,700 mm (106.3 in)
- Length: 4,490 mm (176.8 in) (2017–present); 4,135 mm (162.8 in) (2014–2016); 4,105 mm (161.6 in)–4,490 mm (176.8 in) (2012–2013); 3,995 mm (157.3 in)–4,105 mm (161.6 in) (2011); 4,415 mm (173.8 in) (Rongguang V)
- Width: 1,615 mm (63.6 in) (2012–2013, 2017–present); 1,660 mm (65.4 in) (2014–2016); 1,620 mm (63.8 in) (2011); 1,685 mm (66.3 in) (Rongguang V)
- Height: 1,900 mm (74.8 in) (2011–2013, 2017–present); 1,870 mm (73.6 in) (2014–2016); 1,850 mm (72.8 in) (Rongguang V)

The Wuling Rongguang was originally introduced during the 2008 Beijing Auto Show.

The Wuling Rongguang has engine options including a 1.2 liter inline-four engine producing 61 kW (82 hp) or a 1.5 liter inline-four engine producing 80 kW (107 hp). Both engine options are mated to a 5-speed manual gearbox.

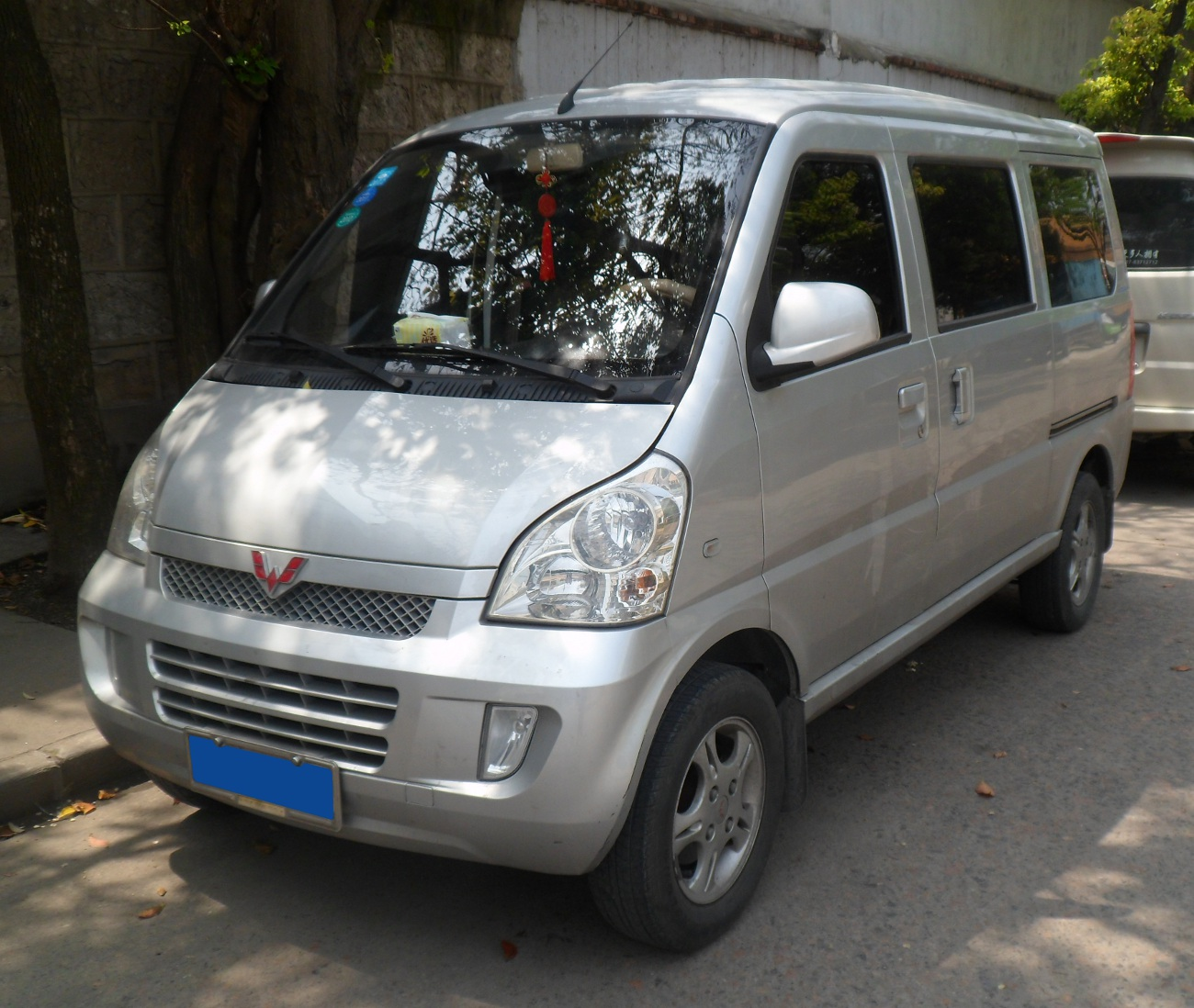
Wuling Rongguang (pre-facelift)

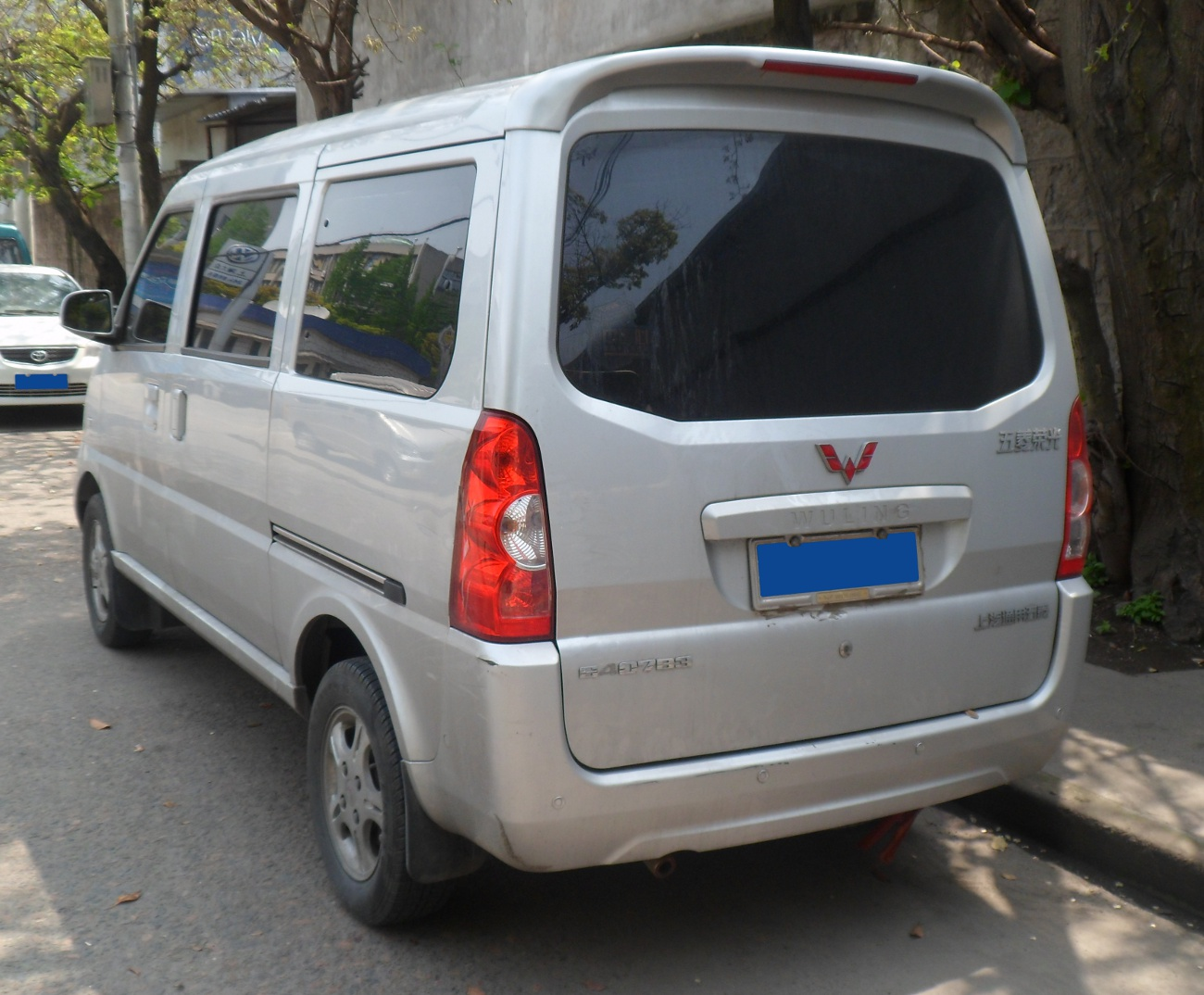
Rear view

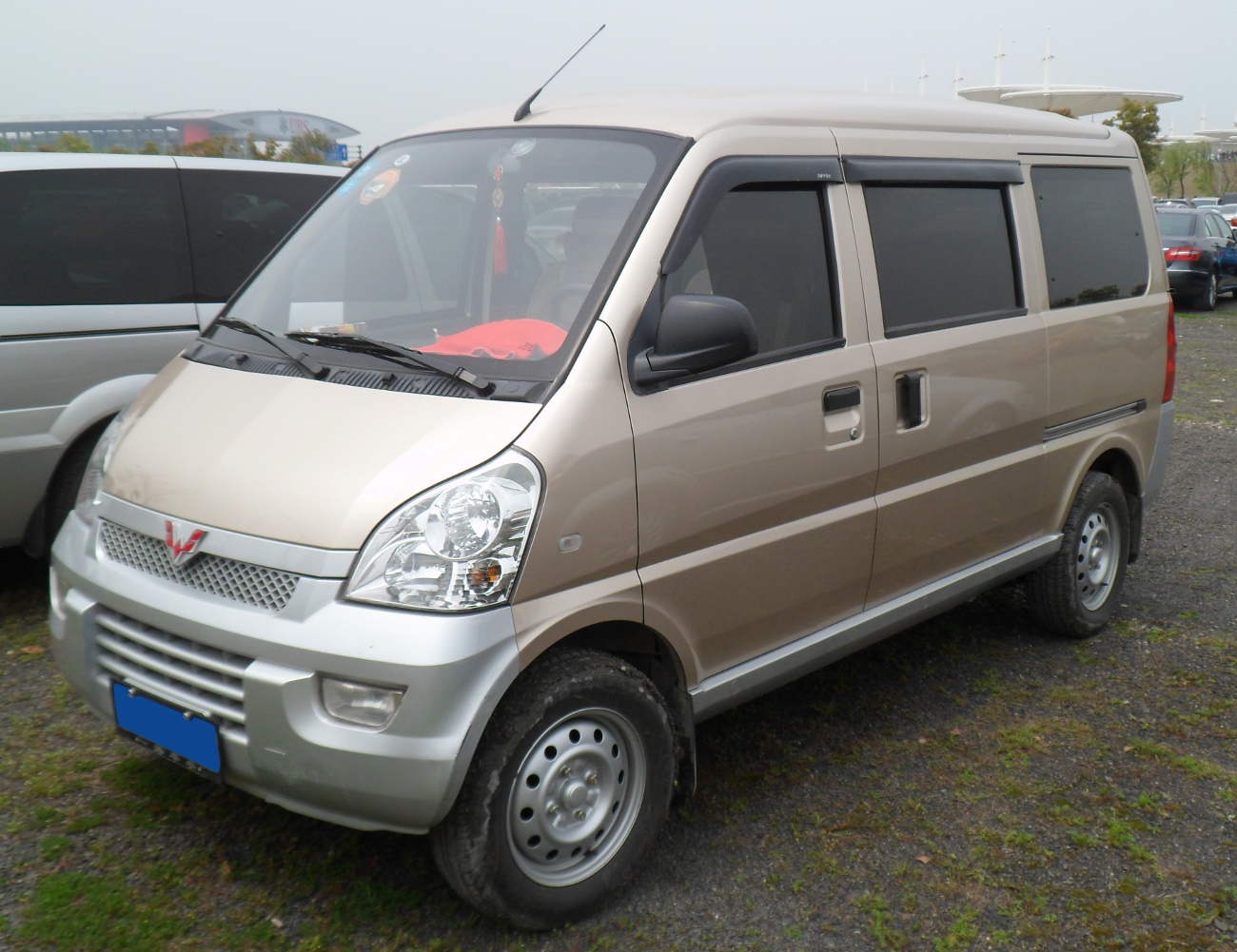
Wuling Rongguang (facelift)

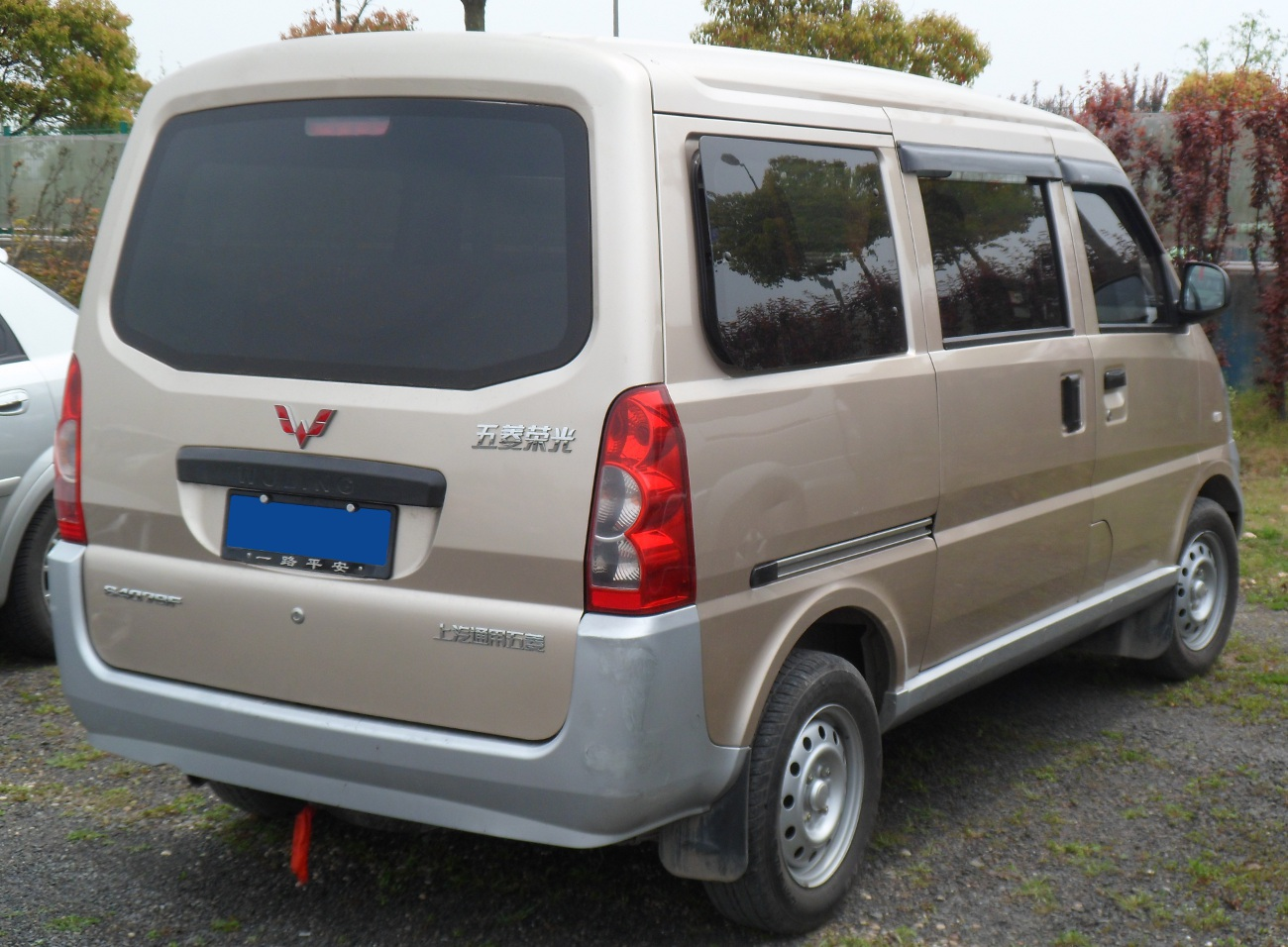
Rear view

=== Wuling Rongguang Extended Version ===
The Wuling Rongguang Extended Version is a extended version of the regular Rongguang, with wheelbase extended to 3050mm and 4490mm. With dimensions: 4490mm/1615mm/1900mm.

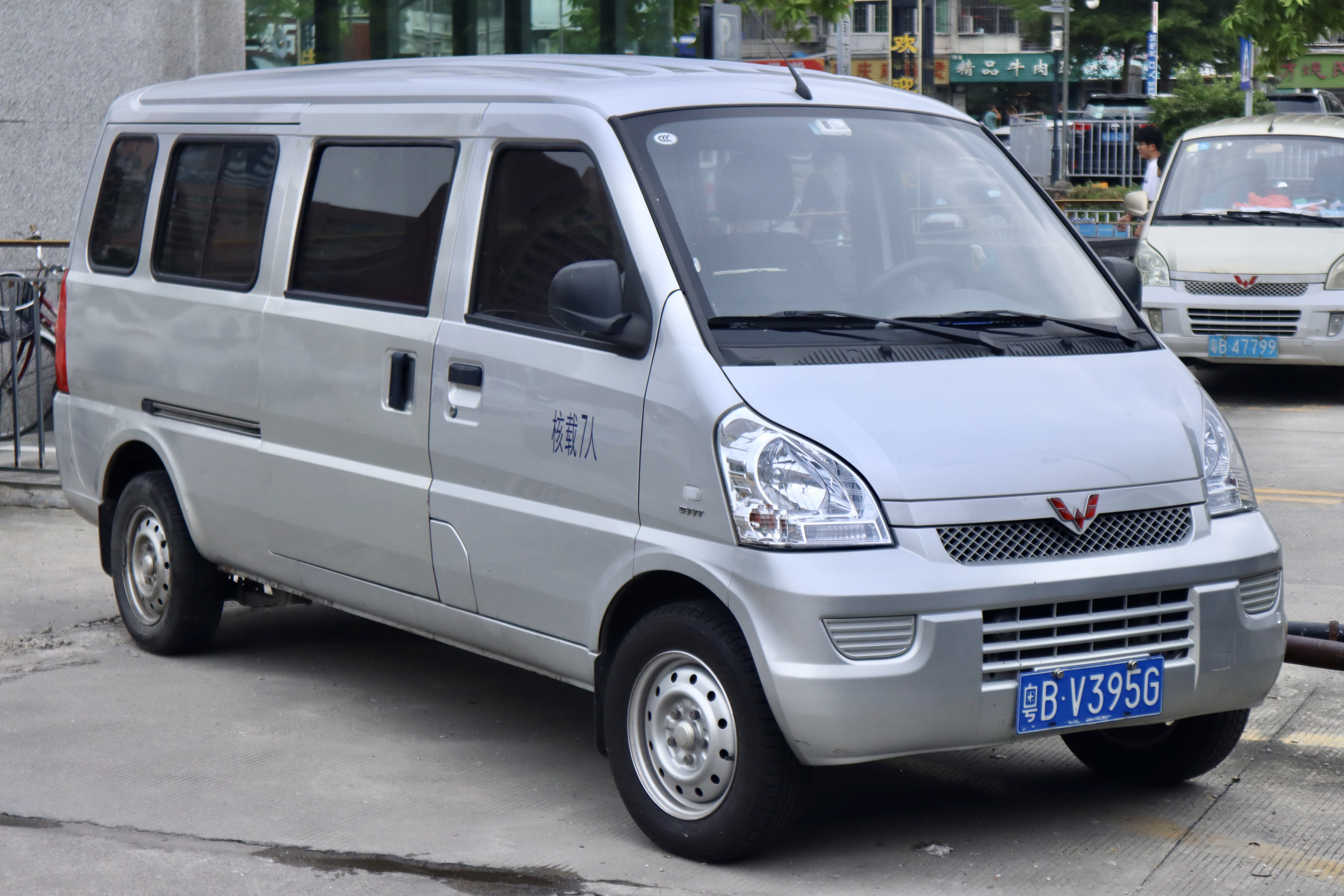
Wuling Rongguang Extended Version

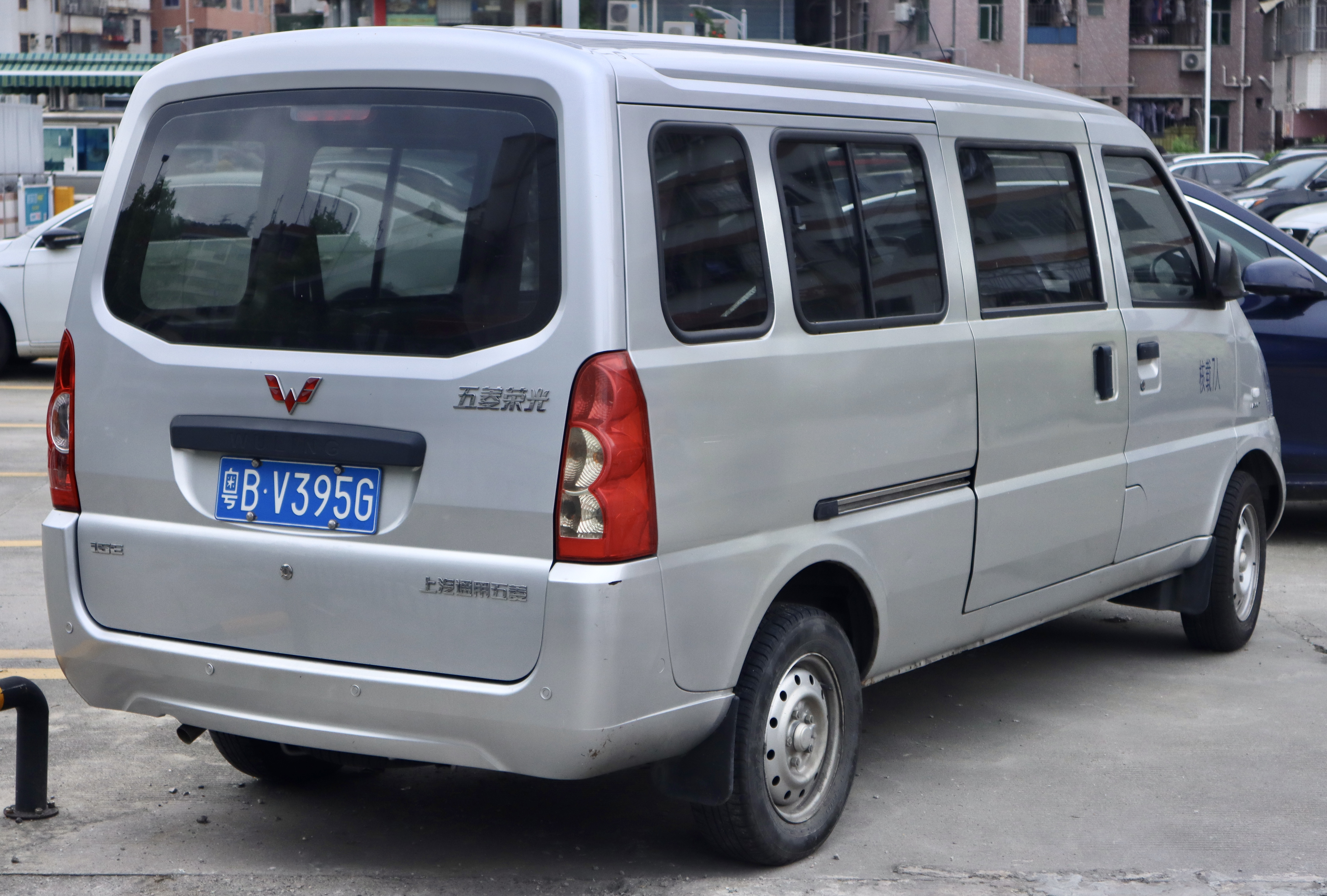
Rear view

=== Wuling Rongguang single and crew cab ===
The Wuling Rongguang single and crew cab are pickup versions of the regular Wuling Rongguang. SAIC-GM-Wuling launched the updated facelift version of the Wuling Rongguang pickup in July 2018. The Wuling Rongguang pickup is powered by a choice of 1.5 liter or 1.8 liter engines, with prices ranging between 45,800 yuan and 52,800 yuan.

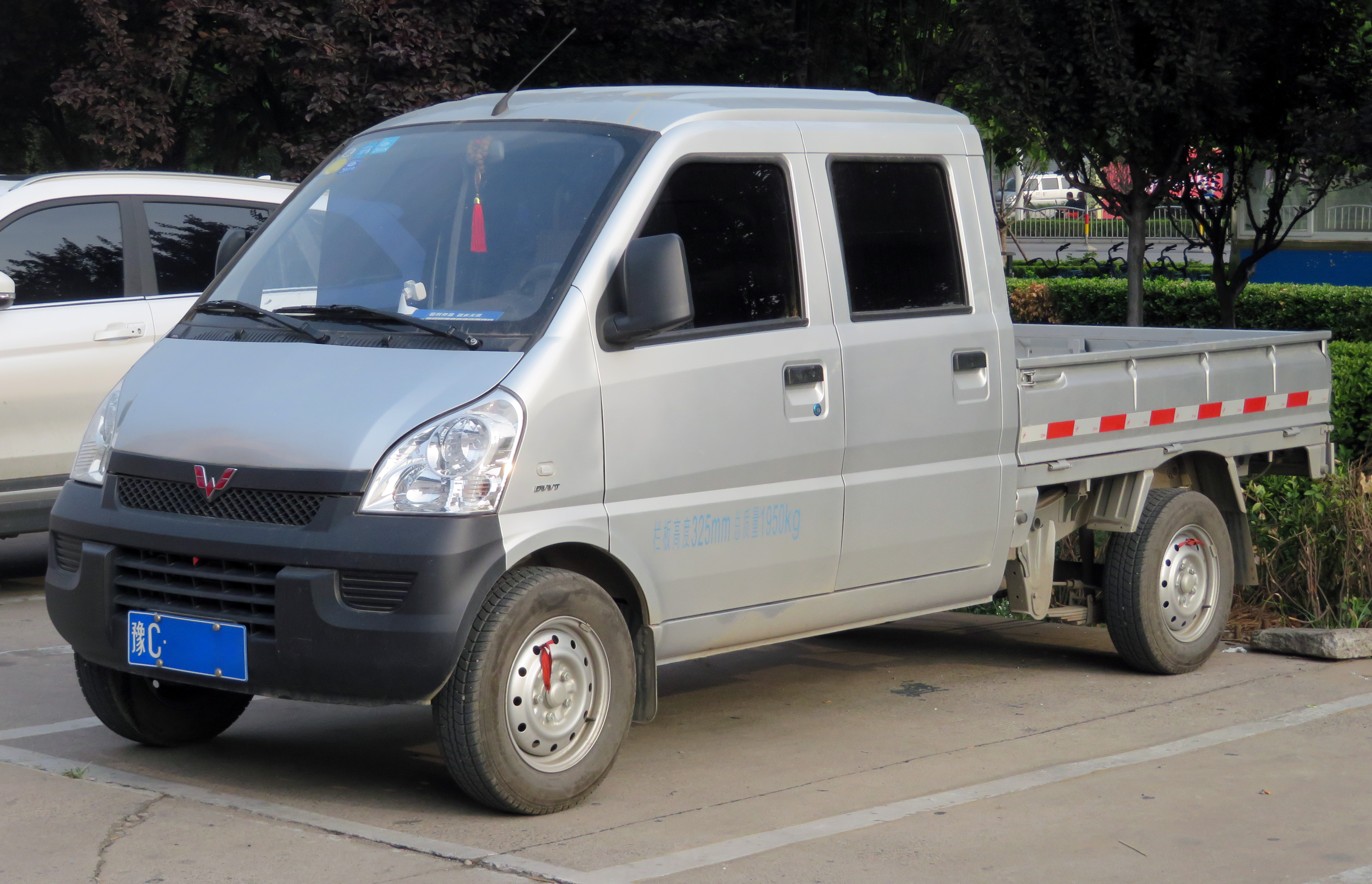
Wuling Rongguang Xiaoka (crew cab)

Wuling Rongguang Xiaoka (regular cab)

=== Wuling Rongguang S ===
The Wuling Rongguang S is a more upmarket version of the regular Wuling Rongguang, and later replaced the regular Wuling Rongguang in its market place. It features a fully redesigned body. With dimensions: 4135mm/1660mm/1870mm.

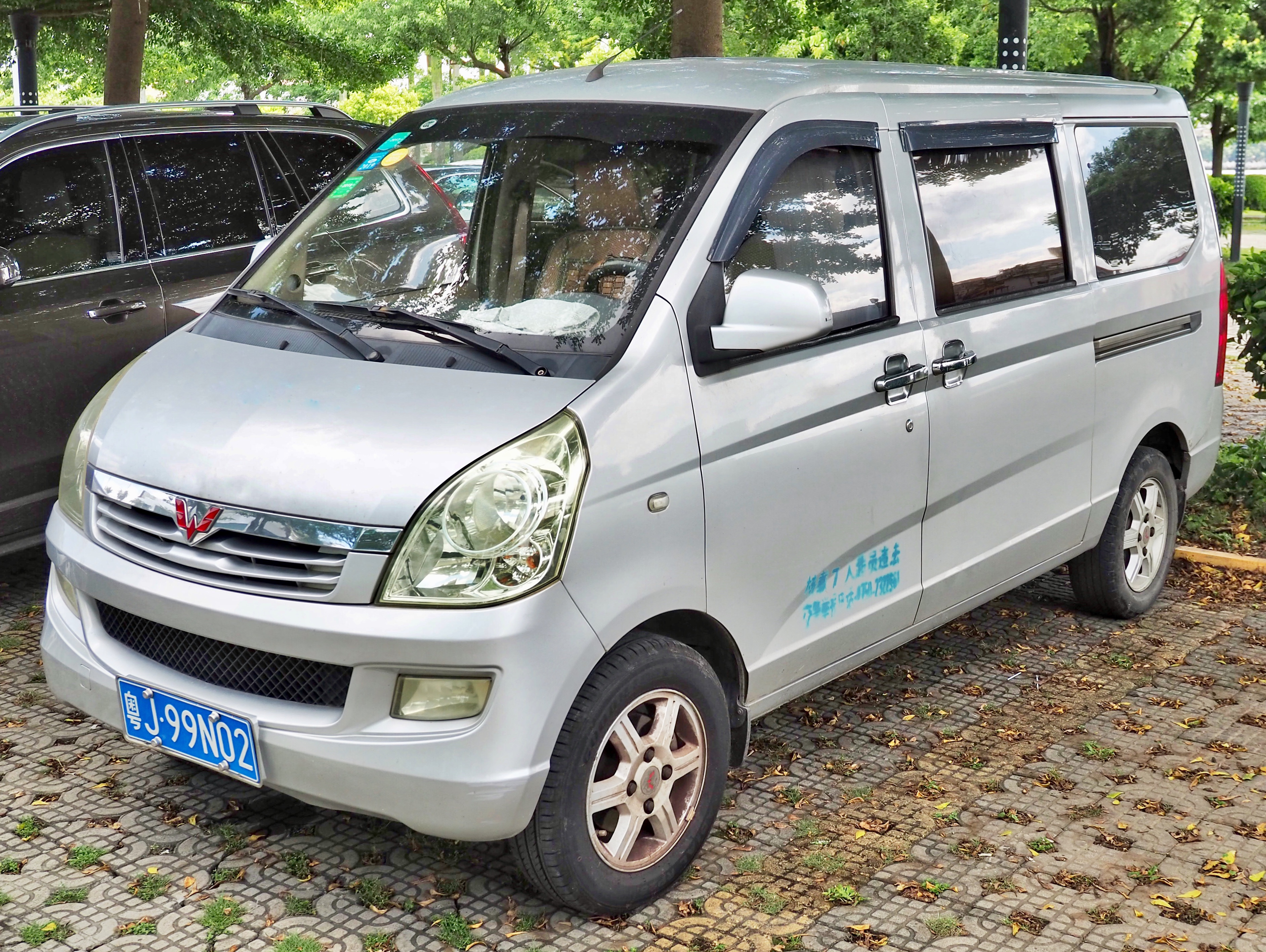
Wuling Rongguang S

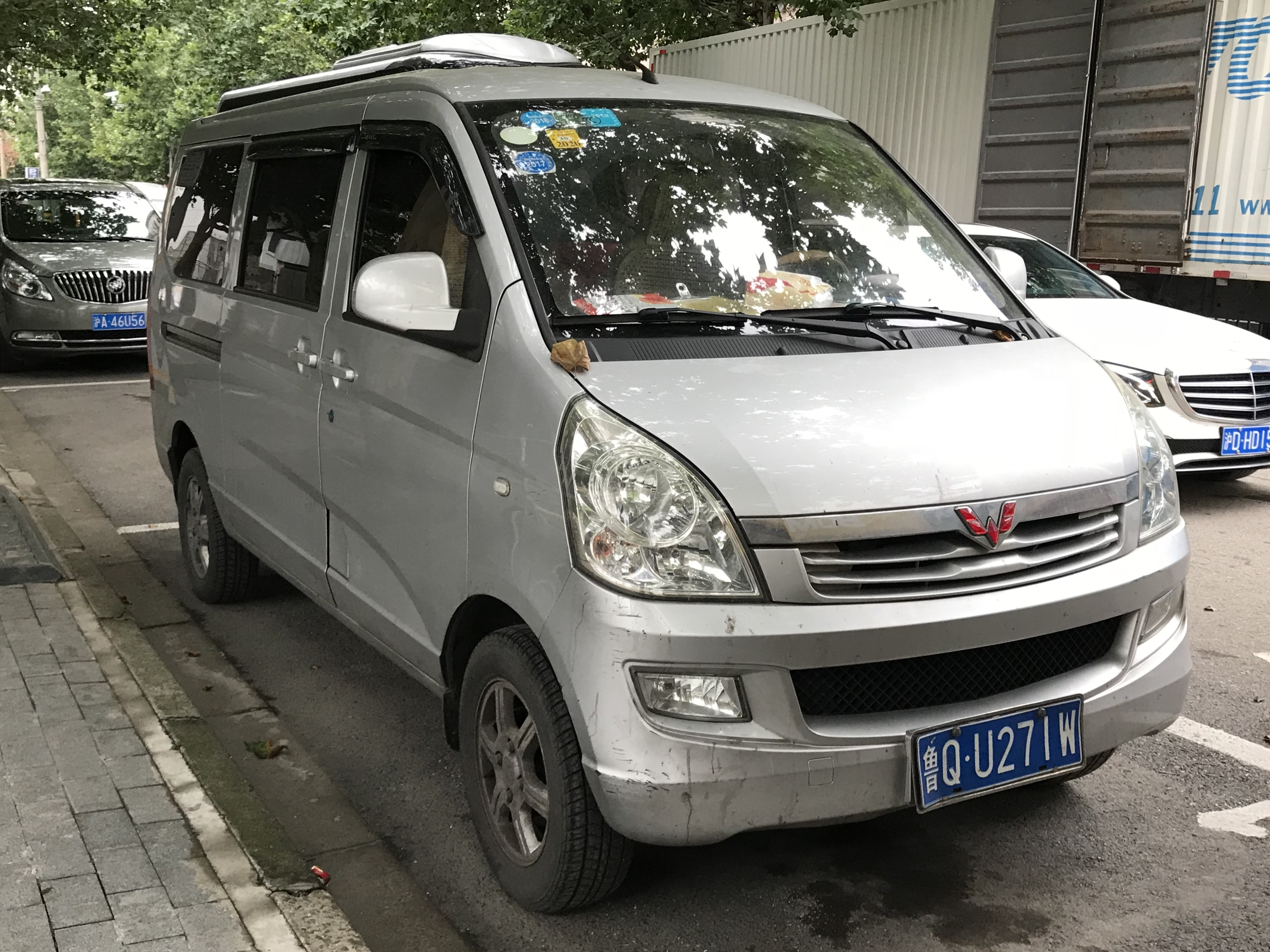
Wuling Rongguang S (extended cab)

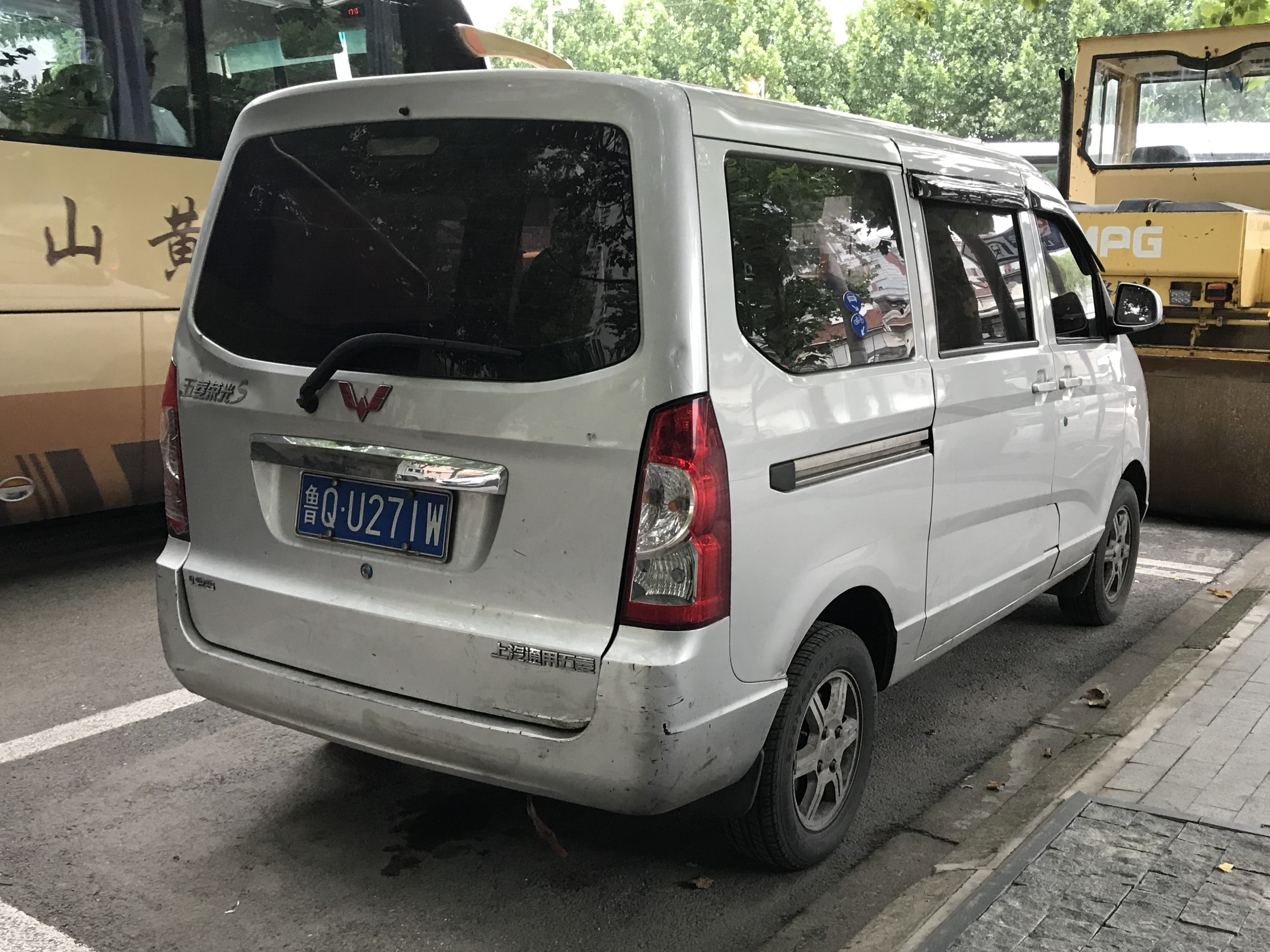
Rear view

=== Chevrolet N300/Move ===
The Chevrolet N300 is a rebadged version of the Wuling Rongguang, available in emerging markets such as Ecuador and others around the world, excluding Africa. The rebadged Wuling Rongguang Pickup Truck resulted from GM's joint venture with China's Wuling Motors, which operates under the SAIC-GM-Wuling partnership. The Chevrolet N300 is positioned above the Chevrolet N200, which is a rebadged Wuling Hongtu in several other markets. According to GM International Operations Vice President, Sales, Marketing and Aftersales Mark Barnes, “The Chevrolet N300s are robust vehicles well suited for challenging off-road driving and the weather conditions faced by users in emerging markets.”

The Chevrolet Move is a rebadged Wuling Rongguang assembled in 6 October City, Egypt, by GM Egypt from kits supplied by SAIC-GM-Wuling (SGMW) in China. Egyptian assembly of the Chevrolet Move started in the third quarter of 2012. The Chevrolet Move is the first Chinese vehicle to be assembled by GM Egypt. It is also the first SGMW model to be assembled outside the home market of China. However, the Chevrolet Move will be the second SGMW vehicle to be sold by GM in Egypt. The first was the Chevrolet N200 passenger van which was sold in Egypt and other African countries beginning in 2009. The Chevrolet N200 is no longer sold in Egypt as of 2022.

The Chinese-made N300 in its most basic Latin American market configuration with no airbags, no ABS and no ESC received 0 stars for adult occupants and 1 star for toddlers from Latin NCAP 2.0 in 2017.

==== Safety ====
===== Latin NCAP =====
The Chinese-made N300 in its most basic Latin American market configuration with no airbags, no ABS and no ESC received 0 stars for adult occupants and 1 star for toddlers from Latin NCAP 2.0 in 2017.

Latin NCAP 2.0 test results Chevrolet N300 (passengers) - NO Airbags (2017, based on Euro NCAP 2008)
| Test | Points | Stars |
|---|---|---|
| Adult occupant: | 11.92/34.0 | 0 /5 stars |
| Child occupant: | 13.28/49.00 | 1 /5 stars |

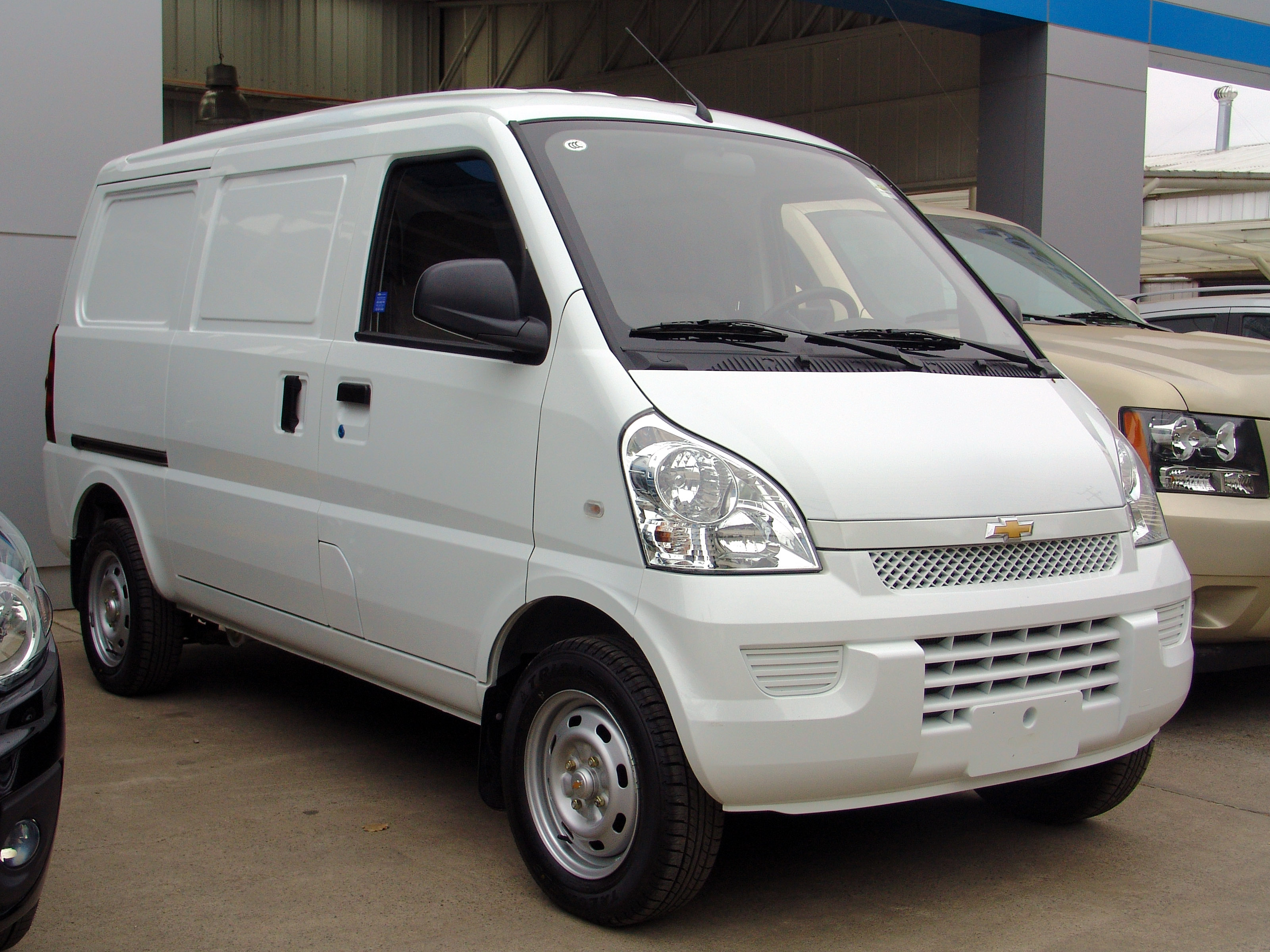
Chevrolet N300

=== Wuling EV50, Linxys EV50 and Wuling Dianka ===
The Wuling EV50/Dianka (G100/G100P) and Linxys EV50, is the commercial variants produced by Guangxi Automobile Group instead of SAIC-GM-Wuling.

The Wuling EV50 (G100) is the electric panel van variant of the Wuling Rongguang Extended Version created for the logistics industry. The Wuling EV50 is available with a 60 kW (80 hp) motor and two battery options. The higher trim is available with a 43,2 kWh battery that weighs 332 kg and has an energy density of 130,12 Wh/kg that is capable of a 300 km (186 miles) range. The lower trim is available with a 41,86 kWh battery that weighs 308 kg and has an energy density of 135,91 Wh/kg that is capable of a 245 km (152 miles) range. Wuling claims that the LFP battery packs will last for at least 2 million kilometers and the starting price for the Wuling EV50 is 108,000 yuan (13,596 euros).

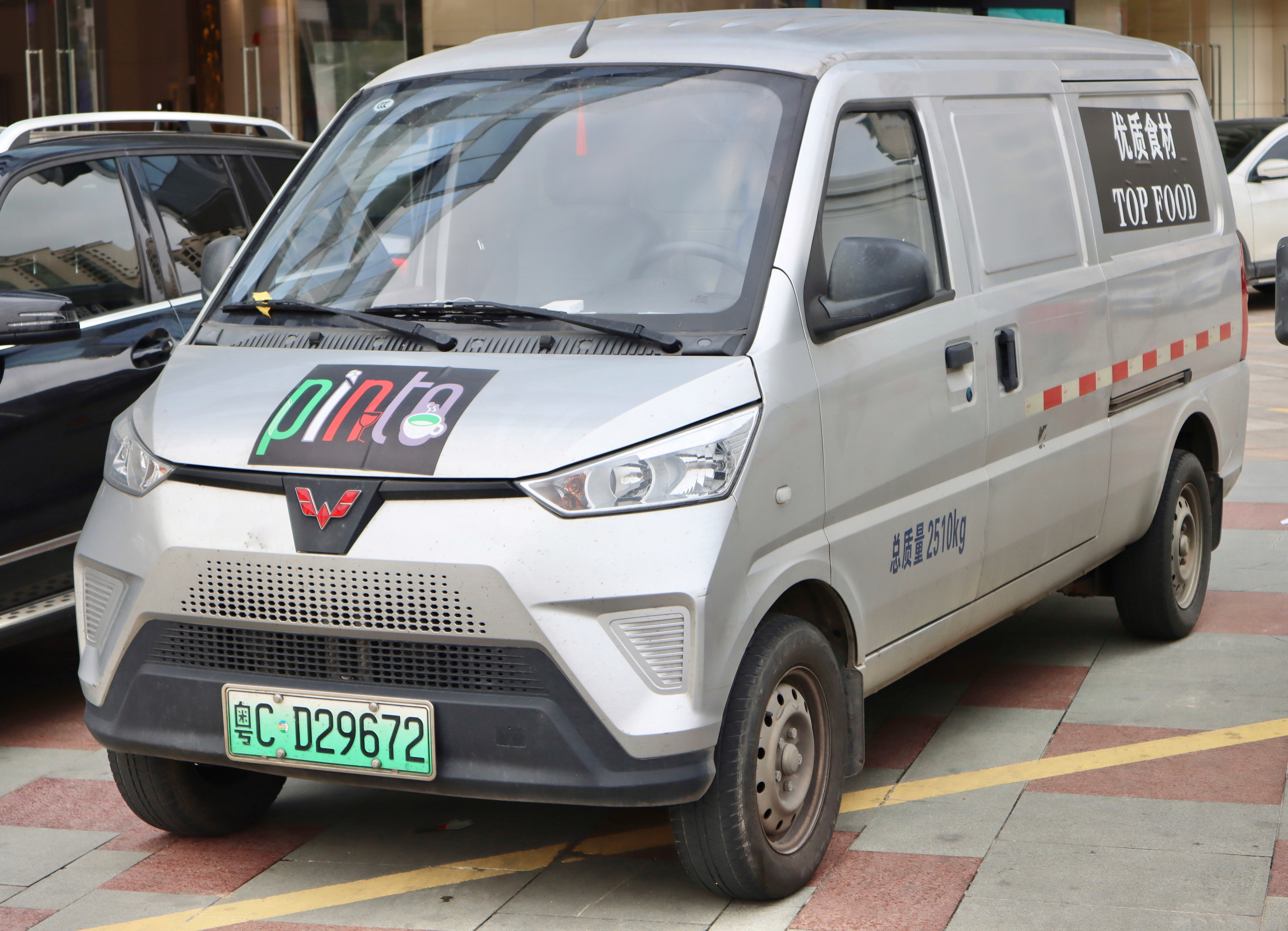
Wuling EV50

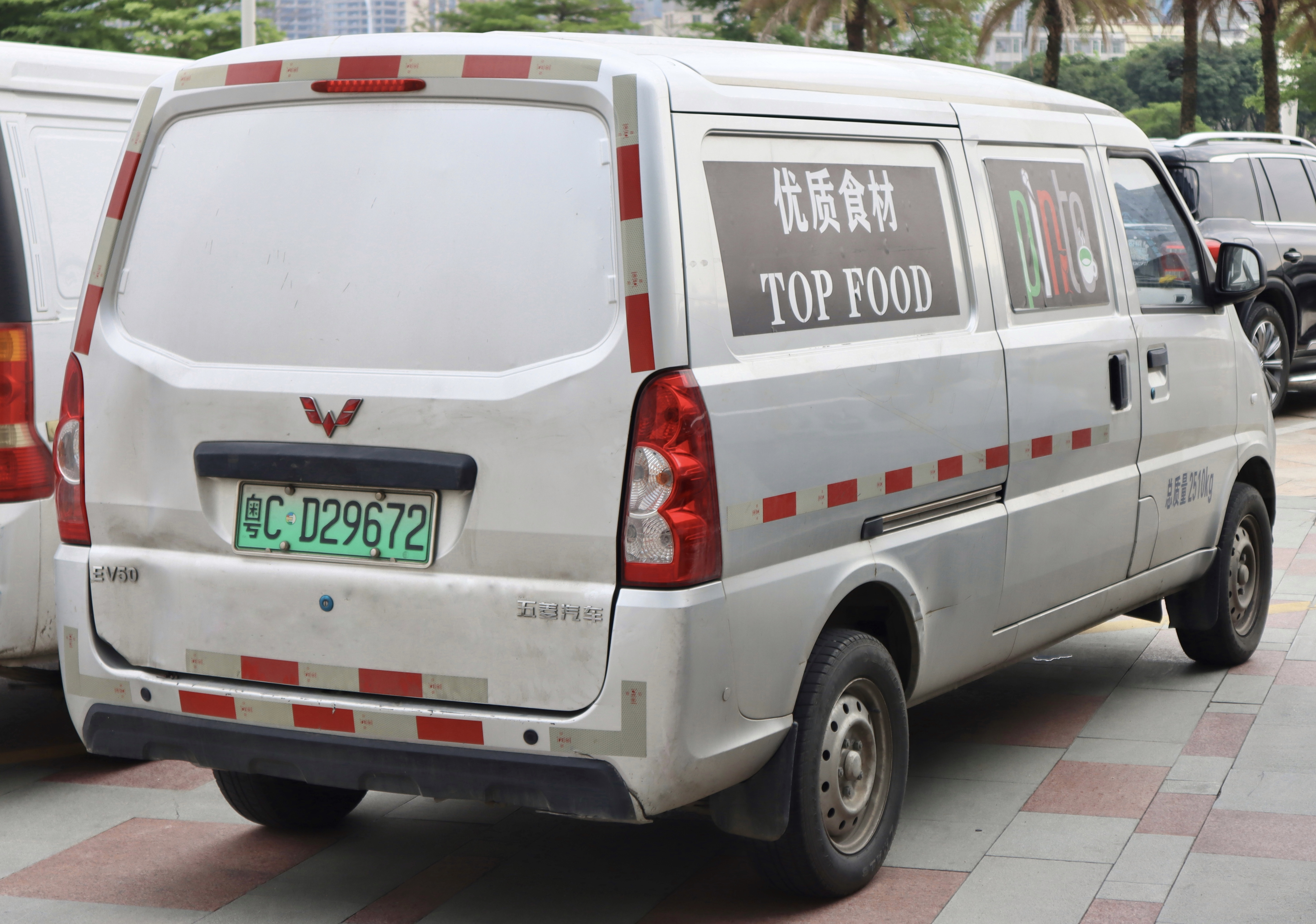
Rear view

The EV50 is also available as a pickup or chassis cab version called the Wuling Dianka (G100P), meaning electric truck. The Dianka is equipped with the same powertrain as the EV50 delivering 61 kW (82 hp) and 255 to 300 km of range.

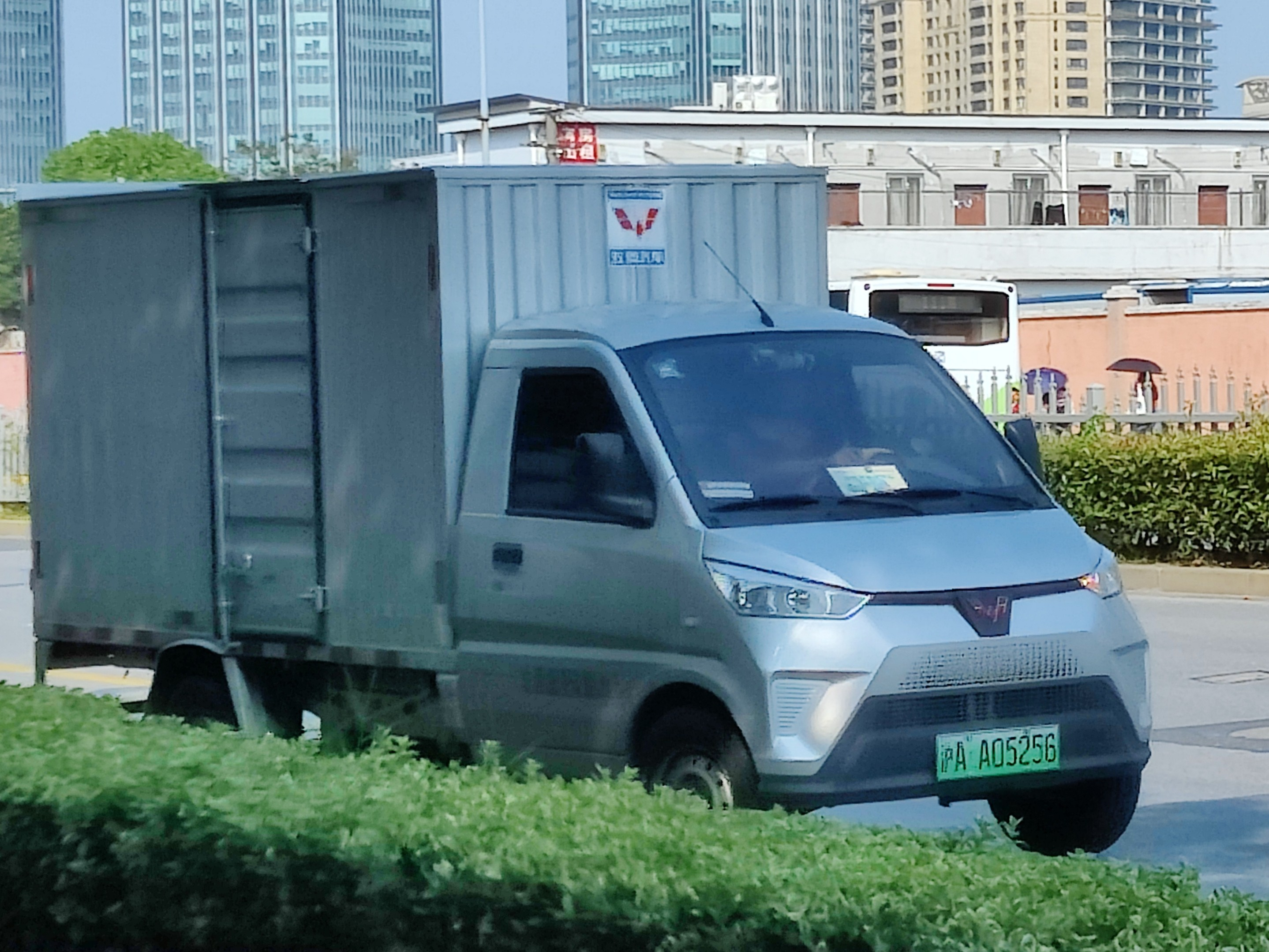
Wuling Dianka

=== BYD V3 ===
The BYD V3 is a rebadged version of the Wuling EV50 body produced by BYD. Despite the exterior body being shared by the Wuling EV50, the mechanical parts were developed inhouse by BYD and utilizes BYD's blade battery layout. The battery capacity of the BYD V3 is 47.52kWh, and supports a range of 330 km and the DC fast charging takes 1.2 hours. BYD V3 uses a permanent magnet synchronous motor with a maximum power of 75 kW (101 hp) and an output of 220 N⋅m (162 lb⋅ft) of torque.

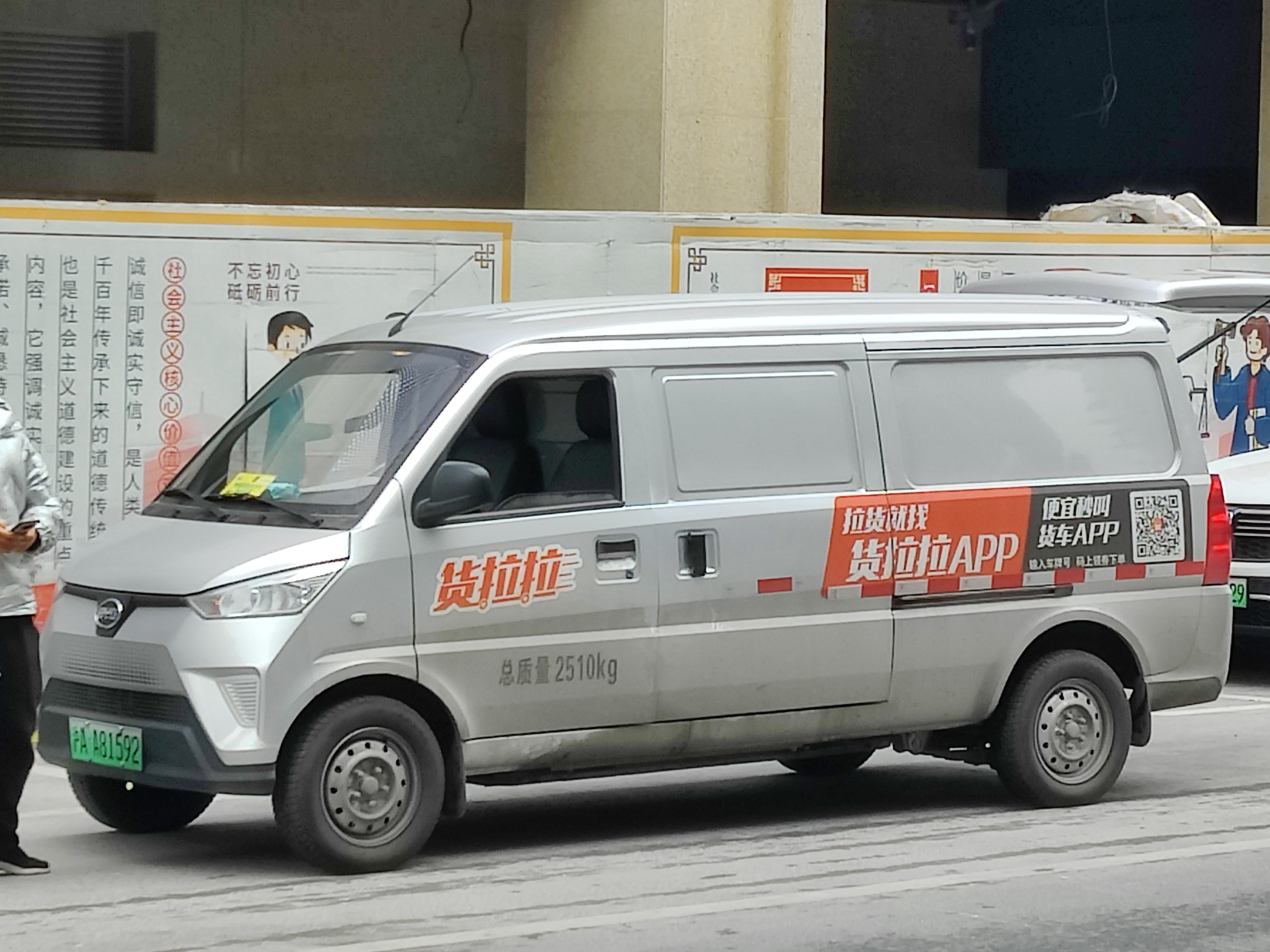
BYD V3

=== BAW Xiaohema ===
The BAW Xiaohema (北汽制造 小河马) is another rebadged version of the Wuling EV50 produced by BAW. The Xiaohema or Little Hippo is codenamed BAW5030XXY6Z541BEV and is produced in Hebei. The exterior body is shared with the Wuling EV50 and the top speed is 90 km/h.

=== Wuling Rongguang V ===
A largely different vehicle which has a body style closer to a compact MPV. The Wuling Rongguang V is actually a rebadged Wuling Hongguang V.

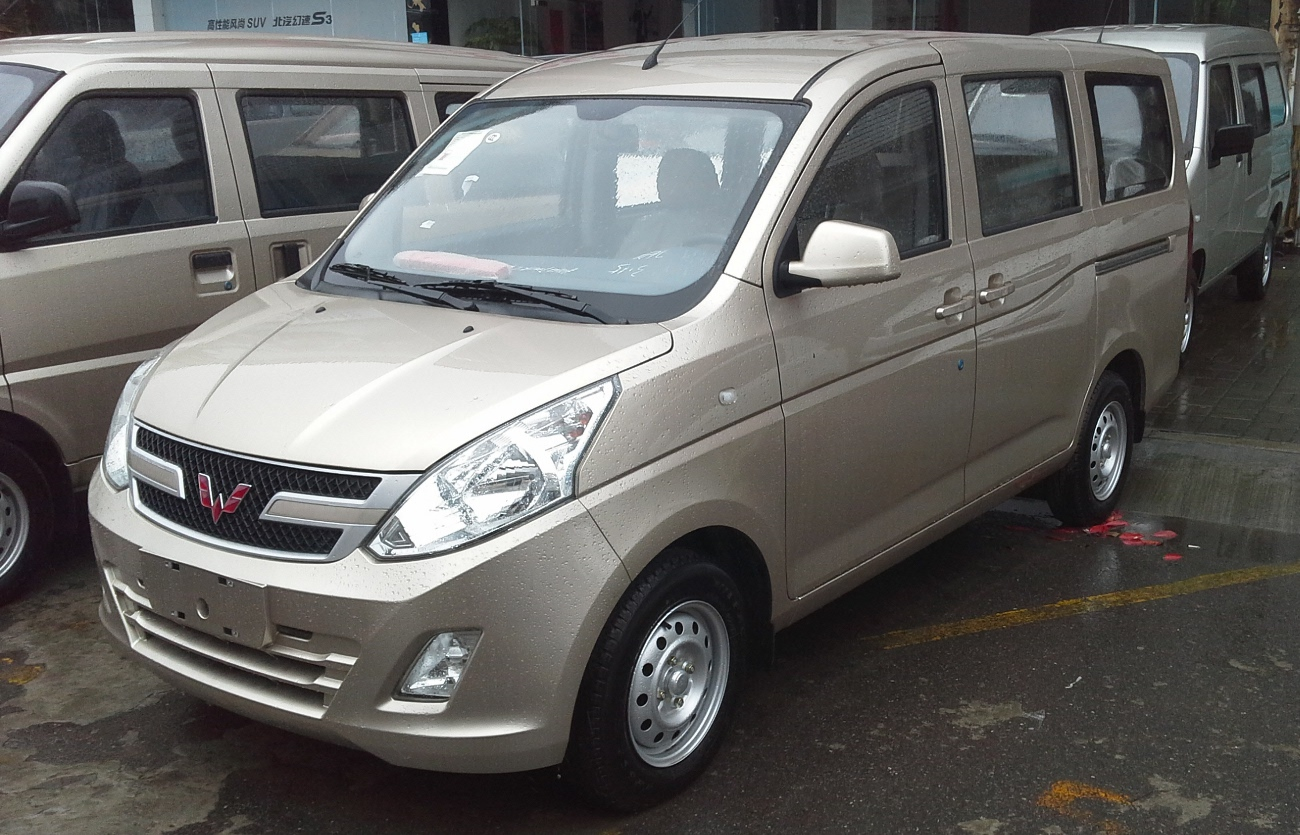
The Wuling Hongguang V which later rebadged into the Wuling Rongguang V.

== Wuling Rongguang Xinka (2018) ==
Wuling Rongguang Xinka
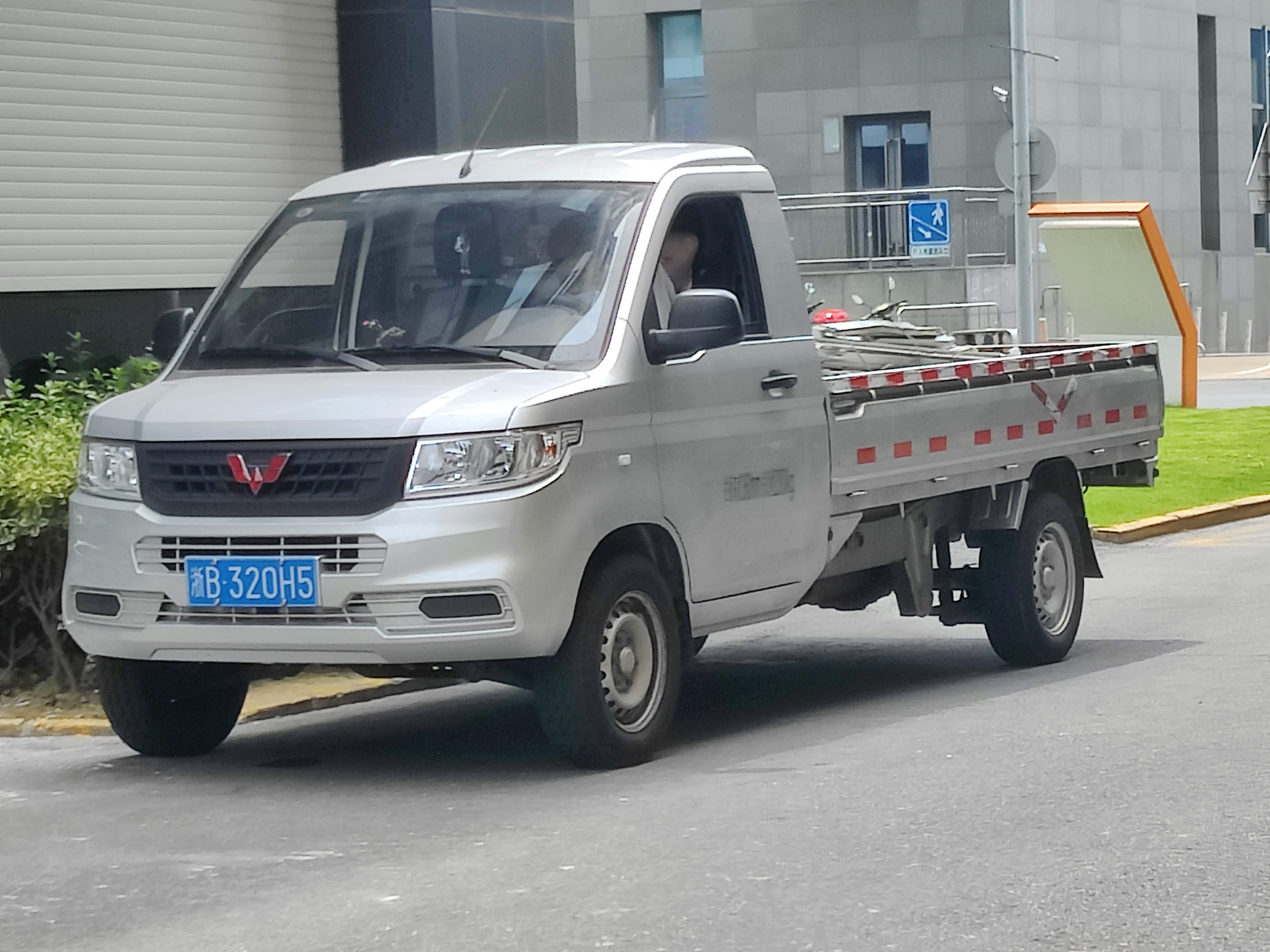

Overview
- Manufacturer: SAIC-GM-Wuling
- Model code: N350P/PS
- Production: 2018–present

Body and chassis
- Class: Pickup truck
- Body style: 2-door pickup truck; 4-door pickup truck

Powertrain
- Engine: 2.0 L inline-4+ CNG; 2.0 L "LJM20B" inline-4; 1.8 L "LJ479Q6" inline-4; 1.5 L "LAR" inline-4
- Transmission: 5-speed manual

Dimensions
- Wheelbase: 3,350 mm (131.9 in)
- Length: 5,905 mm (232.5 in) (single/crew cab extended bed dually); 5,500 mm (216.5 in) (single/crew extended bed); 5,550 mm (218.5 in) (single/crew cab extended bed); 5,490 mm (216.1 in) (single/crew cab extended bed dually); 5,220 mm (205.5 in) (single/crew cab standard)
- Width: 1,910 mm (75.2 in); 1,880 mm (74.0 in); 1,760 mm (69.3 in)
- Height: 1,900–2,010 mm (74.8–79.1 in)

The Wuling Rongguang Xinka (荣光 新卡) is a slightly larger pickup truck series that covers the 2.5 ton to 3.5 ton light-to-medium cargo load market demands. The Xinka name directly translates to New Truck, and the series is strictly only offered as a truck, sold alongside the regular Rongguang vans and trucks. The Wuling Rongguang Xinka is available as both a single cab and a crew cab, with standard and extended cargo bed available matched to standard or dually rear axle setups. The Rongguang Xinka series debuted in June 2018.

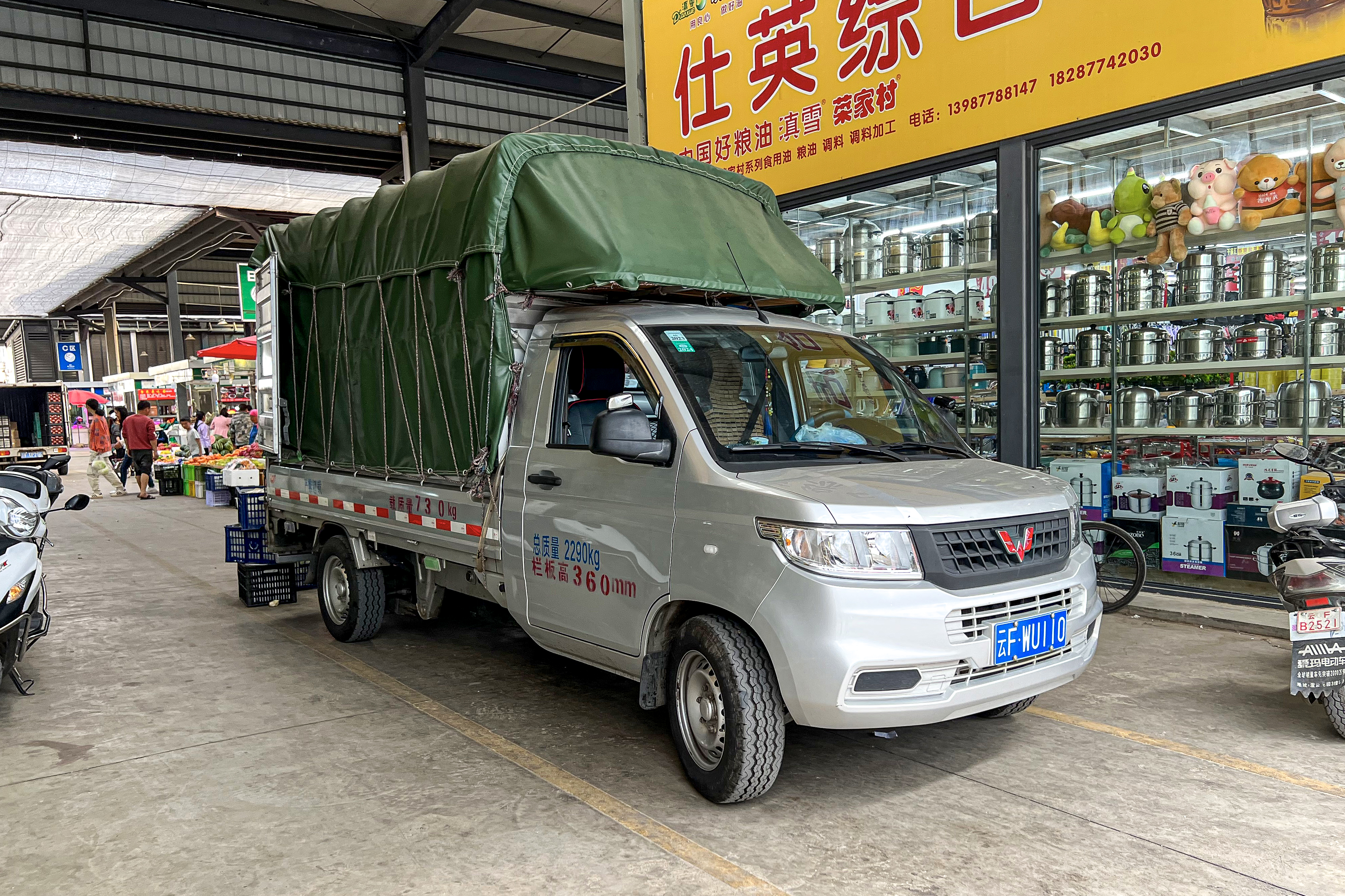
Wuling Rongguang Xinka (single cab)

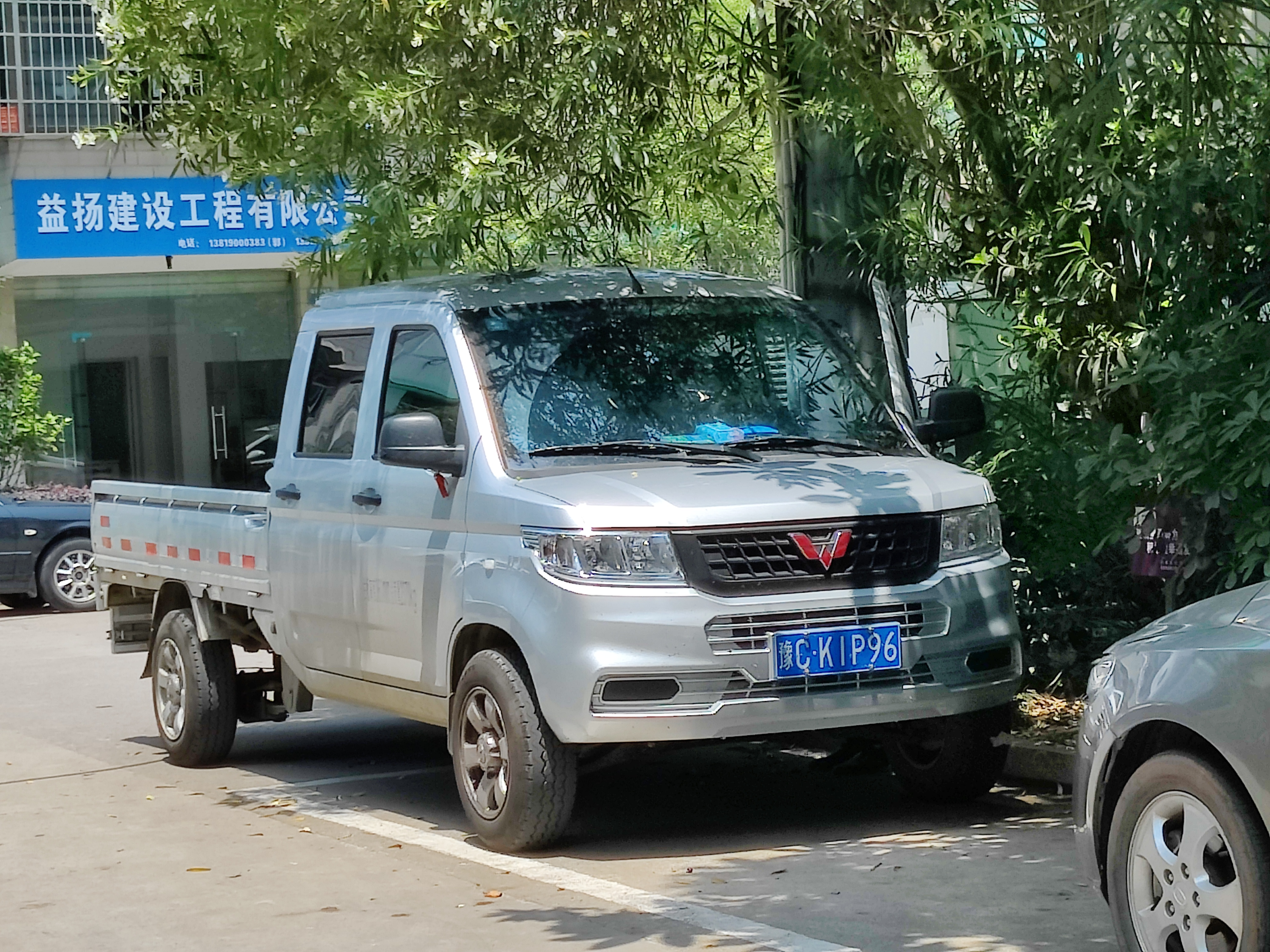
Wuling Rongguang Xinka (crew cab)

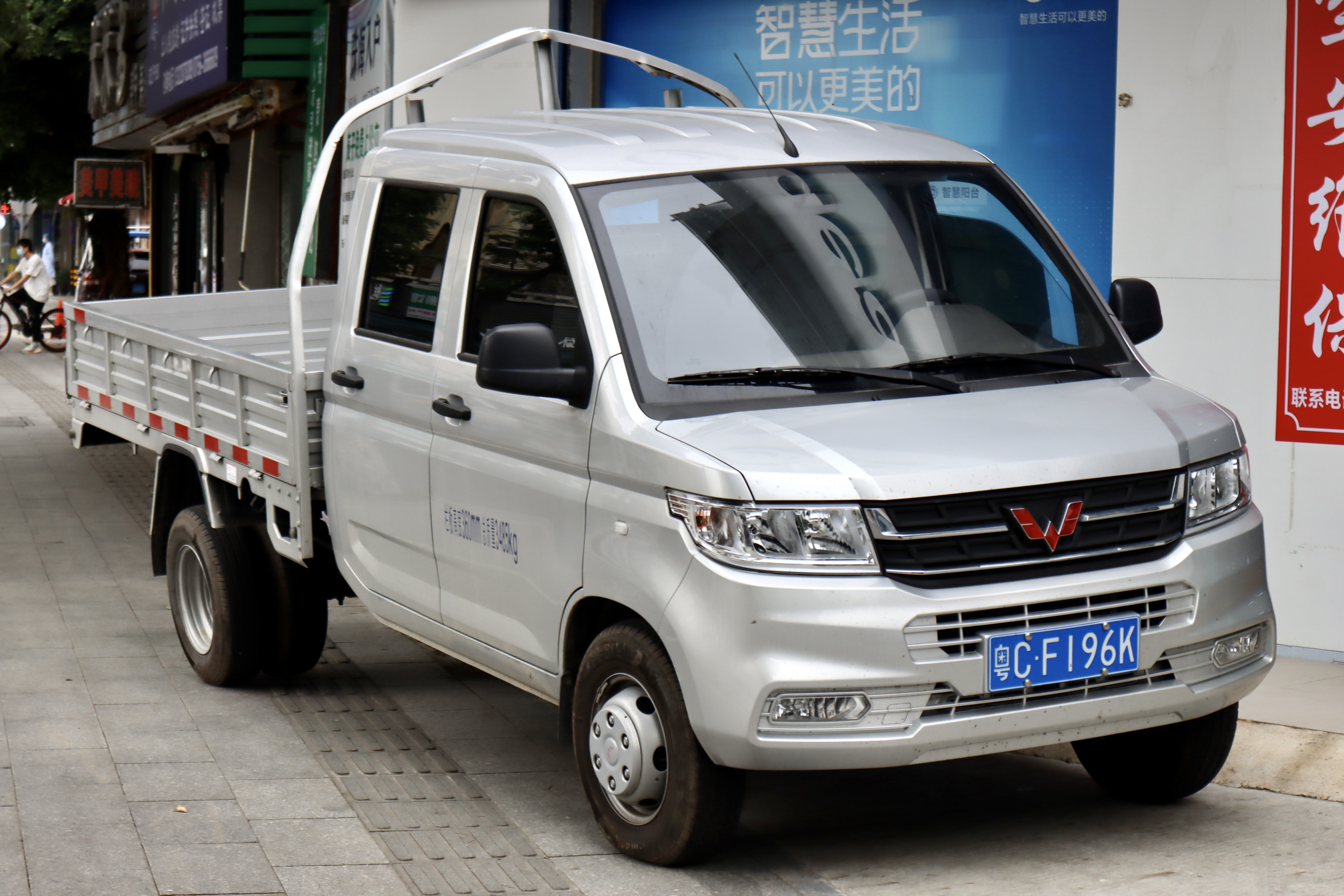
Wuling Rongguang Xinka (crew cab dually MY2022)

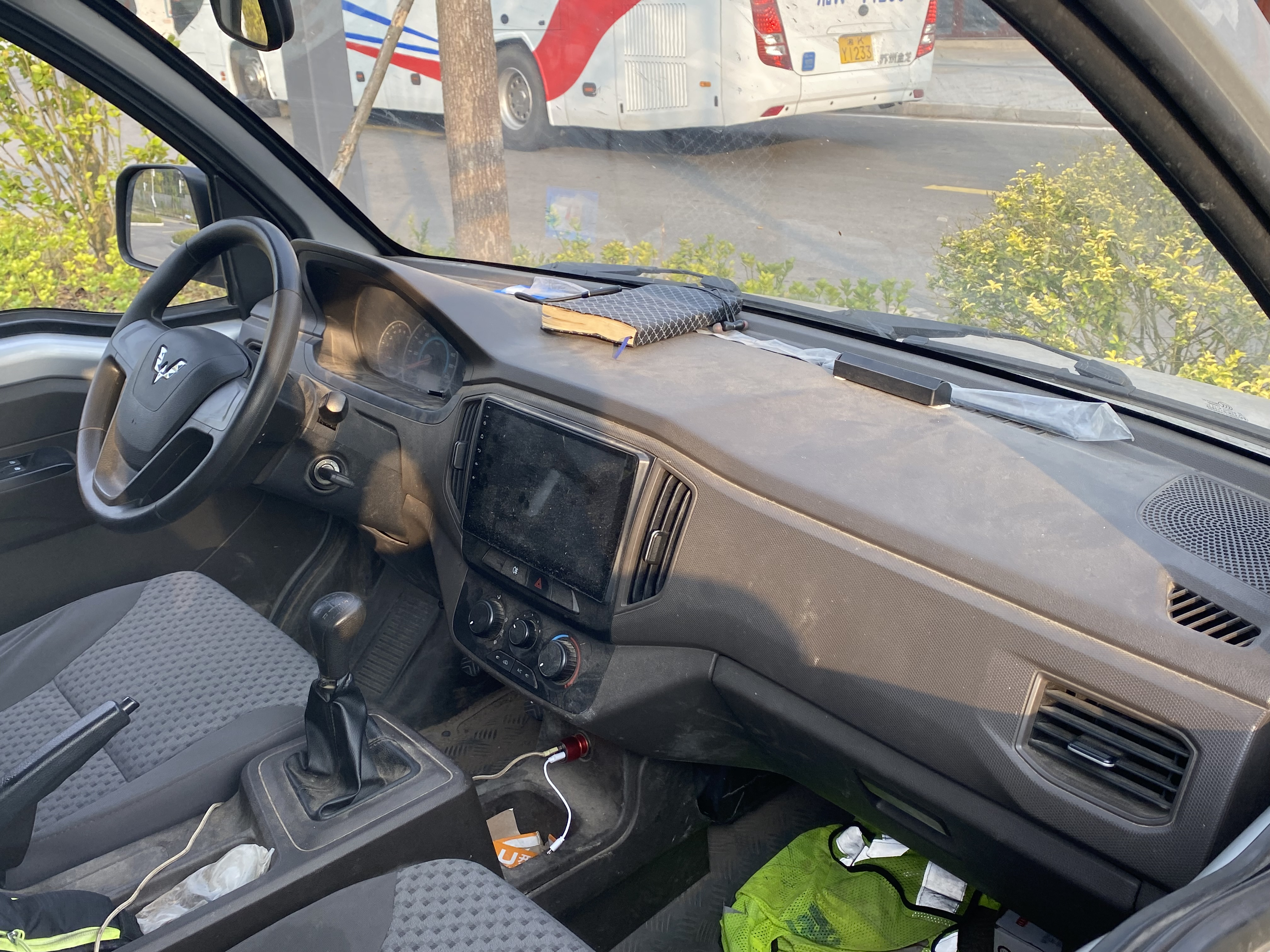
Interior

== Second generation (2026) ==
Second generation
- Wuling Rongguang II (ICE)

Overview
- Manufacturer: SAIC-GM-Wuling
- Model code: CF510V
- Production: 2026–present

Body and chassis
- Class: Microvan
- Body style: 5-door minivan

Dimensions
- Wheelbase: 2,850 mm (112.2 in)
- Length: 4,535 mm (178.5 in)
- Width: 1,735 mm (68.3 in)
- Height: 1,970 mm (77.6 in)

Production of the second generation Rongguang microvan was started in October 2025. Available as a 5- to 7- seater van, the second generation Rongguang was first launched as a fully electrified variant and is equipped with a single motor with a maximum power output of 100kW, paired with lithium iron phosphate batteries. The gasoline-powered ICE version has a restyled front bumper allowing more air intake to be added, and as of November 2026, the ICE variant has no information and date shared apart from a thumbnail on the Wuling Chinese official website preannouncing it's arrival.

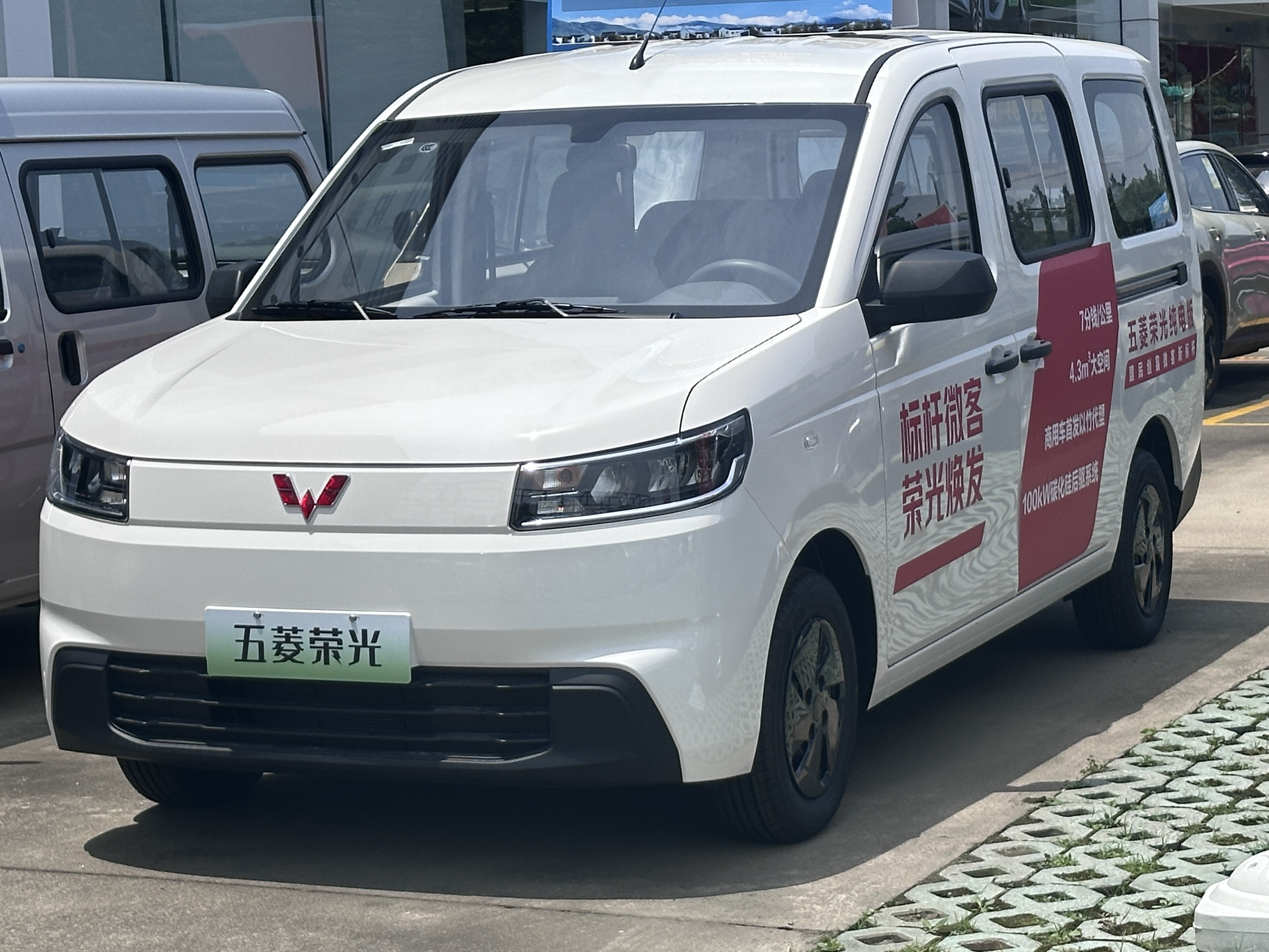
Wuling Rongguang II (EV)

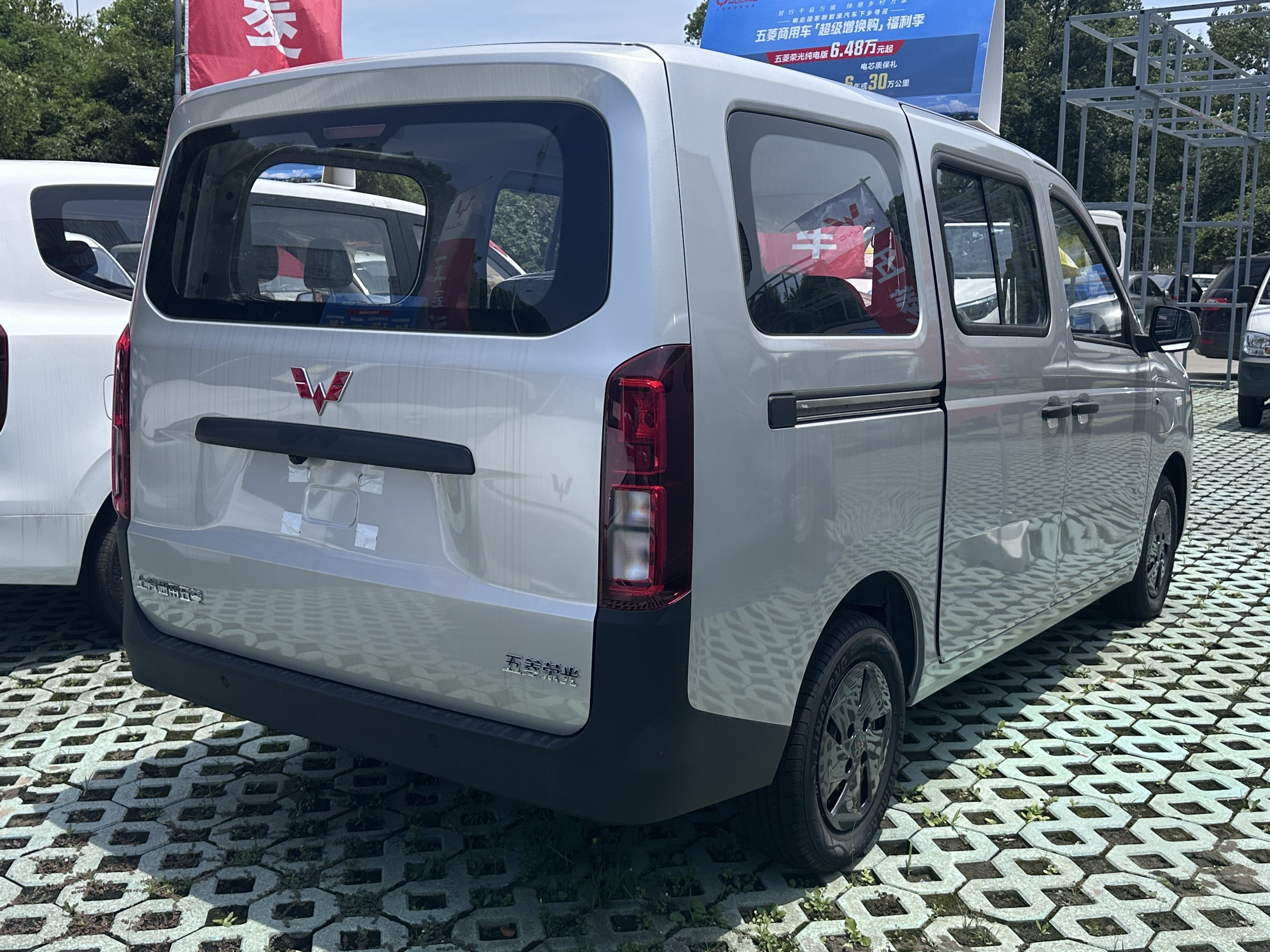
Rear view

== Wuling Rongguang Jinka (2026) ==
Wuling Rongguang Jinka

Overview
- Manufacturer: SAIC-GM-Wuling
- Production: 2026–present

Body and chassis
- Class: Pickup truck
- Body style: 2-door pickup truck; 4-door pickup truck

Powertrain
- Transmission: 5-speed manual

Dimensions
- Wheelbase: 3,350 mm (131.9 in); 3,700 mm (145.7 in) (LWB)
- Width: 1,795 mm (70.7 in)

The Wuling Rongguang Jinka (荣光 金卡) is a battery electric micro truck series that covers the 2.5 ton to 3.5 ton light-to-medium cargo load market demands. The Jinka name directly translates to Gold Truck, and the series is strictly only offered as a truck, sold alongside the regular Rongguang vans and trucks. The Rongguang Jinka is available as both a single cab and a crew cab, with standard and extended cargo bed available matched to standard light duty chassis under the name Jinka T30 or dually rear axle setup for medium duty chassis under the name Jinka T50. The Rongguang Jinka series was first seen in MIIT filings in October 2026.

Wuling Rongguang Jinka T30 (regular cab)

Wuling Rongguang Jinka T50 (crew cab)

Rear view

== Sales ==
Rongguang
| Year | China |
|---|---|
| 2024 | 11,285 |
| 2025 | 11,691 |

Rongguang S
| Year | China |
|---|---|
| 2024 | 11,413 |
| 2025 | 9,144 |
