= Bollingen (disambiguation) =

Bollingen may refer to:

- Bollingen, a village in the municipality of Rapperswil-Jona, canton of St. Gallen, Switzerland
  - Bollingen railway station near Bollingen
  - Bollinger Sandstein, sandstone from the upper Lake Zürich (Obersee) area
  - Bollingen Tower, located in Bollingen, built by psychiatrist Carl Jung
- Bollingen Foundation, an educational foundation
  - Andrew W. Mellon Foundation, which currently holds most assets of the Bollingen Foundation
- Bollingen Prize, awarded by Beinecke Library at Yale University
- Bollingen Series, a book series published by Princeton University Press

== See also ==
- Bollinger (multiple usage)
- Bolligen, a municipality in the canton of Bern, Switzerland
- Boltigen, a municipality in the canton of Bern, Switzerland
