= Bollinger B1 =

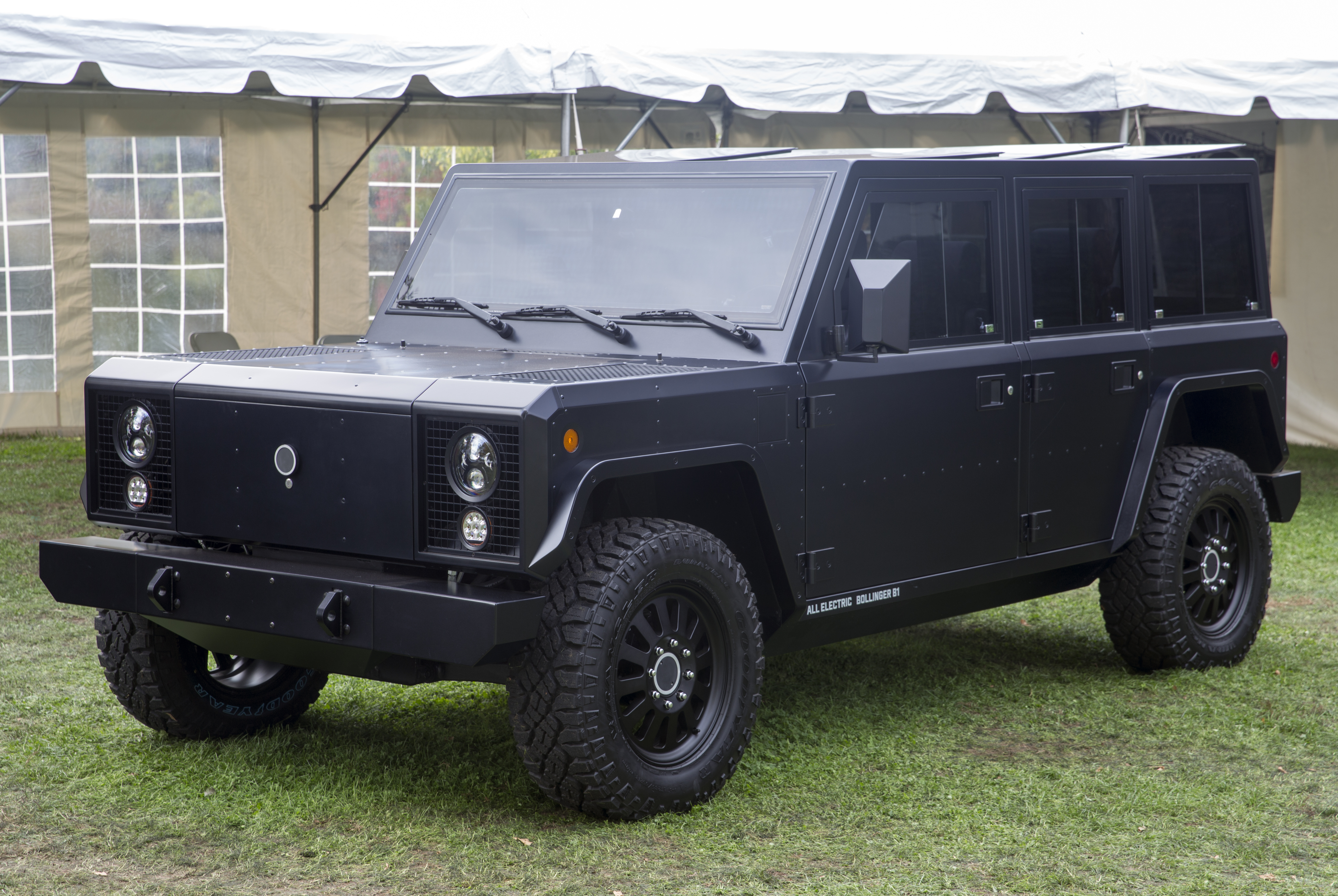

Overview
- Manufacturer: Bollinger Motors
- Also called: Bollinger B2
- Production: Postponed indefinitely

Body and chassis
- Class: Mid size
- Body style: 5-door SUV
- Layout: Dual motor, four-wheel-drive

Powertrain
- Power output: 614 hp
- Transmission: 2-speed Hi/Lo

Dimensions
- Wheelbase: 3,017 mm (118.8 in)
- Length: 4,368 mm (172.0 in)
- Curb weight: 2,268 kg (5,000.1 lb)

The Bollinger B1 is a four-wheel drive off-road SUV announced in 2017 by Bollinger Motors along with a pickup truck variant, marketed as the Bollinger B2. Bollinger announced in 2022 that the production of the vehicles has been delayed indefinitely.

== History ==
After Bollinger Motors was founded in 2014, a prototype announcing the company's first production electric off-road vehicle was unveiled in September 2017. The B1 Concept took the form of a three-door vehicle with an angular silhouette and matte paint.

The B1 was presented in September 2019, adopting cosmetic changes to the appearance of the lights, the radiator grille and, above all, the dimensions of the body compared to the study from two years ago. The vehicle became longer, gaining not a 3-door, but a 5-door body with an additional second row of seats.

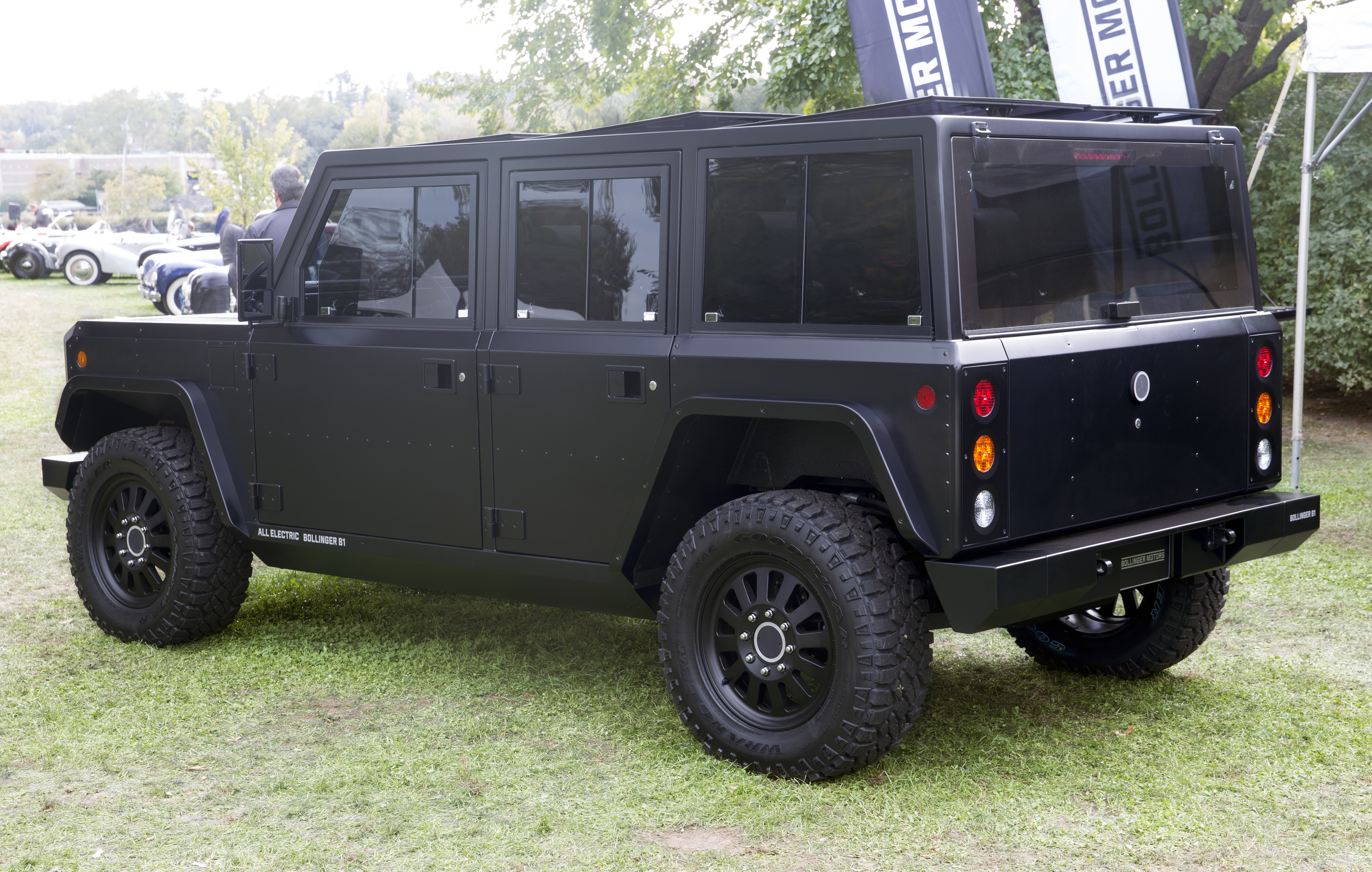
Rear view of the Bollinger B1

Another characteristic element of the B1's appearance is the raw, angular body maintained in a minimalist design, which has also been preserved in the passenger compartment. The compartment for transporting long items extending from the edge of the front to the rear of the car was made possible by placing the electrical system longitudinally under the passenger compartment and by installing widely spaced seats.

== B2 ==
Bollinger B2
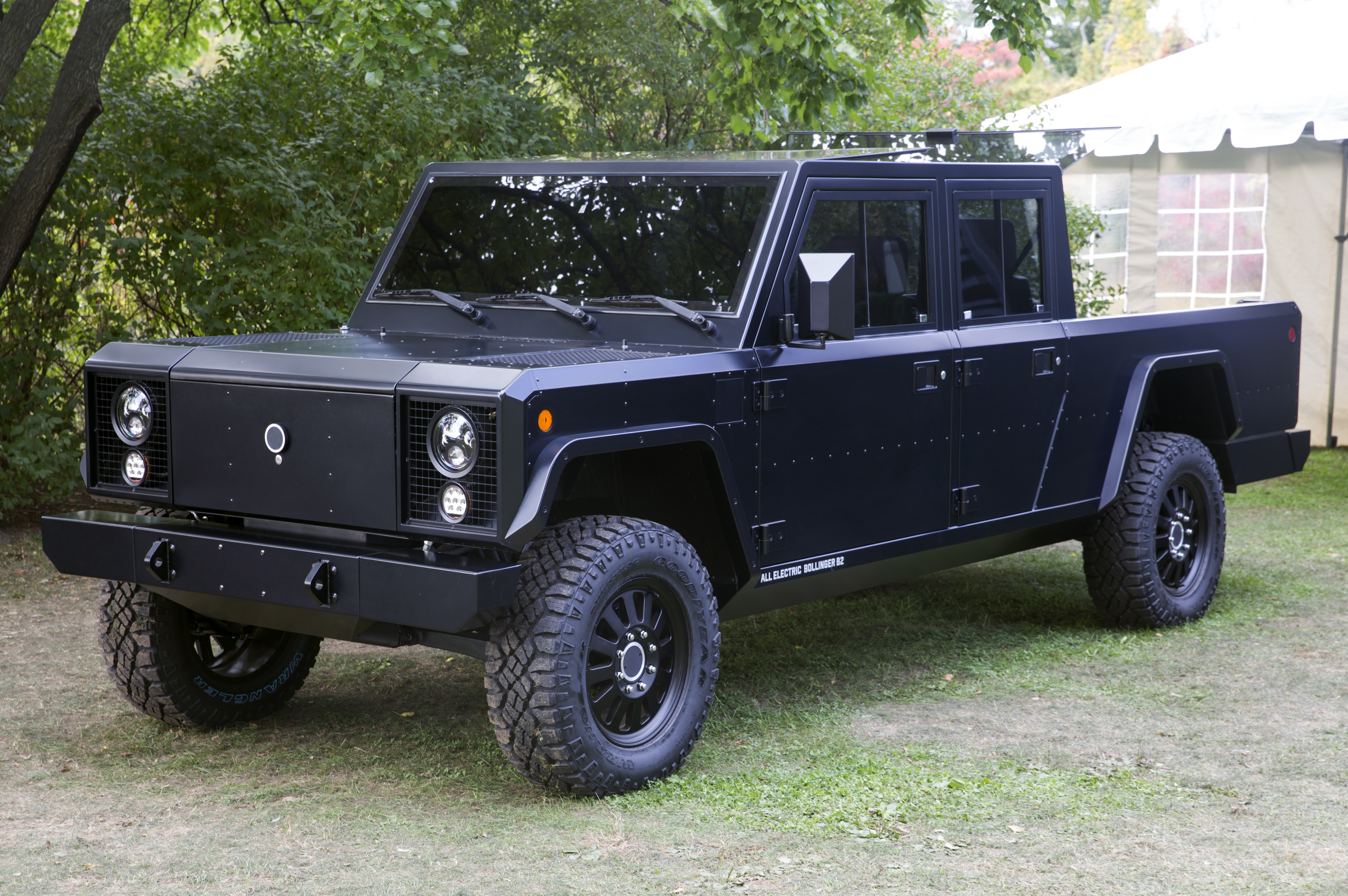

Overview
- Manufacturer: Bollinger Motors

Body and chassis
- Layout: Front-engine, four-wheel drive pickup truck.
- Doors: 4

Powertrain
- Power output: 614 HP
- Transmission: 2-speed Hi/Lo
- Hybrid drivetrain: Four-wheel drive

Simultaneously with the premiere of the serial B1, Bollinger also presented a pickup based on it, called Bollinger B2. It was distinguished by an extended wheelbase with a large transport compartment adjacent to the four-door, four-seat passenger cabin. It was discontinued before it entered production. It had an announced base price of $125,000.

== Sale ==
Production of serial Bollinger models was projected to begin at the end of 2020, while sales of B1 and B2 were originally expected to start in early 2021 with prices starting at $125,000. In January 2022, Bollinger announced that production of the B1 and B2 had been delayed indefinitely.

== Technical data ==
The initial 3-door B1 prototype of 2017 was equipped with two electric traction motors, one each for the front and rear axles, providing all-wheel drive with a combined output of 360 hp (270 kW) and 472 lb⋅ft (640 N⋅m) of torque. The total weight was 3,900 lb (1,800 kg) and two battery capacities were planned: a base 60 kW-hr version with 120 mi (190 km) of range and a 120 kW-hr version, extending range to 200 mi (320 km).

Both the B1 and the B2 are powered by two electric motors with a total power of 614 hp (458 kW), developing 905 Nm of torque. Battery capacity is 120 kWh, while the projected range is set at 200 mi (322 km).

== See also ==
- Tesla Cybertruck
