= Bollinger Motors =

American electric vehicle manufacturer

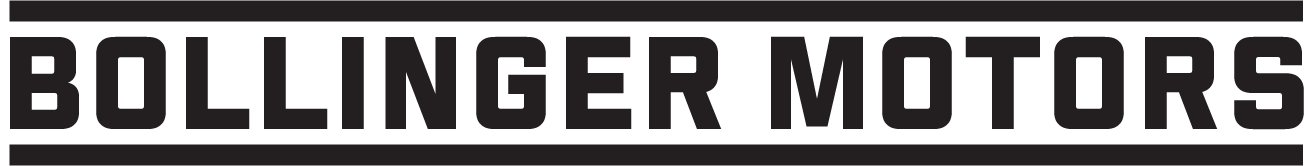
- Industry: Automotive
- Founded: 2014; 12 years ago
- Founder: Robert Bollinger
- Headquarters: Oak Park, Michigan, U.S.
- Key people: James Taylor (CEO) Brian Chambers (President and COO) Siva Kumar (Chief Strategy Officer)
- Website: Bollinger Motors

Bollinger Motors was an American automobile manufacturer of electric vehicles based in Oak Park, Michigan.

== History ==
=== Founding ===
The automotive company was founded in Hobart, New York in 2014 by its namesake, American entrepreneur Robert Bollinger. The aim was to develop a full-size electric off-road vehicle.

In April 2017, Bollinger showed an aluminum chassis with a 105 in (2,700 mm) wheelbase that weighed 295 lb (134 kg) alone, designed for a forthcoming "all-electric sport utility truck". The first result of the work of Bollinger's designers was a prototype of a three-door car called the B1, which was presented in June 2017. The car has an austere design distinguished by an angular body covered with matte varnish and the possibility of disassembling the rear part of the roof, its appearance was compared by the automotive press to vintage Ford Bronco and Land Rover Defender utility vehicles. The market launch of the model was then scheduled for 2019. By August 2017, the manufacturer managed to collect 6,000 "expressions of interest" for the Bollinger B1; these did not require a refundable deposit. Bollinger deliberately designed the 2017 B1 prototype as a medium-duty Class 3 truck with a GVWR between 10,001 and 14,000 lb (4,536 and 6,350 kg) in order to reduce the regulatory burden on the company compared to passenger cars and light-duty trucks.

Canceled Bollinger utility vehicle prototypes

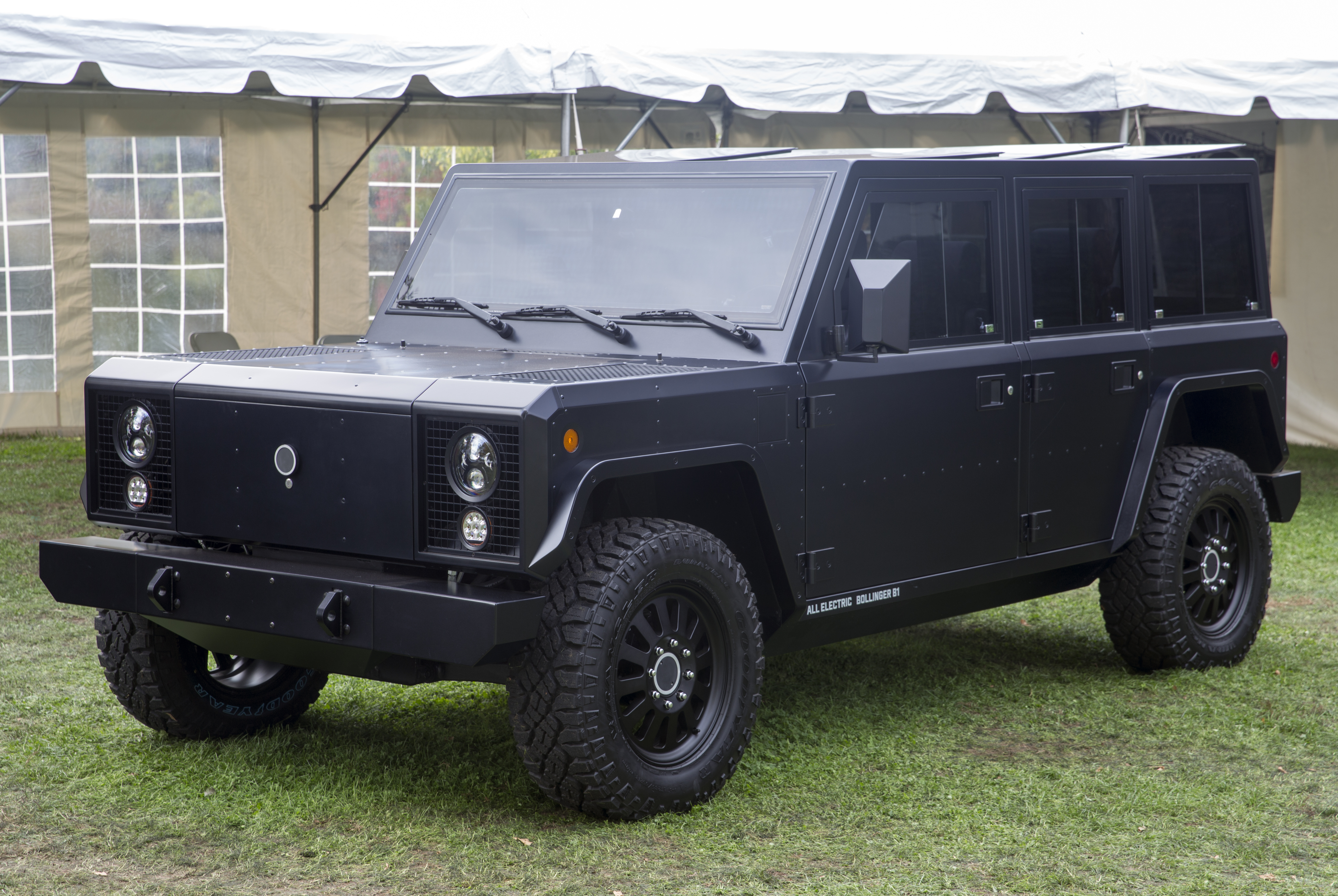
Bollinger B1

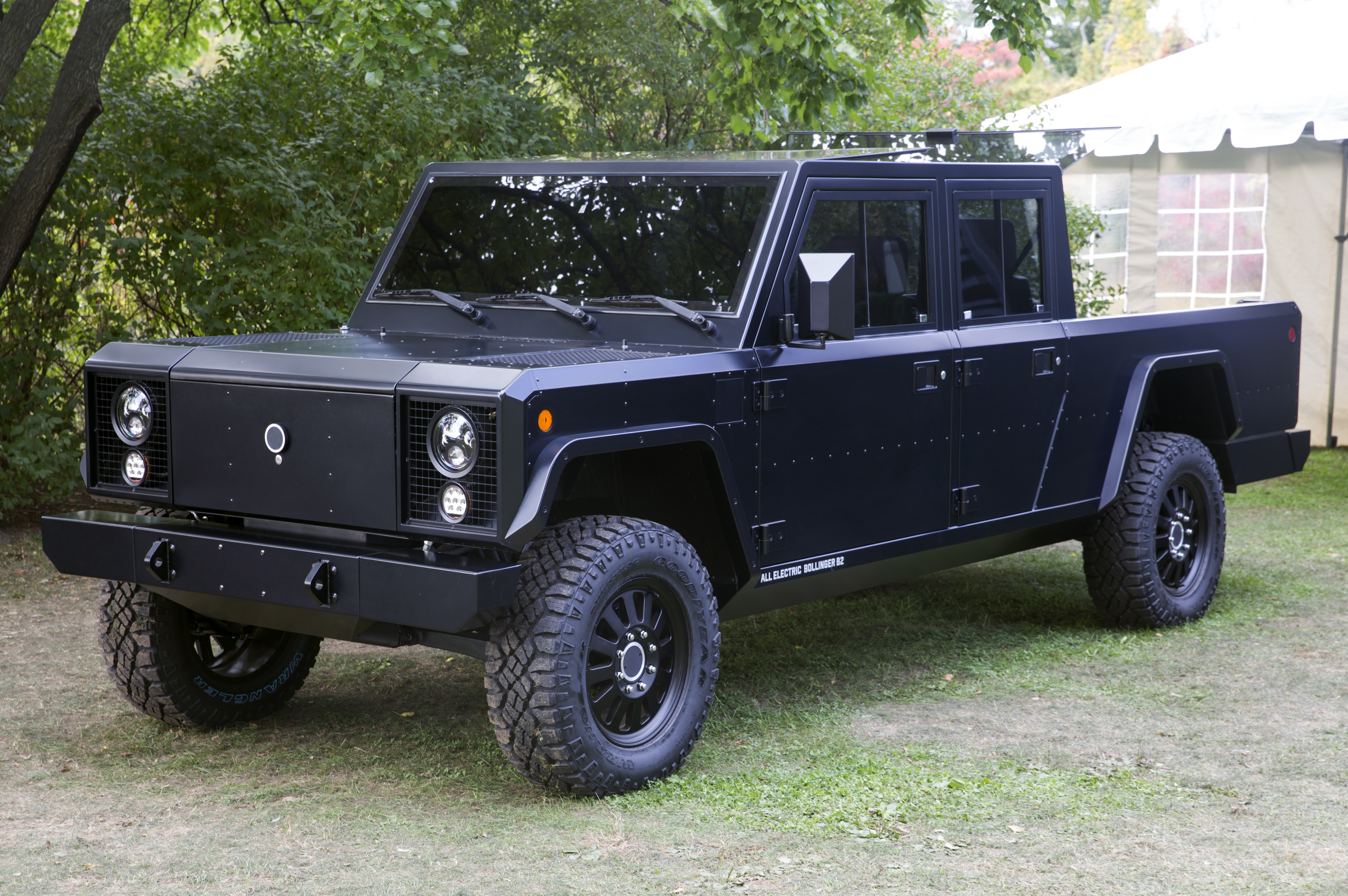
Bollinger B2

Photographed at the Greenwich Concours d'Elegance, Oct 2021

=== Growth ===
In March 2018, Bollinger decided to move its headquarters from Hobart, New York, to Ferndale, Michigan. Two years after the presentation of the B1 prototype, in September 2019, Bollinger presented its first two cars as production-ready prototypes. The production variant of the B1 model underwent cosmetic changes in the exterior and became longer with an additional set of rear doors and a large 4-door B2 pickup was added to the line.

Both the B1 and B2 were built on what Bollinger called its E-Chassis; Bollinger stated in March 2020 the largely symmetric E-Chassis, which had double wishbone independent suspension at all four wheels, would be made available for commercial upfitters in 2021. In April 2020, Bollinger announced that serial production and sales of both B1 and B2 models would start in 2021 and showed renderings of a B2 chassis cab model, offering the cab section of the B2 in 2- and 4-door versions with a variety of wheelbases to accommodate a variety of commercial uses. In August 2020, the company headquarters moved from Ferndale to Oak Park, Michigan. 1,000 preorders were received for the B1 and B2 trucks by the fall, with interested potential owners paying a refundable US$1,000 deposit.

Also in August 2020, Bollinger showed renderings of the Deliver-E, a panel van designed for package delivery companies spanning multiple weight classes, from Class 2B to 5, and a choice of wheelbases. The Deliver-E does not use the E-Chassis and would include a variety of battery capacity options for the van-specific platform, which would be equipped with front-wheel drive.

In March 2021, Bollinger announced the B2 cutaway chassis cab and E-Chassis had been renamed to the B3 Chass-E Cab (with a 2-door cab) and Chass-E, respectively, and provided prices for rear-wheel drive, rear-wheel drive with dual rear wheels, and all-drive versions.

In mid-January 2022, the company announced a major shift in direction, postponing the development of its consumer models in favor of a commercial vehicle platform, saying it would refund B1 and B2 deposits. The Bollinger Commercial Platform for medium-duty Class 3-6 trucks is a rear-drive skateboard chassis with a leaf-sprung rear live axle and front double wishbone suspension that will be offered to upfitters, which will use the platform as the basis for tow trucks, trash trucks, buses and other commercial EVs. In May 2022, Roush Industries was announced as the manufacturing partner for the Commercial Platform and the Deliver-E van. In September 2022, renderings of the Commercial Platform-based Bollinger B4 cab-forward medium-duty Class 4 truck were unveiled.

Also in September 2022, Mullen Automotive acquired a 60% controlling interest in Bollinger Motors for US$148.2 million. The news spurred speculation the B1/B2 could be relaunched.

=== Decline ===
In May 2025, Bollinger Motors was put into receivership after a financial dispute between Robert Bollinger, who had stepped away from the company in 2024, and Mullen Automotive.

The company exited receivership with Mullen Automotive and its CEO, David Michery, assuming full control of the company. Michery promised that all outstanding debts would be paid and investments would be made to expand Bollinger’s product line-up. Mullen then renamed itself Bollinger Innovations to try to escape reputations for its CEO, a record number of reverse stock splits, and the Mullen product line which were just rebadged Chinese knock-down kits. But the promised investments and payments to vendors were not made. So, Bollinger Motors had to lay off its employees and closed its doors in November 2025. The company reentered receivership soon afterwards.

Robert Bollinger purchased the remaining assets and intellectual property of Bollinger Motors at a court auction for $250,000 in early 2026. He placed them under control of a new LLC, Robert Bollinger Design, and said he planned to figure out what would come next for the firm's designs.

== Products ==
- B1 (postponed indefinitely)
- B2 (postponed indefinitely)
- B3 Chass-E Cab / E-Chassis (cancelled)
- B4 (Class 4 truck)
- B5 (Class 5 truck)
- B6 (Class 6 truck)
- Commercial Platform (medium-duty Class 3-6 trucks, GVWR 10,001–26,000 lb (4,536–11,793 kg))
- Deliver-E (medium-duty Class 2b-5 vans, GVWR 8,501–19,500 lb (3,856–8,845 kg))
- Bollinger Urban Delivery/Mullen ONE

== See also ==
- Munro Vehicles
