= John G. Bollinger =

American mechanical engineer

Dr. John G. Bollinger was the Dean Emeritus, College of Engineering & Professor Emeritus of Industrial and Systems Engineering, University of Wisconsin-Madison.

== Education ==
- BS, Mechanical Engineering (1957), UW-Madison
- MS, Mechanical Engineering (EE minor) (1958), Cornell University College of Engineering
- PhD, Mechanical Engineering (EE minor) (1961), UW-Madison

== Career ==
Bollinger was on the faculty of the University of Wisconsin-Madison from 1960 through 2000, and was a Fulbright fellow in Germany at the Machine Tool and Industrial Organization Institute in Aachen (1962–63) and England where he was a visiting professor at the Cranfield Institute of Technology (1980–81).

Bollinger served as Dean from July 1981 until September 1999. Prior to being Dean, he was Director of the Data Acquisition and Simulation Laboratory and Chairman of the Department of Mechanical Engineering.

He was elected a member of the National Academy of Engineering in 1983 for outstanding research on machine tools, sensors, and controls for manufacturing equipment, and leadership in education and the engineering profession.

In 1992, he was named a director of Enhanced Imaging Technologies Inc. in Irvine, California.

Bollinger died in early April 2022.
