= Bollinger (surname) =

Bollinger is a habitational surname for someone from any of three places called Bollingen, in Schwyz, Württemberg, and Oldenburg. Notable people with the surname include:

- Albert Bollinger (1870–1933), American lawyer, businessman, politician
- Brian Bollinger (born 1968), American football player
- Brooks Bollinger (born 1979), American football player
- Donald G. Bollinger (1915–2000), American shipbuilder and politician
- Donald T. (Boysie) Bollinger (born 1949), American shipbuilder and philanthropist
- Doug Bollinger (born 1981), Australian cricketer
- Jan Bollinger (born 1977), German politician
- John Bollinger (born 1950), American financial analyst
- John G. Bollinger, professor of engineering
- John Bollinger, a baby who was refused treatment by Doctor Harry J. Haiselden
- Lee Bollinger (born 1946), American university president
- Lily Bollinger, ran the Bollinger champagne house from 1941 to 1971
- George Frederick Bollinger (1770–1842), American settler
- Otto Bollinger (1843–1909), German pathologist
- Terry Bollinger (born 1955), American writer
