= Ibex (vehicle) =

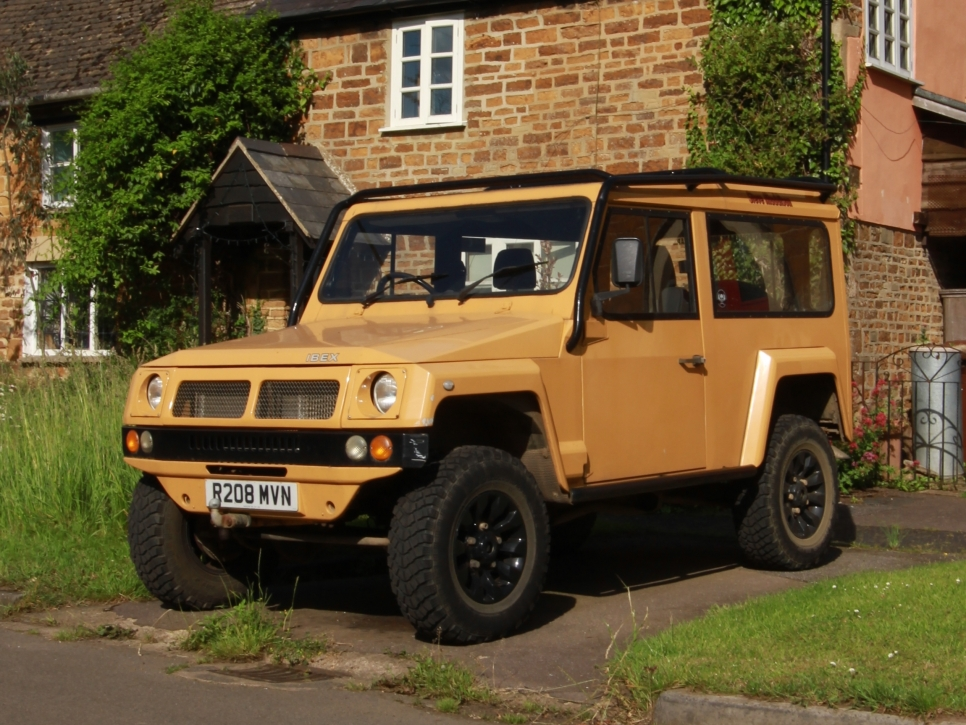
A 1997 Ibex with two-door body

Ibex is an off-road vehicle, made by Foers Engineering Ltd in Rotherham, South Yorkshire, England. Foers offer the Ibex either ready-built or as a kit to build with donor parts from a Land Rover Defender on a monocoque chassis.

Foers offers the Ibex with a range of different wheelbases and body types.

Among other features, the Ibex can be built or delivered with Foer's patented Vector winch system. A winch is mounted centrally in the vehicle, and the cable runs to fairleads front and rear. This allows the vehicle to pull in either direction, or pull out the cable and secure it both ways, so that the vehicle can pull along the cable like a cable car.

There have been four generations of Ibex, from the Mk 1 in 1988 to the current Ibex F8.

== See also ==
- Auverland
- Cournil
- Ineos Grenadier
- JPX Montez
- Land Rover Defender
- UMM (União Metalo-Mecânica)
