= List of vans =

This page lists vans currently in production (as of 2013), as well as past models. The list includes minivans, passenger vans, and cargo vans.

Note: Many of the vehicles (both current and past) are related to other vehicles in the list. A vehicle listed as a 'past model' may still be in production in an updated form under a different name; it may be listed under that name in the 'currently in production' section. Also, some vehicles are sold under different marques in different geographical locations; therefore, some vehicles may be listed more than once but usually link to the same page. Example: the Dacia Lodgy is known as the Nissan Lodgy in the Philippines. Different states may also classify vehicles differently. What may be considered a van in one state, may not in another state.

† = no longer in production

Chevrolet

- †Chevrolet Van
- Chevrolet Express
- †Chevrolet City Express
- †Chevrolet Greenbrier

Chrysler

- Chrysler Pacifica

Dodge

- †Dodge Ram van
- †Dodge A100
- †Dodge Sprinter

Ford Motor Company

- †Ford Econoline
- Ford Transit
- †Ford Aerostar
- †Ford Windstar
- †Ford Taunus Transit
- †Ford S-Max

Force Motors

- Force Trax
- Force Traveller
- Force Urbania

GAZ

- †GAZ Sobol
- GAZelle

Hyundai

- †Hyundai Entourage
- †Hyundai Grace
- †Hyundai Lavita/Matrix
- †Hyundai Starex
- Hyundai Staria
- †Hyundai Trajet XG
- †Hyundai H350

Isuzu

- †Isuzu Oasis
- †Isuzu Como
- †Isuzu Filly
- †Isuzu Elf

Iveco

- Iveco Daily

Jeep

- †Fleetvan FJ-3, FJ-6, FJ-9

Jowett

- †Jowett Bradford

Kia

- Kia Bongo
- Kia Carens/Rondo
- Kia Carnival/Sedona
- †Kia Carstar/Joice
- †Kia Pregio

LDV

- †LDV Pilot
- †LDV Convoy
- †LDV Cub
- †(returned in 2009 as the Maxus V80)LDV Maxus

Leyland

- †Leyland Sherpa

Lloyd

- †Lloyd LT 400, 600

Luxgen

- †Luxgen M7

Mahindra

- †Mahindra Xylo
- †Mahindra Maxximo
- Mahindra Jeeto

Mazda

- †Mazda Bongo/Bongo Brawny
- †Mazda Bongo Friendee
- †Mazda MPV

Mercedes-Benz

- †Mercedes-Benz L319
- †Mercedes-Benz T1
- †Mercedes-Benz T2
- †Mercedes-Benz Vaneo
- †Mercedes-Benz Vario
- Mercedes-Benz Vito
- Mercedes-Benz Sprinter
- Mercedes-Benz V-Class

Mercury

- †Mercury Villager
- †Mercury Monterey

Mitsubishi

- †Mitsubishi Expo
- †Mitsubishi Minica
- †Mitsubishi Town Box
- Mitsubishi L300

Morris

- †Morris Cowley
- †Morris Minor
- †Morris J4

Nissan

- †Datsun Cablight
- †Datsun Litevan
- Nissan AD
- Nissan Atlas/Atlas Walkthrue/Atlas Loco/Atlas MAX
- Nissan Bluebird van
- Datsun/Nissan Cabstar
- †Nissan Cedric van
- †Prince Gloria van/Nissan Gloria van
- †Nissan Cherry van
- Nissan Interstar
- †Nissan Kubistar
- Nissan NV200
- †Nissan NV300
- Nissan NV350 Caravan
- †Nissan NV400
- †Nissan NV1500
- †Nissan NV2500
- †Nissan NV3500
- †Nissan Prairie
- Nissan Primastar
- †Nissan Quest
- †Nissan S-Cargo
- Nissan Serena
- †Nissan Silkroad
- †Nissan Skyline van
- †Nissan Sunny van
- †Nissan Vanette
- †Nissan Lodgy

Oldsmobile

- †Oldsmobile Silhouette

Opel/Vauxhall

- †Opel Astravan
- †Opel Bedford Blitz
- †Opel Blitz
- Opel Combo (Vauxhall in UK, Holden in Australia and Chevrolet in Chile and Argentina)
- †Opel Corsavan
- †Opel Kadett Combo
- †Opel Movano A/B
- Opel Movano C
- †Opel Sintra
- †Opel Vivaro B
- Opel Vivaro C

Peugeot

- †Peugeot J 7, J 9
- †Peugeot J5
- Peugeot Boxer
- Peugeot Expert
- Peugeot Partner

Plymouth

- †Plymouth Voyager

Proton

- †Proton Exora
- †Proton Juara

Pyonghwa

- Pyongwha Ppeokkugi

Pontiac

- †Pontiac Montana
- †Pontiac Trans Sport

Ram Trucks

- †Ram C/V
- Ram ProMaster

Renault

- †Renault Estafette
- †Renault Espace
- Renault Kangoo
- Renault Trafic
- Renault Master

Riga Autobus Factory

- †RAF-251
- †RAF-08
- †RAF-10
- †RAF-2203
- †RAF-22031
- †RAF-3311
- †RAF-33111
- †RAF-977

SAIC-GM-Wuling

- Wuling Rongguang
- †Wuling Hongtu
- †Wuling Xingwang
- †Liuzhou Wuling LZ 110
- †Wuling Dragon
- †Wuling City Breeze
- †Wuling Windside
- Wuling Sunshine

Saturn

- †Saturn Relay

SEAT

- †SEAT Inca

SsangYong

- †Istana
- †Rodius/Stavic

Subaru

- †Subaru 360 Comercial/Van
- †Subaru Domingo
- †Subaru Leone van
- Subaru Sambar

Suzuki

- Suzuki Alto
- †Suzuki Carry
- Suzuki Super Carry
- Suzuki Every
- †Autozam Scrum
- †Bedford Rascal
- †Holden Scurry
- †Maruti Versa
- Suzuki Ertiga

Tatra

- †Tatra 12
- †Tatra Beta

Tata Motors

- Tata Magic
- †Tata Magic Iris
- Tata Winger

Tempo

- †Tempo Rapid
- †Tempo Wiking
- †Tempo Matador
- †Tempo Traveller

Toyota

- †Tyopet Coronaline/Corona van/Toyota Corona van
- †Toyopet/Toyota Crown van
- †Toyopet Masterline
- †Toyota Carina van
- †Toyota Corolla van
- Toyota Dyna
- Toyota Granvia
- Toyota Hiace
- †Toyota Regius Ace
- †Toyota Liteace
- †Toyota Mark II van
- Toyota Noah/Voxy
- †Toyota Master Ace Surf Wagon / Van
- Toyota ProAce
- †Toyota Previa
- Toyota Probox
- †Toyota Publica van
- †Toyota Quick Delivery / Urban Supporter
- Toyota Sienna
- †Toyota Succeed
- †Toyota ToyoAce
- Toyota TownAce
- Toyota Coaster

Ulyanovsk Automobile Plant

- †UAZ-452
- †UAZ Simba

Vauxhall and Bedford

- †Bedford Beagle
- †Bedford CA
- †Bedford CF
- †Bedford Chevanne
- Vauxhall Combo see Opel
- †Vauxhall Corsavan
- †Vauxhall Astravan
- †Vauxhall Rascal
- Vauxhall Vivaro
- †Vauxhall Movano 1/2
- Vauxhall Movano 3

Volkswagen Commercial Vehicles

- Volkswagen Caddy
- †Volkswagen Routan
- †(T4) Transporter / Kombi / Caravelle / Eurovan / Mutlivan
- †(T5) Transporter / Eurovan / Kombi / Caravelle / Mutlivan
- Volkswagen California
- †Volkswagen LT
- Volkswagen Crafter
- †Volkswagen Type 2 ("VW Bus")
- †Volkswagen Type 2 (T2)

List of Vans
| Company | Van | Also Called | Class | Years In Production | Regions Sold |
|---|---|---|---|---|---|
| Asia | Topic | ---- | ---- | Unknown | Unknown |
| Asia | Asia Tower | Tower | ---- | Unknown | Unknown |
| BMC Commercial Vehicles | Unknown | Unknown | ---- | Unknown | Unknown |
| Buick | Terraza | Chevrolet Uplander, Pontiac SV6, Oldsmobile Silhouette | Luxury fullsize Minivan | 2005–2007 | United States, Canada, Mexico, Israel |
| Buick/Shanghai GM | GL8(1st Gen) | ---- | Luxury fullsize Minivan | 2000–Present | China |
| Buick/Shanghai GM | GL8(2nd Gen) | ---- | Luxury fullsize Minivan | 2010–Present | China, Philliphines |
| BYD | BYD M6 | ---- | Fullsize Minivan | 2010–2017 | Worldwide |
| Chery | A18 | ---- | micro passenger van | ????-present | China, Taiwan |
| Chery | S22 | ---- | micro passenger van | ????-present | China, Taiwan |
| Chery | Q21 | ---- | micro passenger van | ????-present | China |
| Chery | Q22 | ---- | micro passenger van | ????-present | China |
| Chery | Q1LD | ---- | micro passenger van | ????-present | China |
| Chery | H5 | Toyota HiAce, Higer KLQ6540, JiangNan JNQ6495D1 | Midsize passenger van | ????-present | China |
| Chery | V5 | ---- | compact minivan | 2008–2015 | China, Taiwan, South East Asia, Iran, South America |
| Chevrolet | Chevrolet CMV | Suzuki Carry, Maruti Omni, GM Damas, Holden Scurry, Ford Pronto, Mazda Scrum, Mitsubishi Colt T120SS | micro passenger/Cargo van | 1991–present | Central America |
| Chevrolet/Wuling | NP200 | Wuling Hongtu | micro passenger van | 2008–2012 | Peru, North Africa, Middle East |
| Chevrolet | Astro | GMC Safari | Midsize passenger/Cargo Van | 1995-2005 | North America, Japan |
| Chevrolet | Van | GMC Vandura | Fullsize passenger/Cargo van | 1961-1996 | North America |
| Chevrolet | Greenbrier | ---- | Fullsize passenger van | 1961-1965 | United States, Canada, Mexico |
| Chevrolet | Express | GMC Savana | Fullsize passenger/Cargo van | 1996–present | North America |
| Chevrolet | Vivant | Daewoo Tacuma | compact minivan | 2000-2008 | South Africa, South America, Vietnam, Central Asia |
| Chevrolet | Lumina APV | Pontiac Trans Sport, Oldsmobile Silhouette | fullsize minivan | 1989-1996 | North America |
| Chevrolet | Venture | Pontiac Trans Sport Montana, Oldsmobile Silhouette | fullsize minivan | 1996-2005 | United States, Canada, Mexico |
| Chevrolet | Uplander | Buick Terraza, Pontiac SV6 | fullsize minivan | 2005-2008 | United States, Canada, Mexico, Chile, Middle East |
| Chrysler | Pacifica | ---- | Luxury fullsize minivan | 2017–present | United States, Canada, Mexico |
| Chrysler | Town & Country | ---- | Luxury fullsize minivan | 1989–2017 | United States, Canada, Mexico |
| Chrysler | Voyager | Lancia Voyager | Luxury fullsize minivan | 1988–present | worldwide, except USA, Canada, Mexico, Europe (except UK and Ireland), Africa (except South Africa and Egypt), South Asia, South East Asia |
| Chrysler | Valiant Panelvan | ---- | Fullsize Panelvan | 1977-1980 | Australia |
| Citroën | 2CV Panel Van | ---- | micro cargo van | 1948-1990 | worldwide |
| Citroën | C15 | Fiat 242 | compact passenger van | 1984-2005 | Europe |
| Citroën | Jumpy | Citroën SpaceTourer (3rd Generation), Peugeot Traveller, Peugeot Expert, Citroën Dispatch, Fiat Scudo, Toyota ProAce, Toyota ProAce Verso | compact passenger/cargo van | 1995-2017 | Europe, Middle East, South America, Australia, China, Taiwan |
| Citroën | Berlingo | ---- | compact passenger van | 1996–present | Europe, Middle East |
| Citroën | H Van | ---- | Fullsize cargo van | 1947-1981 | Europe(except UK) |
| Citroën | Jumper | Alfa Romeo AR6, Peugeot J5, Citroën C25, Talbot Express, Peugeot Boxer, Zastava Ducato, Fiat Ducato, Ram ProMaster, Toyota ProAce | Fullsize passenger/cargo van | 1994–present | Europe |
| Citroën | C4 Picasso | ---- | compact minivan | 2006–2022 | Europe |
| Citroën | C8 | Fiat Ulysse, Lancia Zeta, Peugeot 806 | large minivan | 1998-2010 | Europe |
| Commer | Commer FC | Commer PB & SpaceVan | commercial vehicles | 1960-1976 | Britain |
| Dacia | Dacia Logan VAN | ---- | compact cargo van | 2007-2012 | Europe(Except UK), Northern Africa |
| Dacia | Dokker | Renault Dokker | compact passenger/cargo van | 2012–2021 | Europe(except United Kingdom), Northern Africa |
| Dacia | Lodgy | Nissan Lodgy, Renault Lodgy | compact minivan | 2012–2021 | Europe(except United Kingdom), Northern Africa |
| Daewoo | Damas Brand | Suzuki Carry, Maruti Omni, GM Damas, Holden Scurry, Ford Pronto, Mazda Scrum, Mitsubishi Colt T120SS | micro passenger/Cargo van | 1991–present | South Korea |
| Daewoo | Tacuma | Chevrolet Tacuma | compact minivan | 2000-2008 | South Korea |
| Daewoo | Istana | SsangYong Istana | compact passenger van | 1995-2003 | South Korea |
| Daihatsu | Hijet | Piaggio Porter, Subaru Dias Wagon, Toyota LiteAce, Piaggio Porter | micro cargo van | 1960–present | Asia, Africa, South America |
| Daihatsu | Pyzar | ---- | micro minivan | 1996-2002 | Asia, Europe |
| Daihatsu | Materia | Subaru Dex | micro minivan | 1996-2012 | Asia |
| Daihatsu | YRV | ---- | micro minivan | 2000-2005 | Asia, South America |
| Daihatsu | Xenia | FAW Senya M80 | compact minivan | 2007–2011 | Indonesia |
| Dodge | Coachman | ---- | ---- | ????-???? | ???? |
| Dodge | MB Series | ---- | ---- | ????-???? | ???? |
| Dodge | A100 | ---- | fullsize passenger van | 1964-1970 | United States, Canada |
| Dodge | Ram Van | ---- | fullsize passenger van | 1971-1978 | North America, South America, Australia, Middle East |
| Dodge | Dodge Sprinter | Freightliner Sprinter, Mercedes-Benz Sprinter, JAC Sunray, Volkswagen Crafter | Fullsize passenger/cargo van | 2001-2010 | United States, Canada, Mexico |
| Dodge | Caravan | Ram Cargo Van | fullsize minivan | 1984–2020 | United States, Canada, Mexico |
| Fiat Automobiles | Fiat 600 T | ---- | micro passenger van | ????-???? | Europe, Latin America, Middle East |
| Fiat Automobiles | Panda Van | SEAT Terra | compact cargo van | 1980-2003 | Europe, Latin America |
| Fiat Automobiles | Fiat 800 T | ---- | fullsize passenger van | ????-???? | Europe, Latin America, Middle East |
| Fiat Automobiles | 238 | ---- | fullsize passenger van | 1965-1983 | Europe, Middle East, Africa, South America |
| Fiat Automobiles | 242 | Citroën C35 | fullsize cargo van | 1974-1987 | Europe |
| Fiat Automobiles | Idea | ---- | micro minivan | 2003–2012 | Brazil |
| Fiat Automobiles | 500L | ---- | micro minivan | 2012–2022 | Europe, North America |
| Fiat Automobiles | Multipla | ---- | compact minivan | 1998-2010 | Europe, Brazil, China |
| Fiat Automobiles | Ulysee | Citroën C8, Lancia Zeta, Peugeot 806 | fullsize minivan | 1994-2010 | Europe |
| Fiat Professional | Doblò(1st Gen) | Pyongwha Ppeokkugi | compact passenger van | 2000–2010 | Latin America |
| Fiat Professional | Doblò(2nd Gen) | Opel Combo, Vauxhall Combo | compact passenger van | 2009–2022 | Europe, Latin America, Middle East, China |
| Fiat Professional | Fiorino(1st Gen) | Emelba 127 Poker, SEAT Fiorino | compact cargo van | 1977–1988 | Brazil |
| Fiat Professional | Fiorino(2nd Gen) | Citroën Nemo, Peugeot Bipper | compact cargo/Passenger van | 2007–2024 | Europe, Middle East, Australia, New Zealand, China, South East Asia |
| Fiat Professional | Scudo | Citroën Jumpy, Peugeot Expert, Toyota ProAce | midsize cargo/passenger van | 1995–present | Europe, Latin America, Middle East, South East Asia, China, Australia, New Zealand |
| Fiat Professional | Ducato | Peugeot Boxer, Citroën Relay, Citroën Jumper, Ram ProMaster, Alfa Romeo AR6, Peugeot J5, Citroën C25, Talbot Express, Zastava Ducato | Fullsize passenger/Cargo van | 1981–present | Europe, South America, Middle East, Australia, New Zealand, China, South East Asia |
| Ford | B-Max | compact Minivan | ---- | 2012–2019 | Europe |
| Ford | C-Max | Ford C-Max Hybrid, Ford C-Max Energi | Midsize Minivan | 2003–2019 | Europe, North America |
| Ford | Aerostar | ---- | Fullsize Minivan | 1986-1997 | North America |
| Ford | Windstar | Ford Freestar | Fullsize Minivan | 1994-2007 | North America |
| Ford | †Ford Escort (Europe) van | | compact cargo van | 1968-2002 | Europe, Latin America, Australia, New Zealand, Taiwan |
| Ford | Galaxy | ---- | Fullsize Minivan | 1995–2023 | Europe |
| Ford | S-Max | ---- | Fullsize Minivan | 2006–2023 | Europe |
| Ford | Model T Van | ---- | Compact Cargo van | Unknown-1927 | Unknown |
| Ford | Transit Connect | Ford Tourneo Connect | Compact Passenger/Cargo Van | 2002–present | Europe, the Americas, Middle East, China, Australia, New Zealand |
| Ford | Ford Econovan | Mazda Bongo, Mazda E-Series, Mazda Access, Mazda Marathon | Midsize Passenger/Cargo Van | 1983-Unknown | Japan, Oceania, Southeast Asia |
| Ford | Toureno Custom | ---- | Midsize Passenger Van | 2014- | Europe |
| Ford | E-Series | ---- | Fullsize Passenger/Cargo Van | 1961–present | United States, Canada, Mexico, Middle East |
| Ford | Ford Falcon Panelvan | ---- | Fullsize Panel-van | 1961-1999 | Australia, New Zealand |
| Ford | Escort Panelvan | ---- | Medium size Panel-Van | 1970-1982 | Australia |
| Ford | Transit | Ford Tourneo | Fullsize Passenger/Cargo Van | 1965–present | Europe, the Americas, Middle East |
| Ford | New Transit | ---- | Fullsize Passenger/Cargo Van | 2006–present | China |
| Freight Rover | Sherpa | ---- | Fullsize Passenger/Cargo Van | 1982-1984 | United Kingdom |
| Freight Rover | 200 Series | ---- | Fullsize Passenger/Cargo Van | 1989-2003 | United Kingdom |
| Freight Rover | 300 Series | ---- | Fullsize Passenger/Cargo Van | 1984-1989 | United Kingdom |
| Freightliner | Freightliner Sprinter | Mercedes-Benz Sprinter | Fullsize Passenger/Cargo Van | 1995–2021 | United States, Canada |
| GAZ | GAZelle | GAZ Vadai | Fullsize Passenger/Cargo Van | 1994–present | Russia |
| GAZ | Sobol | ---- | Fullsize Passenger/Cargo Van | 1999–present | Russia, Eastern Europe |
| FSC | Żuk | ---- | Midsize Passenger/Cargo Van | 1958-1998 | Eastern Europe |
| FSC | Nysa | ---- | Fullsize Passenger/Cargo Van | 1958-1994 | Eastern Europe |
| FSC | Lublin | ---- | Fullsize Passenger/Cargo Van | 1993-2007 | Eastern Europe |
| GMC | Safari | Chevrolet Astro | Minivan/Compact Cargo Van | 1995-2005 | United States, Canada, Mexico, Middle East |
| GMC | Gypsy | ---- | Fullsize Passenger Van | Unknown | Unknown |
| GMC | G-Series | GMC Gaucho, GMC Rally Wagon, GMC Vandura, GMC Handi-Van, Chevrolet Van, Chevrolet Beauville, Chevrolet G-Series, Chevrolet Sport Van | Fullsize Passenger Van | 1964-1996 | United States, Canada, Mexico |
| GMC | GMC Savana | Chevrolet Express | Fullsize Passenger/Cargo Van | 1996–present | United States, Canada, Mexico, Middle East |
| Glas | Goggomobile TL Van | ---- | Compact Cargo Van | 1957-1995 | Europe, United States, Canada |
| Grumman Olson | UPS P-600 | ---- | Large Step Van | Unknown-Present | United States, Canada, Mexico |
| Grumman Olson | UPS P-800 | ---- | Large Step Van | Unknown-Present | United States, Canada, Mexico |
| Hanomag | L28 | ---- | Fullsize Cargo Van | Unknown | Europe |
| Hanomag | Kurier | ---- | Fullsize Cargo Van | Unknown | Europe |
| Hanomag | F20 | ---- | Fullsize Passenger/Cargo Van | Unknown | Europe |
| Hino | Briska | ---- | Compact Passenger/Cargo Van | 1961-1968 | Asia Pacific, Middle East, Africa |
| Hino | Dutro Route Van | ---- | Fullsize Passenger Van | 1999–Present | Japan, South East Asia |
| Holden | Combo | Opel Combo C, Vauxhall Combo C, Chevrolet Combo C | Compact Cargo Van | 2001-2012 | Australia and New Zealand |
| Holden | Panelvan | ---- | Fullsize Panel-van | 1953-1984 | Australia, New Zealand |
| Holden | Gemini Van | ---- | Medium Size Panel-van | 1978-1984 | Australia |
| Holden | Scurry | Suzuki Carry | Light Van | 1985-1987 | Australia |
| Holden | Shuttle | Isuzu Fargo | Cargo/Passenger Van | 1982-1991 | Australia |
| Honda | Mobilio | ---- | Compact Minivan | 2001-2008 | Japan |
| Honda | Honda Perther | ---- | Compact Minivan | 1996-2010 | Japan |
| Honda | Honda Stepwgn | ---- | Midsize Minivan | 1996–present | Japan |
| Honda | Odyssey (North American Version) | ---- | Fullsize Minivan | 1994–present | North America, the Philippines, United Arab Emirates, and South Korea |
| Honda | Odyssey (international Version) | ---- | Fullsize Minivan | 1995–present | worldwide, except North America |
| Honda | Honda Elysion | ---- | Fullsize Minivan | 2000–present | Japan, South East Asia, China |
| Honda | Honda Acty | Honda Vamos | Micro Passenger/Cargo Van | 1977–2018 | Japan |
| Honda | Vamos | ---- | Micro Passenger Van | 1999–2018 | Japan |

== Alternative propulsion ==
Since light trucks are often operated in city traffic, hybrid electric models are very useful:

- Dual-Drive Sprinter - Mercedes Van equipped with hybrid drive systems
- Electric 35-50 q
- Micro-Vett Hybrid Daily
- Modec Van
- Smith Electric Vehicles Edison Van

== Wheelchair accessible ==
Some vans can be converted into wheelchair accessible vans for mobility impaired people.

The following vehicles may be used in yards or in historic city centres:

- Aixam Mega
- Alke' ATX
- Graf Carello Transporter
- Tasso Domino
