= Wuling Sunshine =

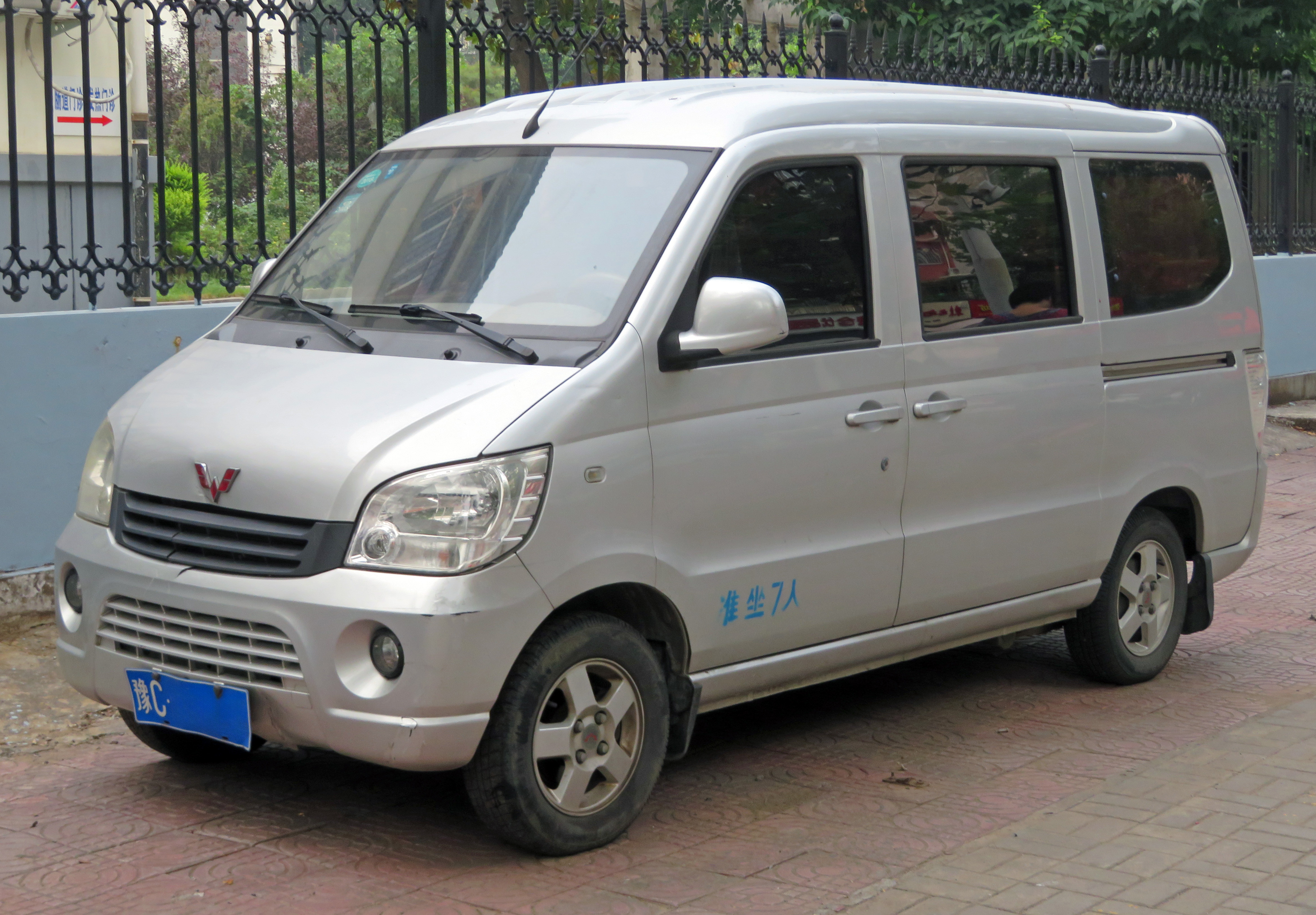

Overview
- Manufacturer: SAIC-GM-Wuling
- Production: 2002–present
- Assembly: China: Liuzhou, Guangxi

Body and chassis
- Class: Microvan
- Body style: Van

The Wuling Sunshine (Chinese: 五菱之光; pinyin: Wǔlíng Zhīguāng) is a five to eight-seater microvan made by SGMW (SAIC-GM-Wuling), a Chinese joint venture of SAIC with Liuzhou Wuling Motors Co and the U.S. carmaker General Motors.

== First generation (2002) ==
First generation
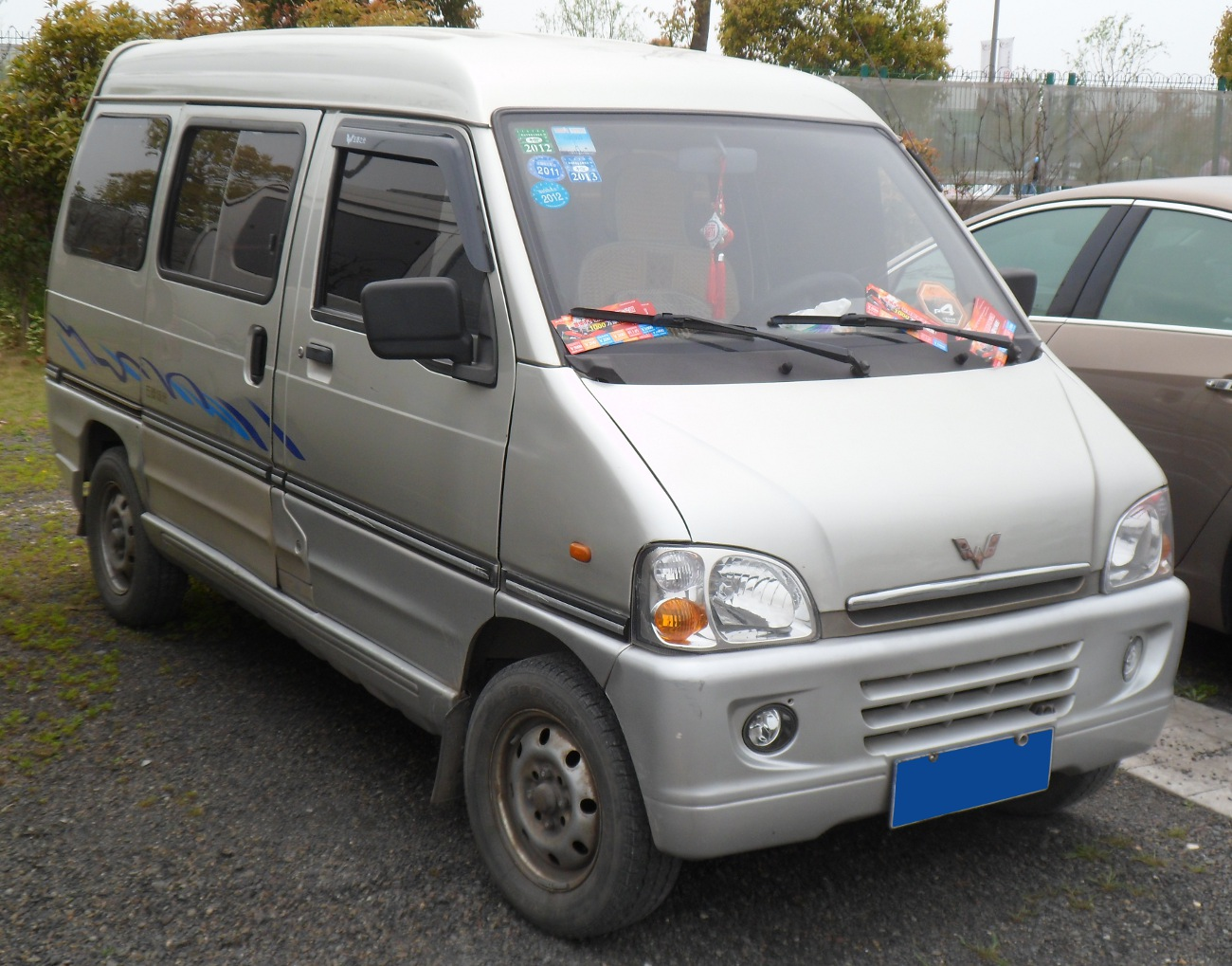

Overview
- Also called: Wuling LZW 6371-6376/6390 (LWB)/1027 (pickup); Wuling Zhiguang; Wuling Light; Wuling Yangguang A
- Production: 2002–present

Powertrain
- Engine: 1.0 L L2Y I4; 1.0 L LJ465Q3 I4; 1.0 L LJ465QR1E6 I4; 1.1 L LJ465Q1AE6 I4; 1.1 L LXA I4; 1.2 L LAQ I4; 1.2 L LQA I4
- Transmission: 5-speed manual

Dimensions
- Wheelbase: 2,500–2,750 mm (98.4–108.3 in)
- Length: 3,730–3,990 mm (146.9–157.1 in)
- Width: 1,510–2,750 mm (59.4–108.3 in)
- Curb weight: 985–1,030 kg (2,172–2,271 lb)

Chronology
- Predecessor: Wuling Dragon

The first generation Wuling Sunshine was launched in 2002, and sold until 2013. In 2011, 943,000 examples of the Sunshine were made, which made it the third best selling vehicle in the world. It was the best selling vehicle in China in 2010, 2011, 2012 and 2013.

A different model, known as the Wuling Hongtu in China, is also sold as the "Wuling Sunshine" in Singapore.

=== Specifications ===
The Wuling Sunshine is available with a range of petrol engines, with power outputs that vary from 34.7 to 63 kW (50-84 SAE HP), which consume between 6.8 and 7.8 L/100 km. The engine is mid-mounted, and drives the rear wheels via a five-speed manual gearbox. Brakes are hydraulic, with discs in front and drums at the rear, and steering is of the rack and pinion type.

The most basic version has two, rather than three rows of seats. Standard equipment on all versions is basic: air conditioning is optional, and windows are manually operated. Safety equipment is limited to seatbelts on the first two rows of seats.

There is a long wheel base version of the Wuling Sunshine that is 3995 mm long, with a wheelbase of 2750 mm, and it has a dry weight between 1010 and 1030 kg.

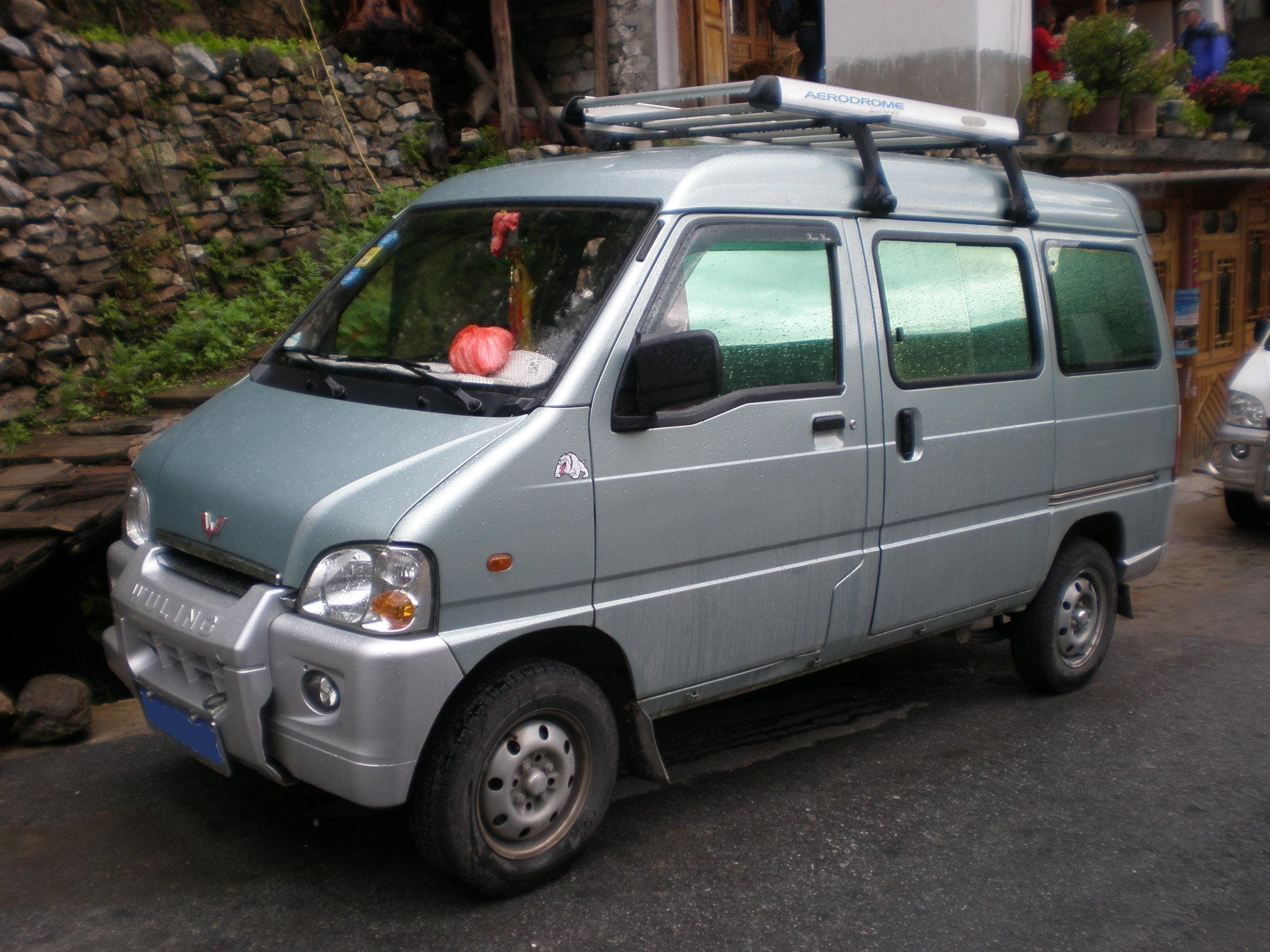
Wuling Sunshine LZW6371

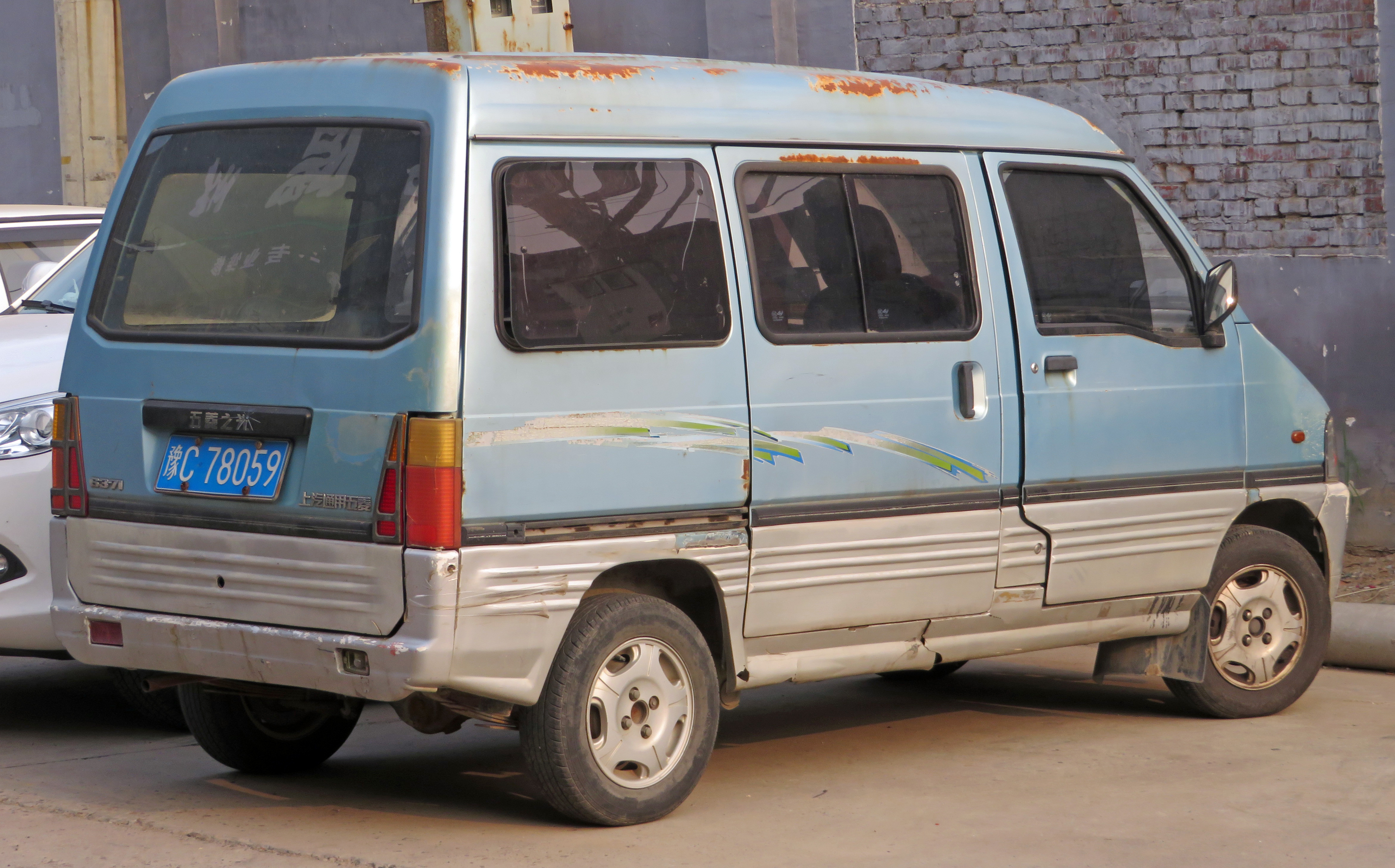
Rear view

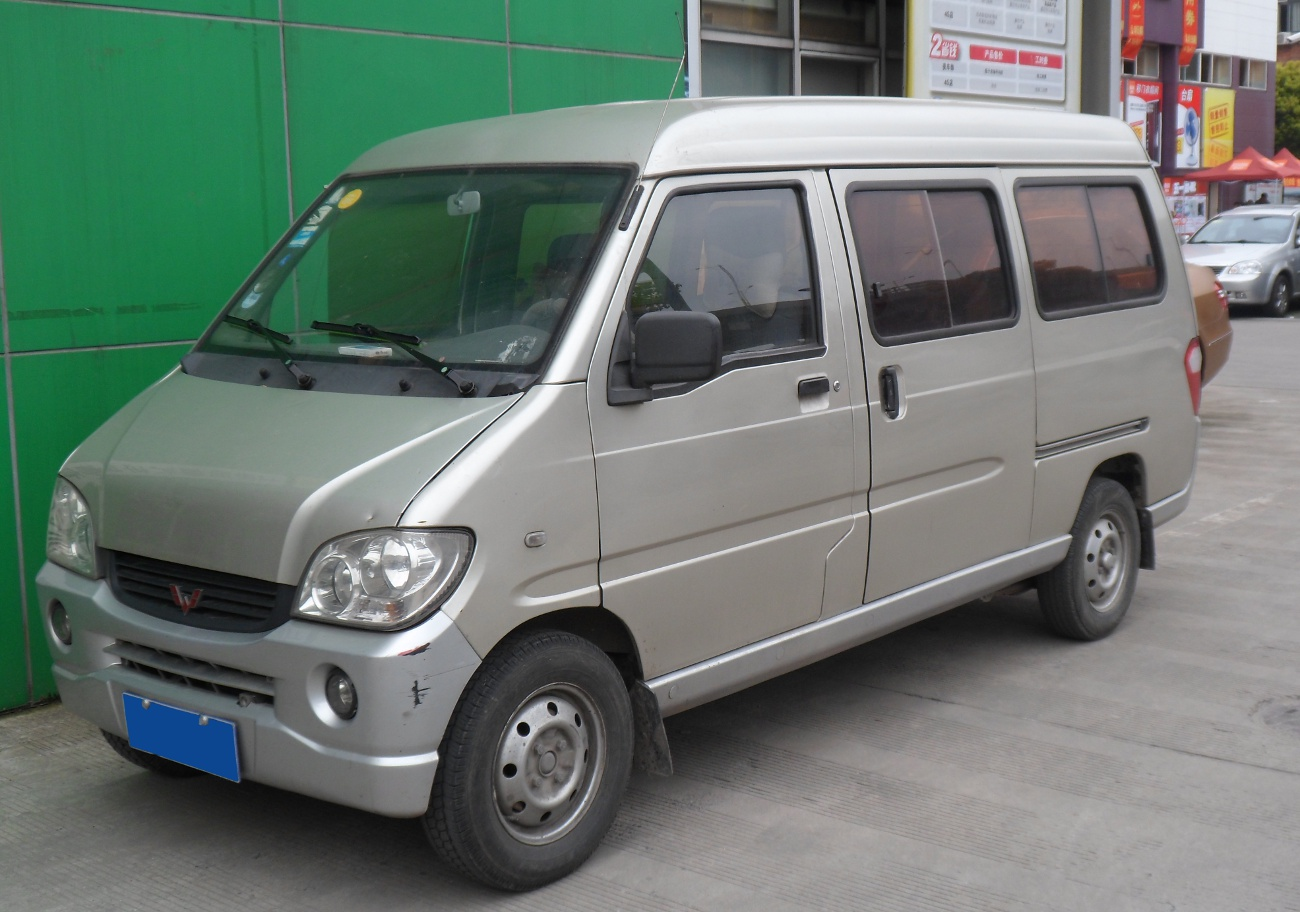
Wuling Sunshine 2006 (first facelift)

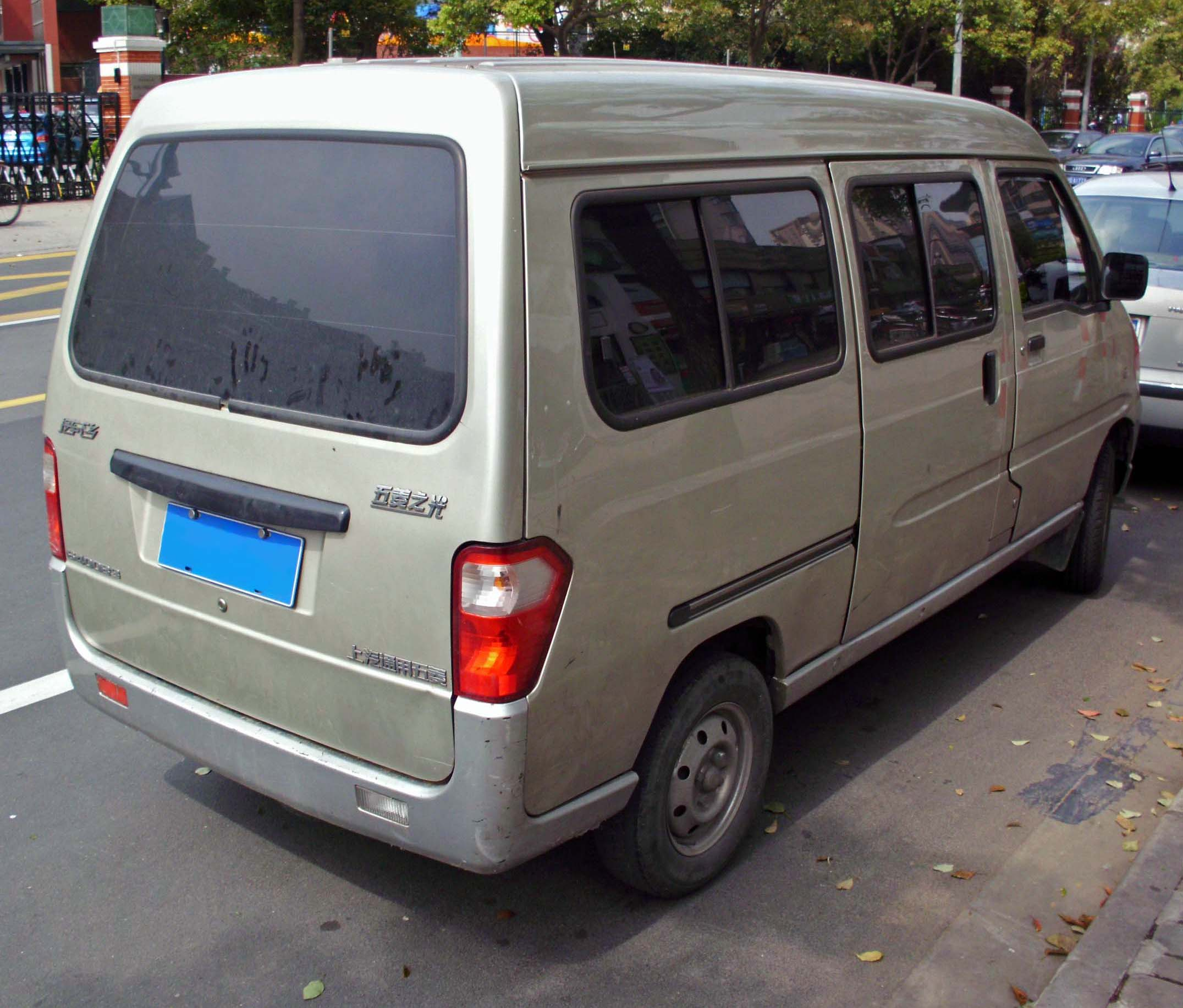
Rear view

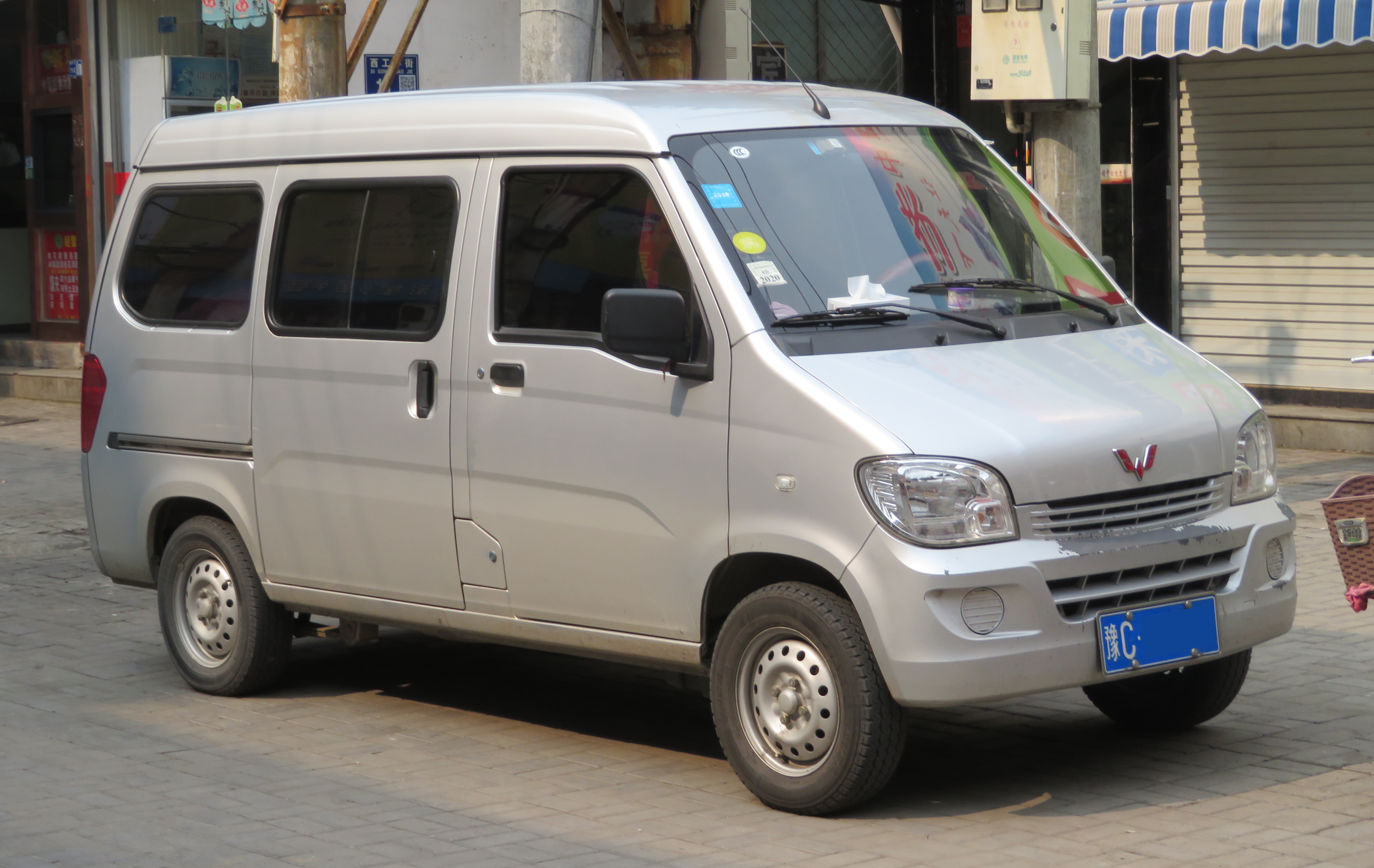
Wuling Sunshine 2013 (second facelift)

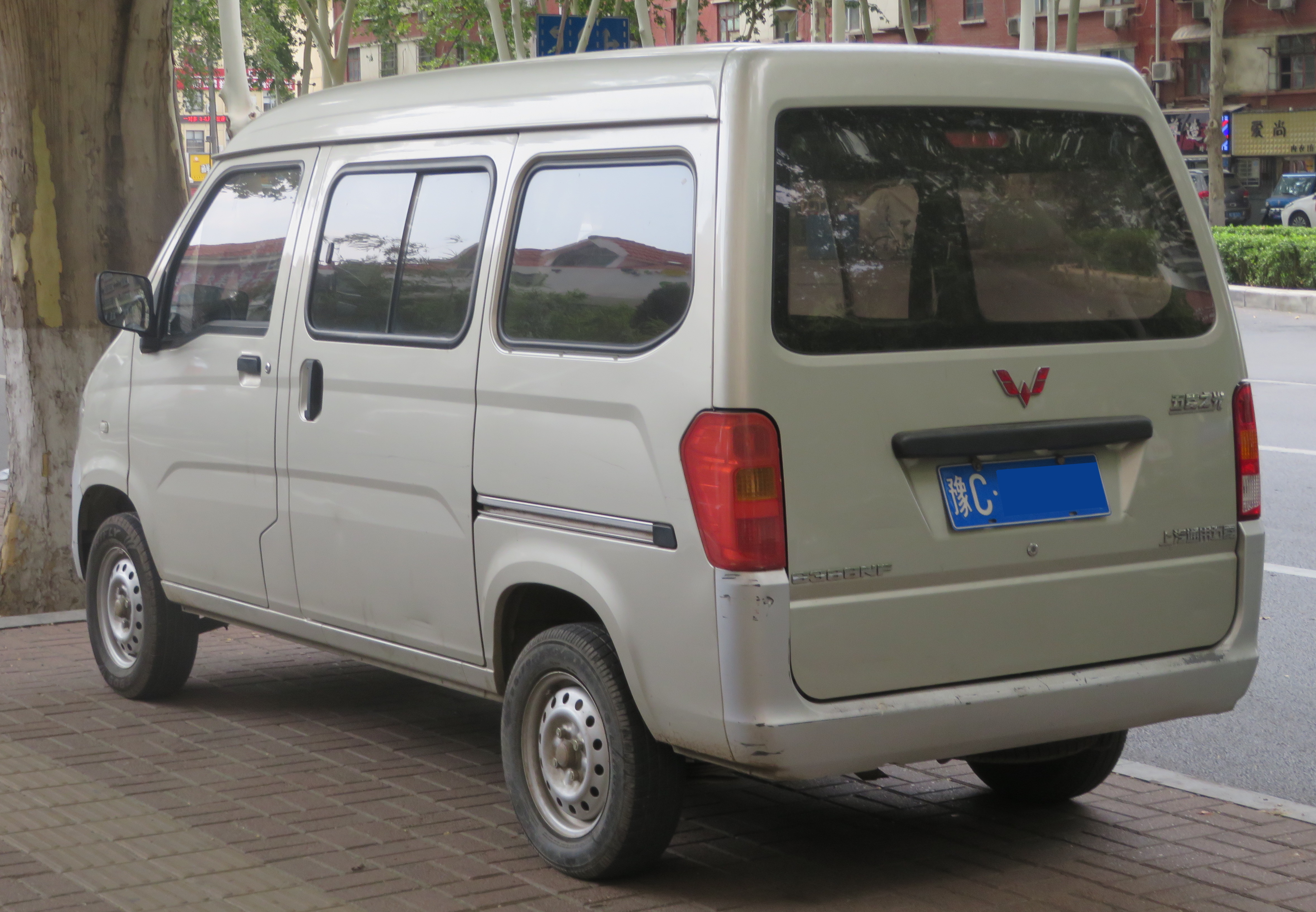
Rear view

== Second generation (New Sunshine, 2010) ==
Second generation
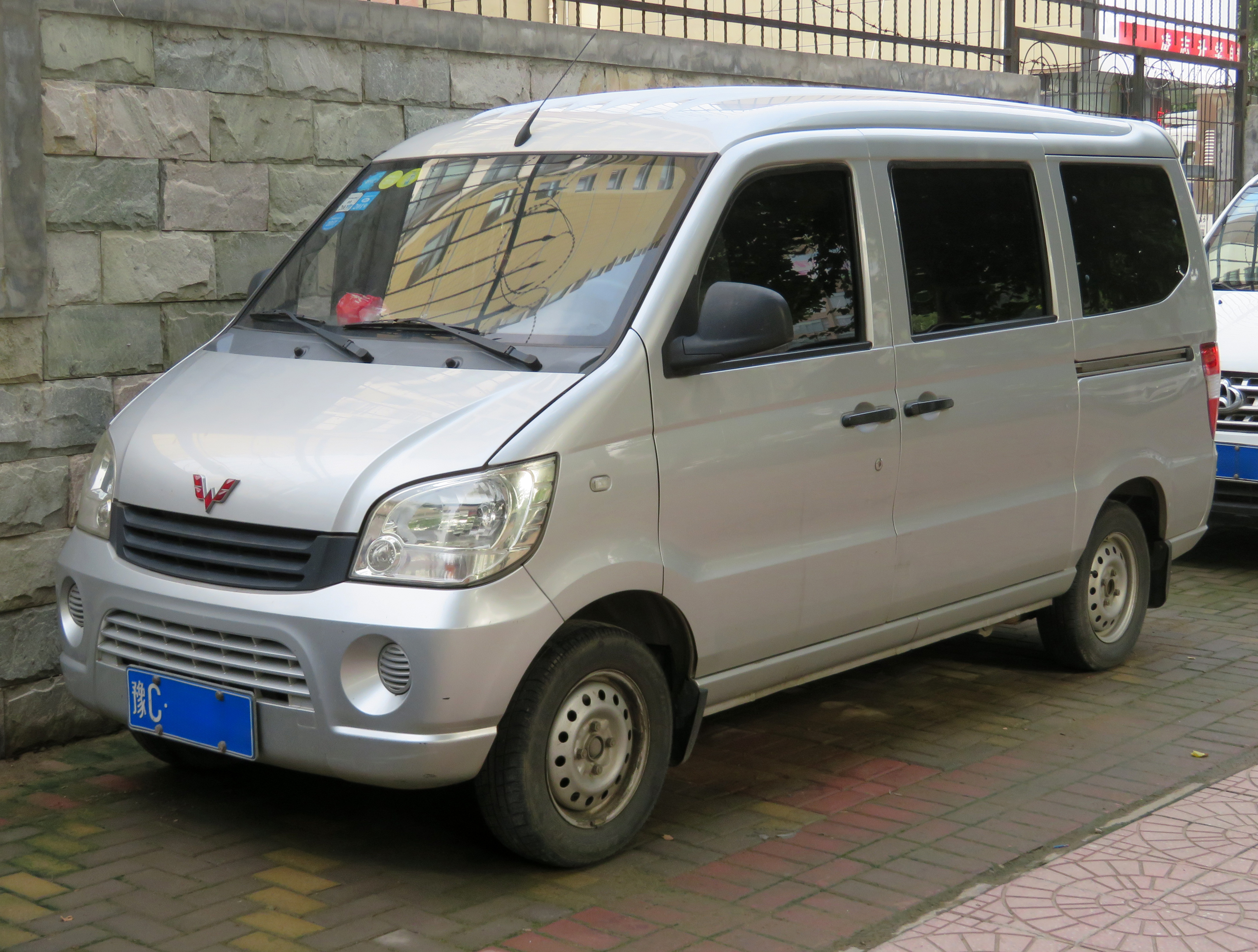

Overview
- Production: 2010–2022

Powertrain
- Engine: 1.0 L L2Y I4; 1.0 L LJ465Q3 I4; 1.0 L LJ465QR1E6 I4; 1.1 L LJ465Q1AE6 I4; 1.1 L LXA I4; 1.2 L LAQ I4; 1.2 L LQA I4
- Transmission: 5-speed manual

Dimensions
- Wheelbase: 2,500 mm (98.4 in)
- Length: 3,810 mm (150.0 in)
- Width: 1,510 mm (59.4 in)
- Height: 1,820 mm (71.7 in)

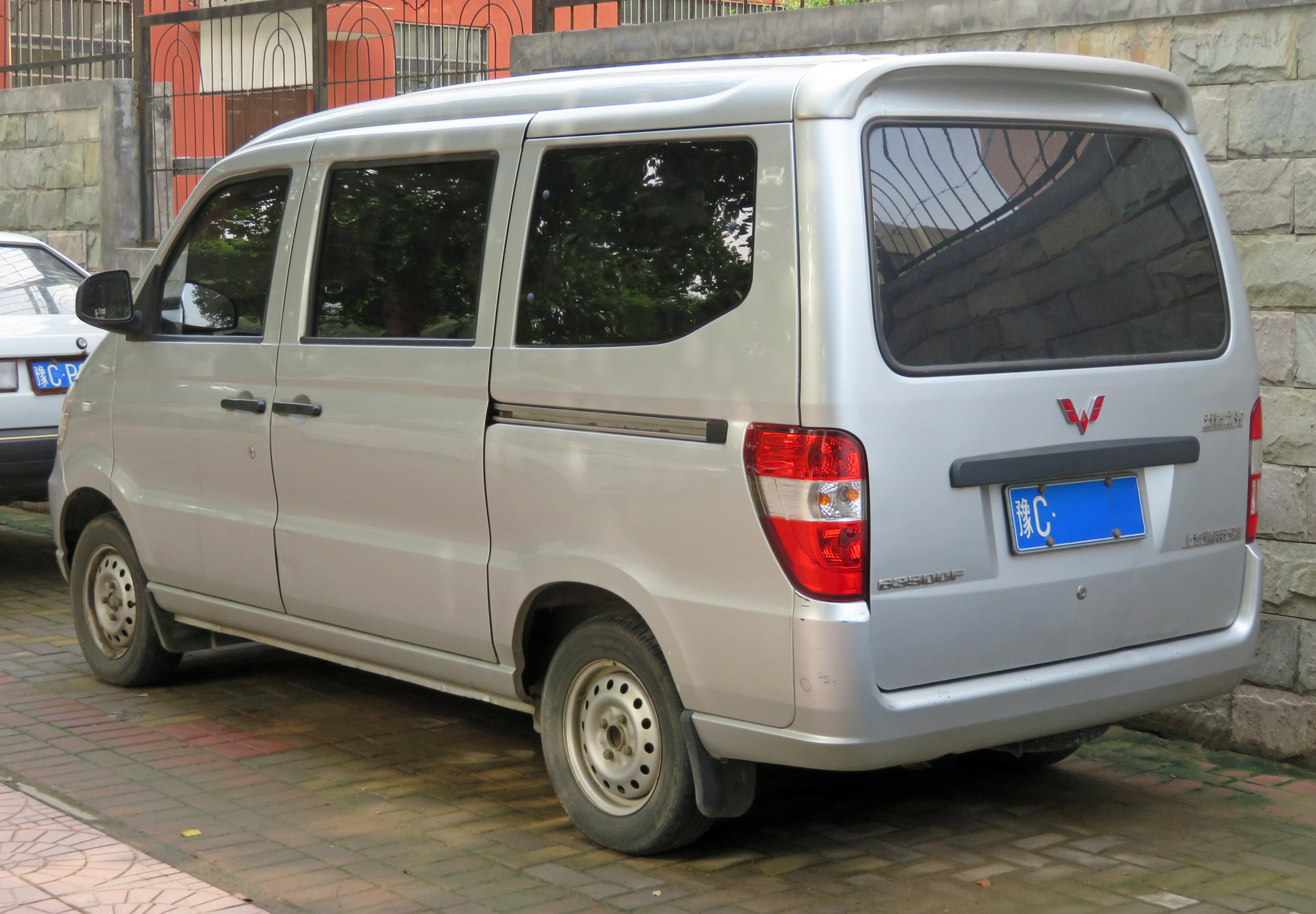
Rear view

A more recently developed, and slightly more expensive model called the new Wuling Sunshine (Wuling 6390, 新五菱之光). Both generations of models are sold side by side in China.

=== Powertrain ===
The second generation Wuling Sunshine or new Wuling Sunshine received an update for the 2013 model year, while the powertrain remains unchanged with the 1.0 liter engine developing 61 hp (45 kW) and 85 N⋅m (63 lb⋅ft) of torque mated to a 5-speed manual transmission.

== Wuling Sunshine S ==
Wuling Sunshine S
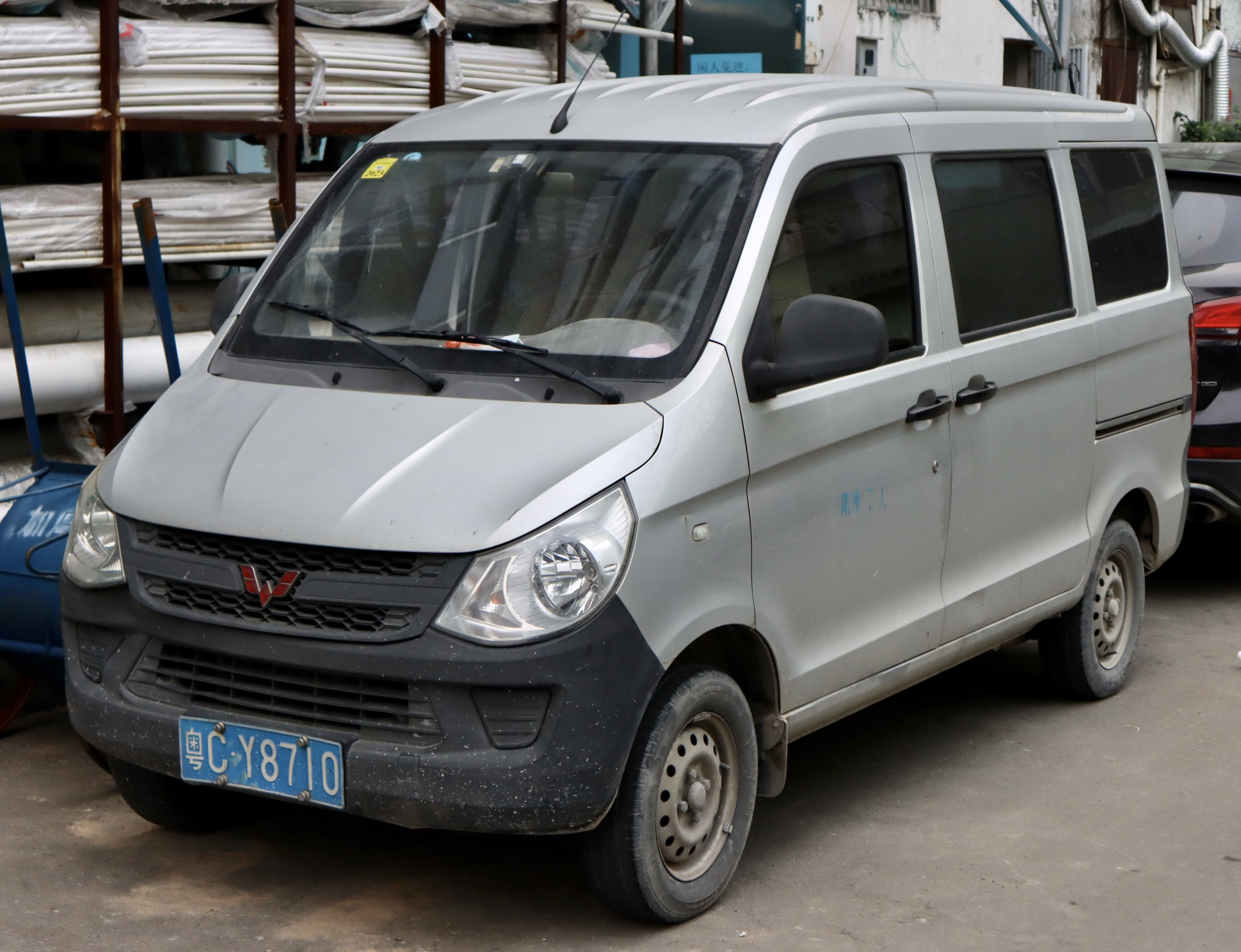

Overview
- Production: 2015–2020

Body and chassis
- Layout: Front-engine

Powertrain
- Engine: 1.2 L LSI I4
- Transmission: 5-speed manual

Dimensions
- Wheelbase: 2,500 mm (98.4 in)
- Length: 3,890 mm (153.1 in)
- Width: 1,580 mm (62.2 in)
- Height: 1,822 mm (71.7 in)

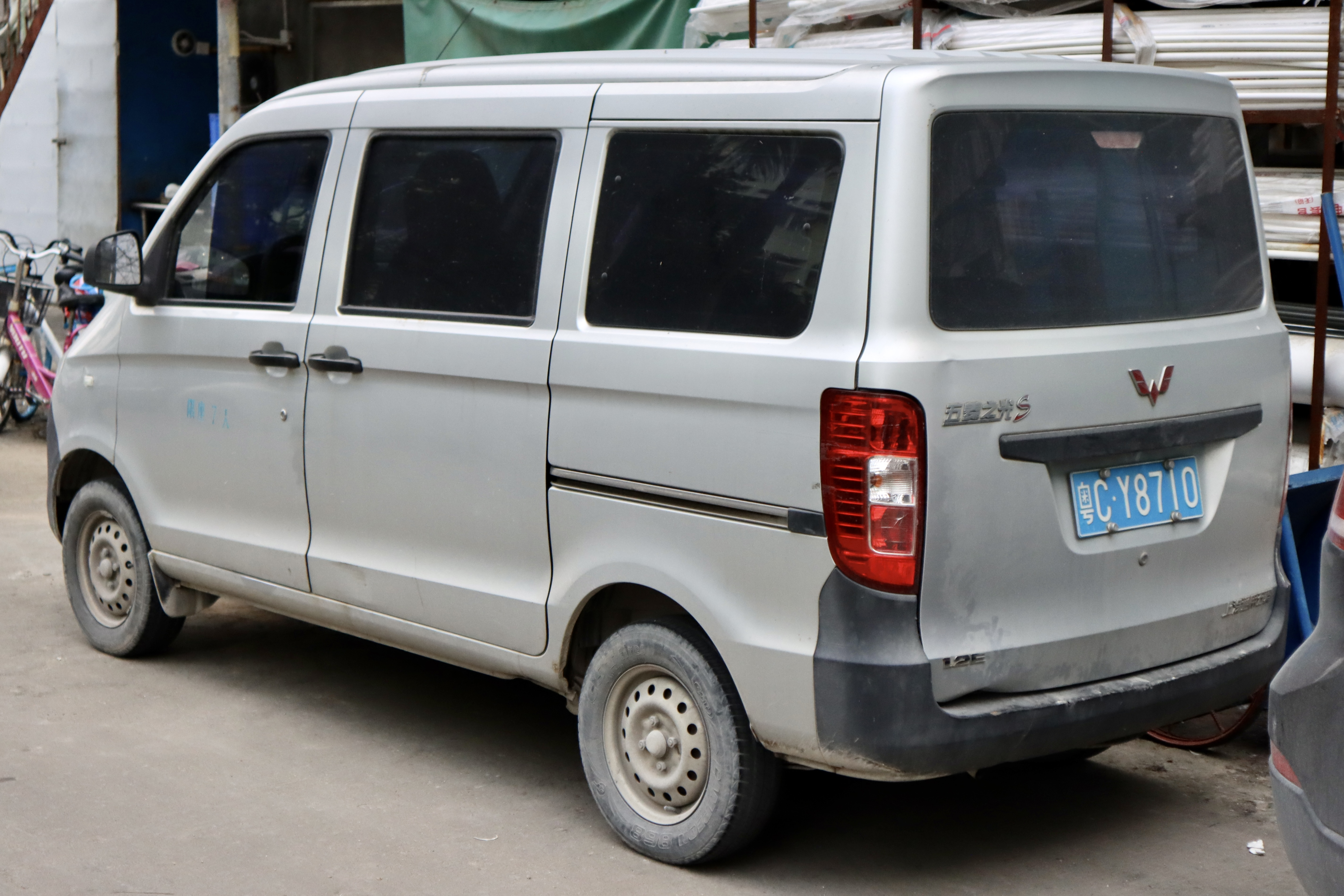
Rear view

Just like of the Wuling Rongguang S, the Wuling Sunshine S is a redesigned version of the base Wuling Sunshine. Exterior differentiation is obvious. Technical upgrades from the regular Sunshine include the addition of ABS and EBD. It was discontinued in 2020, as it was not fitted with an engine complying with China 6b emissions standards.

=== Powertrain ===
The Wuling Sunshine S is powered by a 1.2-liter engine developing 82 hp (61 kW) and 115 N⋅m (85 lb⋅ft) mated to a 5-speed manual transmission.

== Wuling Sunshine V ==
Despite being under the same series, the "V" version (codename: CN050V) in Wuling's naming system instead denotes a body style more in line with a compact MPV. It was introduced in December 2016, its engine is now located under the hood rather than underneath the front seats. It was discontinued in 2020, as sales fell and it was not fitted with an engine complying with China 6b emissions standards.

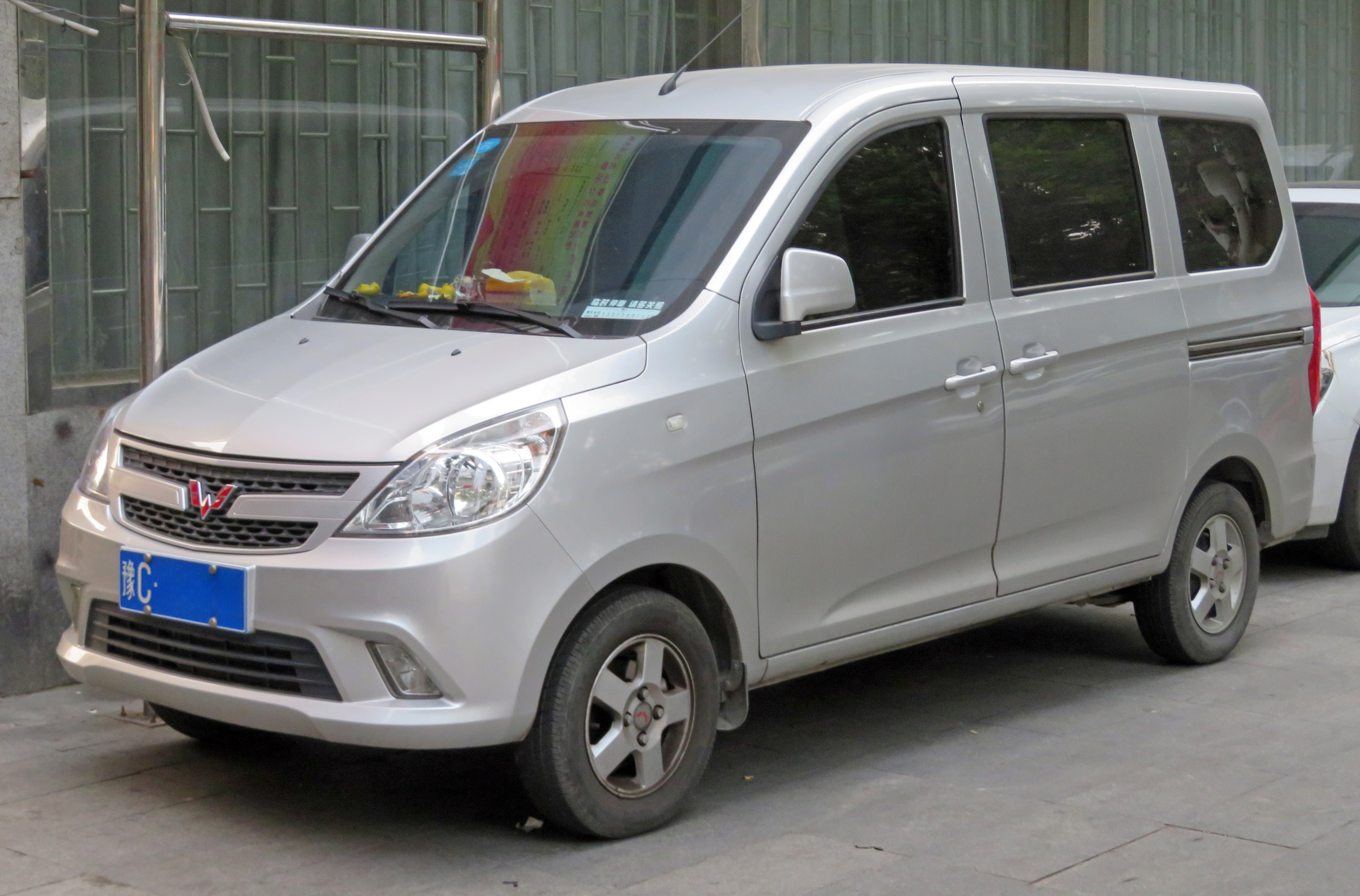
Wuling Sunshine V

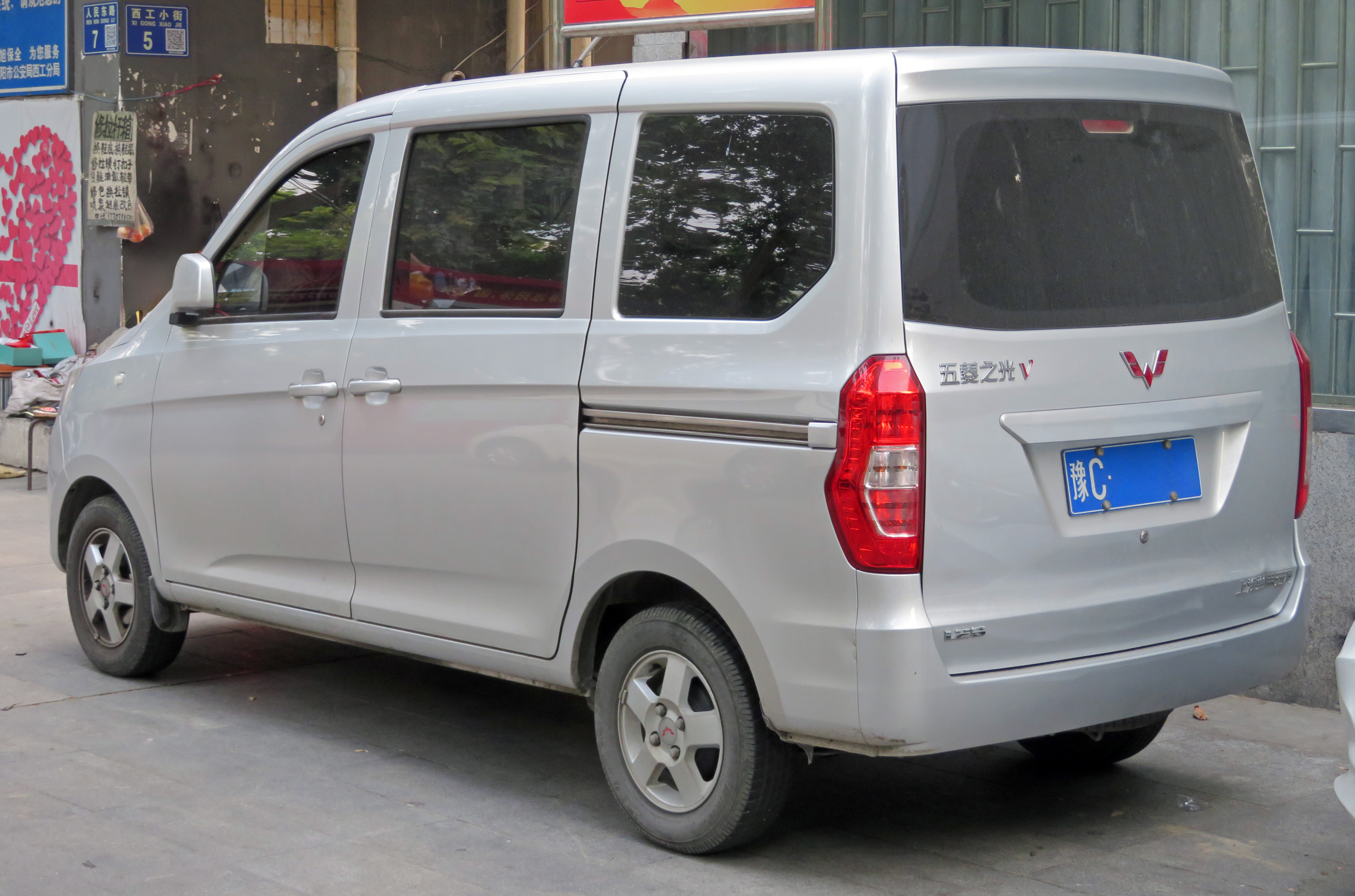
Rear view

== Third generation (2025) ==
Third generation
- Wuling Sunshine EV

Overview
- Model code: CE110M
- Also called: Wuling Zhiguang EV
- Production: 2025–present

Body and chassis
- Layout: Rear-motor, rear-wheel drive

Powertrain
- Electric motor: 30 kW permanent magnet synchronous
- Power output: 40 hp (30 kW; 41 PS)
- Transmission: Single-speed gear reduction
- Battery: 17.7 kWh LFP Gotion; 30.6 kWh LFP Sunwoda
- Electric range: 201–305 km (125–190 mi) (CLTC)

Dimensions
- Wheelbase: 2,600 mm (102.4 in)
- Length: 3,685 mm (145.1 in)
- Width: 1,530 mm (60.2 in)
- Height: 1,750 mm (68.9 in)
- Curb weight: 892–1,010 kg (1,967–2,227 lb)

The third generation of the Sunshine is known as the Wuling Zhiguang EV was introduced in late December 2024 with sales beginning in February 2025. It is fully battery electric and is based on a stretched version of the Hongguang Mini EV's platform, which it shares front and rear track dimensions with. Compared to the previous generation Zhiguang, it has a 100 mm (3.9 in) longer wheelbase while being 125 mm (4.9 in) shorter overall, and it is 20 mm (0.8 in) shorter and 70 mm (2.8 in) wider.

The exterior has a boxy profile similar to a kei car, though it is 50 mm (2.0 in) too wide and 285 mm (11.2 in) too long to qualify. The front features a charging port underneath the Wuling badge, a grille-less design apart from a small lower air intake, and features air curtain vents at the corners. It has rear sliding doors which provide an opening of 20 mm (0.8 in), is equipped with 13-inch wheels, and comes with roof rails. The tailgate opens vertically to 90°, and the 527-litre (18.6 cu ft) rear cargo area has a loading height of 569 mm (22.4 in), and can expand to 1,117-litre (39.4 cu ft) with the rear seats folded.

The interior is very basic and is available in a single four-seater configuration. The dashboard is very simple and includes a 4.2-inch digital instrument cluster, a basic radio, and a three HVAC control dials. It also has a 4-way manually adjustable driver's seat with black upholstery, a rotary shifter and a manual parking brake. It has 20 M6-threaded screw mounting holes throughout the interior for mounting accessories, such as smartphone holders, cupholders and folding tables on the dashboard, and storage compartments and racks in the rear cabin. The rear seats and front passenger seat can be folded flat.

A new trim level called the Progressive edition became available on 23 July 2025, and features a larger battery for of range, a larger 7-inch digital instrument cluster, LED headlights, and a 6-way adjustable manual driver's seat upholstered in Cool Grey.

=== Powertrain ===
The Zhiguang EV is only available with a battery-electric powertrain. It is only available in rear-wheel drive with a 40 hp (30 kW; 41 PS) rear motor, giving it a top speed of 100 km/h (62 mph). It was initially available with a 17.7 kWh LFP battery pack supplied by Gotion providing CLTC range of 201 km (125 mi), with a 30.6 kWh Sunwoda-supplied pack weighing 245 kg (540 lb) providing 305 km (190 mi) of range becoming available later. It is capable of charging from 30–80% in 35 minutes, and can output 3.3 kW in V2L applications.

A version compatible with CATL's Choco-SEB swappable battery pack network is expected in the future, which will use a 42 kWh pack.

Rear view

== Sales ==
Sunshine NEV
Year	China
2024	5
2025	33,860

Sunshine
Year	China
2024	26,672
2025	26,325
