= Van =

Covered transportation vehicle

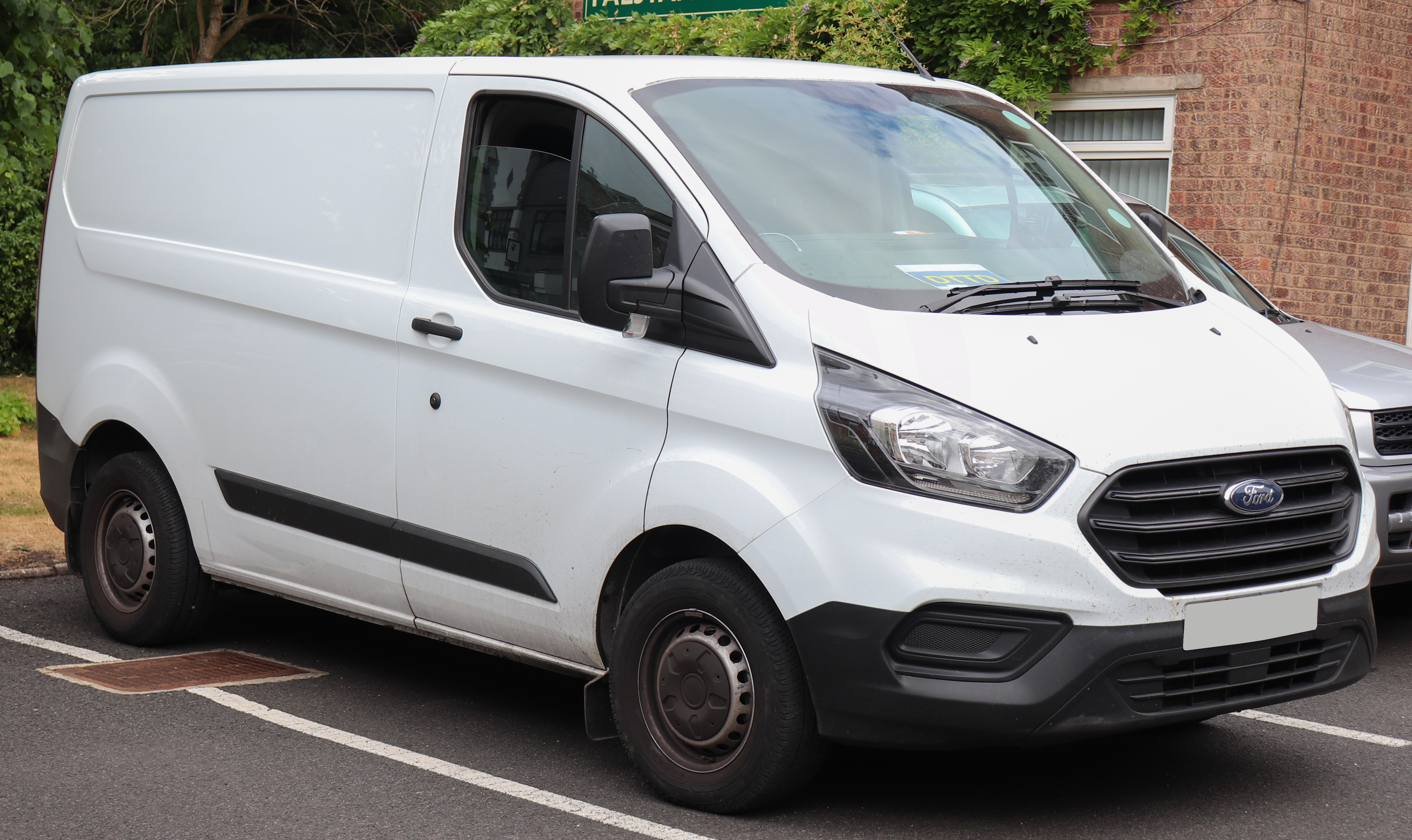
A Ford Transit Custom low roof van

A van is a type of road vehicle used for transporting goods or people. There is some variation in the scope of the word across the different English-speaking countries. The smallest vans, microvans, are used for transporting either goods or people in tiny quantities. Multi-purpose vehicles (MPVs), Mini MPVs and compact MPVs are all small vans usually used for transporting people in small quantities. Larger vans with passenger seats are used for institutional purposes, such as transporting students. Panel vans are based on passenger car platforms but are primarily used for cargo. Larger vans with only front seats are often used for business purposes, to carry goods and equipment. Specially equipped vans are used by television stations as mobile studios. Postal services and courier companies use large step vans to deliver packages.

== Word origin and usage ==
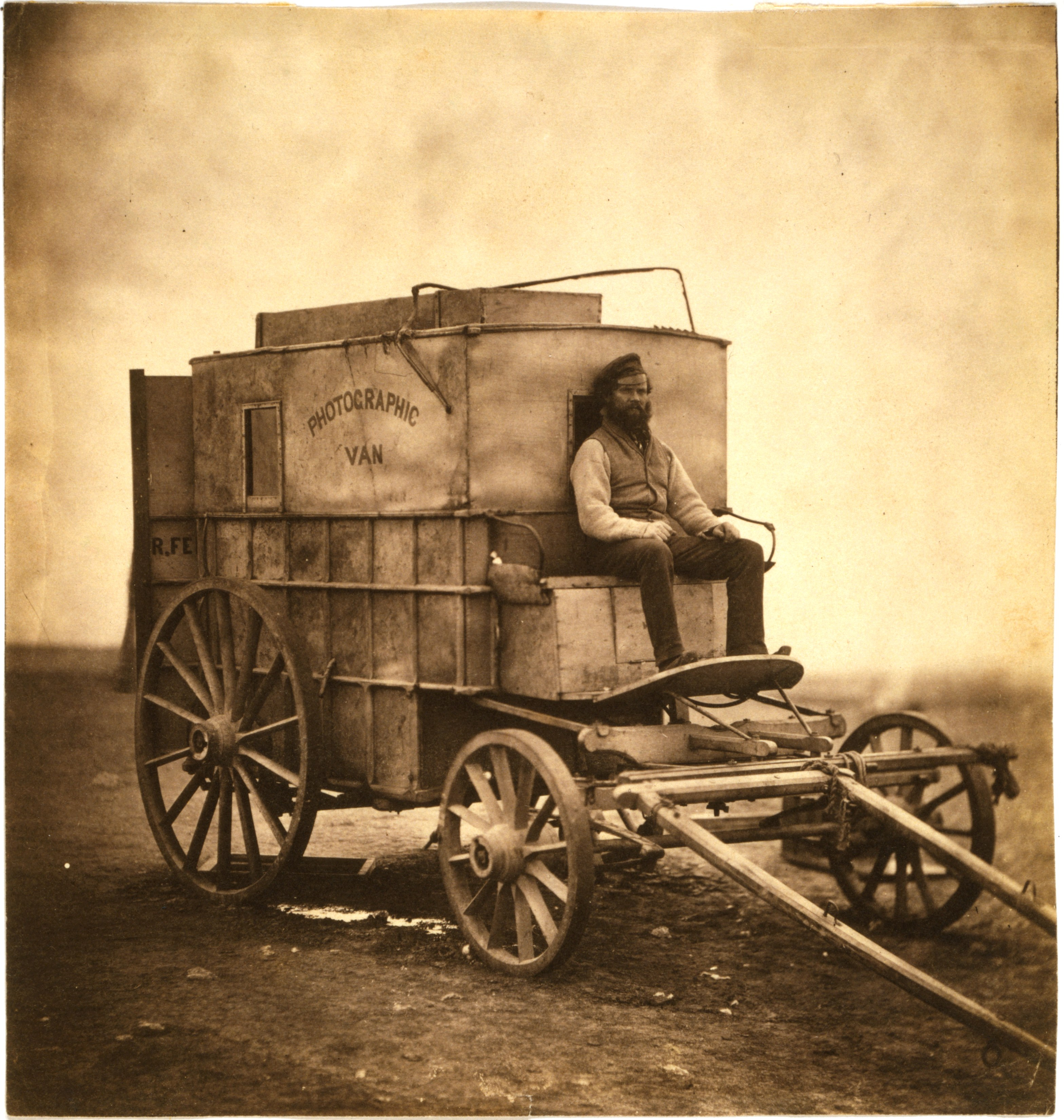
Roger Fenton's photographic van, Crimea, 1855

Van meaning a type of vehicle arose as a contraction of the word caravan. The earliest records of a van as a vehicle in English are in the mid-19th century, meaning a covered wagon for transporting goods; the earliest reported record of such was in 1829. The word caravan with the same meaning has been used since the 1670s. A caravan, meaning one wagon, had arisen as an extension, or corruption, of a caravan meaning a convoy of multiple wagons.

The word van has slightly different, but overlapping, meanings in different forms of English. While the word now applies everywhere to boxy cargo vans, other applications are found to a greater or lesser extent in different English-speaking countries; some examples follow:

=== Australia ===
In Australian English, the term van is commonly used to describe a minivan, a passenger minibus, or an Australian panel van as manufactured by companies such as Holden and Ford at various times.

A full-size van used for commercial purposes is also known as a "van" in Australia; however, a passenger vehicle with more than seven or eight seats is more likely to be called a "minibus".

The term van can also sometimes be used interchangeably with what Australians usually call a "caravan", which in the U.S. is referred to as a "travel trailer".

The British term people mover is also used in Australian English to describe a passenger van. The American usage of "van" which describes a cargo box trailer or semi-trailer is used rarely, if ever, in Australia.

=== India ===
In India, the van is one of the most common modes of transportation and is often used for taking children to and from schools, usually when parents, especially working parents, are too busy to pick their children up from school or when school buses are full and unable to accommodate additional children. Vans are also used for commercial purposes and office cabs. Some of the popular vans include Maruti Suzuki Omni and the Maruti Suzuki Eeco.

=== Japan ===
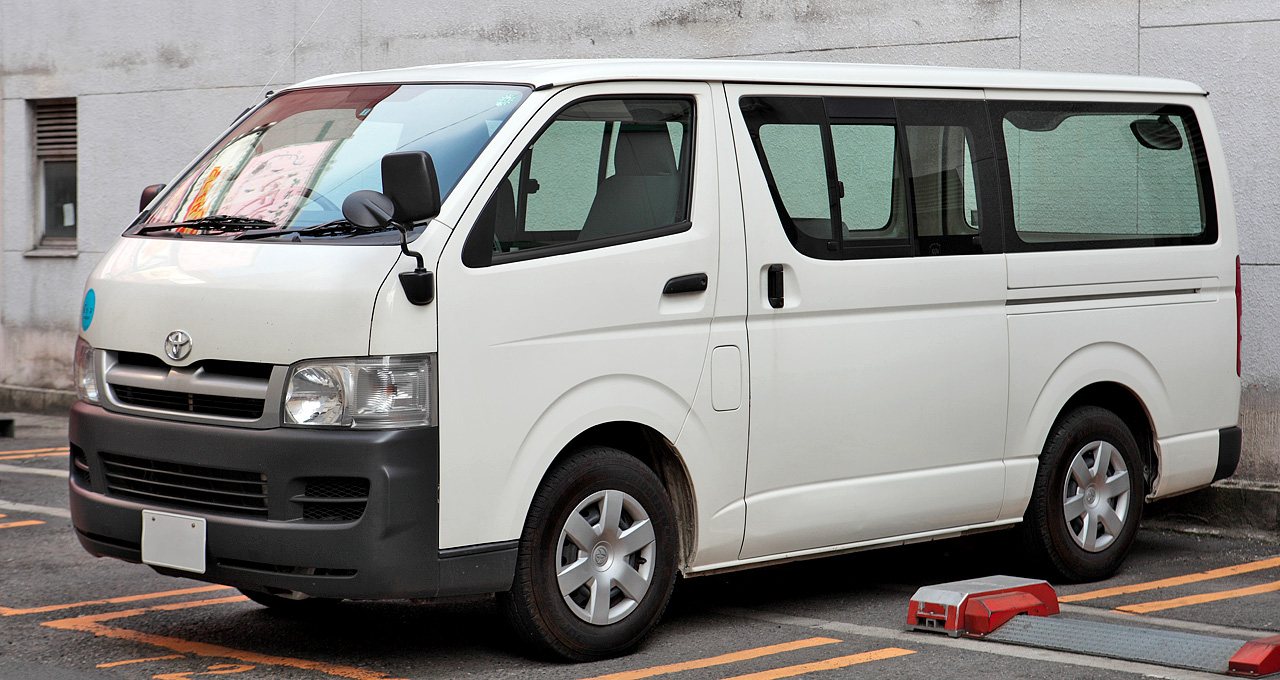
Toyota HiAce cab over van

Early Japanese vans include the Kurogane Baby, Mazda Bongo, and the Toyota LiteAce. Japanese manufacturers also produced many vans based on the American flat nose design, but also minivans which for the American market have generally evolved to the long-wheelbase front-wheel drive form. The Nissan Prairie and Mitsubishi Chariot as well as microvans that fulfill kei car regulations, are popular for small businesses. The term is also used to describe full-fledged station wagons (passenger car front sheet metal, flat-folding back seats, windows all around) and even hatchbacks with basic trim packages intended for commercial use. These are referred to as "light vans" (Japanese: ライトバン), with "light" referring to the glazing rather than the weight of the vehicle.

=== United Kingdom ===
In British English, the word van refers to vehicles that carry goods only, either on roads or on rails. What would be called a "minivan" in American English is called a "people-carrier", "MPV" or multi-purpose vehicle, and larger passenger vehicles are called "minibuses". The Telegraph newspaper introduced the idea of the "White Van Man", a typical working-class man or small business owner who would have a white Ford Transit, Mercedes-Benz Sprinter, or similar panel van. Today the phrase "man and van" or "man with a van" refers to light removal firms normally operated by a sole business owner transporting anything from the contents of a whole house to just a few boxes. The word "van" also refers to railway covered goods wagons, called "boxcars" in the United States.

=== United States ===
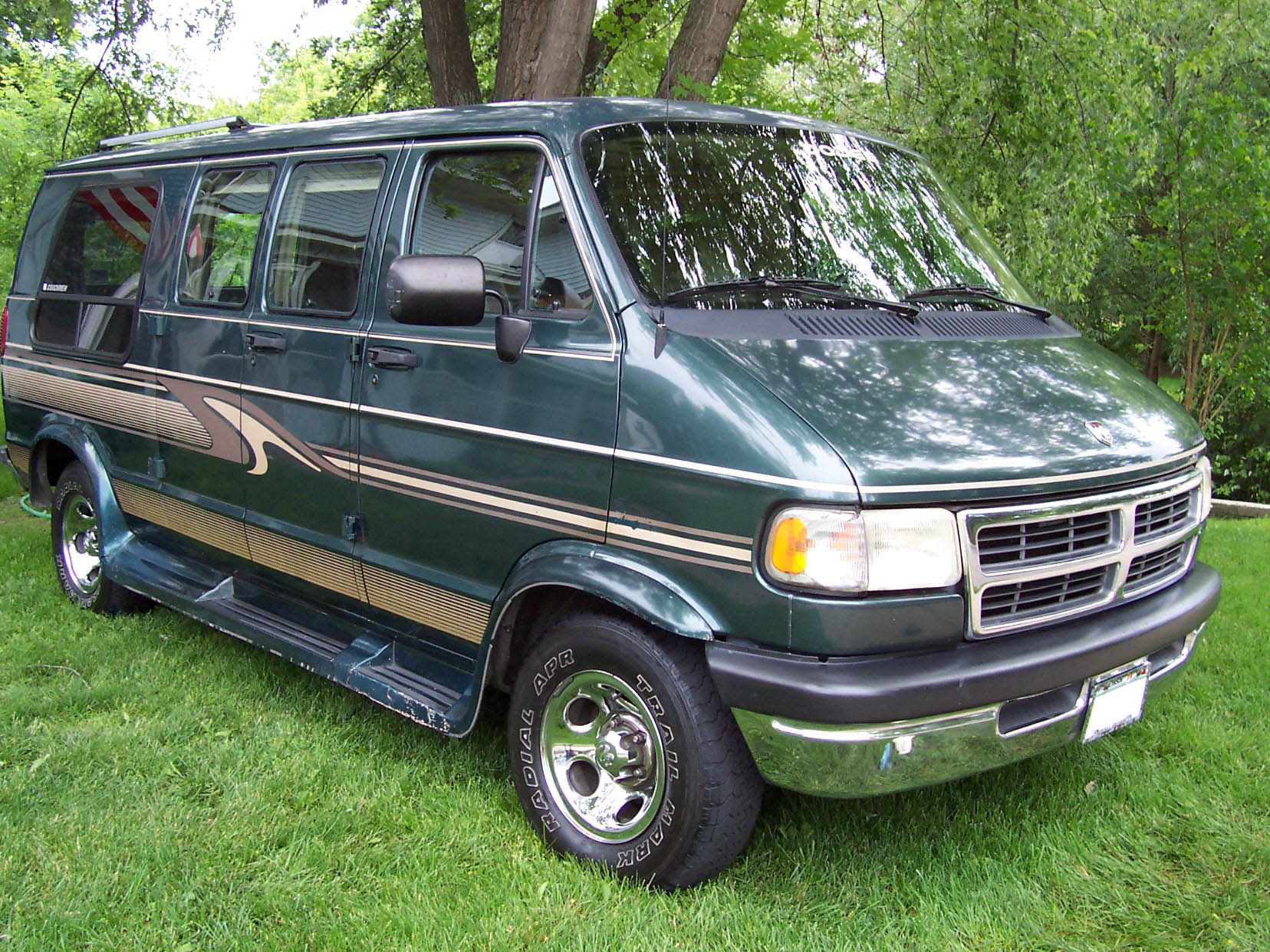
Full-size Dodge Ram van in the United States

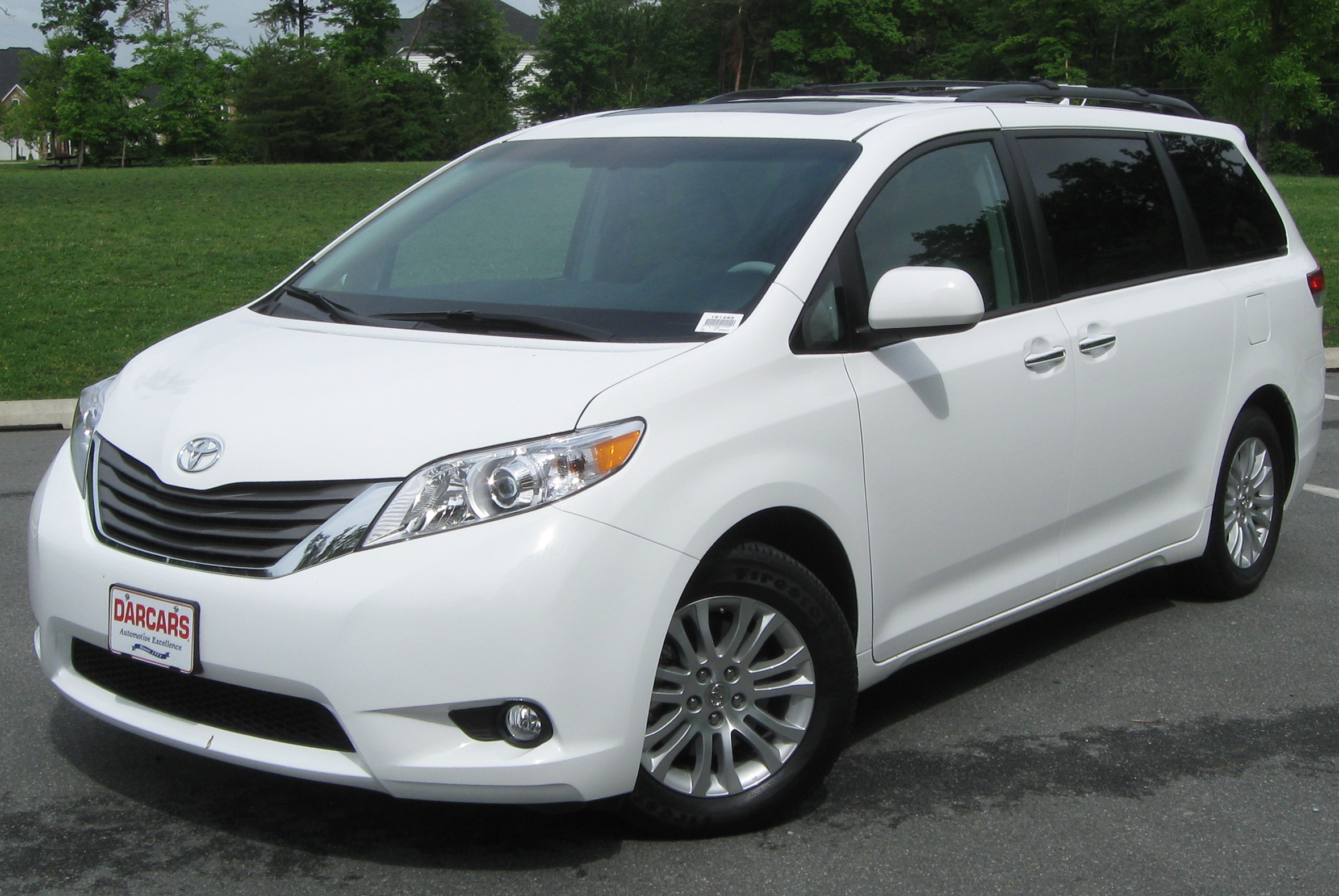
Toyota Sienna minivan in the United States

In the United States, a van can also refer to a box-shaped trailer or semi-trailer used to carry goods. In this case, there is a differentiation between a "dry van", used to carry most goods, and a refrigerated van, or "reefer", used for cold goods. A railway car used to carry baggage is also called a "van".

A vehicle referred to in the US as a "full-size van" is usually a large, boxy vehicle that has a platform and powertrain similar to their light truck counterparts. These vans may be sold with the space behind the front seats empty for transporting goods (cargo van), furnished for passenger use by either the manufacturer (wagon), or another company for more personal comforts (conversion van). Full-size vans often have short hoods, with the engine placed under the passenger cabin.

A cutaway van chassis is a variation of the full-size van that was developed for use by second stage manufacturers. Such a unit has a van front end and driver controls in a cab body that extends to a point behind the front seats, where the rest of the van body is cut off (leading to the terminology "cutaway"). From that point aft, only the chassis frame rails and running gear extend to the rear when the unit is shipped as an "incomplete vehicle". A second-stage manufacturer, commonly known as a bodybuilder, will complete the vehicle for uses such as recreational vehicles, small school buses, minibusses, type III ambulances, and delivery trucks. A large proportion of cutaway van chassis are equipped with dual rear wheels. Second-stage manufacturers sometimes add third weight-bearing single wheel "tag axles" for their larger minibus models.

The term van in the US may also refer to a minivan. Minivans are usually distinguished by their smaller size and front wheel drive powertrain, although some are equipped with four-wheel drive. Minivans typically offer seven- or eight-passenger seating capacity, and better fuel economy than full-sized vans, at the expense of power, cargo space, and towing capacity. Minivans are often equipped with sliding doors.

== History ==
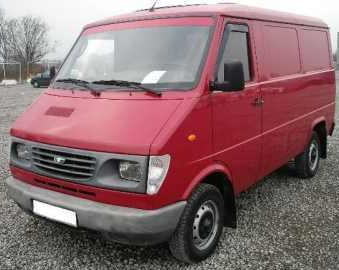
Polish Lublin III van

The precursor to American vans would be the sedan deliveries of the 1930s to late-1950s. The first generation of American vans were the 1960s compact vans, which were patterned in size after the Volkswagen Bus. The Corvair-based entry even imitated the rear-mounted, air-cooled engine design. The Ford Falcon-based first-generation Econoline had a flat nose, with the engine mounted between and behind the front seats. The Dodge A100 had a similar layout and could accommodate a V8 engine. Chevrolet also switched to this layout. The Ford, Dodge, and Corvair vans were also produced as pickup trucks.

The standard or full size vans appeared with Ford's innovation of moving the engine forward under a short hood and using pickup truck components. The engine cockpit housing is often called a dog house. Over time, they evolved longer noses and sleeker shapes. The Dodge Sportsman was available with an extension to the rear of its long-wheelbase model to create a 15-passenger van. Vehicles have been sold as both cargo and passenger models, as well as in cutaway van chassis versions for second stage manufacturers to make box vans, ambulances, campers, and other vehicles. Second-stage manufacturers also modify the original manufacturer's body to create custom vans.

== Use ==
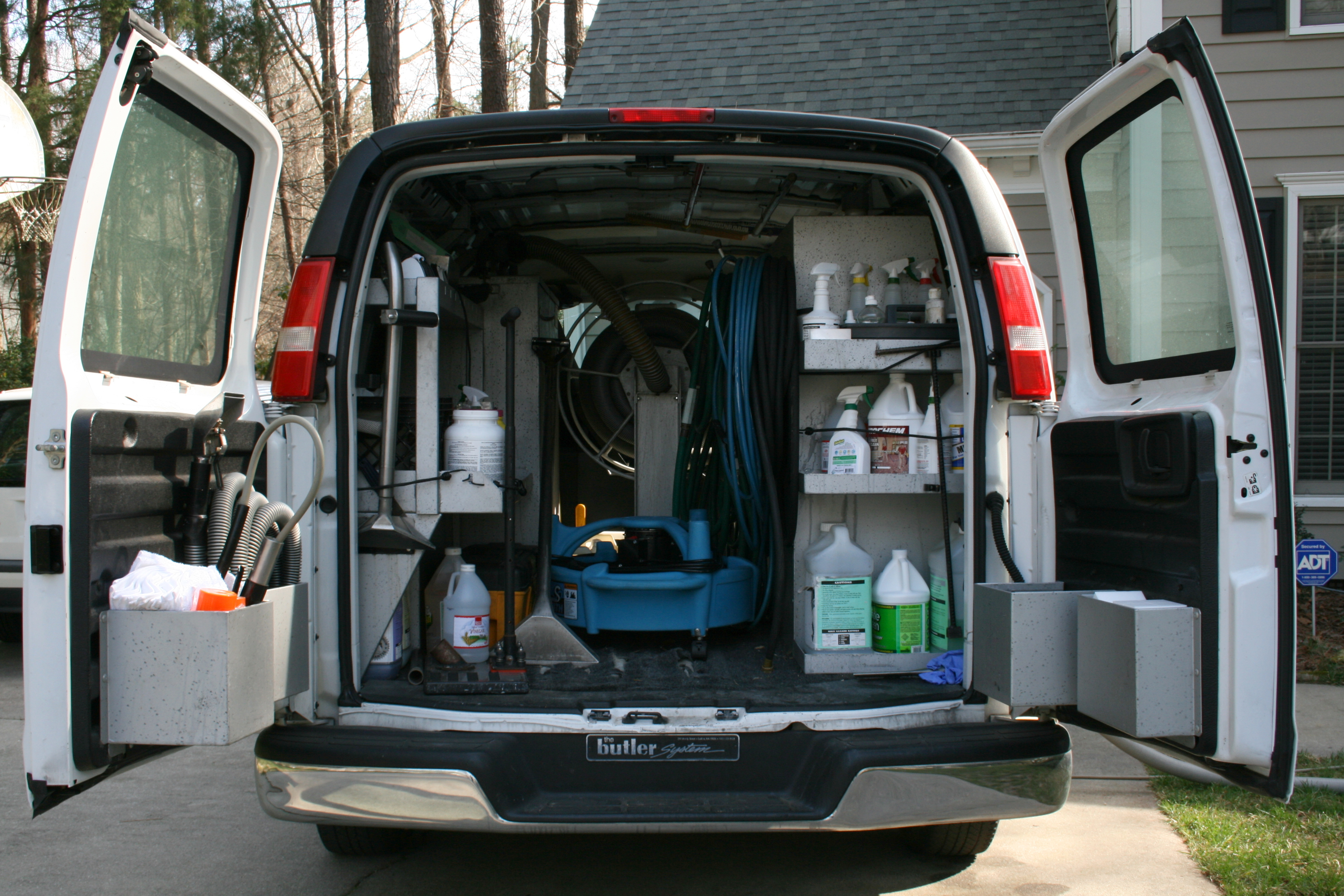
A Chevrolet van equipped with professional carpet cleaning tools

In urban areas of the United States, full-size vans have been used as commuter vans since 1971, when Dodge introduced a van that could transport up to 15 passengers. Commuter vans are used as an alternative to carpooling and other ride-sharing arrangements.

Many mobile businesses use a van to carry almost their entire business to various places where they work. For example, those who come to homes or places of business to perform various services, installations, or repairs. Vans are also used to shuttle people and their luggage between hotels and airports, to transport commuters between parking lots and their places of work, and along established routes as minibusses. Vans are also used to transport elderly and mobility-impaired worshipers to and from church services or to transport youth groups for outings to amusement parks, picnics, and visiting other churches. Vans are also used by schools to drive sports teams to intramural games. Vans have been used by touring music groups to haul equipment and people to music venues around the country.

=== Full-size van ===
Full-size van is a marketing term used in North America for a van larger than a minivan, that is characterized by a large, boxy appearance, a short hood, and heavy cargo and passenger-hauling capability.

The first full-size van was the 1969 Ford Econoline, which used components from the Ford F-Series pickups. General Motors and the Dodge Ram Van followed with designs with the engines placed further forward, and succeeding generations of the Econoline introduced longer hoods.

=== Step van ===
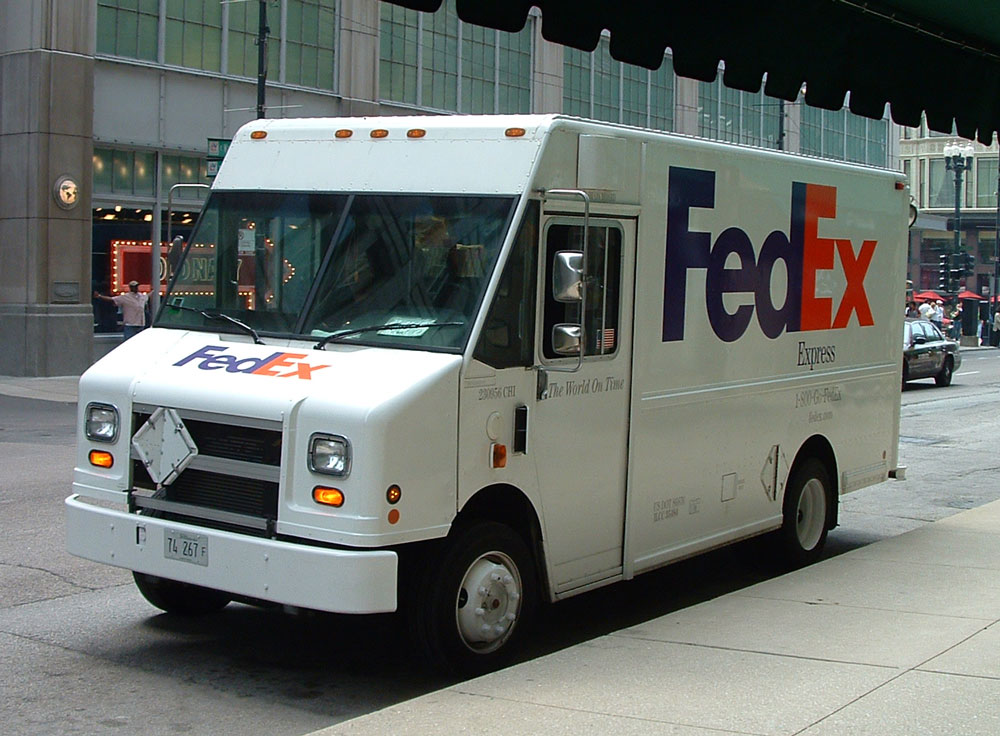
A FedEx step van

Another type of van specific to North America is the step van, named because of the design to facilitate users to step in and out of the vehicle. Widely used by delivery services, courier companies, and the parcel division of the United States Postal Service and Canada Post, they are often seen driven with the door open. Step vans have more boxy shapes, wider bodies, and higher rooftops than other vans, and are rarely employed for carrying passengers.

=== Minivan ===
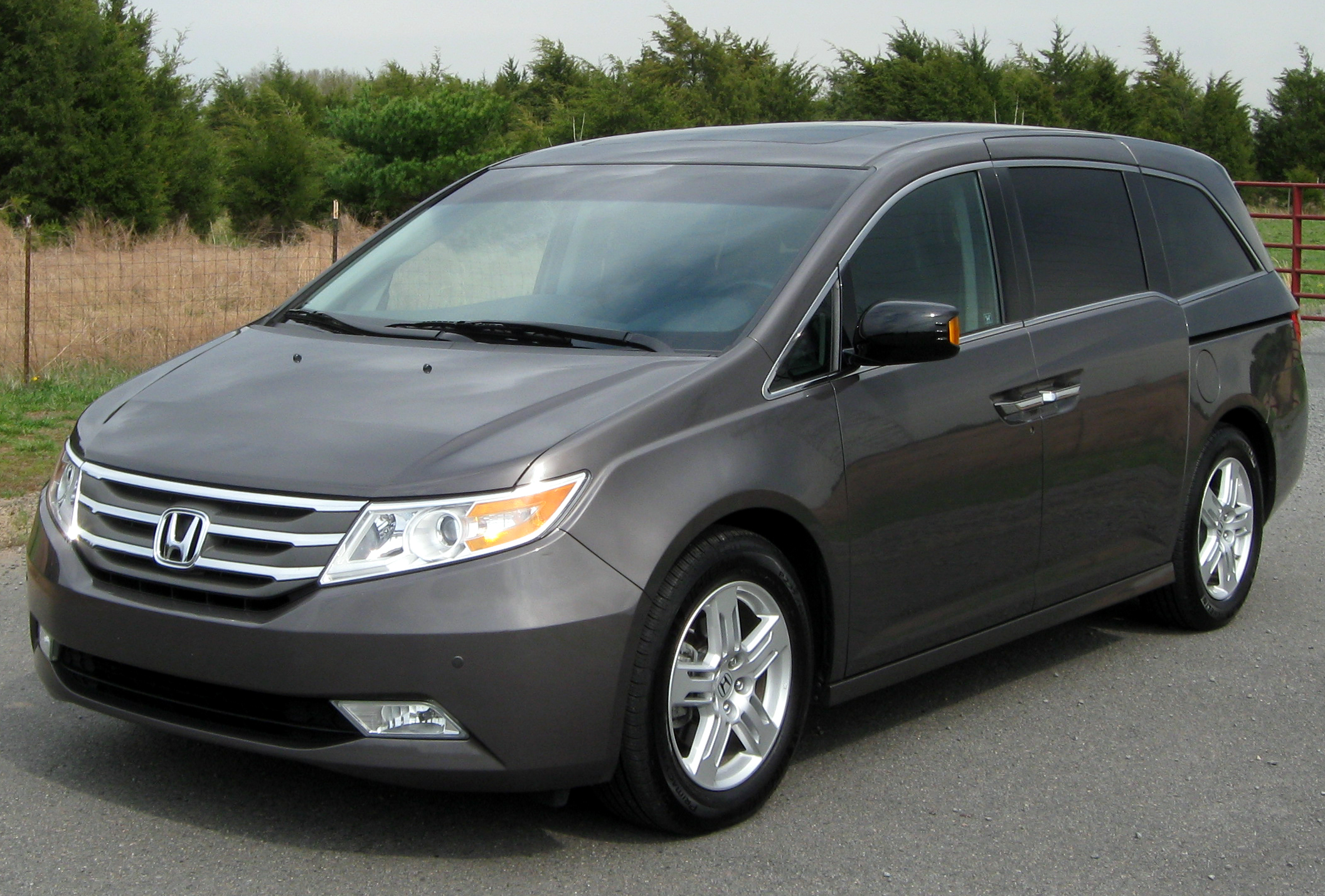
A 2011 Honda Odyssey minivan. Compared to other vans, minivans are smaller and have a lower center of gravity.

The minivan is a van which is smaller in size in length and height than a full-size van. Minivans are often used for personal use, as well as commercial passenger operations such as taxis and shuttles, and cargo operations like delivery of mail and packages. They offer more cargo space than traditional sedans and SUVs. Their lower center of gravity is also useful in handling and rollover prevention.

=== Rollover safety ===
A van is taller than a typical passenger car, resulting in a higher center of gravity. The suspension is also higher to accommodate the weight of 15 passengers, who can weigh over one ton alone. In the United States, it is common for only the front seat passengers to use their safety belts. The U.S. National Highway Traffic Safety Administration (NHTSA) has determined that belted passengers are about four times more likely to survive in rollover crashes.

Safety can be improved by understanding the unique characteristics of 12- and 15-passenger vans and by following guidelines developed for their drivers, according to the U.S. National Highway Traffic Safety Administration (NHTSA).

=== Safety equipment ===
Many commercial vans are fitted with cargo barriers behind the front seats (or rear seats, if fitted) to prevent injuries caused by unsecured cargo in the event of sudden deceleration, collision, or a rollover. Cargo barriers in vans are sometimes fitted with doors permitting the driver to pass through to the cargo compartment of the vehicle.

== See also ==
- Box truck
- Campervan
- Ice cream van
- Kebab van
- List of vans
- Public light bus
- Refrigerator truck
- Sedan delivery
