= Wuling Hongtu =

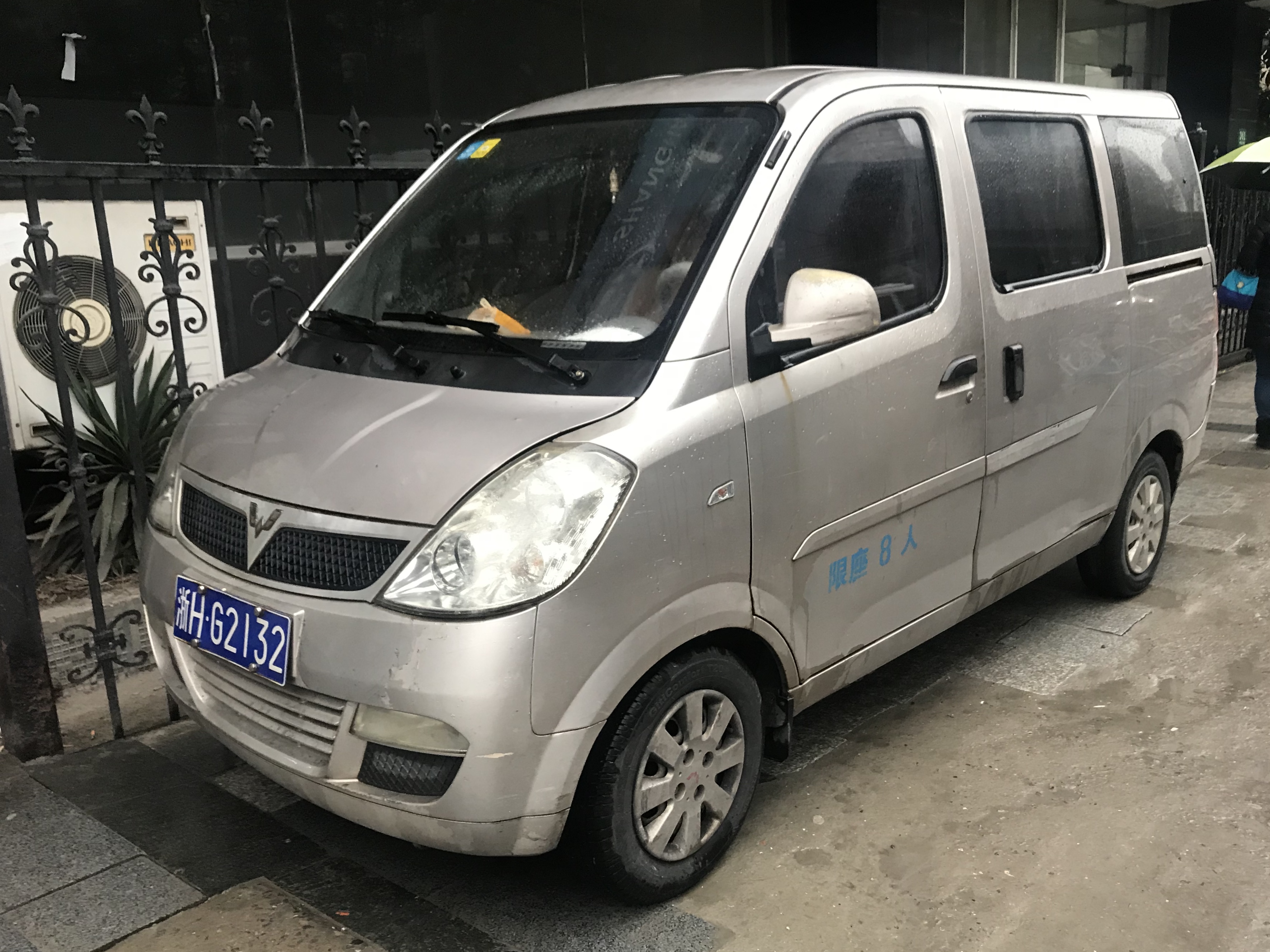

Overview
- Manufacturer: SAIC-GM-Wuling
- Also called: Wuling LZW 6381; Wuling Journey; Wuling Sunshine (Singapore); Wuling N200; Chevrolet N200
- Production: 2007–2012
- Designer: James C. Shyr (2010; exterior; 2011; interior)

Body and chassis
- Class: Microvan
- Body style: 5-door, 5- to 8-seater minivan
- Layout: Front-engine, front-wheel drive

Powertrain
- Engine: 1.1 L LXA I4; 1.2 L LAQ I4
- Transmission: 5 speed manual

Dimensions
- Wheelbase: 2,500 mm (98.4 in)
- Length: 3,860 mm (152.0 in)
- Width: 1,570 mm (61.8 in)
- Height: 1,860 mm (73.2 in)

Chronology
- Predecessor: Chevrolet Combo

The Wuling Hongtu is a five-door, five- to eight-seater microvan made by SGMW (SAIC-GM-Wuling Automobile), a Chinese joint venture of SAIC with Liuzhou Wuling Motors Co and the American automotive company General Motors. Unlike the company's earlier Mitsubishi-based products, the Hongtu is an independent development. Codenamed LZW 6381B3, the cargo version of the Hongtu is also marketed as the Wuling Journey and Sunshine in Singapore and Chevrolet N200 (Latin America, North Africa, Middle East).

== Specifications ==
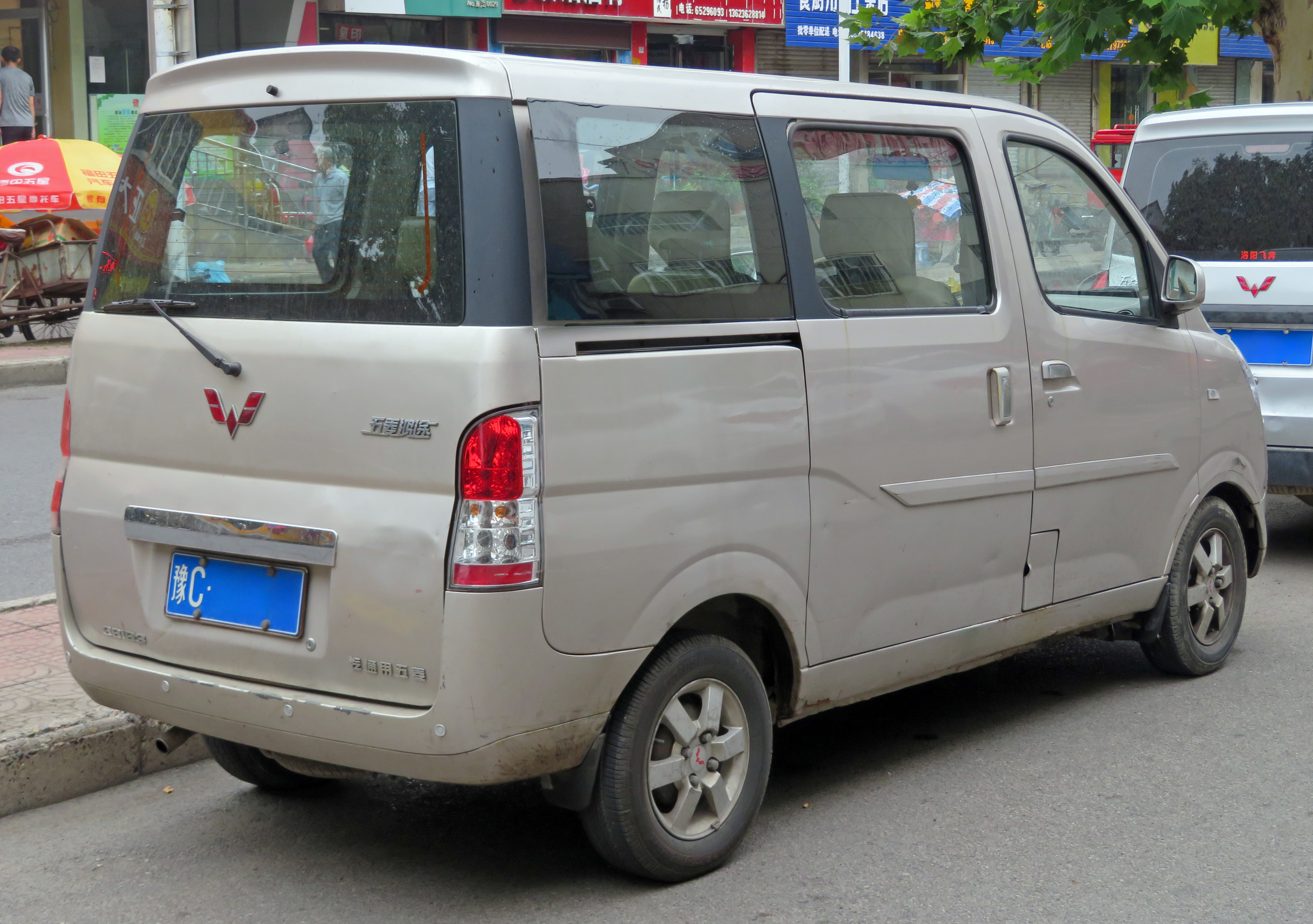
Rear view of the Wuling Hongtu

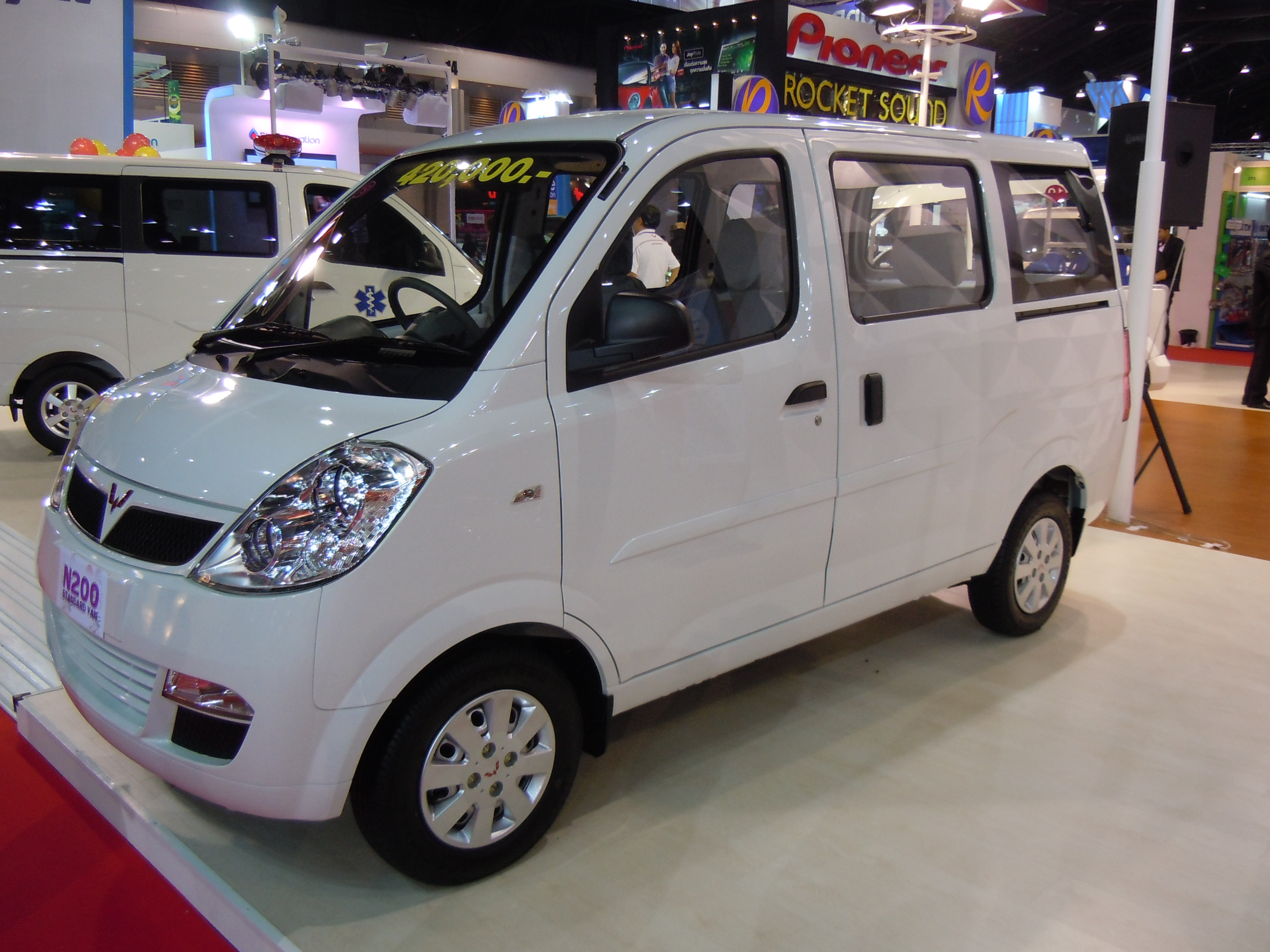
Wuling N200

The LZW 6381B3 Hongtu is equipped with Wuling's own B-series four cylinder engine of 1.2 litre displacement (engine code LAQ). Its 86 PS (63 kW) at 6,000 rpm is enough to propel the 1,095 kg (2,414 lb) car to 135 km/h (84 mph). The Singaporean market Sunshine and Journey receive the modelcode LZW 6381C3, the one-letter difference denoting its being equipped with the older 1.1-litre LJ465Q3-1 engine, which is based on the thirty-year-old Suzuki F10A. With only 53 PS (39 kW) on tap, the Sunshine/Journey's top speed is barely over 105 km/h (65 mph).

Suspension is independent by MacPherson struts in front, with either leaf springs or coil springs in rear depending on the equipment level. Brakes are discs up front and drums in the rear, and only a five-speed manual transmission is available. Safety features such as airbags and ABS brakes are available at extra cost.

Sales in Latin America began in July 2008, as the car entered the Peruvian market under the name of Chevrolet N200. The N200 receives another grille and prominent Chevrolet badges. Since August 2009, the Chevrolet N200 is sold through GM's distribution network in markets in Latin America, Africa, and Arab countries.
