= Wuling Starlight 560 =

Compact crossover SUV

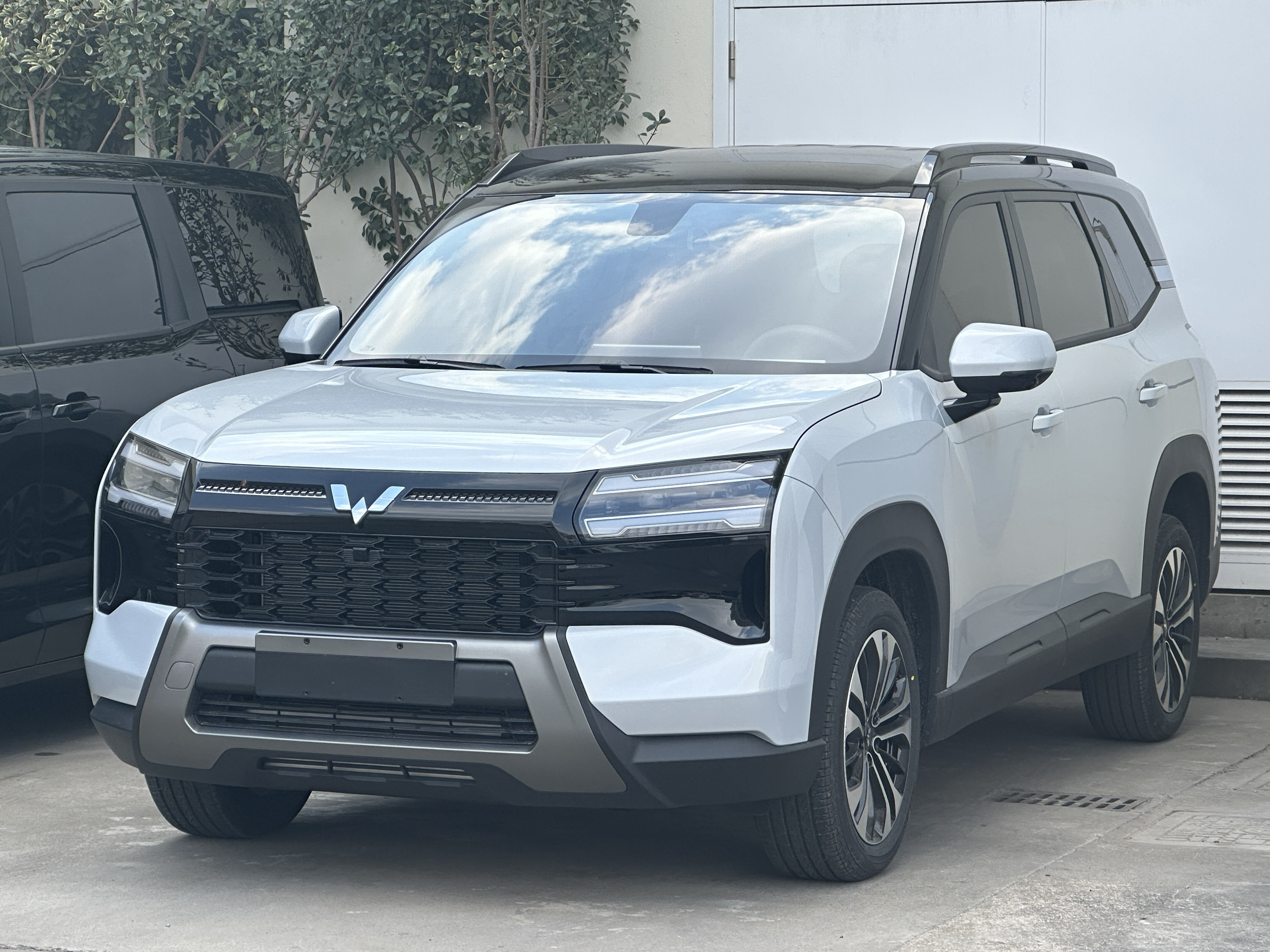
- Wuling Starlight 560 (ICE)

Overview
- Manufacturer: SAIC-GM-Wuling
- Model code: F520S
- Also called: Wuling Xingguang 560; Wuling Eksion (Indonesia, Moldova); MG Hector Tomahawk (India)
- Production: December 2025 – present (China); April 2026 – present (Indonesia); August 2026 – present (India)
- Assembly: China: Liuzhou, Guangxi; Indonesia: Cikarang, West Java (SGMW Motor Indonesia); India: Halol, Gujarat (JSW MG Motor India)

Body and chassis
- Class: Compact crossover SUV (D)
- Body style: 5-door SUV
- Layout: Front-engine, front-wheel-drive; Front-motor, front-wheel-drive (EV); Front-engine, front-motor, front-wheel drive (PHEV)
- Platform: Tianyu D Architecture; MG Adapt (India)
- Related: Wuling Starlight 730; Wuling Starlight S; Wuling Starlight; Baojun Yunhai; Baojun Xiangjing

Powertrain
- Engine: Petrol: 1.5 L LC4 I4 turbo; Petrol plug-in hybrid: 1.5 L LBG I4
- Electric motor: Permanent magnet synchronous
- Power output: 130 kW (174 hp; 177 PS); 100 kW (134 hp; 136 PS) (EV); 150 kW (201 hp; 204 PS) (EV); 78 kW (105 hp; 106 PS) (PHEV, engine)
- Transmission: e-CVT / Multi-mode DHT
- Hybrid drivetrain: Plug-in hybrid
- Battery: 60 kWh LFP (EV); 69.2 kWh MAGIC Battery Pro LFP (EV); 9.5 or 20.5 kWh MAGIC Battery Pro LFP (PHEV)
- Range: 500–540 km (311–336 mi) (EV, CLTC); 125 km (78 mi) (PHEV, CLTC)

Dimensions
- Wheelbase: 2,810 mm (110.6 in)
- Length: 4,745 mm (186.8 in)
- Width: 1,850 mm (72.8 in)
- Height: 1,770 mm (69.7 in)
- Curb weight: 1,610–1,818 mm (63.4–71.6 in)

Chronology
- Predecessor: Baojun 530; Wuling Almaz (Indonesia)

The Wuling Starlight 560 (Chinese: 五菱星光560; pinyin: Wǔlíng Xingguang 560) is a compact crossover SUV manufactured by SAIC-GM-Wuling (SGMW) since 2025 under the Wuling brand. It is available with three powertrain options: petrol engine, plug-in hybrid and battery electric.

== Overview ==
The Starlight 560 was introduced during the 2025 ASEAN International Auto Show on 11 December 2025. Available as a 5 and 7-seater, the Starlight 560 is also available as a petrol version powered by a turbocharged engine delivering a maximum power output of 350kW, a plug-in hybrid variant combining 12L motor system while generating a 78 kW maximum power output, and a fully electric variant featuring an electric motor producing up to 96.4kW with a CLTC pure electric range of 450 to 500 kilometers.

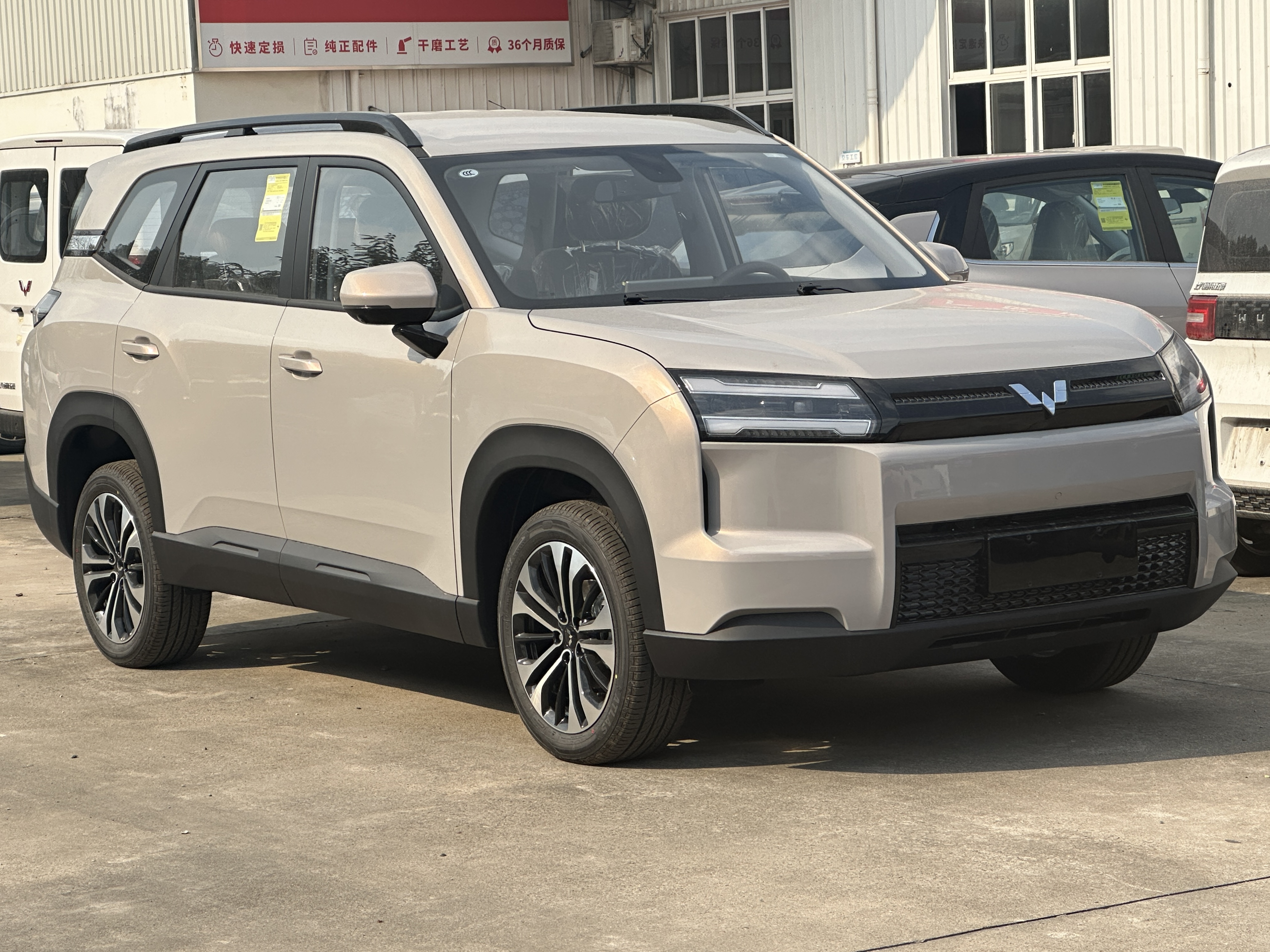
Wuling Starlight 560 (EV)

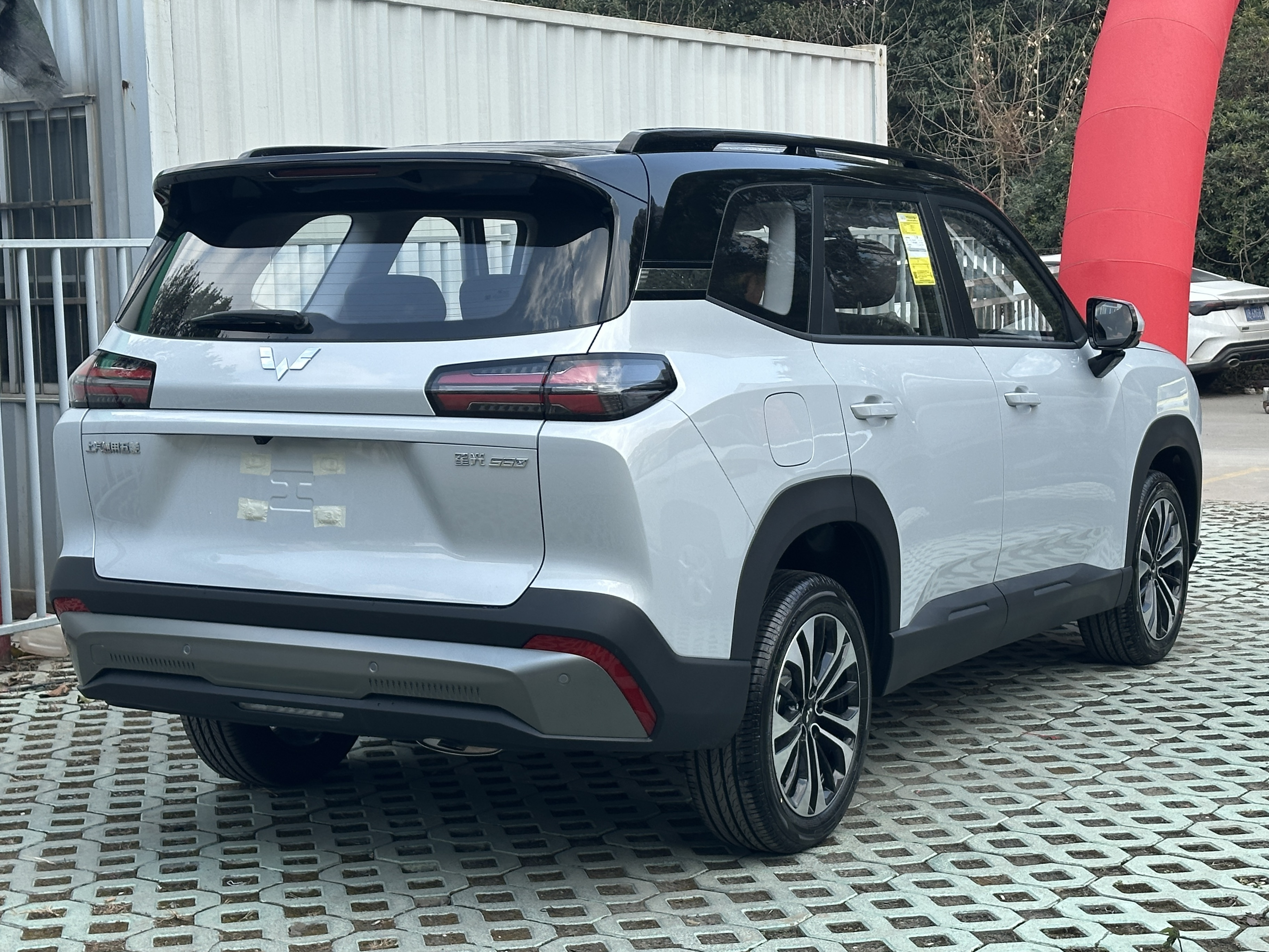
Rear view (ICE)

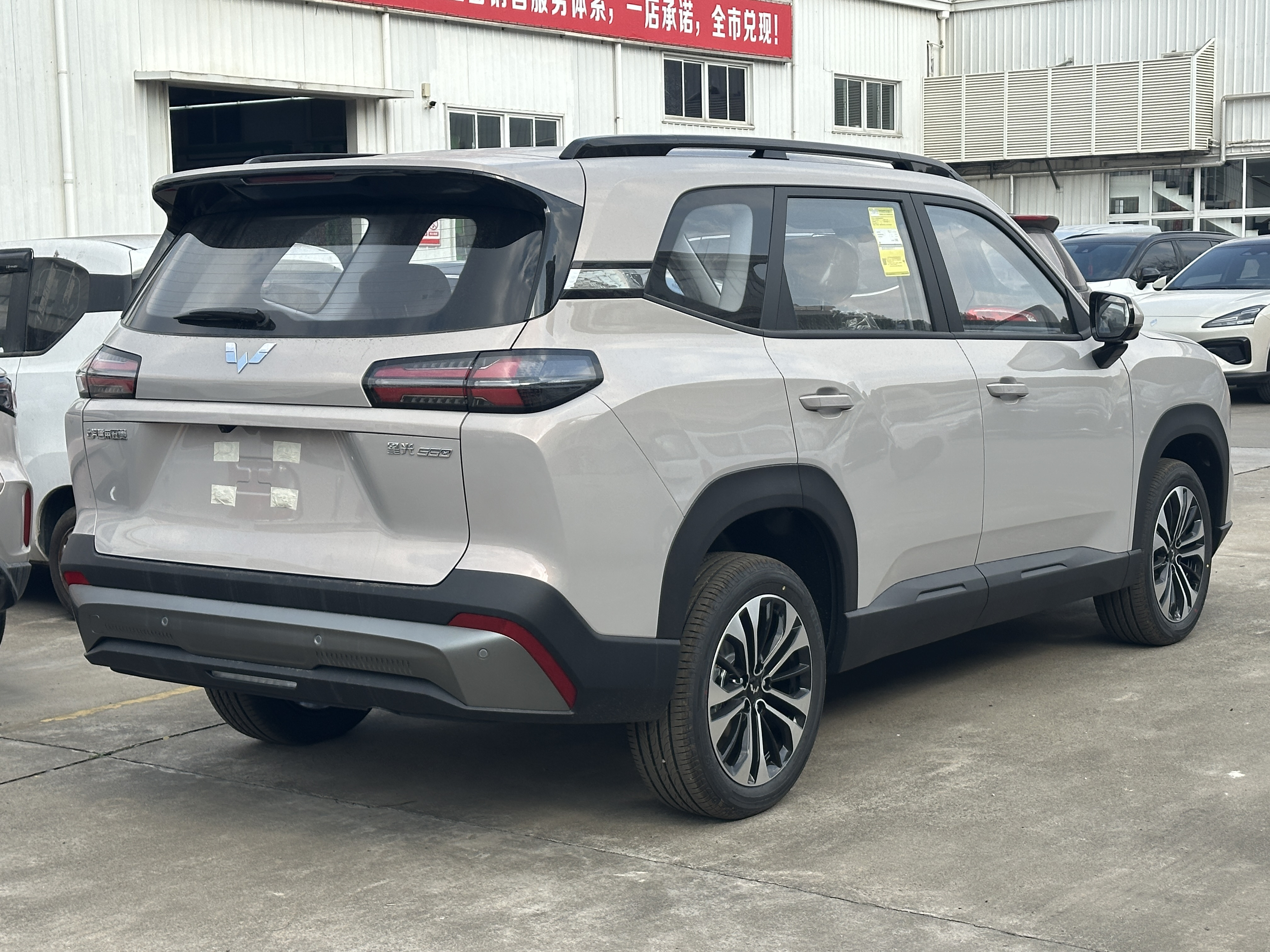
Rear view (EV)

== Overseas markets ==
=== Wuling Eksion ===
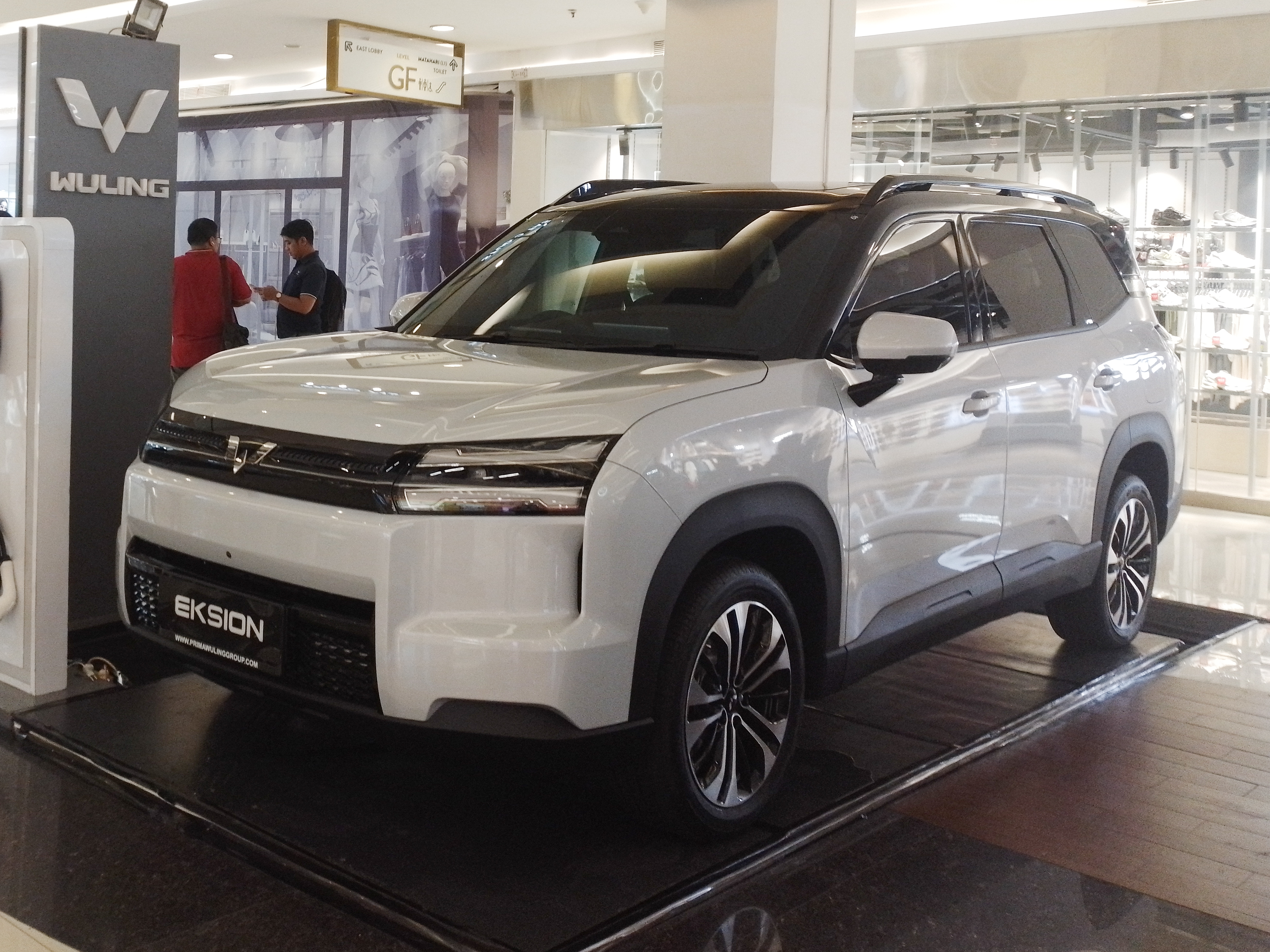
2026 Wuling Eksion EV (Indonesia)

The Starlight 560 was unveiled in Indonesia during the 2026 IIMS as the Wuling Eksion on 5 February 2026. The Eksion was later launched on 22 April 2026, with two grades: CE and EX. Both grades are available with EV and PHEV powertrain options.

The Eksion was launched in Thailand on 2 October 2026. Fully imported from Indonesia, it is available in Comfort and Premium trims, both trims only use the battery electric powertrain.

=== MG Hector Tomahawk ===
The MG will sell a rebadged variant of the Starlight 560 in India known as MG Hector Tomahawk with plug-in hybrid and battery electric powertrains. It was unveiled on 26 August 2026.

In August 2026, JSW MG Motor India launched the Hector Tomahawk in EV and PHEV variants built on its ADAPT platform, offering up to 517 km of pure-electric range for the EV with 69.2 kWh battery and over 1,100 km of combined range for the PHEV with 1.5-litre naturally aspirated petrol engine combined with a 20.5kWh battery.

== Sales ==
Year	China		
Year	EV	PHEV	Total
2025	69	669	738
