= JSW MG Motor India =

Automotive company

JSW MG Motor India Pvt Ltd
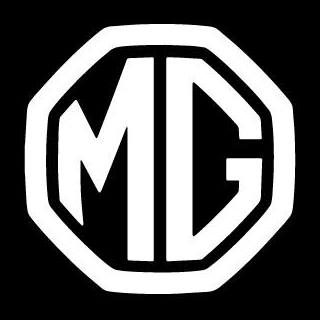

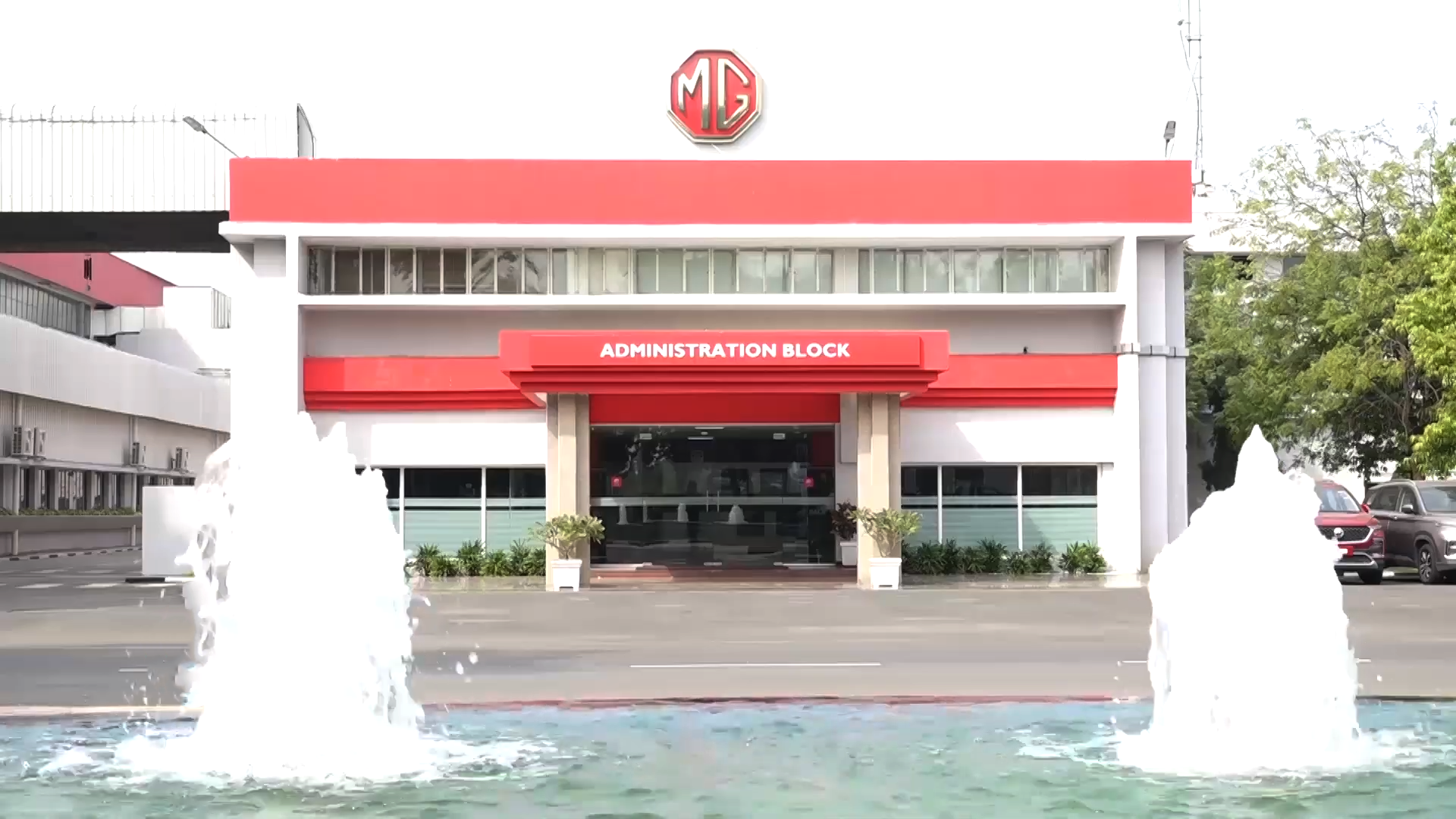
- MG Motor India facility in Halol, Gujarat
- Type: Joint venture
- Industry: Automotive
- Founded: 2017; 9 years ago
- Headquarters: Gurugram, Haryana, India
- Area served: India
- Key people: Rajeev Chaba (President & MD)
- Products: Automobiles
- Brands: MG Motor
- Owner: JSW Group; SAIC Motor
- Number of employees: 3,000+ (2023)
- Website: www.mgmotor.co.in

JSW MG Motor India Pvt Ltd, previously MG Motor India Private Limited until 2024, is an automobile manufacturer in India, which was established in 2019. Since 2023, it is a joint venture between the Mumbai-based Indian multinational conglomerate JSW Group and Shanghai-based Chinese automotive manufacturer SAIC Motor, a Chinese state-owned automobile manufacturer which markets vehicles under the British MG marque.

== History ==
The whole subsidiary was set up in the year 2017 by SAIC Motor and began its sales and manufacturing operations in 2019 from an old General Motors facility in Halol, Gujarat. The company was intended to allocate $650 million for investment, however the Government of India aimed to restrict funding from Beijing following a conflict in 2020 between troops of both nations along their disputed Himalayan boundary.

In May 2023, due to market policy by the Indian government, SAIC was forced to reduce shareholding in the venture. By November 2023, the company entered into a strategic joint venture with JSW Group, which allowed latter to acquire 35% in the company. Further, IndoEdge India Fund bought an 8% stake, while a dealer trust as well as an employee stock ownership plan, acquired 3% and 5% stakes, respectively, leaving SAIC with just 49% stake.

== Operations ==
JSW MG Motor India operates one manufacturing plant in the country, located in Halol, Gujarat. The plant has a capacity of 80,000 units per year and was previously owned by General Motors India, which halted its sales operations in India at the end of 2017. MG Motor India has invested more than ₹2,000 crore in revamping the 178 acre facility after its takeover from General Motors.

== Models ==
=== Current models ===
==== ICE vehicles ====
| Model | Indian introduction | Current model | | Notes |
| Model | Indian introduction | Introduction | Update (facelift) | Notes |
|---|---|---|---|---|
SUV/crossover
| Hector | 2019 | 2019 | 2025 | Rebadged from Baojun 530 |
| Hector Plus | 2020 | 2020 | 2025 | 7-seater variant of a rebadged Baojun 530 |
| Hector Tomahawk | 2026 | 2026 | — | Rebadged from Wuling Starlight 560; Plug-in hybrid powertrain is standard |
| Majestor | 2026 | 2026 | — | Rebadged from Maxus Territory |

==== Electric vehicles ====
| Model | Indian introduction | Current model | | Notes |
| Model | Indian introduction | Introduction | Update (facelift) | Notes |
|---|---|---|---|---|
Hatchback
| Comet EV | 2023 | 2023 | — | Rebadged from Wuling Air EV |
| Windsor EV | 2024 | 2024 | — | Rebadged from Baojun Yunduo |
Convertible
| Cyberster | 2025 | 2025 | — | Imported from China |
SUV/crossover
| ZS EV | 2020 | 2020 | 2022 | |
| Hector Tomahawk EV | 2026 | 2026 | — | Electric version of rebadged Wuling Starlight 560 |
| IM6 | 2026 (planned) | 2026 (planned) | — | Rebadged from IM LS6; Imported from China |
MPV
| M9 | 2025 | 2025 | — | Rebadged from Maxus Mifa 9 Imported from China |

=== Discontinued models ===
| Image | Model | Released | Discontinued |
|---|---|---|---|
| | Gloster | 2020 | 2026 |
| | Astor | 2021 | 2026 |

== See also ==
- Automotive industry in India
- JSW Group
- MG Motor
- SAIC Motor
- SGMW Motor Indonesia
