= Wuling Starlight S =

Compact crossover SUV

Overview
- Manufacturer: SAIC-GM-Wuling
- Model code: F510S
- Also called: Wuling Xingguang S; Chevrolet Captiva EV/PHEV (Latin America and Middle East)
- Production: August 2024 – present
- Assembly: China: Liuzhou, Guangxi; Brazil: Horizonte, Ceará (General Motors do Brasil)

Body and chassis
- Class: Compact crossover SUV (D)
- Body style: 5-door SUV
- Layout: Front-motor, front-wheel-drive (EV); Front-engine, front-motor, front-wheel drive (PHEV)
- Platform: Tianyu D Architecture
- Related: Wuling Starlight 560; Wuling Starlight 730; Wuling Starlight; Baojun Yunhai; Baojun Xiangjing

Powertrain
- Engine: Petrol plug-in hybrid: 1.5 L LBG I4
- Electric motor: Permanent magnet synchronous
- Power output: 150 kW (201 hp; 204 PS) (EV); 78 kW (105 hp; 106 PS) (PHEV, engine)
- Transmission: e-CVT (PHEV)
- Hybrid drivetrain: Plug-in hybrid
- Battery: 60 kWh LFP (EV); 9.5 kWh LFP (PHEV); 20.5 kWh LFP (PHEV)
- Range: 510 km (317 mi) (EV, CLTC); 60–130 km (37–81 mi) (PHEV, CLTC)

Dimensions
- Wheelbase: 2,800 mm (110.2 in)
- Length: 4,745 mm (186.8 in)
- Width: 1,890 mm (74.4 in)
- Height: 1,685 mm (66.3 in)
- Curb weight: 1,680–1,780 mm (66.1–70.1 in)

The Wuling Starlight S (Chinese: 五菱星光S; pinyin: Wǔlíng Xingguang S) is a compact crossover SUV manufactured by SAIC-GM-Wuling (SGMW) since 2024 under the Wuling brand. It is available as a plug-in hybrid and battery electric powertrains. The model was unveiled in April 2024 and went on sale in the domestic market in August 2024.

== Overview ==
The Starlight S was initially introduced as the Wuling Xingchen Plus in April 2024, borrowing its nameplate from the original Asta/Xingchen. It was renamed shortly before its market release, during its debut in July 2024. It instead derived its nameplate from the related Wuling Starlight sedan. It went on sale on 29 August 2024, offered in five trims in both PHEV (3 variants) and EV (2 variants).

The Starlight S is styled with the design language called "Star Wing Aesthetics", and built on the new energy-focused Tianyu D Architecture developed by SGMW. The company claimed that the model has 19 aerodynamic features to achieve a drag coefficient of 0.277 Cd.

The interior is equipped with a 15.6-inch central screen, and an 8.8-inch instrument panel. Its operating system is supported by a built-in Ling OS, which supports over-the-air (OTA) updates, voice recognition, and mobile phone remote control.

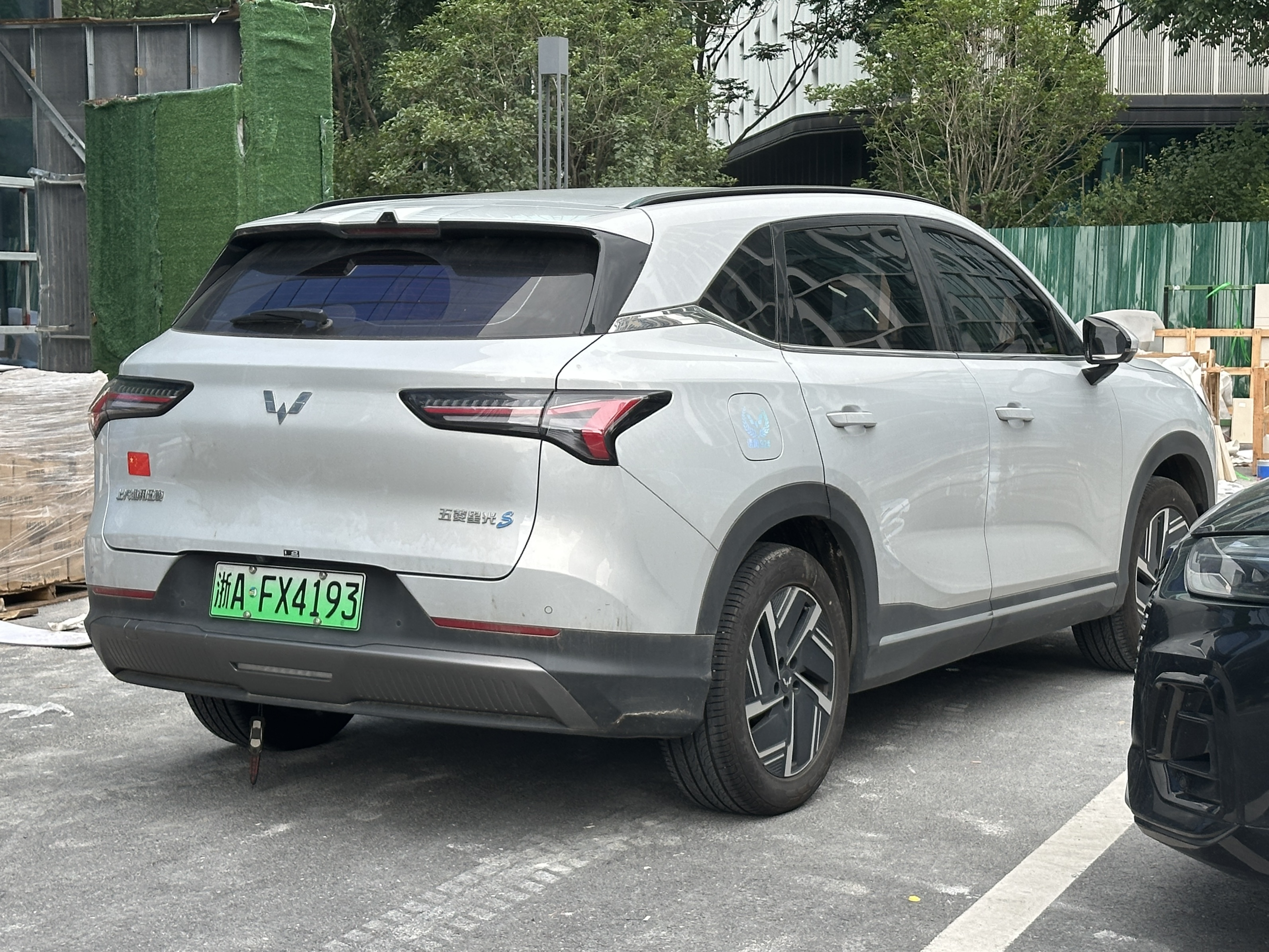
Rear view

== Powertrain ==
The plug-in hybrid variant of the Starlight S is powered by SGMW's Lingxi powertrain consisting of a 1.5-litre naturally aspirated engine and a front electric motor, coupled with lithium iron phosphate (LFP) battery packs branded as Shenlian battery. The maximum engine power is rated 78 kW (105 hp; 106 PS). Available battery capacities are 9.5 kWh and 20.5 kWh, with an electric range of 60 km (37 mi) and 130 km (81 mi) (under CLTC standards), respectively, and a combined range of 1,100 km (684 mi). The battery electric variant is equipped with a 150 kW (201 hp; 204 PS) front electric motor, matched with a 60 kWh LFP battery pack.

== Sales ==
Year	China		
Year	EV	PHEV	Total
2024	15,728	28,575	44,303
2025	7,976	13,346	21,322

== Chevrolet Captiva EV/PHEV ==
Both the plug-in hybrid and battery electric models was launched in Latin America and Middle East in 2025 under the Chevrolet brand as the Chevrolet Captiva EV and PHEV.

Chevrolet Captiva Premier EV

Chevrolet Captiva Premier PHEV

Rear view
