= Baojun Yunhai =

Compact crossover SUV

Overview
- Manufacturer: SAIC-GM-Wuling
- Model code: F410S
- Also called: Baojun E6; Wuling Cirro S (export); Yooudooo 3 Max (Spain)
- Production: August 2024 – present
- Assembly: China: Liuzhou, Guangxi

Body and chassis
- Class: Compact crossover SUV (C)
- Body style: 5-door SUV
- Layout: Front-motor, front-wheel-drive (EV); Front-engine, front-motor, front-wheel drive (PHEV)
- Platform: Tianyu D Architecture
- Related: Wuling Starlight 560; Wuling Starlight 730; Wuling Starlight S; Wuling Starlight; Baojun Xiangjing

Powertrain
- Engine: Petrol plug-in hybrid: 1.5 L LBG I4
- Electric motor: Permanent magnet synchronous
- Power output: 150 kW (201 hp; 204 PS) (EV); 78 kW (105 hp; 106 PS) (PHEV, engine); 150 kW (201 hp; 204 PS) (PHEV, system)
- Transmission: e-CVT (PHEV)
- Hybrid drivetrain: Plug-in hybrid
- Battery: 56.7 kWh LFP (EV); 69.2 kWh LFP (EV); 9.5 kWh LFP (PHEV); 20.5 kWh LFP (PHEV)
- Range: 500–600 km (311–373 mi) (EV, CLTC); 60–140 km (37–87 mi) (PHEV, CLTC)

Dimensions
- Wheelbase: 2,750 mm (108.3 in)
- Length: 4,541–4,590 mm (178.8–180.7 in)
- Width: 1,880 mm (74.0 in)
- Height: 1,608 mm (63.3 in)
- Curb weight: 1,645–1,760 mm (64.8–69.3 in)

The Baojun Yunhai (Chinese: 宝骏云海; lit. 'sea of clouds') is a compact crossover SUV manufactured by SAIC-GM-Wuling (SGMW) under the Baojun brand since 2024. Available as a plug-in hybrid or as a battery electric vehicle, the Yunhai was first introduced in May 2024 and went on sale in September 2024.

== Overview ==
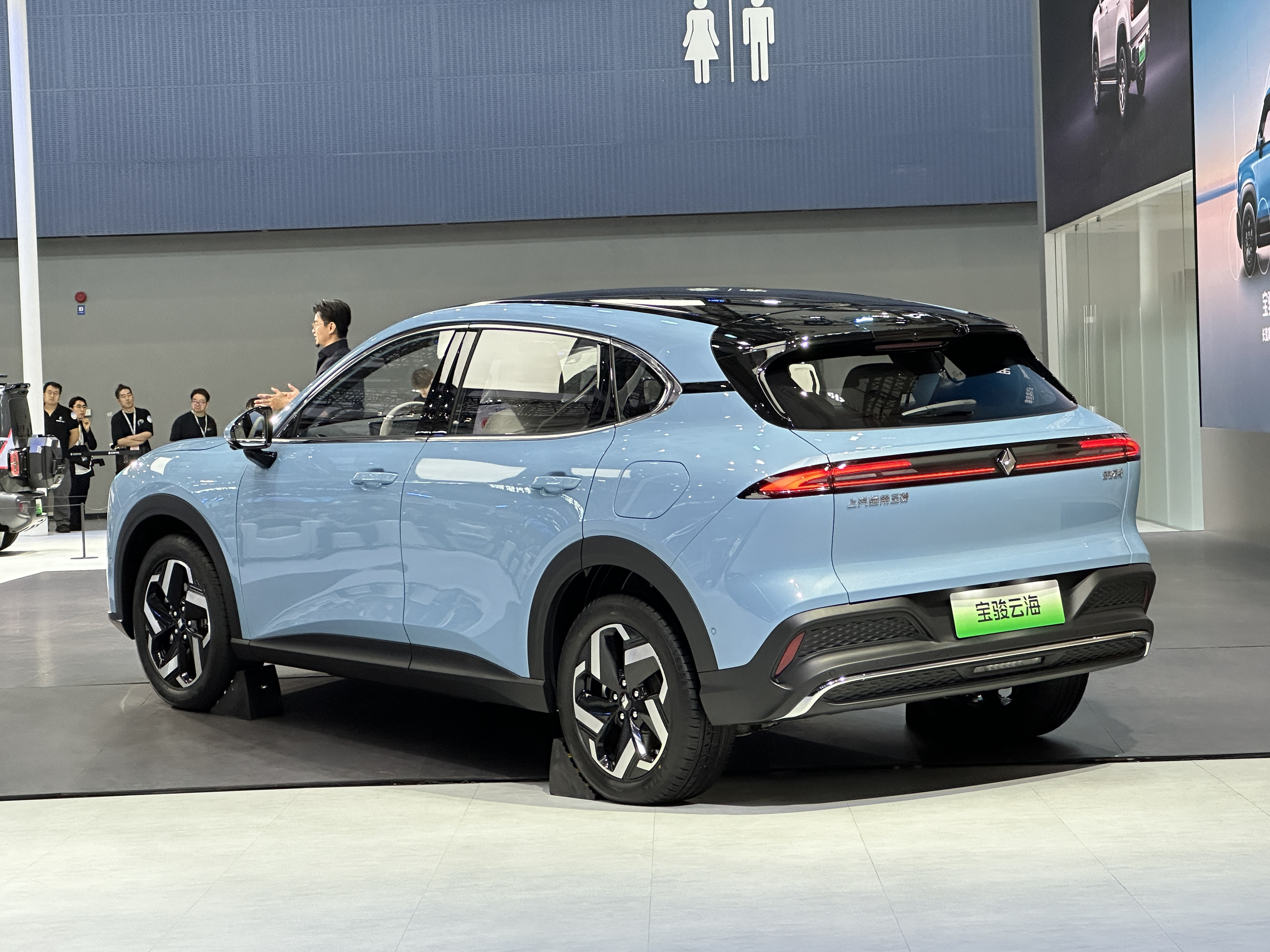
Rear view

During its introduction, it is available in two plug-in hybrid variants and two battery electric variants: the 60 km PHEV, the 140 km PHEV, the 500 km EV, and the 600 km EV. The Yunhai is built on the Tianyu D architecture for both plug-in hybrid and battery electric vehicles, featuring a drag coefficient of 0.259. It is also equipped with Lingmou Intelligent Driving 2.0 Max advanced intelligent driving system as standard.

== Sales ==
Year	China		
Year	EV	PHEV	Total
2024	7,615	2,682	10,017
2025	10,985	2,295	13,280
