= Wuling Starlight =

Mid-size sedan

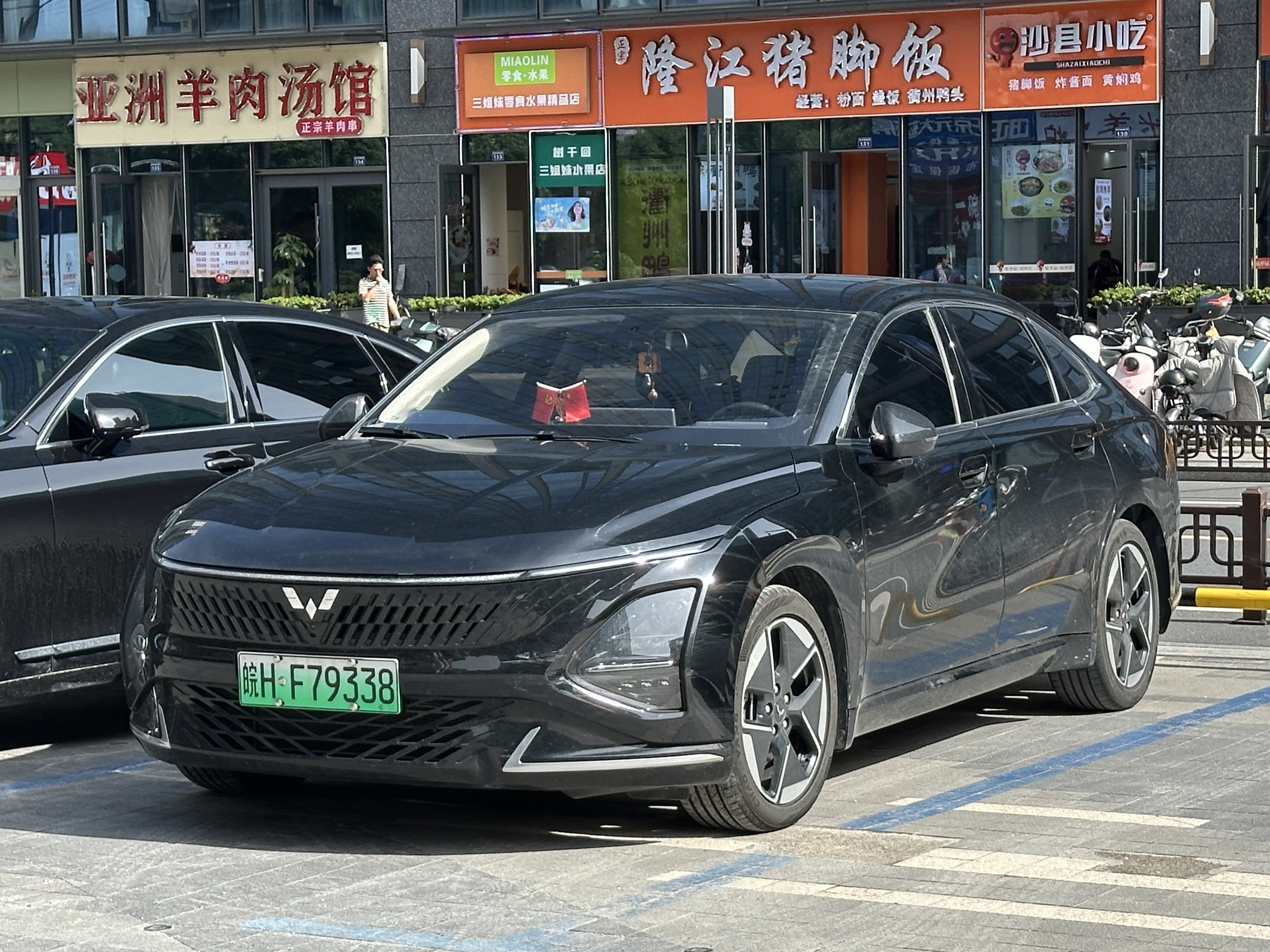

Overview
- Manufacturer: SAIC-GM-Wuling
- Model code: F510C
- Also called: Wuling Xingguang
- Production: 2023–present
- Assembly: China: Liuzhou, Guangxi; Qingdao, Shandong

Body and chassis
- Class: Mid-size car (D)
- Body style: 4-door sedan
- Layout: Front-motor, front-wheel-drive
- Platform: Tianyu D Architecture
- Related: Wuling Starlight 560; Wuling Starlight 730; Wuling Starlight S; Baojun Yunhai; Baojun Xiangjing

Powertrain
- Engine: 1.5 L LAR I4 (petrol)
- Electric motor: 100 kW (134 hp; 136 PS) TZ180XS2A0 Permanent magnet synchronous (EV & PHEV)
- Power output: 106–134 hp (107–136 PS; 79–100 kW)
- Transmission: 1-speed direct-drive (EV)
- Hybrid drivetrain: Plug-in hybrid
- Battery: Lithium-iron phosphate battery: 41.9 kWh (EV, lower version); 54.3 kWh (EV, higher version); 9.5 kWh (PHEV, lower version); 20.5 kWh (PHEV, higher version)
- Electric range: 410–510 km (255–317 mi) CLTC (EV); 70–150 km (43–93 mi) CLTC (PHEV)

Dimensions
- Wheelbase: 2,800 mm (110.2 in)
- Length: 4,835 mm (190.4 in)
- Width: 1,860 mm (73.2 in)
- Height: 1,515 mm (59.6 in)
- Curb weight: 1,600–1,695 kg (3,527.4–3,736.8 lb)

The Wuling Starlight (Chinese: 五菱星光; pinyin: Wǔlíng Xingguang) is a mid-size sedan manufactured by SAIC-GM-Wuling (SGMW) since 2023 under the Wuling brand.

== Overview ==
In August 2023, the Wuling was introduced its first large family passenger car, the Starlight 4-door sedan. The car's design features sharp lines and a slim silhouette with a low roofline. The rear of the vehicle is adorned with large, arched lighting, while the styling of the front fascia varies depending on the drive variant. The basic electric model is equipped with double-row headlights that showcase a distinctive boomerang motif in the upper lampshade.

The passenger cabin has been kept in light colors, with a focus on providing as many storage compartments and free spaces as possible. The center console is dominated by a large touch screen designed to control the most important vehicle functions. There are air vents low down, right at the edge of the center tunnel. The car can accommodate 33 litres (1.2 cu ft) of items in 14 different compartments throughout the cabin.

The Starlight was originally created for the domestic Chinese market, where it officially debuted in autumn 2023. The company two plants in China are set to produce the model line, and the price of the basic electric variant starts at 150,000 yuan. It was later made available in oversea markets.

In addition to the battery electric variant, the Starlight was also created in a hybrid version. Visually, it has gained a different front fascia with an air intake hidden in the body structure, a more vertically cut bumper and a differently shaped upper row of LED lighting.

Wuling Starlight (EV)

Rear view

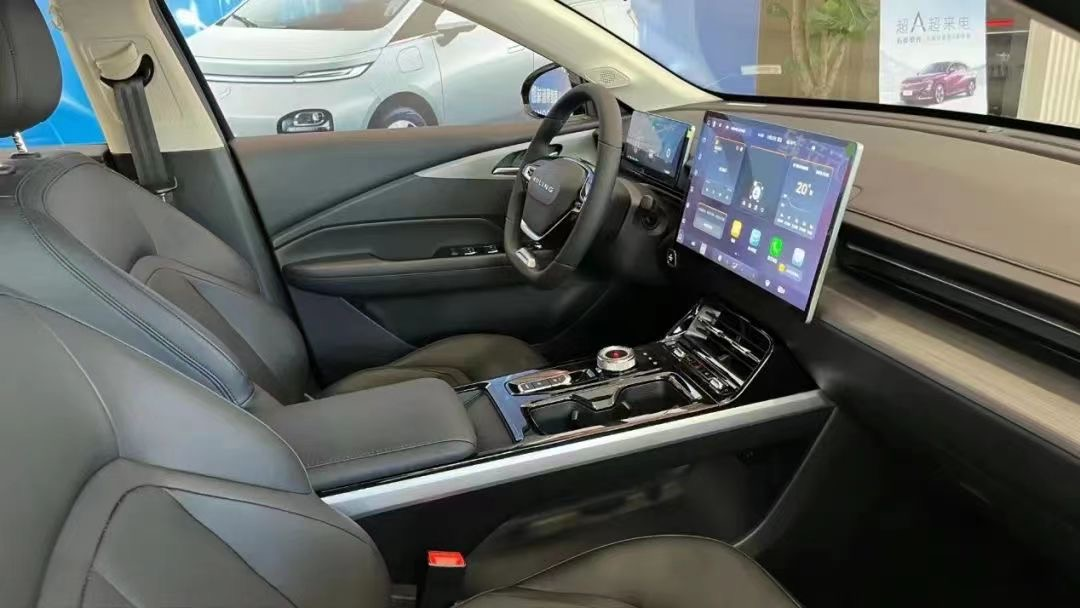
Interior

== Powertrain ==
The Starlight is available in either fully electric or plug-in hybrid forms. The battery electric version is powered by a 100 kW (134 hp; 136 PS) electric motor and an LFP battery of either 41.9 kWh or 54.3 kWh capacities, achieving a CLTC range rating of 410 or 510 kilometres (255 or 317 mi), respectively. Maximum speed is limited to 150 km/h (93 mph).

The plug-in hybrid Starlight's combustion-electric drive uses a 106 hp (79 kW; 107 PS) 1.5-liter naturally-aspirated petrol engine, and the maximum speed of the entire unit is limited to 150 km/h (93 mph).

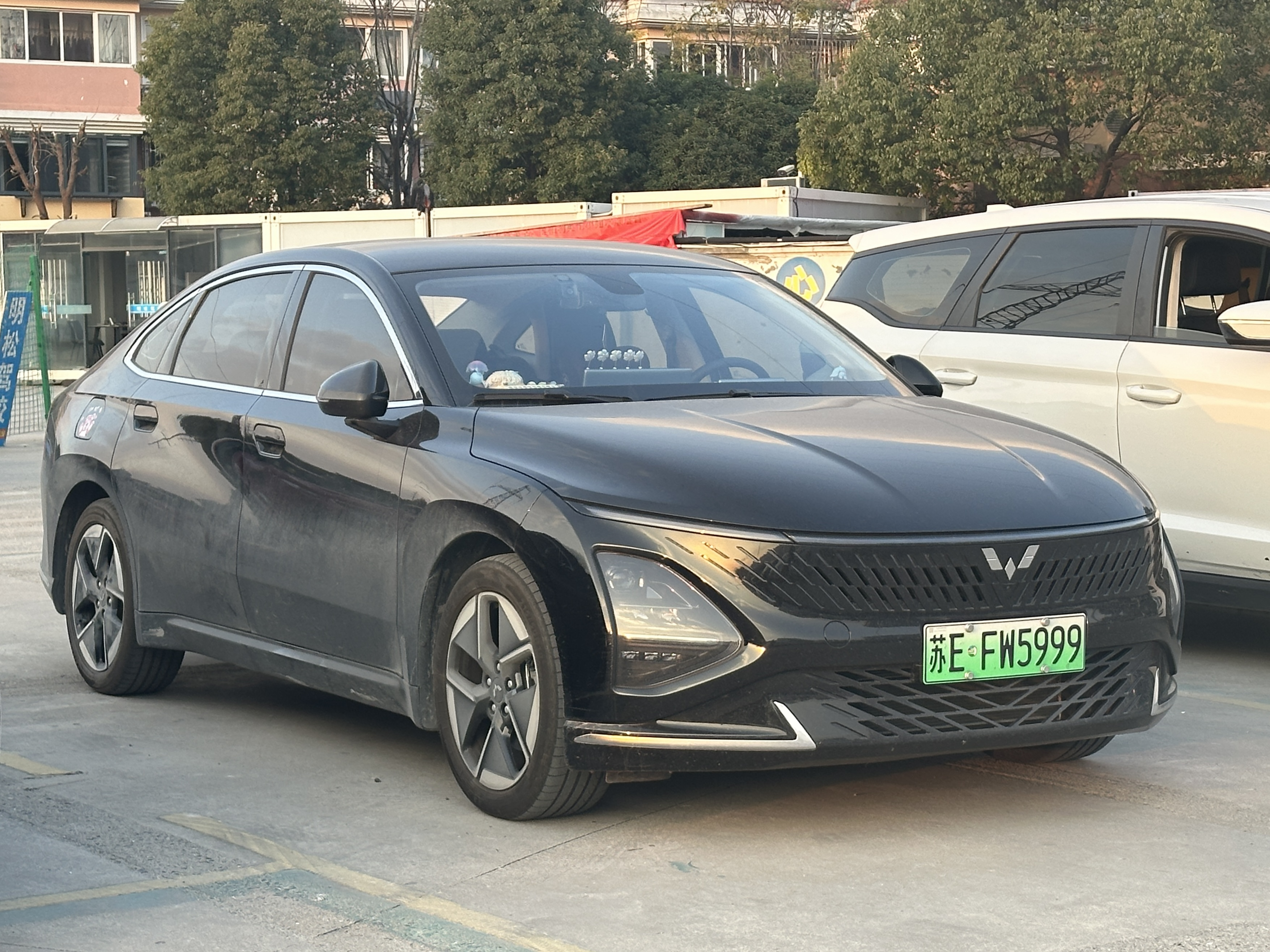
Wuling Starlight (PHEV)

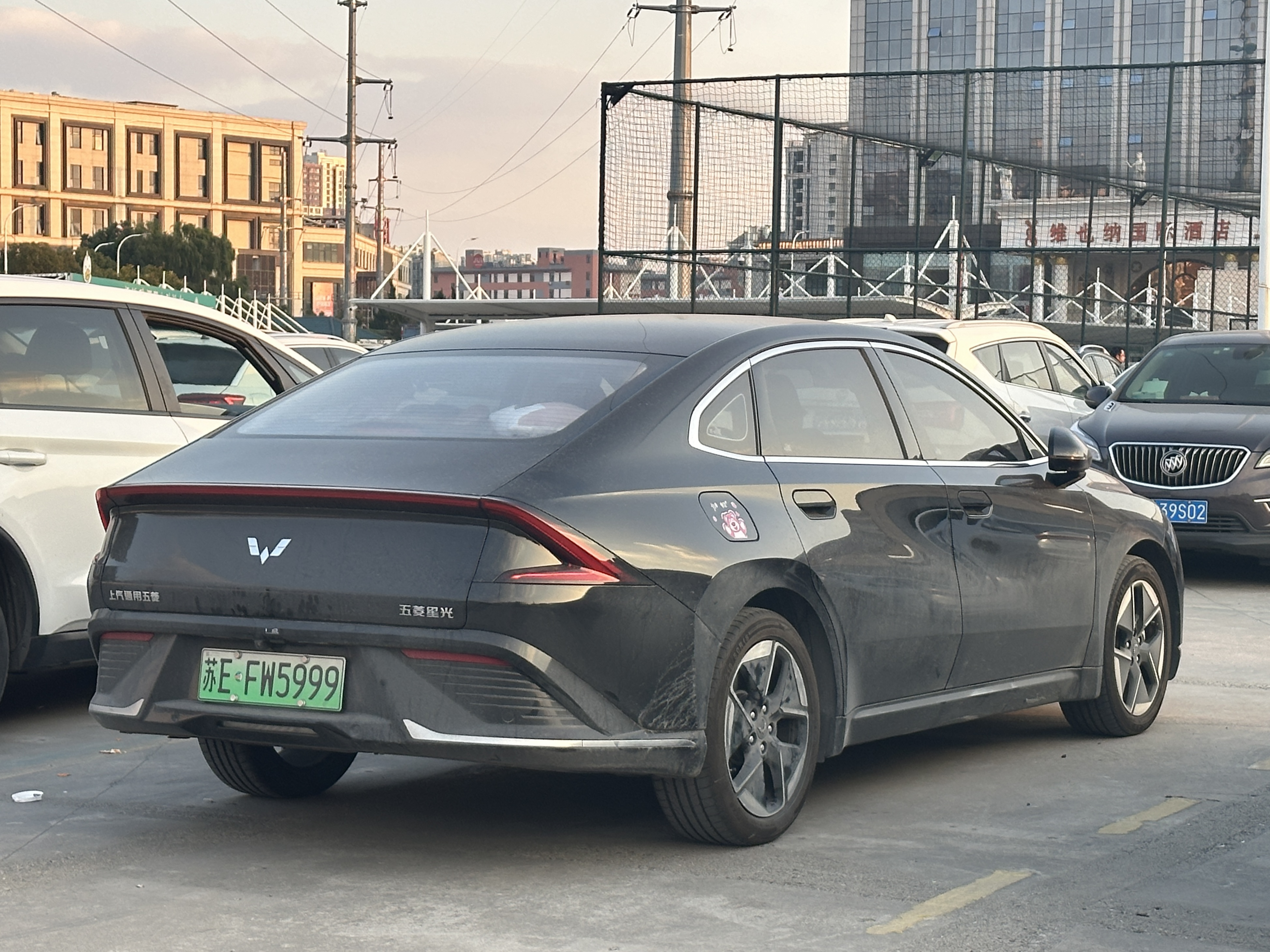
Rear view

== Oversea markets ==
=== Philippines ===
The Wuling Starlight EV was sold in the Philippines market from 2025.

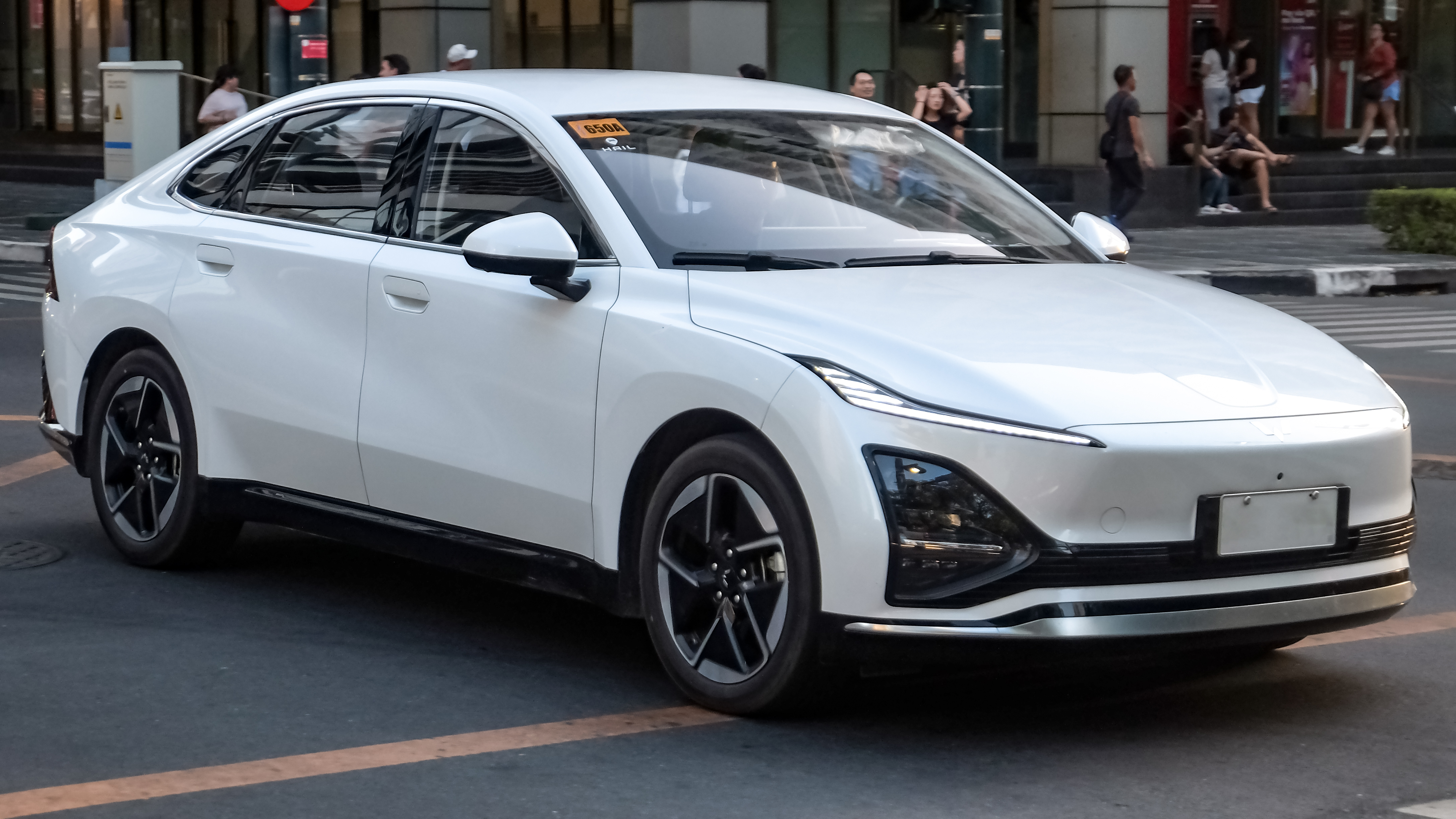
The Wuling Starlight EV in the Philippines.

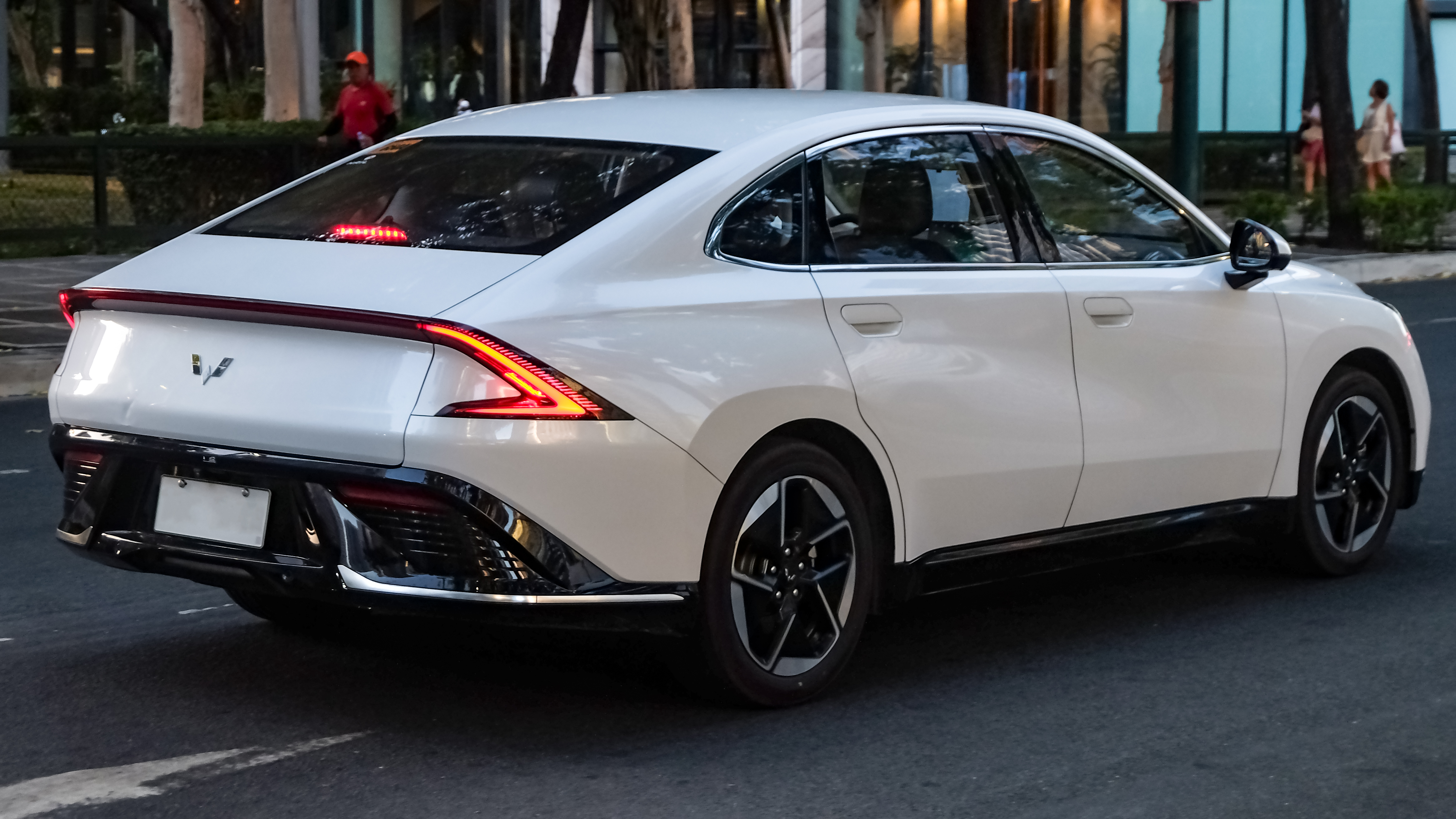
Rear view

== Nameplate use for other models ==
=== Wuling Starlight S ===
Wuling Starlight S

The Wuling Starlight S is a crossover SUV produced since 2024.

=== Wuling Starlight 730 ===
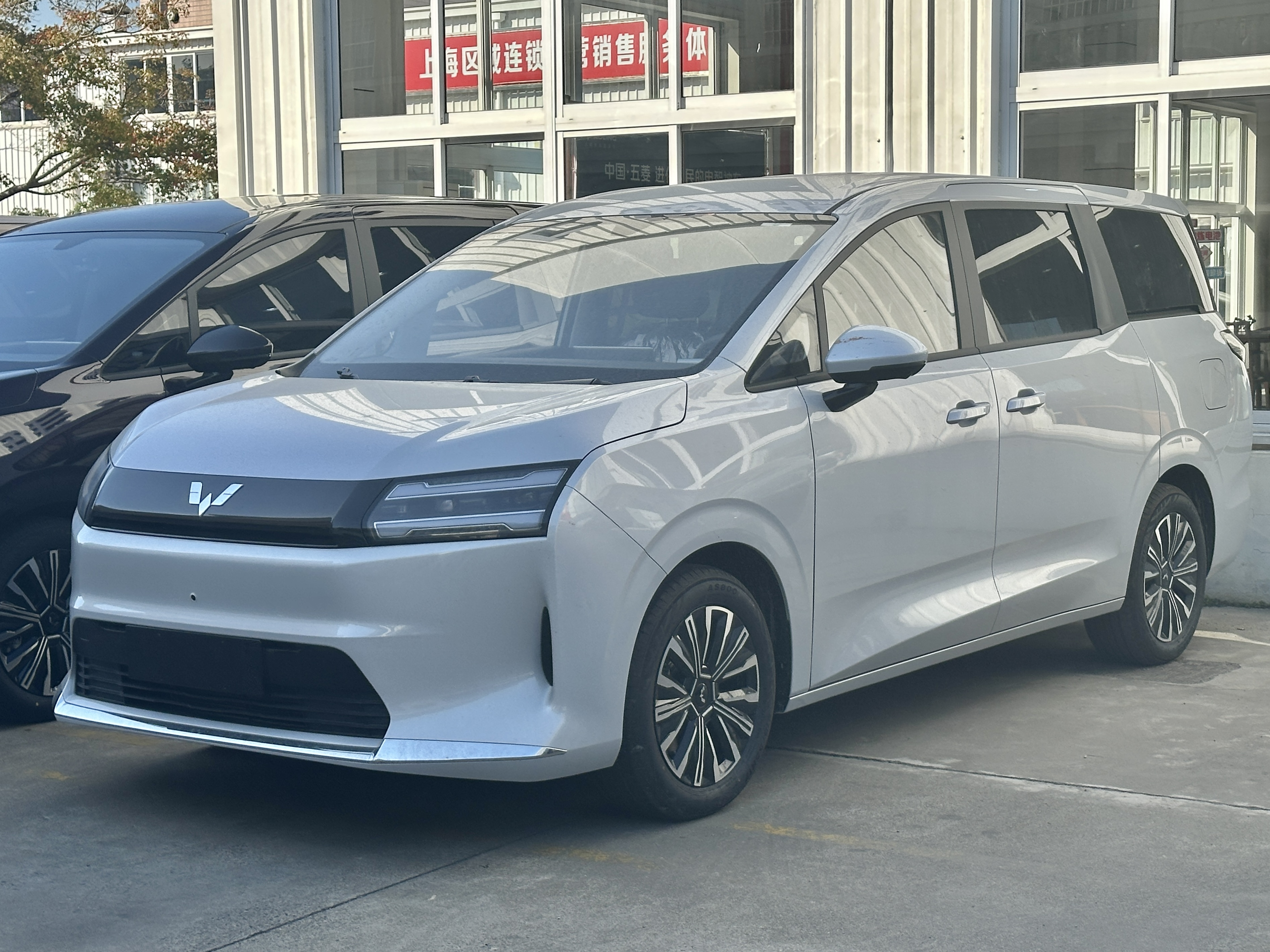
Wuling Starlight 730

The Wuling Starlight 730 is a MPV produced since 2025.

=== Wuling Starlight 560 ===
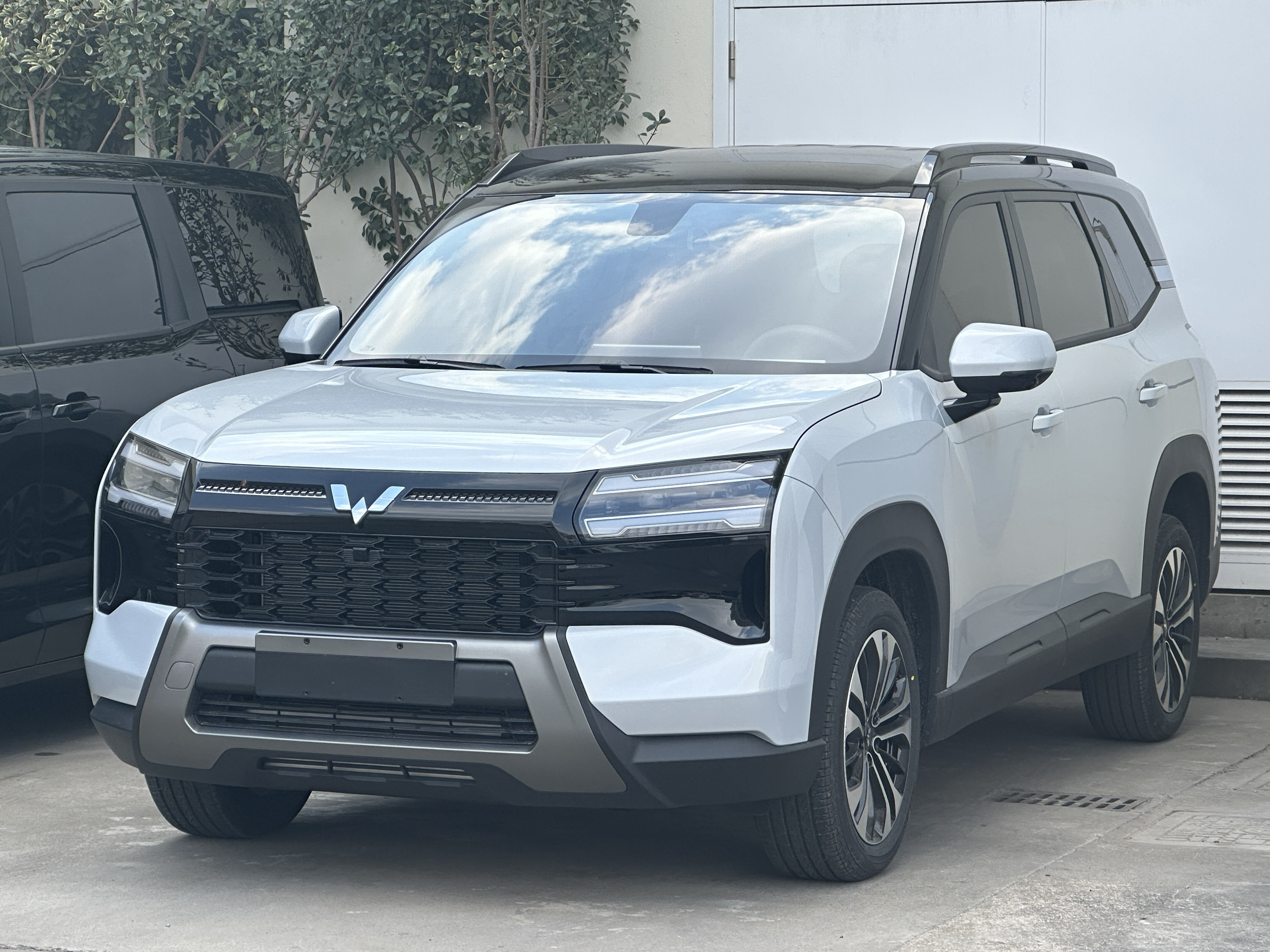
Wuling Starlight 560

The Wuling Starlight 560 is a crossover SUV produced since 2025.

=== Wuling Starlight L ===
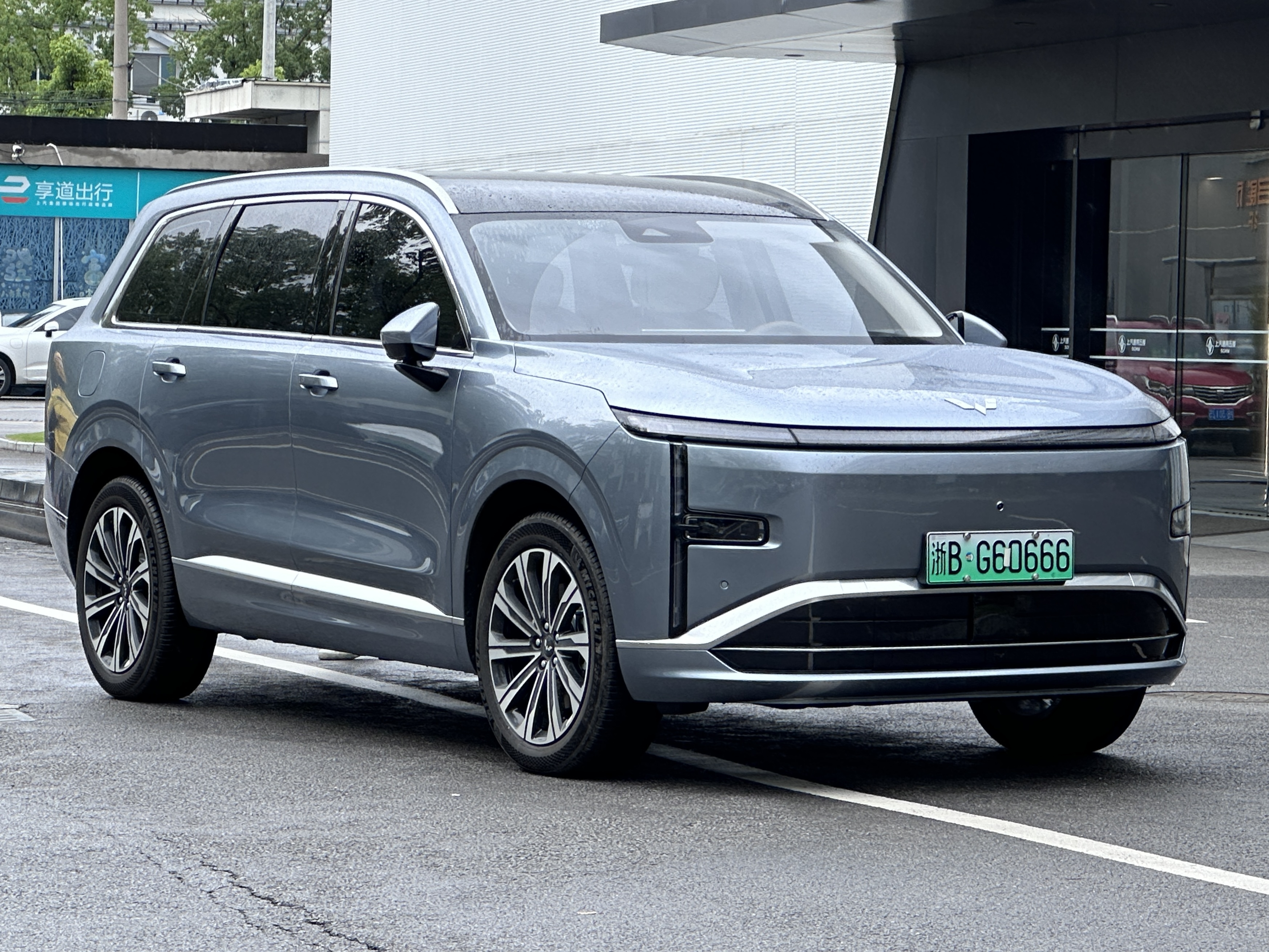
Wuling Starlight L

The Wuling Starlight L is a 5- to 6-seater midsize SUV produced since 2026.

=== Wuling Starlight M ===
Wuling Starlight M

The Wuling Starlight M is a full-size MPV produced since 2026.

== Sales ==
| Year | China | | |
| Year | EV | PHEV | Total |
|---|---|---|---|
| 2024 | 17,406 | 59,216 | 76,622 |
| 2025 | 10,793 | 10,840 | 21,633 |
