= Wuling Yangguang =

Battery electric van

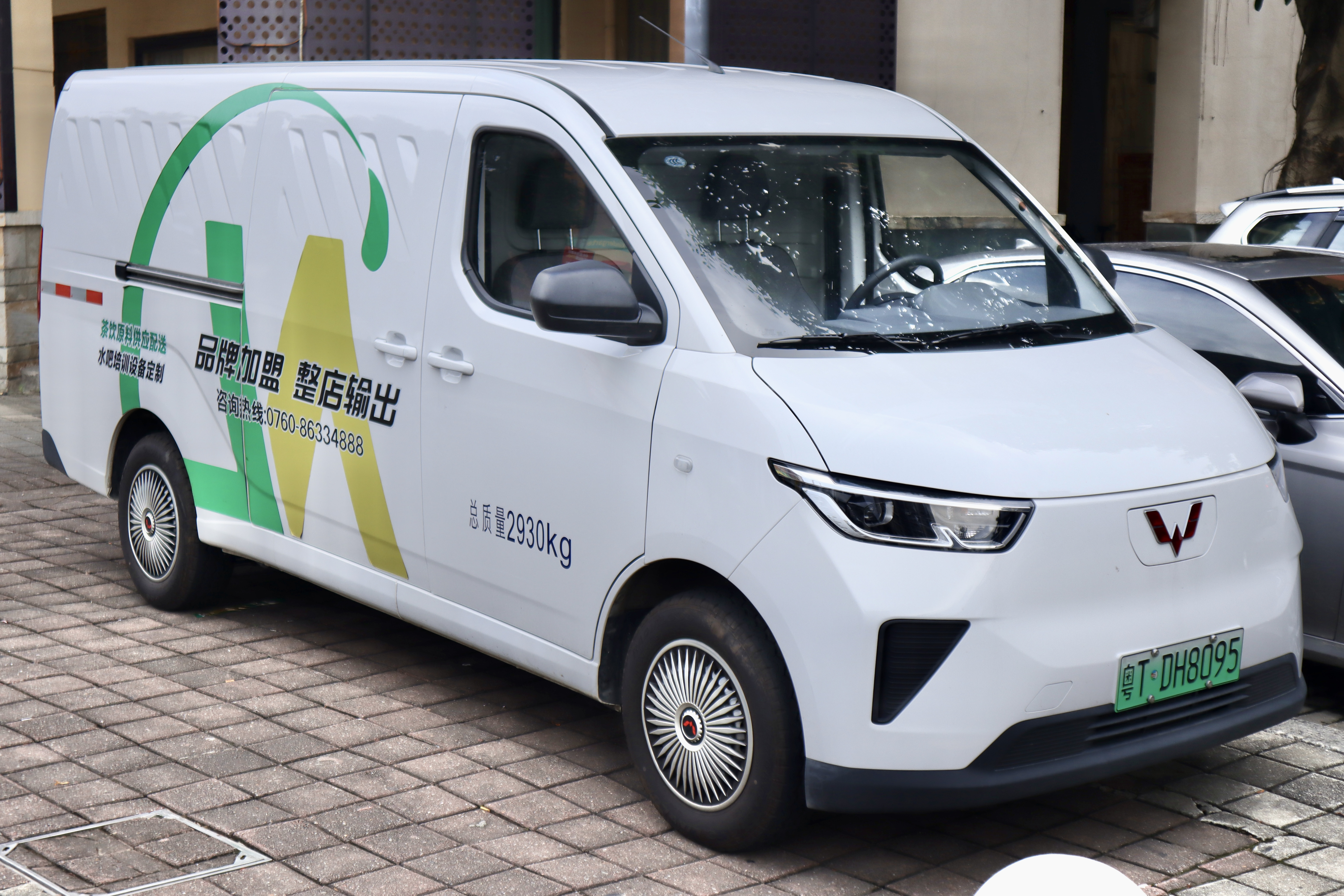
- The Wuling Yangguang in Guangdong.

Overview
- Manufacturer: SAIC-GM-Wuling
- Model code: N350VEV
- Also called: Wuling Mitra EV (Indonesia); Wuling Porta EV (Hong Kong, Thailand); Wuling Sunlight (Philippines); TQ Wuling Porta EV (Malaysia)
- Production: 2024–present
- Assembly: China: Liuzhou, Guangxi; Indonesia: Cikarang, West Java (SGMW Indonesia); Malaysia: Segambut (Tan Chong Motor)

Body and chassis
- Class: Light commercial vehicle
- Body style: 5-door van
- Layout: Rear-motor, rear-wheel-drive

Powertrain
- Electric motor: Permanent magnet synchronous
- Power output: 82–102 PS (60–75 kW; 81–101 hp) (electric motor)
- Battery: 31.9 kWh LFP Gotion/SVOLT; 41.9 kWh LFP Gotion/SVOLT; 43.53 kWh LFP CATL; 56.2 kWh LFP Sunwoda
- Electric range: 230–440 km (143–273 mi) (CLTC); 320 km (199 mi) (NEDC)

Dimensions
- Wheelbase: 3,050 mm (120.1 in)
- Length: 4,985–5,010 mm (196.3–197.2 in)
- Width: 1,800 mm (70.9 in)
- Height: 1,960–1,975 mm (77.2–77.8 in)
- Curb weight: 1,481–1,551 kg (3,265–3,419 lb)

The Wuling Yangguang (Chinese: 五菱扬光) is a battery electric light commercial van manufactured by SAIC-GM-Wuling (SGMW) since 2024 under the Wuling brand.

== Overview ==
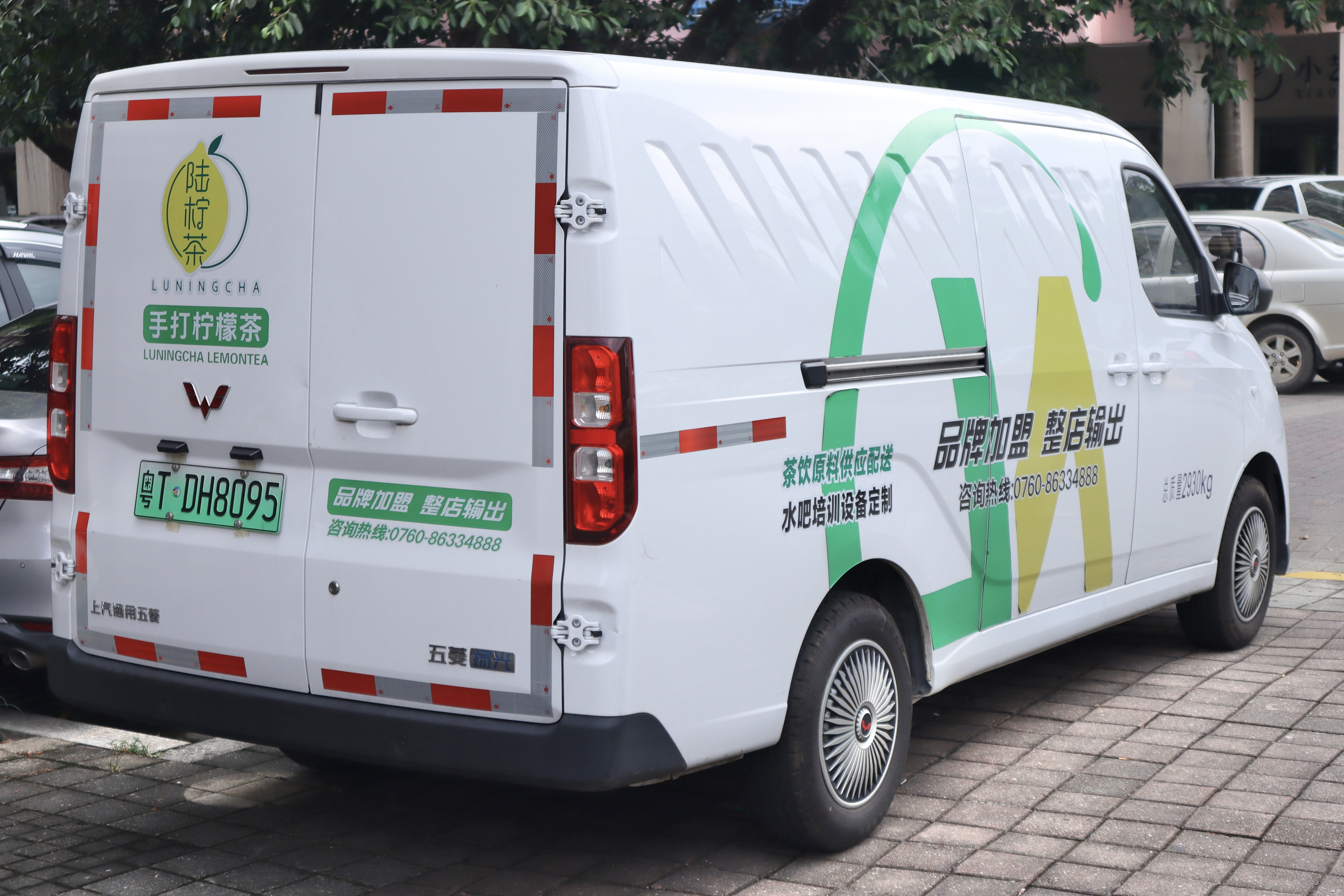
Rear view

The Yangguang is an fully electric urban logistics van by Wuling, specially designed for the needs of urban logistics and distribution.

It was originally available in two-seater cargo or 6-seater passenger variants, with a 9-seater model being added later. All models have sliding rear doors, and only passenger variants have rear windows.

In July 2025, The Wuling added new variants with an optional 9-seater configuration and 2 new battery options, one with a longer range of 400 km (250 mi) and one capable of faster charging from 30–80% in 15 minutes. The smallest battery option with 230 km (140 mi) of range was dropped.

== Specifications ==
The Yangguang is equipped with a permanent magnet synchronous electric motor powering the rear axle, with the output of which reaching 82 PS (60 kW; 81 hp) and 220 N⋅m (160 lb⋅ft) of torque, or upgraded to 102 PS (75 kW; 101 hp) and 180 N⋅m (130 lb⋅ft) of torque for higher end models.

The Yangguang is available with four different LFP-chemistry battery packs. At launch, it was available with either a 31.9 kWh pack providing a CLTC range of 230 km (143 mi) or 41.9 kWh pack with 300 km (186 mi) of range, both supplied by Gotion or SVOLT. In July 2025, a CATL-supplied 43.53 kWh pack capable of charging from 30–80% in 15 minutes with 310 km (193 mi) of range and a Sunwoda-supplied 56.2 kWh pack with 400 km (249 mi) of range became available. The top speed ranges from 90–100 km/h (56–62 mph).

Yangguang
Produced	Battery		Power	Torque	Range	30–80% charge time	Top speed
Produced	Type	Weight	Power	Torque	CLTC	30–80% charge time	Top speed
2024–2025	31.9 kWh LFP Gotion	250 kg (551 lb)	60 kW (82 PS)	220 N⋅m (162 lb⋅ft)	230 km (143 mi)	30 mins	100 km/h (62 mph)
2024–present	41.9 kWh LFP Gotion	326–332 kg (719–732 lb)	60 kW (82 PS)	220 N⋅m (162 lb⋅ft)	300 km (186 mi)	30 mins	100 km/h (62 mph)
2024–present	41.9 kWh LFP Gotion	326–332 kg (719–732 lb)	75 kW (102 PS)	180 N⋅m (133 lb⋅ft)	300 km (186 mi)	30 mins	100 km/h (62 mph)
2026–present	41.9 kWh LFP Gotion/SVOLT	326–332 kg (719–732 lb)	75 kW (102 PS)	180 N⋅m (133 lb⋅ft)	300 km (186 mi)	15 mins	90 km/h (56 mph)
2026–present	41.9 kWh LFP Gotion/SVOLT	326–332 kg (719–732 lb)	100 kW (136 PS)	200 N⋅m (148 lb⋅ft)	330 km (205 mi)	15 mins	100 km/h (62 mph)
2025–present	43.53 kWh LFP CATL	310 kg (683 lb)	75 kW (102 PS)	180 N⋅m (133 lb⋅ft)	310 km (193 mi)	15 mins	90 km/h (56 mph)
2026–present	43.53 kWh LFP CATL	310 kg (683 lb)	100 kW (136 PS)	200 N⋅m (148 lb⋅ft)	340 km (211 mi)	15 mins	100 km/h (62 mph)
2025–present	56.2 kWh LFP Sunwoda	399–404 kg (880–891 lb)	75 kW (102 PS)	180 N⋅m (133 lb⋅ft)	400 km (249 mi)	20 mins	100 km/h (62 mph)
2026–present	56.2 kWh LFP Sunwoda	399–404 kg (880–891 lb)	100 kW (136 PS)	200 N⋅m (148 lb⋅ft)	440 km (273 mi)	20 mins	100 km/h (62 mph)

The powertrain layout of the Wuling Yangguang is rear-wheel drive, with MacPherson-type independent front suspension and rear-dependent leaf springs. The cargo space capacity is 6.5 m^{3} (230 cu ft; 6,500 L) and the dimensions are 2,830 mm (111.4 in) by 1,680 mm (66.1 in) by 1,365 mm (53.7 in). Six-seater and nine-seater variants have 2,200 L (78 cu ft; 2.2 m^{3}) and 950 L (34 cu ft; 0.95 m^{3}) of rear cargo volume, respectively. The maximum payload is 1,249 kg (2,754 lb) and the maximum laden weight is 2,860 kg (6,305 lb).

It is also equipped with ABS with EBD, LED headlights, electric power steering, electronic parking brake, and lane departure warning. The dashboard has a 3.5-inch information display, which can be paired with an optional 8-inch central infotainment touchscreen.
