= Wuling Starlight 730 =

Mid-size MPV

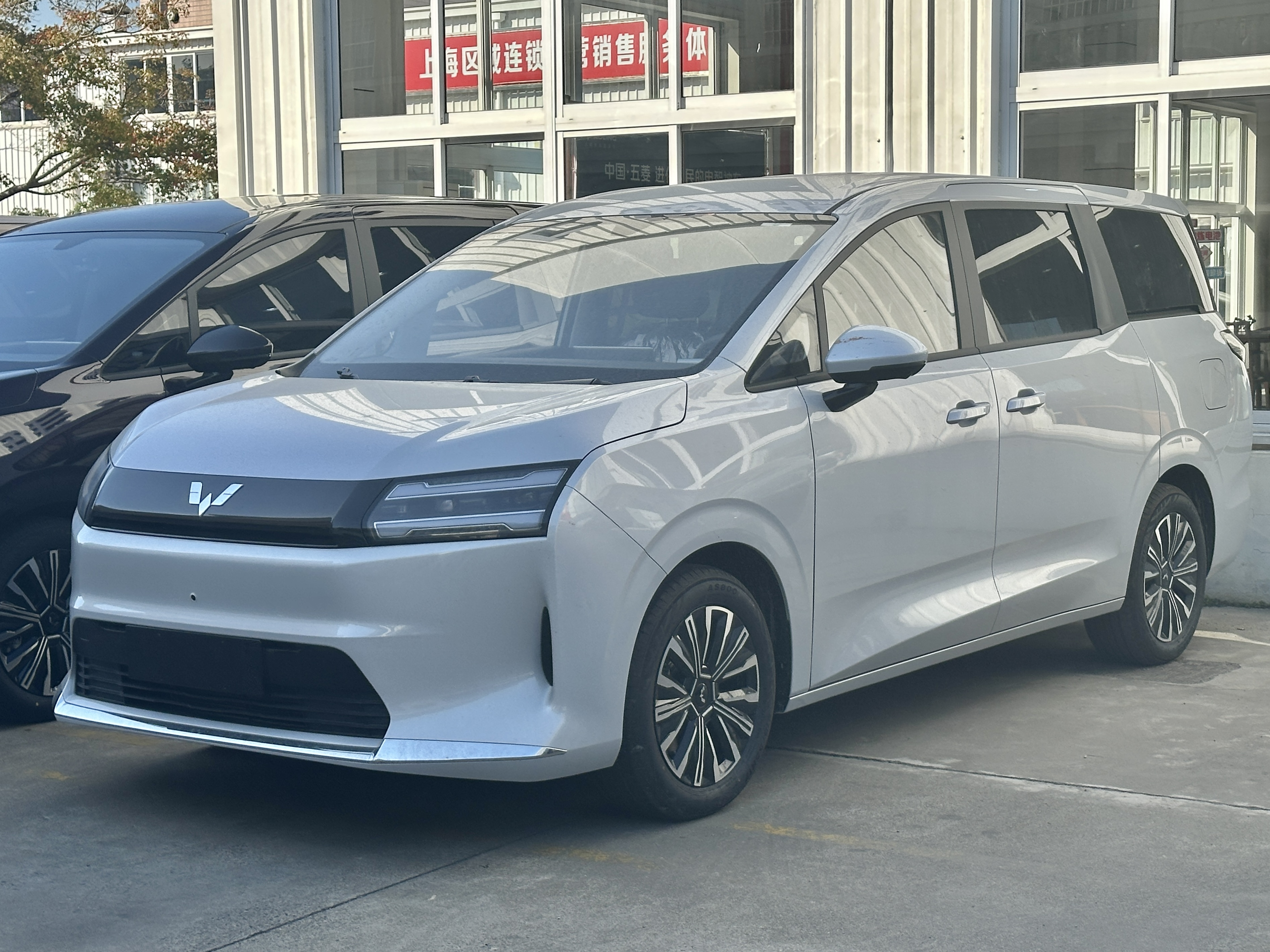
- Wuling Starlight 730 (EV)

Overview
- Manufacturer: SAIC-GM-Wuling
- Model code: F520M
- Also called: Wuling Xingguang 730; Wuling Darion (Indonesia, Hong Kong, Brunei, Vietnam); Wuling Starlight Darion EV (Thailand)
- Production: 2025–present
- Assembly: China: Liuzhou, Guangxi; Indonesia: Cikarang, West Java (SGMW Indonesia); Thailand: Laem Chabang (EV Primus)

Body and chassis
- Class: Mid-size MPV (M)
- Body style: 5-door minivan
- Layout: Front-engine, front-wheel-drive; Front-motor, front-wheel-drive (EV); Front-engine, front-motor, front-wheel drive (PHEV)
- Platform: Tianyu D Architecture
- Related: Wuling Starlight 560; Wuling Starlight S; Wuling Starlight; Baojun Yunhai

Powertrain
- Engine: Petrol: 1.5 L LC4 I4 turbo; Petrol plug-in hybrid: 1.5 L LBG I4
- Electric motor: Permanent magnet synchronous
- Transmission: 6-speed manual; CVT; Single-speed gear reduction (EV); e-CVT (PHEV)
- Hybrid drivetrain: Plug-in hybrid
- Battery: 9.5 kWh MAGIC Battery Pro LFP; 20.5 kWh MAGIC Battery Pro LFP; 60 kWh LFP; 69.2 kWh MAGIC Battery Pro LFP (Darion EV)
- Electric range: 500–540 km (311–336 mi) (EV, CLTC); 100 km (62 mi) (PHEV, WLTP); 125 km (78 mi) (PHEV, CLTC)

Dimensions
- Wheelbase: 2,910 mm (114.6 in)
- Length: 4,910 mm (193.3 in)
- Width: 1,850 mm (72.8 in)
- Height: 1,770 mm (69.7 in)
- Curb weight: 1,560–1,818 mm (61.4–71.6 in)

Chronology
- Predecessor: Baojun 730

The Wuling Starlight 730 (Chinese: 五菱星光730; pinyin: Wǔlíng Xingguang 730) is a mid-size MPV manufactured by SAIC-GM-Wuling (SGMW) since 2025 under the Wuling brand. It is available with three powertrain options: petrol engine, plug-in hybrid and battery electric. The model was unveiled on 25 June 2025.

== Overview ==
The Starlight 730 was introduced at the 2025 Chengdu Auto Show on 29 August 2025. The Starlight 730 is available in a petrol version powered by a turbocharged engine that delivers a maximum power output of 350 kW, a plug-in hybrid variant that combines a 12L motor system and generates a maximum power output of 78 kW, and a fully electric variant featuring an electric motor that produces up to 96.4 kW with a CLTC pure electric range of 450 to 500 kilometres.

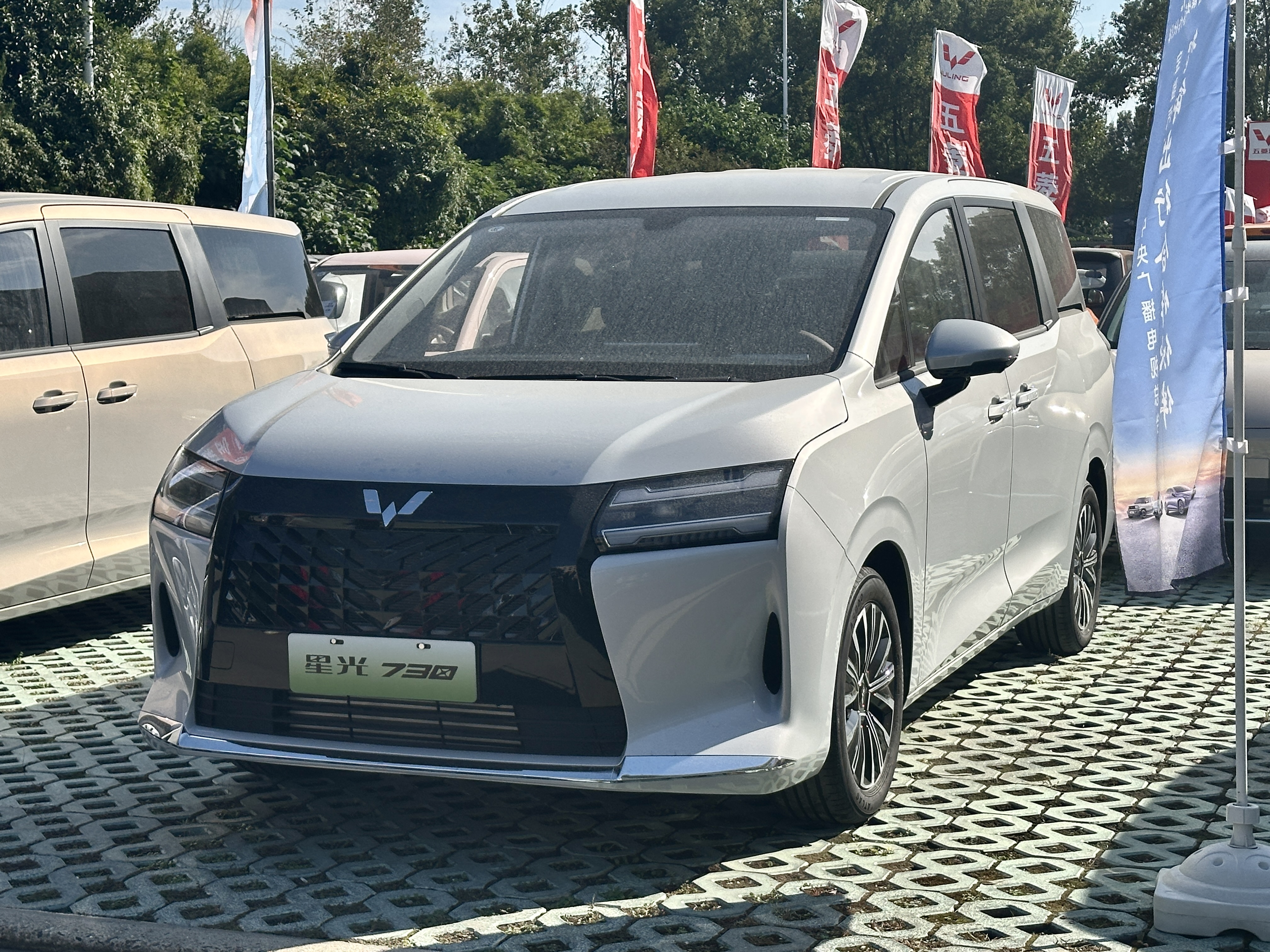
Wuling Starlight 730 (PHEV)

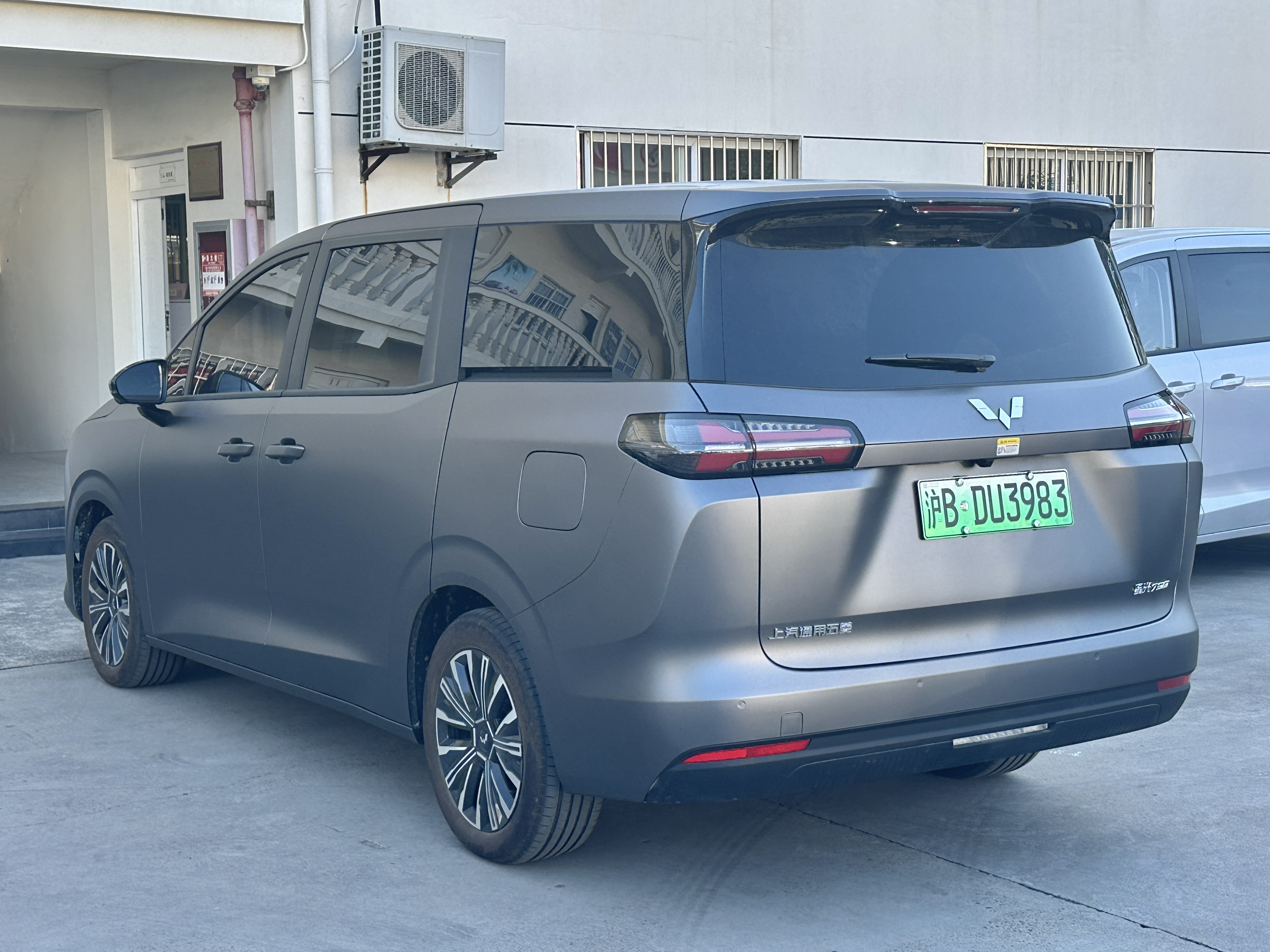
Rear view (EV)

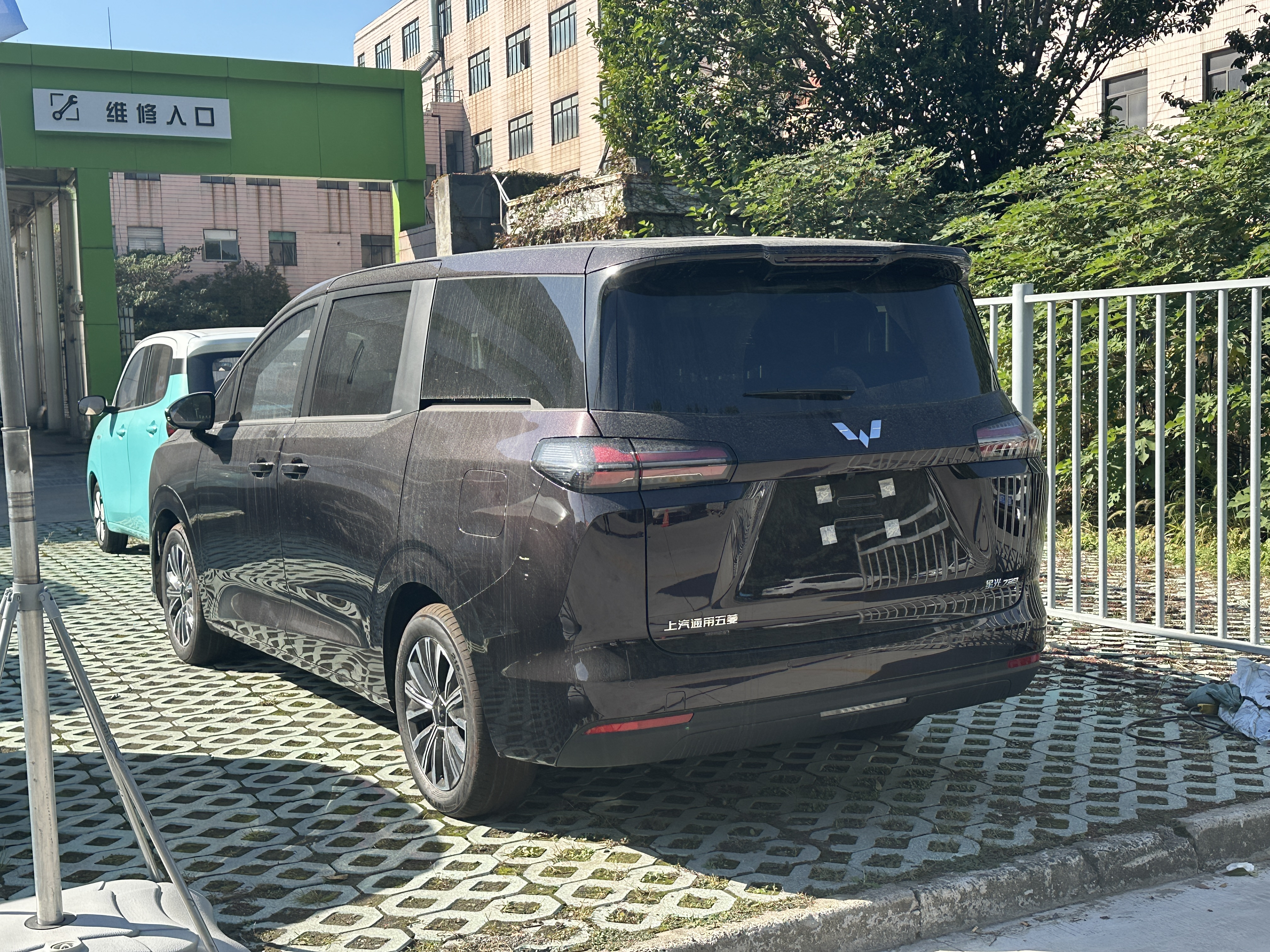
Rear view (PHEV)

== Markets ==
=== Brunei ===
The Darion was introduced in Brunei on 27 February 2026, with two variants: CE and EX, both variants are powered with the PHEV powertrain.

=== China ===
The Starlight 730 officially commenced pre-sales in China on 15 October 2025 and was launched on 14 November 2025. It is available with four variants: 1.5T 6MT Comfort, 1.5T CVT Elite, 125km Luxury (PHEV), and 500km Luxury (EV).

=== Hong Kong ===
The Darion EV was introduced in Hong Kong during the IMXpo 2025 on 11 December 2025. The Darion EV is imported from Indonesia for the Hong Kong market and became the first export country of the vehicle from Indonesia.

=== Indonesia ===
The Starlight 730 was also introduced in Indonesia during the 2025 GIIAS in July 2025, initially as the Wuling Cortez Darion and later simply as the Wuling Darion in PHEV and EV variants. According to SGMW Indonesia, the name Darion is short for Dari Indonesia (lit. 'From Indonesia'), alluding that the vehicle was assembled, and first introduced in Indonesia. The Cortez name which has been dropped was a nod to the mechanically unrelated Wuling Cortez. However, the Darion retains the physical "Cortez" emblem.

The Darion was launched in Indonesia on 5 November 2025, with two trim levels: CE and EX, both trim levels are each available with PHEV and EV powertrains.

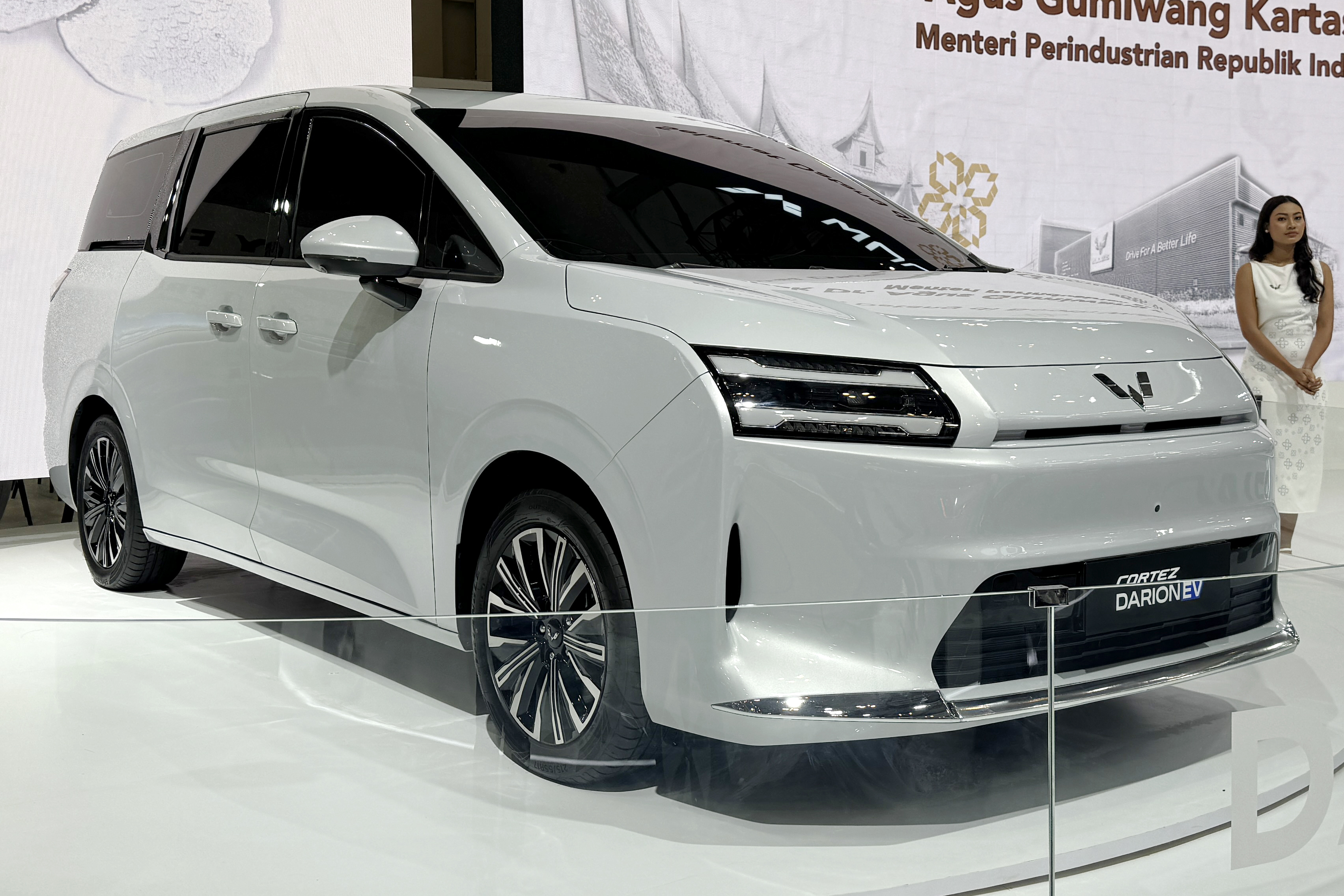
Wuling Darion (EV)

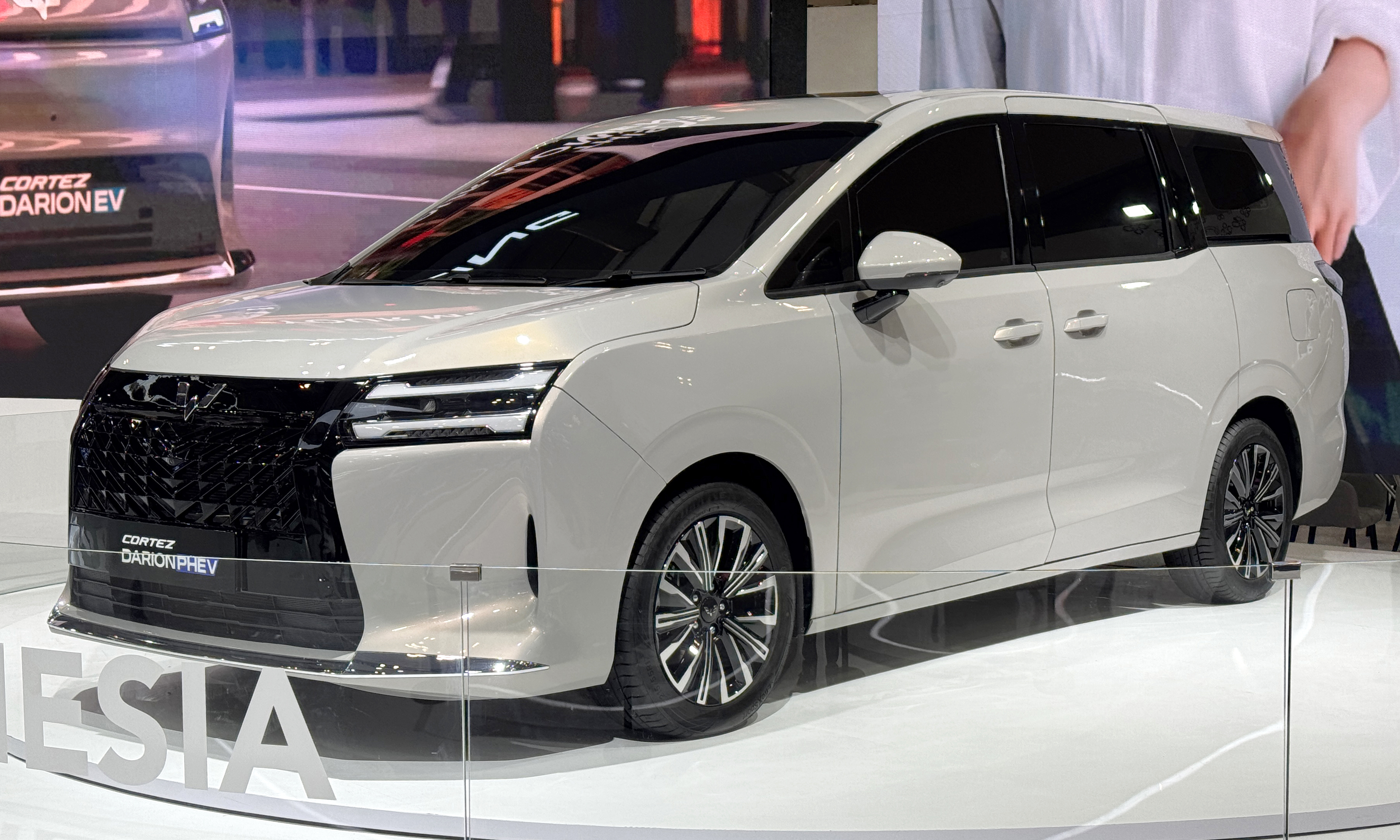
Wuling Darion (PHEV)

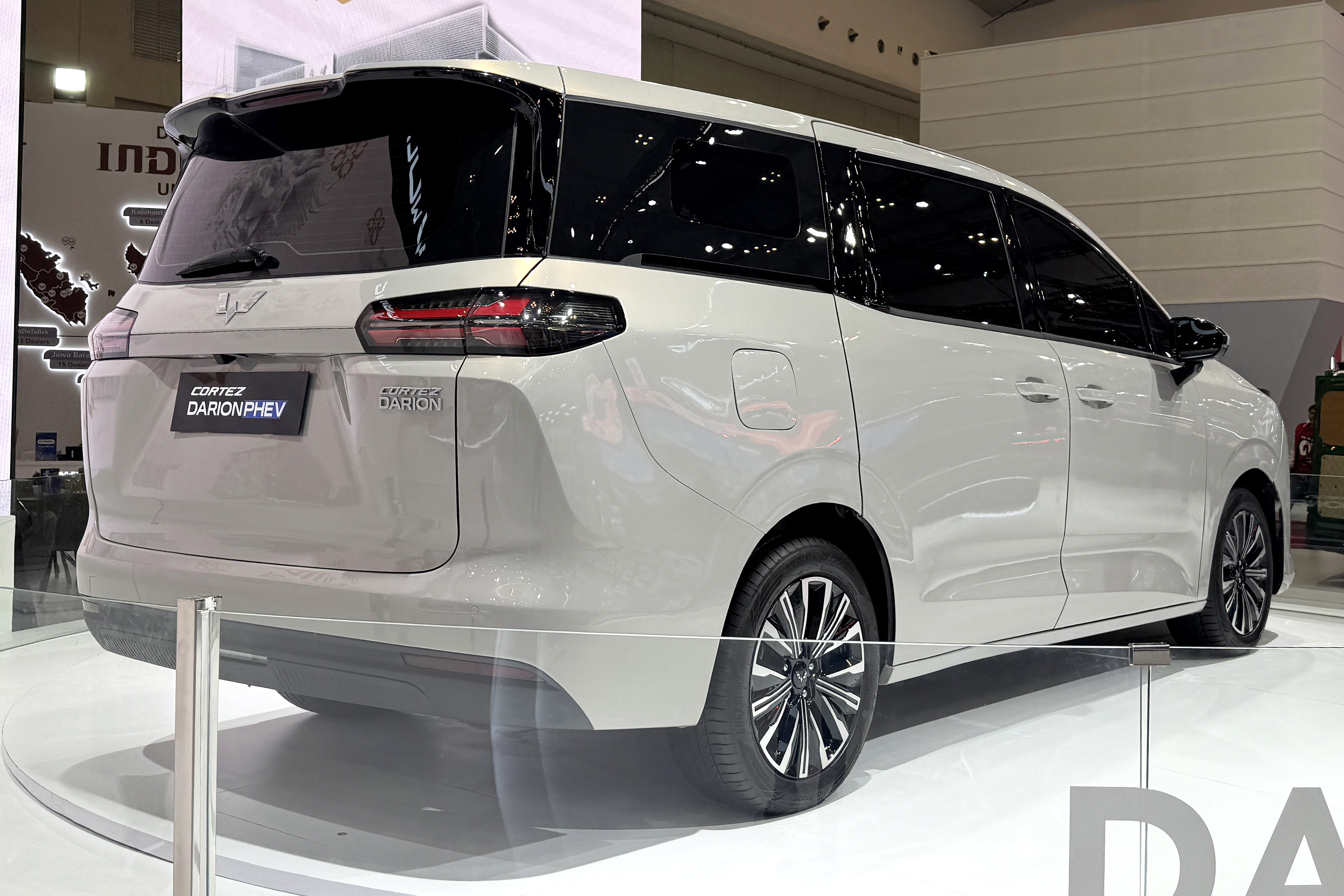
Rear view

=== Thailand ===
The Starlight Darion was launched in Thailand on 6 March 2026, imported from Indonesia with two variants: Comfort and Premium, both variants are powered with the EV powertrain.

=== Vietnam ===
The Darion was launched in Vietnam on 16 October 2026, with two variants: Eco (450 km) and Luxury (500 km), both variants are powered with the EV powertrain.

== Powertrain ==
Specifications
Model	Engine			Motor		Trans.	Battery		Electric range		30–80% charge	Kerb weight
Model	Type	Net power	Torque	Power	Torque	Trans.	Type	Weight	WLTP	CLTC	30–80% charge	Kerb weight
ICE manual	1.5 L LC4 I4 turbo	167 hp (125 kW; 169 PS) at 5,200 rpm	260 N⋅m (192 lb⋅ft) at 1,400–4,000 rpm	—	—	6-speed manual	—	—	—	—	—	1,560 kg (3,439 lb)
ICE CVT	1.5 L LC4 I4 turbo	167 hp (125 kW; 169 PS) at 5,200 rpm	290 N⋅m (214 lb⋅ft) at 1,500–3,500 rpm	—	—	CVT	—	—	—	—	—	1,610 kg (3,549 lb)
PHEV	1.5 L LBG I4	100 hp (75 kW; 101 PS) at 5,800 rpm	130 N⋅m (96 lb⋅ft) at 4,600–5,000 rpm	194 hp (145 kW; 197 PS)	230 N⋅m (170 lb⋅ft)	eCVT	20.5 kWh LFP Gotion/REPT	185 kg (408 lb)	100 km (62 mi)	125 km (78 mi)	30 min	1,818 kg (4,008 lb)
EV	—	—	—	134 hp (100 kW; 136 PS)	200 N⋅m (148 lb⋅ft)	1-speed gear reduction	60 kWh LFP REPT/Zenergy	424 kg (935 lb)	—	500 km (311 mi)	20 min	1,810 kg (3,990 lb)

== Sales ==
On 9 May 2026, Wuling announced the Starlight 730 achieved cumulative sales of over 45,000 vehicles. Wuling announced that the 100,000th Starlight 730 was produced on 17 November 2026.

Year	China			Indonesia		
Year	EV	PHEV	Total	EV	PHEV	Total
2025	5,002	7,562	12,564	1,706	232	1,938
