= SGMW Motor Indonesia =

Indonesian subsidiary of SAIC-GM-Wuling

PT SGMW Motor Indonesia
- Type: Subsidiary
- Industry: Automotive
- Founded: 2015
- Headquarters: Cikarang, Bekasi Regency, West Java, Indonesia
- Area served: Indonesia
- Key people: Tang Wensheng (President-Director)
- Products: Passenger cars Light commercial vehicles
- Production output: ▼24,456 vehicles (2023)
- Parent: SAIC-GM-Wuling
- Website: http://wuling.id

PT SGMW Motor Indonesia is a subsidiary of SAIC-GM-Wuling Automobile. It is the first Chinese automotive company to build a manufacturing plant in Indonesia.

Unlike their operations in China, SGMW Indonesia only markets vehicles in one marque under Wuling, instead of both Wuling and Baojun. However, the facilities also produce rebadged Chevrolet vehicles for exports and are shared with MG Motor to manufacture MG electric cars.

In 2018, Wuling Motors was the ninth largest automotive manufacturing company in Indonesia and the sixth largest passenger car manufacturing company in Indonesia by sales and production.

== History ==
The company started its operation by building its first plant in Greenland International Industrial Center in Cikarang, Bekasi Regency, West Java province on 20 August 2015. Built on a 600,000 m^{2} land including the supplier park, the plant was built for the production and manufacture of automobile in Indonesia and to set up an export base for Southeast Asia. The investment of the project is around US$700 million. The plant is expected to produce up to 150,000 vehicles in a year in its maximum capacity and is estimated to create 3,000 jobs for Indonesia.

In August 2016, SGMW Motor Indonesia joined the 2016 Gaikindo Indonesia International Auto Show and showcased the Wuling Hongguang S1 and Baojun 730. On 11 July 2017, the plant officially started its operations for mass production and was inaugurated by the vice president of Indonesia, Jusuf Kalla. Their first product was a compact MPV named Confero, which is a rebadged Hongguang S1. Initial pricing started at Rp 128 million, making it the cheapest MPV in its respective class. At the end of 2017, Wuling Motors quickly climbed into the top-10 car brand in Indonesia by production and sales.

On 9 February 2018, the company launched the Cortez, a rebadged Baojun 730. On 7 November 2018, Wuling launched the Formo as a commercial variant of the Confero. At the end of 2018, Wuling missed the targeted vehicle sales of 30,000 units, instead recorded 17,002 units for the wholesales figure and 15,162 units for the retail sales figure.

On 27 February 2019, Wuling unveiled the Almaz, a rebadged Baojun 530 as their first SUV in Indonesia. Wuling announced that it would export the Almaz to Thailand, Brunei and Fiji as the Chevrolet Captiva.

On 10 August 2022, SGMW Motor Indonesia introduced its first battery electric car in Indonesia, the Air EV. In April 2023, Indonesian buyers of the car will receive incentives of battery-based electric cars, in the form of VAT subsidies, from 11% to 1%. Wuling Air EV is the best selling electric car in Indonesia for 2022, account for 77.98% of electric car sales in the country for 2022.

In February 2023, Wuling announced the Alvez, a rebadged Wuling Xingchi as their second SUV in Indonesia.

On 18 August 2023, PT SGMW Motor Indonesia said that its production facilities will be shared with PT SAIC Motor Indonesia to manufacture MG Motor (other brand owned by SAIC, the parent company of SGMW), which commenced production of MG4 EV and MG ZS EV in February 2024. As of February 2026, it also produces the MGS5 EV.

On 16 November 2023, Wuling announced the Binguo EV as their second battery electric car to enter Indonesia.

On 15 February 2024, Wuling announced the Cloud EV as their third battery electric car to enter Indonesia, to complete their 'ABC Trio' electric car lineup.

On 11 July 2025, Wuling announced the Mitra EV, a rebadged Wuling Yangguang as their fourth battery electric car to enter Indonesia. Wuling announced that it would export the Mitra EV to Thailand and Hong Kong as the Porta EV.

On 23 July 2025, Wuling announced the Darion, a rebadged Wuling Starlight 730 as the fifth battery electric car and first plug-in hybrid electric car to enter Indonesia.

On 5 February 2026, Wuling announced the Eksion, a rebadged Wuling Starlight 560 as the sixth battery electric car and second plug-in hybrid electric car to enter Indonesia.

On 11 July 2026, Wuling announced the Aira EV, a rebadged Wuling Hongguang Mini EV as their seventh electric car to enter Indonesia.

== Models ==
Model	Indonesian introduction	Current model		Current production status
Model	Indonesian introduction	Introduction	Update/facelift	Current production status
Hatchback
Air EV	2022	2022	2025	Assembled in Indonesia
Aira EV	2026	2026	–	Assembled in Indonesia
Binguo EV	2023	2023	2025	Assembled in Indonesia
Cloud EV	2024	2024	2025	Assembled in Indonesia
SUV/crossover
Alvez	2023	2023	2025	Assembled in Indonesia
Eksion	2026	2026	–	Assembled in Indonesia
MPV
Confero	2017	2017	2021	Assembled in Indonesia
Darion	2025	2025	–	Assembled in Indonesia
Light commercial vehicle
Formo	2018	2018	2023	Assembled in Indonesia
Mitra EV	2025	2025	–	Assembled in Indonesia

== Sales ==
Production
Year	Confero	Formo	Formo Max	Cortez	Alvez	Almaz/ Chevrolet Captiva	Air EV	Binguo EV	Cloud EV	Total
2017	6,026	–	–	123	–	–	–	–	–	6,149
2018	9,558	132	–	6,456	–	–	–	–	–	16,146
2019	9,475	251	–	2,581	–	12,673	–	–	–	24,980
2020	3,268	321	–	1,426	–	2,338	–	–	–	7,353
2021	10,561	1,375	–	4,314	–	10,027	–	–	–	26,277
2022	10,831	815	245	4,587	–	5,541	8,422	–	–	30,441
2023	6,077	942	1,374	387	5,956	2,297	5,626	1,797	–	24,456
2024	2,791	242	165	15	2,772	1,755	4,320	6,018	3,696	21,774
Total	58,587	4,078	1,784	19,889	8,728	34,631	18,368	7,815	3,696	157,576

Wholesales
Year	Confero	Formo	Formo Max	Cortez	Alvez	Almaz	Air EV	Binguo EV	Cloud EV	Total
2017	4,958	–	–	92	–	–	–	–	–	5,050
2018	11,062	83	–	5,857	–	–	–	–	–	17,002
2019	9,137	301	–	3,160	–	9,743	–	–	–	22,341
2020	3,060	388	–	5,676	–	1,947	–	–	–	11,071
2021	10,488	999	–	4,423	–	9,694	–	–	–	25,604
2022	10,844	1,285	–	3,905	–	5,406	8,053	–	–	29,493
2023	5,887	763	1,319	824	5,923	1,856	5,575	1,393	–	23,540
2024	3,109	455	1,045	255	2,768	1,174	4,440	5,156	3,521	21,923
Total	58,545	4,274	2,364	24,192	8,691	29,820	18,068	6,549	3,521	156,024

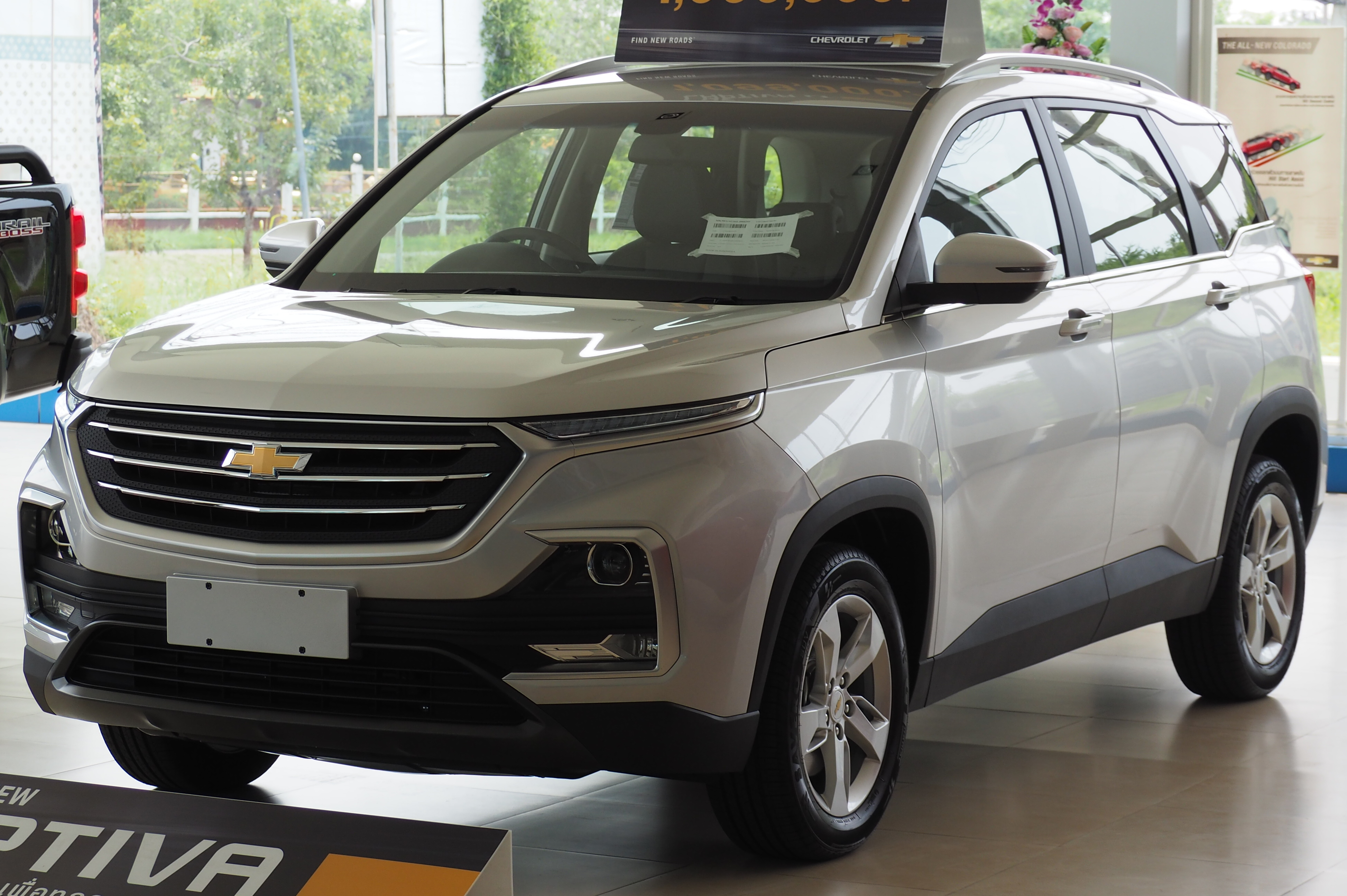
2019 Chevrolet Captiva (Thailand)

Retail
Year	Total
2017	3,268
2018	15,162
2019	21,112
2020	9,523
2021	23,920
2022	24,270
2023	25,992
2024	25,067
Total	148,314

Exports
Year	Chevrolet Captiva/ Almaz	Cortez	Formo	Air EV	Alvez	Confero	Binguo EV	Cloud EV
2019	2,696	–	–	–	–	–	–	–
2020	584	27	–	–	–	–	–	–
2022	31	3	3	26	–	–	–	–
2023	2	12	7	1,504	–	–	–	–
2024	77	36	6	34	34	11	878	25
Total	3,390	78	16	1,564	34	11	878	25
