= Baojun Xiangjing =

Mid-size sedan

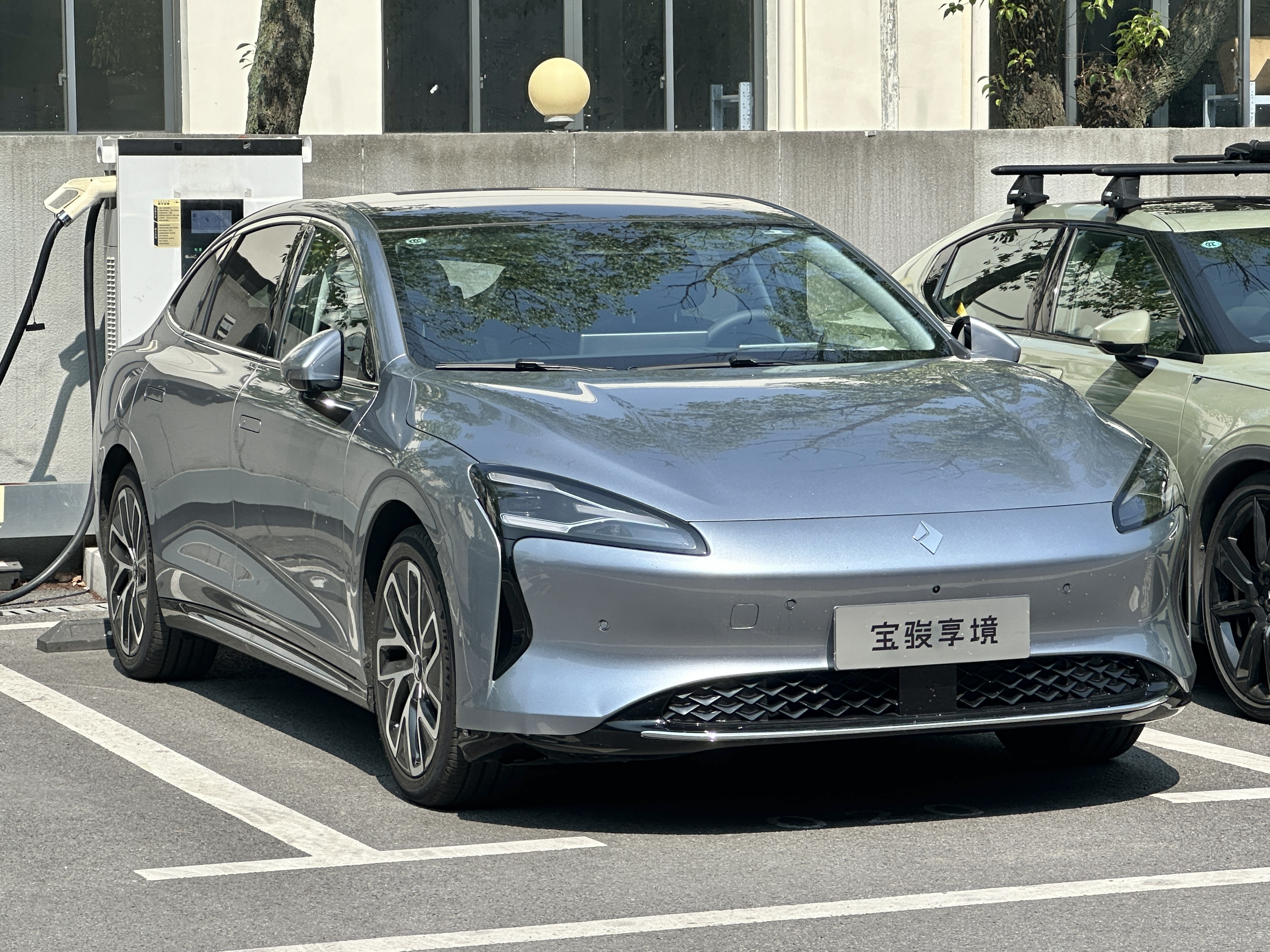
- Baojun Xiangjing (EV)

Overview
- Manufacturer: SAIC-GM-Wuling
- Model code: EQ200
- Production: 2024–present
- Assembly: China: Liuzhou, Guangxi
- Designer: Yutian Gao

Body and chassis
- Class: Mid-size car (D)
- Body style: 4-door sedan
- Layout: Front-engine, front-wheel-drive
- Platform: Tianyu D Architecture
- Related: Wuling Starlight; Baojun Yunhai

Powertrain
- Engine: 1.5 L LBT I4 turbo
- Electric motor: Permanent magnet synchronous
- Transmission: Single-speed (EV); e-CVT (PHEV)
- Hybrid drivetrain: Power-split
- Battery: 20.5 kWh LFP Gotion; 69.2 kWh LFP Zenergy
- Electric range: 600 km (373 mi) (CLTC, EV); 101 km (63 mi) (WLTP, PHEV); 140 km (87 mi) (CLTC, PHEV)

Dimensions
- Wheelbase: 2,900 mm (114 in)
- Length: 5,005 mm (197 in)
- Width: 1,900 mm (75 in)
- Height: 1,490 mm (59 in) (EV); 1,505 mm (59 in) (PHEV)
- Curb weight: 1,905 kg (4,200 lb) (EV); 1,840 kg (4,057 lb) (PHEV)

Chronology
- Predecessor: Baojun RC-6

The Baojun Xiangjing (Chinese: 宝骏享境) is a mid-size sedan manufactured by SAIC-GM-Wuling (SGMW) under the Baojun brand since 2024. The first production Xiangjing was manufactured in December 2024 at the lean intelligent manufacturing (LIM) facility of SAIC-GM-Wuling (SGMW) in Liuzhou, Guangxi. The Xiangjing went on sale in April 2025 during Auto Shanghai.

== Overview ==
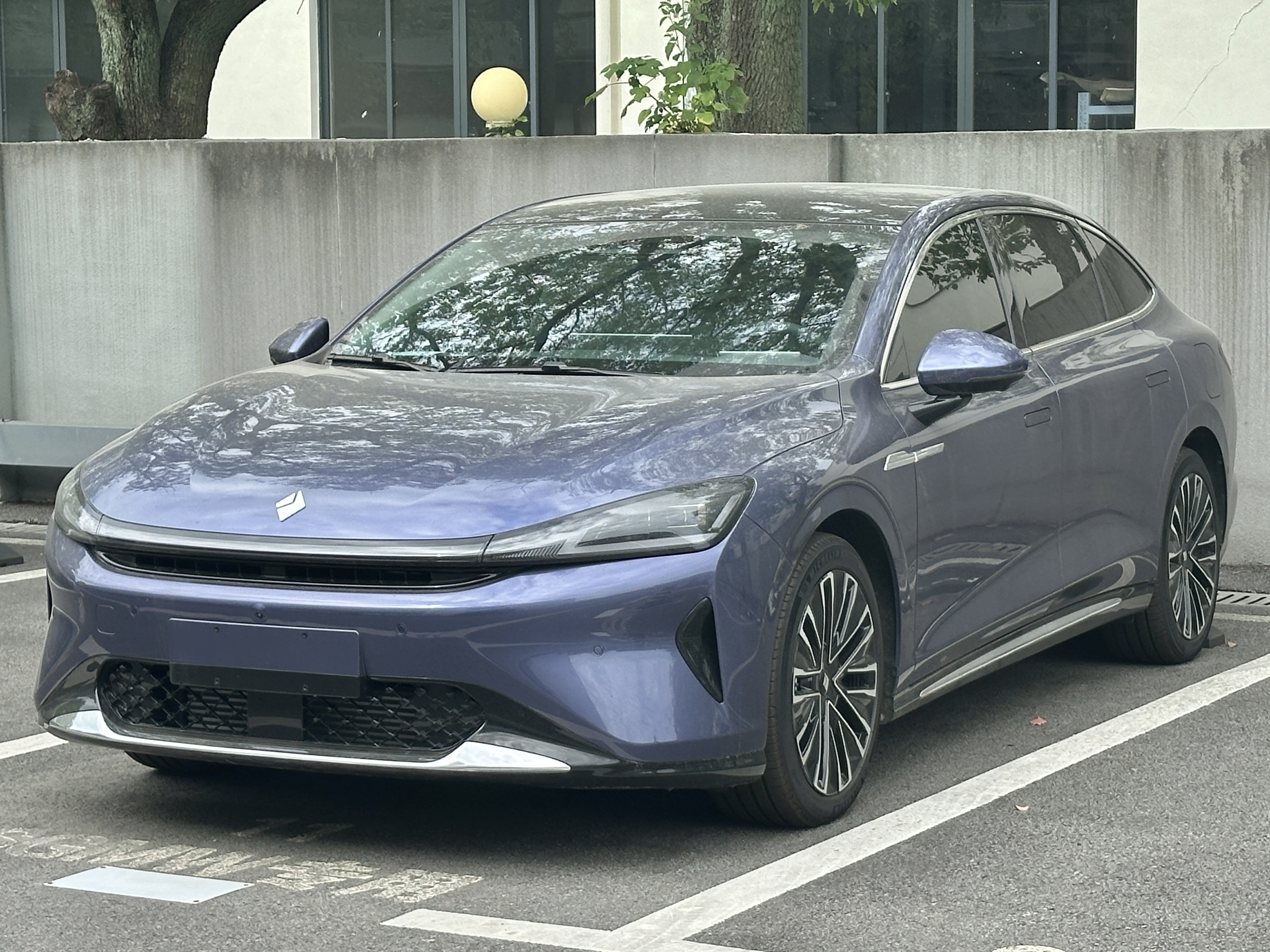
Baojun Xiangjing (PHEV)

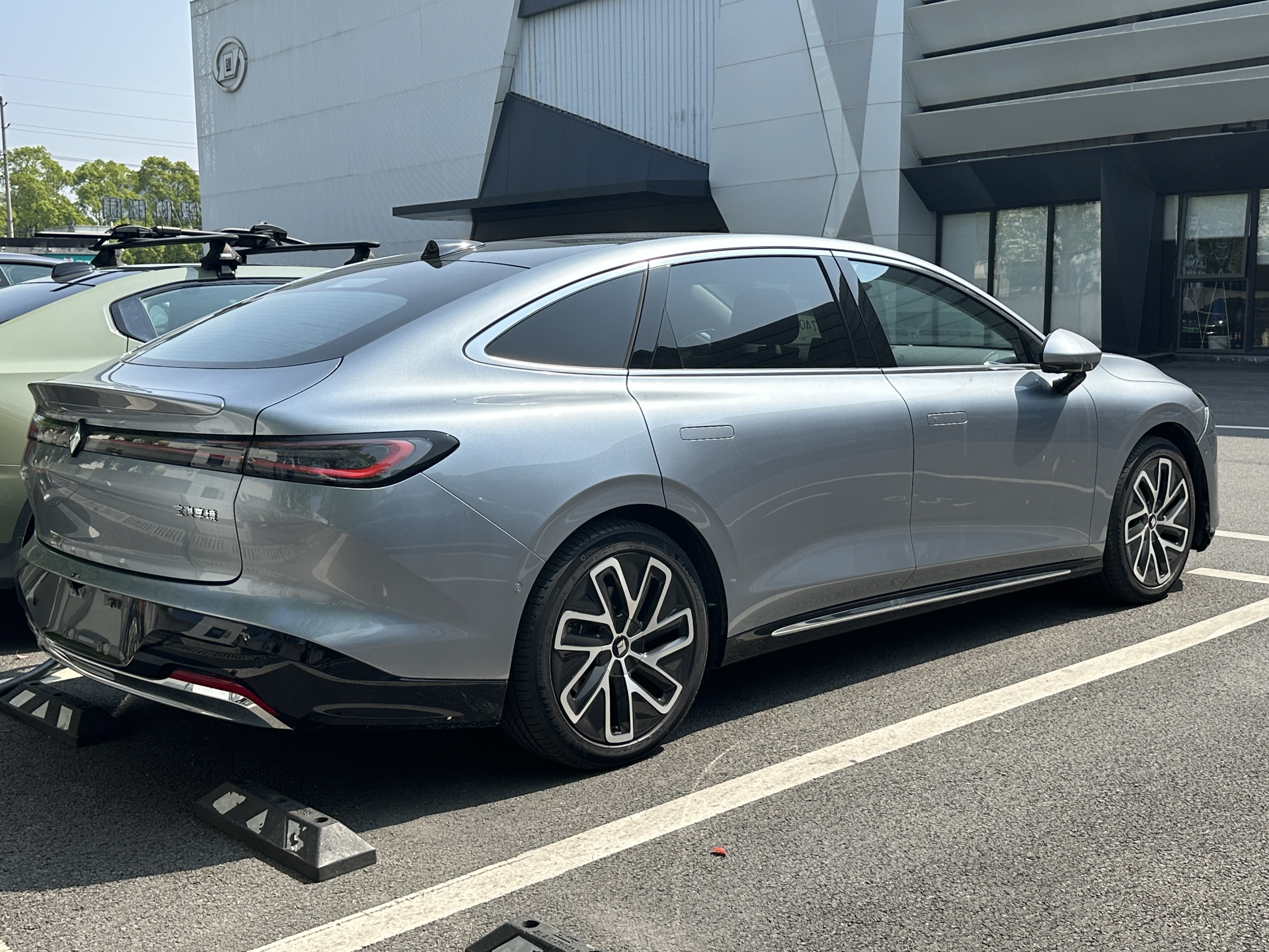
Rear view (EV)

Rear view (PHEV)

The Xiangjing was initially introduced through MIIT released photos of the Baojun Yunguang.

The Xiangjing has a 5-door fastback bodystyle and features a liftback tailgate resulting in a drag coefficient of 0.198 Cd, and the trunk has a capacity of 476 litres (17 cu ft).

== Powertrain ==
The Xiangjing is available as either a fully electric vehicle or a plug-in hybrid, which have differing front-end styling. The EV variant is powered by a front positioned electric motor developing 249 hp (186 kW; 252 PS) capable of a top speed of 170 km/h (106 mph), paired with a 69.2 kWh lithium iron phosphate battery pack supplied by Zenergy providing 600 km (373 mi) of CLTC range.

The plug-in hybrid variant is equipped with a 1.5-liter turbocharged engine producing a maximum power of 141 hp (105 kW; 143 PS) and is able to reach a maximum speed of 190 km/h (118 mph), while paired with a 20.5 kWh lithium iron phosphate battery pack weighing 180 kg (397 lb) supplied by Gotion and offers a 101 km (63 mi) CLTC pure electric range.

== Sales ==
| Year | China | | |
| Year | EV | PHEV | Total |
|---|---|---|---|
| 2025 | 1,324 | 773 | 2,097 |
