= GM Colmotores =

Colombian subsidiary of General Motors

General Motors Colmotores S.A.
- Formerly: Fábrica Colombiana de Automotores S.A. (1956–65); Colmotores-Chrysler (1965–79)
- Type: Private (1956–65); Subsidiary (1965–present)
- Industry: Automotive
- Founded: July 27, 1956; 70 years ago
- Founder: Germán Montoya Vélez
- Headquarters: Bogotá, Colombia
- Products: Automobiles, commercial vehicles
- Brands: Austin (1962-65); Dodge (1965–79); Chevrolet (1979–present)
- Number of employees: 35,000
- Parent: Chrysler (1965–79); General Motors (1979–present)
- Website: chevrolet.com.co

General Motors Colmotores S.A. is the Colombian subsidiary of General Motors. Established in 1957 as "Fábrica Colombiana de Automotores S.A." (shortened "Colmotores"), they began manufacturing Austin vehicles under license of BMC. In 1965, US-based corporation Chrysler took a 60% stake in the company, which manufactured Chrysler cars under license until 1979. In 1979, General Motors took control of the company, purchasing a 77.4% stake.

In 1981, the company was renamed "General Motors Colmotores". Since then it had manufactured, up until 2024, under license, a variety of General Motors, GM Daewoo, Isuzu, Qingling, and Suzuki vehicles for the local market, all sold under the Chevrolet brand. The company has production facilities in Colombia, Ecuador, and Venezuela, imports models from Chevrolet built by GM in the US and GM Korea built in Korea.

The company was the first automobile manufacturer in Colombia when they started to assemble cars in their factory in Bogotá in 1962. Since its establishment, Colmotores had produced nearly 1.5 million vehicles.

== History ==
The first initiative to the manufacturing of vehicles in Colombia came from the Dugand brothers who established "Dugand Hermanos & Cia. Ltda" in Barranquilla, producing some Volkswagen and Studebaker models but they had to close soon after because of the lack of money and support from the national government.

As often happens with large projects, the creation of GM Colmotores emerged from the vision of a handful of Colombian businessmen, led by Germán Montoya Vélez. After many conversations, financial calculations and had to overcome obstacles that men whose common goal was, before the trade to create a company in Colombia, were crystallized his desire: the July 27th, 1956 was founded the "Fábrica Colombiana de Automotores S.A." ("Colmotores"), whose articles of incorporation are logged a month later, on 25 August of that year, with an initial capital of five million pesos, contributed several regions, particularly Antioquia, Cundinamarca, Caldas and the Coast.

On the other hand, the Colombian government was in the process of expanding the domestic market so they promulgated a decree that exempted from income taxes, property, import and procurement of raw material to industries that used material produced in Paz del Rio steel mill for a period of ten years. The governmenbt expected that those favorable conditions would bring a group of shareholders to the region.

As the Dugan brothers did not have official licenses to manufacture automobiles in Colombia, Colmotores became the first assembler to produce officially licensed vehicles. In November 1956 Colmotores signed an agreement with British Motor Corporation to produce vehicles under the "Austin" brand. The deal stated that BMC would provide the components and Colmotores would assembled the vehicles using local autoparts and workers.

The production began operating under the chairmanship of Santiago Trujillo and general manager Germán Montoya, and its construction was completed in late 1961. By then the company had negotiations with the British Motor Corporation to assemble vehicles in Austin Colombia. Moreover, the national government the same year the production of cars in the country. The industrialists to take care of that activity were to a promising prospect, which included new incentives such as exemption from taxes on profits and assets to be devoted to the importation of necessary equipment.

In February 1962 President of Colombia Alberto Lleras Camargo inaugurated the Colmotores plant, while the auxiliary bishop of Bogotá Emilio de Brigard blessed the staff and facilities. Then began the production of vehicles, cargo trucks Austin 2.5 and 6 tons for passenger vans and campers in two versions, short and long. Four years later the company had produced nearly 4,000 commercial vehicles.

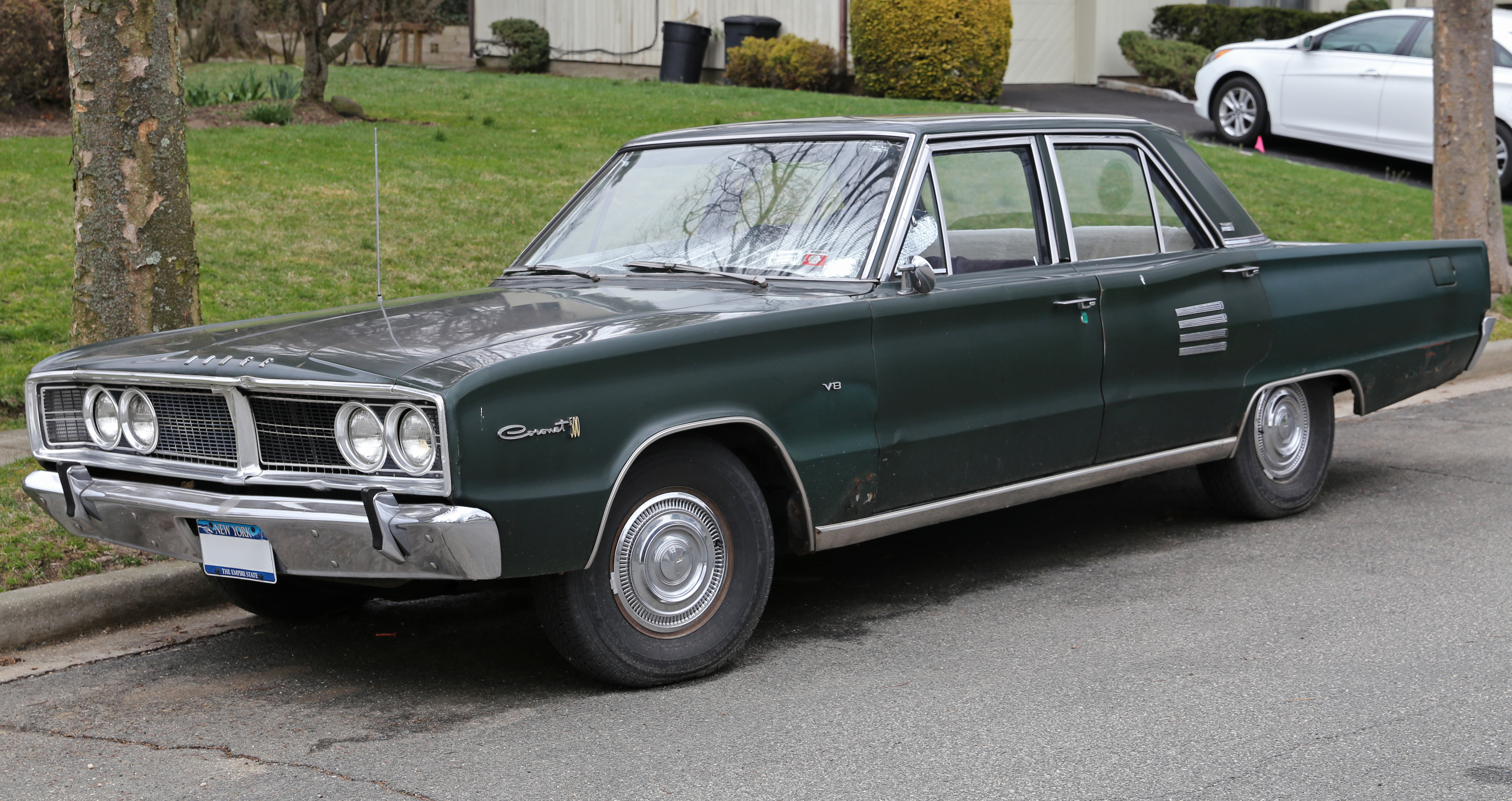
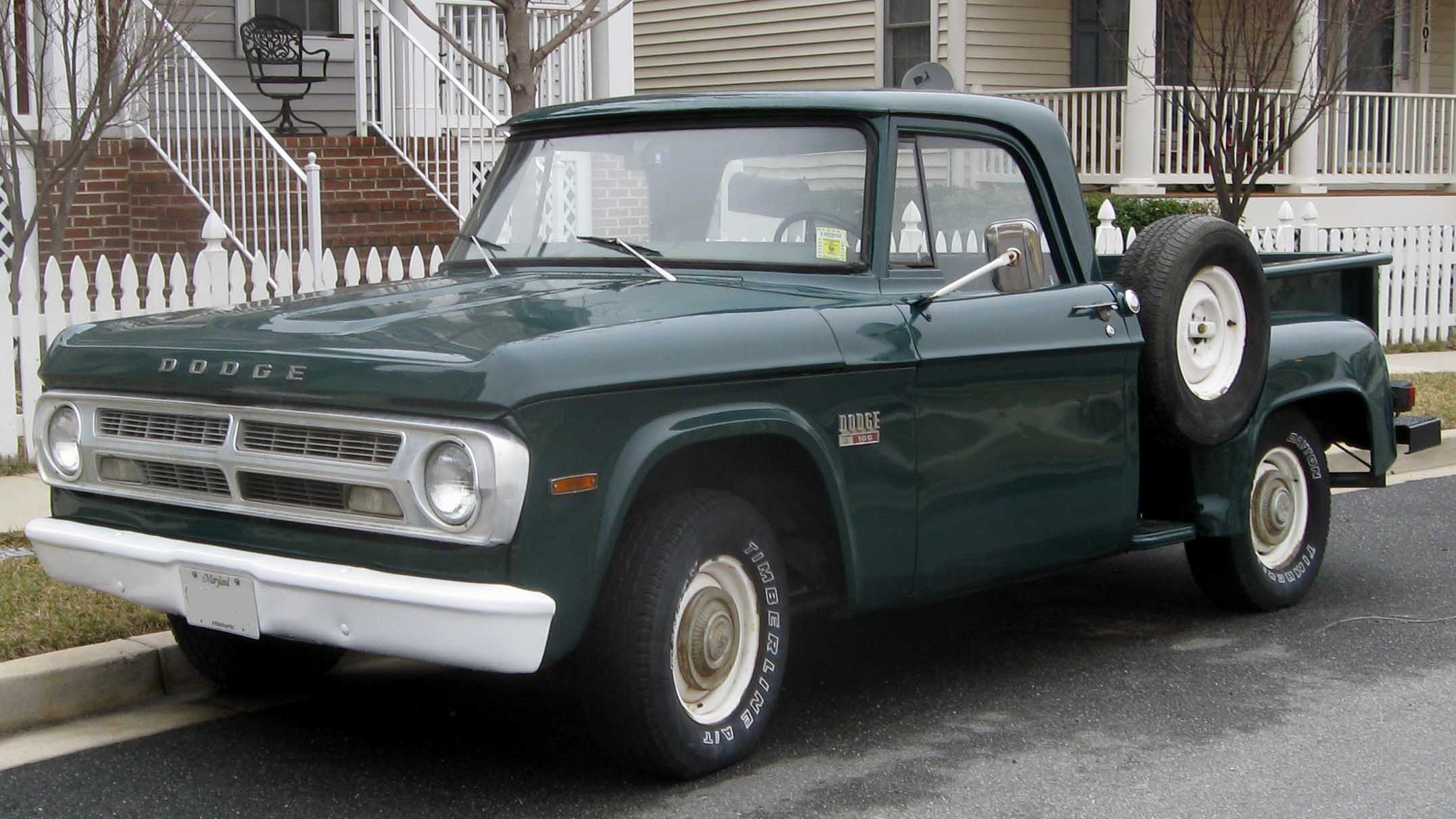
Chrysler took over Colmotores in 1965. Some models produced by Colmotores were the Dodge Coronet 400 (left) and the Dodge D-series truck (right)

Then came the changes, adjustments imposed by the challenges of developing an enterprise of great ambitions, in much quixotic. Faced, first, the failure of the government of the incentives for the automotive industry, which led, of course, financial difficulties Colmotores shareholders. In 1965, the international Chrysler company acquired 60% of the shares of Colmotores, the company began calling "Colmotores-Chrysler", and the following year began the manufacture and sale of Dodge and Simca cars, and appeared in the domestic market the first car produced in Colombia, the Coronet 440 and Dodge D series trucks of 1-7 tons. Other Dodge models commercialised were the Alpine (Simca 1307) and Polara.

Fourteen years would last the permanence of Chrysler in Colombia. But in 1973 the oil crisis came, which affected the world economy and forced to take further decisions on exploration and consumption. It was created to organize producers and exporters of oil, OPEC, and the automotive industry introduced the use of the compact car's engine light and low power consumption.

Chrysler had extreme financial difficulties that led it to reduce its international operations to focus on North America. The Colombia and Venezuela operations were acquired by General Motors in 1979 when the company took over the shares previously owned by Colmotores Chrysler International.

At the time when General Motors purchased the plant in the country, Colmotores merged the Presidency and the Directorate-Management on a single charge, which took Germán Montoya Vélez until 1983. The word "Chrysler" was suppressed from its name to return to his original name, 'Fábrica Colombiana de Automotores S.A.' (Colmotores). In 1991, it became "General Motors Colmotores S.A.", which has remained since.

Since the company was taken over by GM, by 2016 Colmotores had assembled 45 vehicle versions in 12 different platforms, consolidating one of the largest companies in Colombia, with 1,300 direct and 16,000 indirect employees. In 2015, the company produced a total of 49,425 vehicles.

On April 26, 2024, General Motors announced they would close down their Colmotores factory alongside their OBB factory in Ecuador. This was due to the downfall of the Colombian auto industry, alongside high inflation and interest rates, with their factory barely active at 9%

== Brands ==
List of brands produced and commercialised by Colmotores through the years:

Period	Owner	Brands
1956–65	BMC	Austin
1965–79	Chrysler	Dodge (Note: Apart from original Dodge models, the company produced Simca rebranded models.)
1979–2024	General Motors	Chevrolet (Note: Apart from original Chevrolet models, the company produces/have produced Suzuki, Daewoo, Opel, Wuling, and Isuzu rebranded models.)

== Models ==
Vehicle models produced and/or commercialised by Colmotores since it was taken over by General Motors. All of them under the "Chevrolet" brand:

=== Assembled ===
- Joy (Hatchback and Sedan)
- Alto
- Aveo Family (4-door sedan)
- Aveo Emotion (T250 Sedan & hatchback)
- Beat
- Cobalt
- Cruze
- Monza
- Optra Advance (Sedan)
- Sail (Hatchback and Sedan)
- Spark (2nd gen)
- Spark GT (3rd gen)
- Sprint (hatchback 3 and 5 doors)
- Swift (sedan and hatchback)
- Vitara

==== Imported ====
- Camaro SS
- Cruze (Sedan & Hatchback)
- Equinox
- Onix
- Sonic (Sedan & Hatchback)
- Tracker
- Traverse
- Trailblazer
- Tahoe
- Malibu (2019-2020 Model)
- Cavalier (2018)
- Colorado

=== Commercial vehicles ===
==== Assembled ====
- NHR (light truck, minibus)
- NPR
- Chevrolet Taxi 7:24 (1st gen)

==== Imported ====
- FRR
- FTR
- FVR / FVZ / EXR
- CYZ
- P430
- LUV D-Max
- N200 (Cargo and Passenger)
- N300 (Cargo and Passenger)
- N400 (Cargo and Passenger)
