= Chevrolet Lova RV =

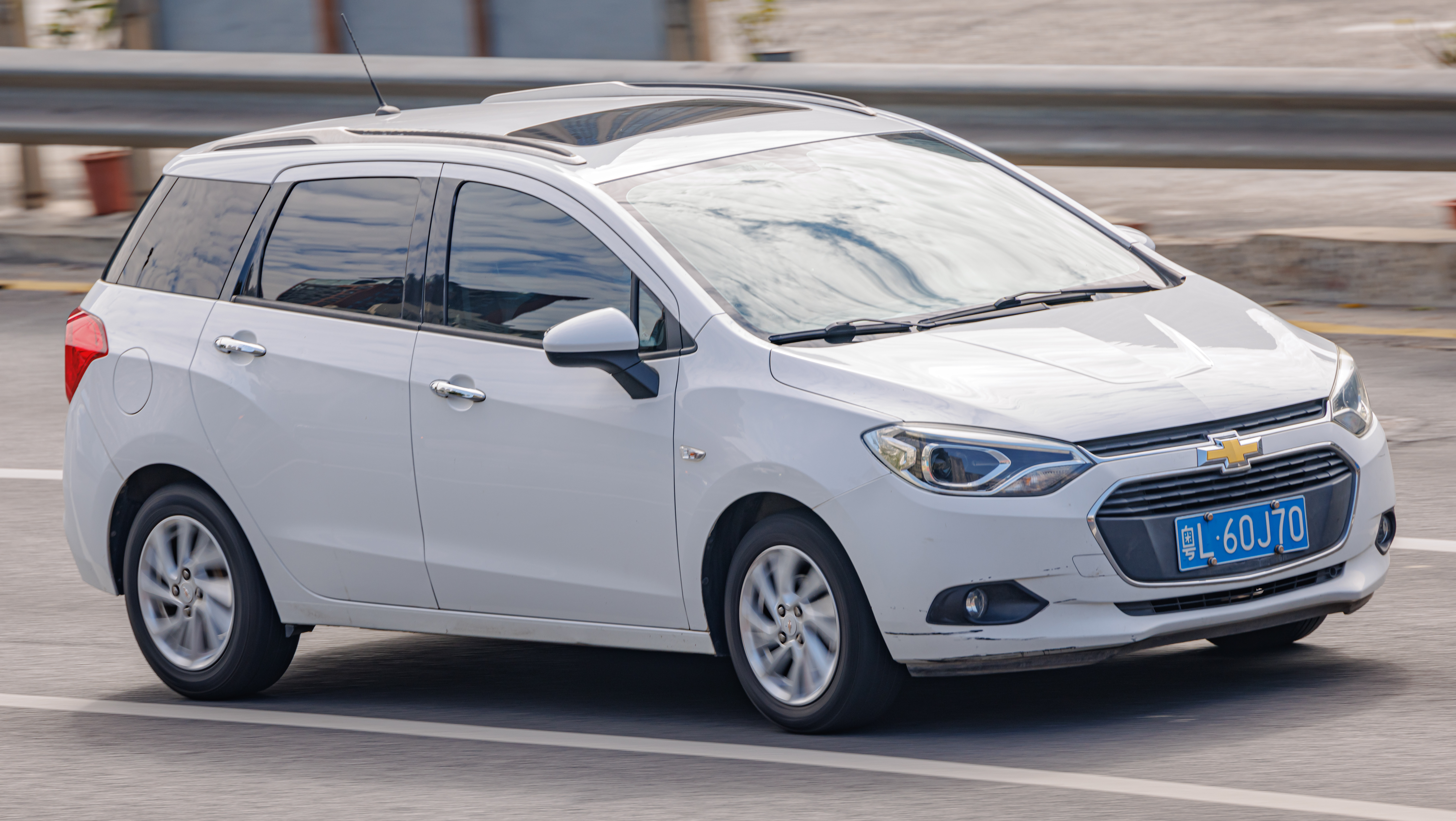

Overview
- Manufacturer: General Motors
- Production: 2016–2019
- Assembly: China: Yantai, Shandong (SAIC-GM)

Body and chassis
- Class: Compact MPV
- Body style: 5-door wagon
- Layout: Front-engine, front-wheel drive
- Related: Chevrolet Sail

Powertrain
- Engine: Petrol: 1.5 L S-TEC III I4
- Transmission: 5-speed manual 4-speed automatic

Dimensions
- Wheelbase: 2,550 mm (100.4 in)
- Length: 4,205 mm (165.6 in)
- Width: 1,722 mm (67.8 in)
- Height: 1,525 mm (60.0 in)
- Curb weight: 1,103–1,135 kg (2,432–2,502 lb)

Chronology
- Successor: Chevrolet Orlando

The Chevrolet Lova RV is a mini MPV produced by SAIC-GM, a joint venture between General Motors and SAIC Motor. Launched in 2016, the Lova RV was sold exclusively in a five-seat version. It was based on the third generation Chevrolet Sail and was discontinued in 2019.

== Overview ==
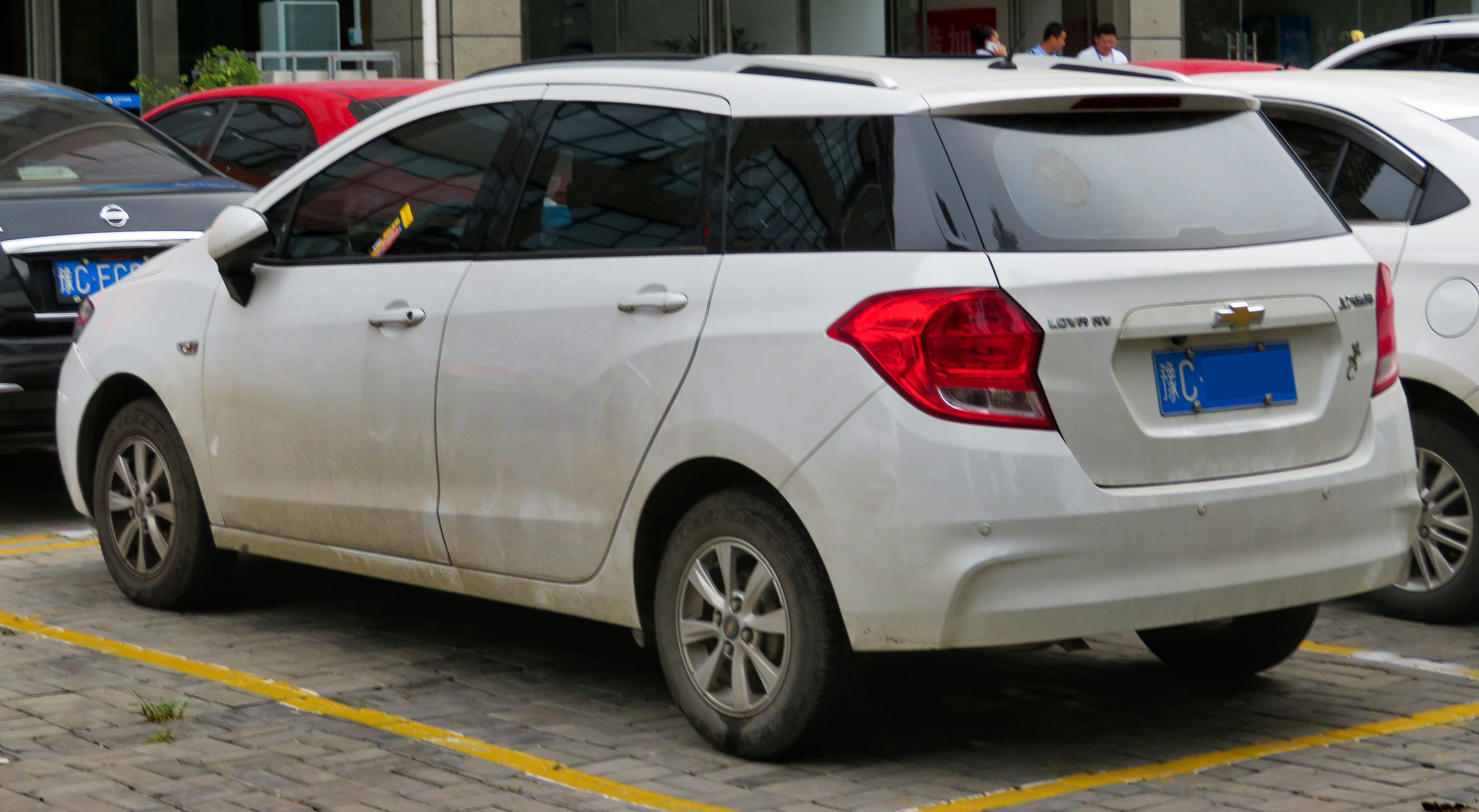
Chevrolet Lova RV rear

The Lova RV targets middle-class Chinese families and couples not interested in a subcompact SUV, and as such will slot above the Sail Sedan, and below family-oriented SUVs (such as the Captiva) in terms of pricing. Most of its competition will include domestic MPVs of a similar size, such as the Changan Eulove.

The Lova RV's family-friendly design combines a fascia that conforms to current Chevrolet design norms, thin pillars for enhanced visibility, and mid-range materials and GM technologies in the interior. Unlike many MPVs sold in China, the Lova RV is generously equipped with safety features, with dual airbags standard even on the base trim (LS).

== Specifications ==
The Lova RV is powered by a sole 1.5-liter inline-four, which is transversely mounted, and powers the front wheels. A choice of a 5-speed manual or 4-speed shiftable automatic transmission is offered on the LS, while the higher LT and LTZ trims get the automatic transmission as standard. Both powertrain versions fulfill the China-V emissions norm.

All versions of the Lova RV feature MacPherson front suspension and dependent torsion bar rear suspension, along with front disk brakes and rear drum brakes. This is a common way to reduce costs in this vehicle class. Fuel consumption is quoted at 5.6 L/100 km, or 42 mpg.

=== Trim levels ===
There are three trim levels available for the Lova RV: base LS, mid-range LT, and range-topping LTZ.
