= Chevrolet Sail =

Subcompact car produced by SAIC-GM

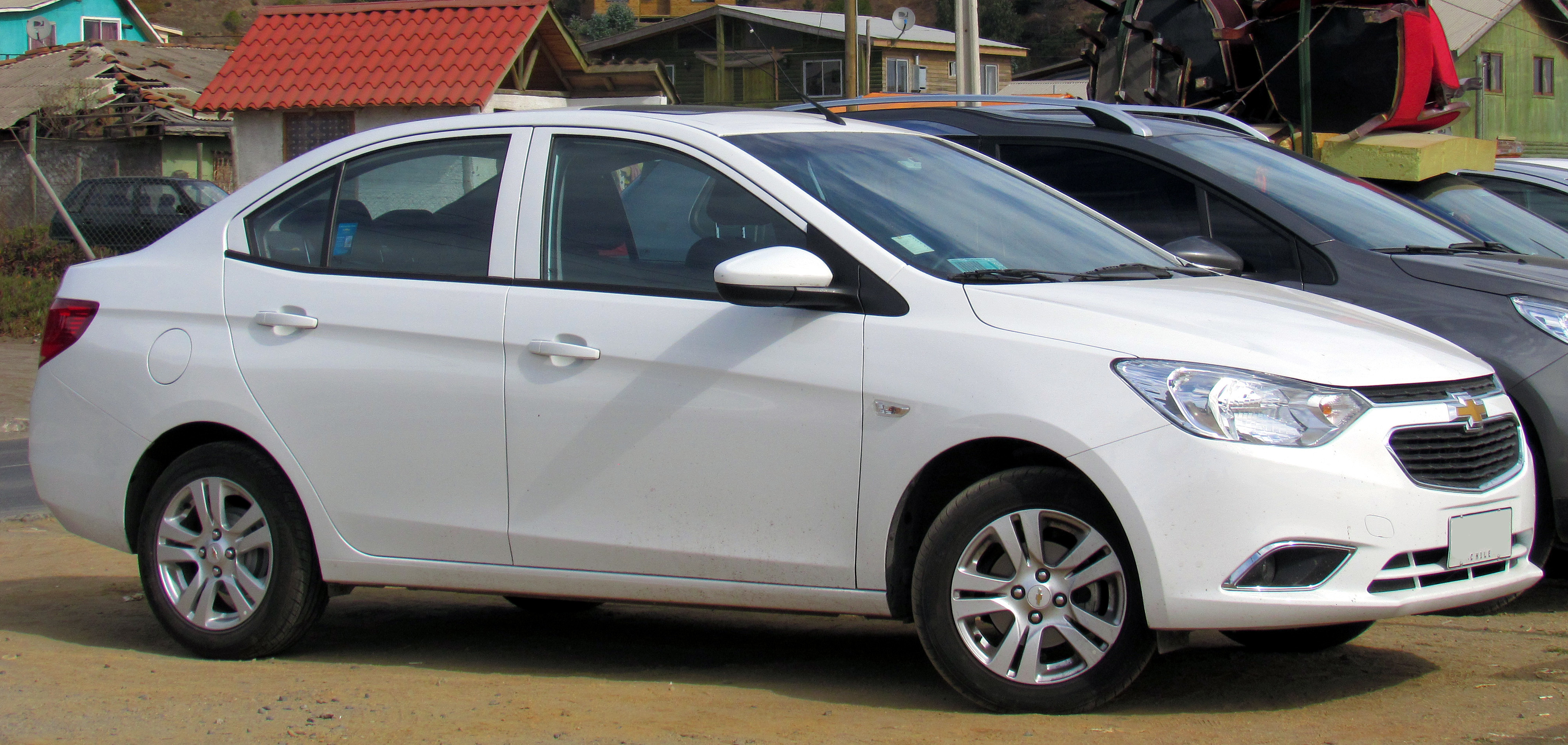
- 2016 Chevrolet Sail sedan (Chile)

Overview
- Manufacturer: SAIC-GM
- Also called: Buick Sail (2000–2005); Chevrolet Aveo (2017–present)
- Production: 2000–present
- Model years: 2001–present

Body and chassis
- Class: Subcompact car
- Layout: Front-engine, front-wheel-drive

Chronology
- Successor: Chevrolet Aveo (310C)

The Chevrolet Sail (Chinese: 雪佛兰赛欧; pinyin: Xuěfúlán Sài'ōu) is a subcompact car produced by SAIC-GM, a joint venture of General Motors in China. Launched in 2001, it was sold as the Buick Sail in China, both in sedan and wagon form based on Opel Corsa B. Following the reintroduction of the Chevrolet brand in China in 2005, the car received a facelift, and its name was changed to "Chevrolet Sail" and "Sail SRV".

In 2010, the Sail was completely redesigned, it was fully developed by SAIC-GM and offered sedan and hatchback variations. Exports began in Chile and Peru; they have also been assembled in Ecuador, and other developing countries in North Africa and the Middle East. Starting from 2013, it is manufactured by GM Colmotores in Bogotá, Colombia, for domestic and regional markets.

The third generation model made its debut in November 2014 at the Guangzhou Auto Show. It was discontinued in China in 2019, although production continues for export markets.

== First generation (2000) ==
First generation
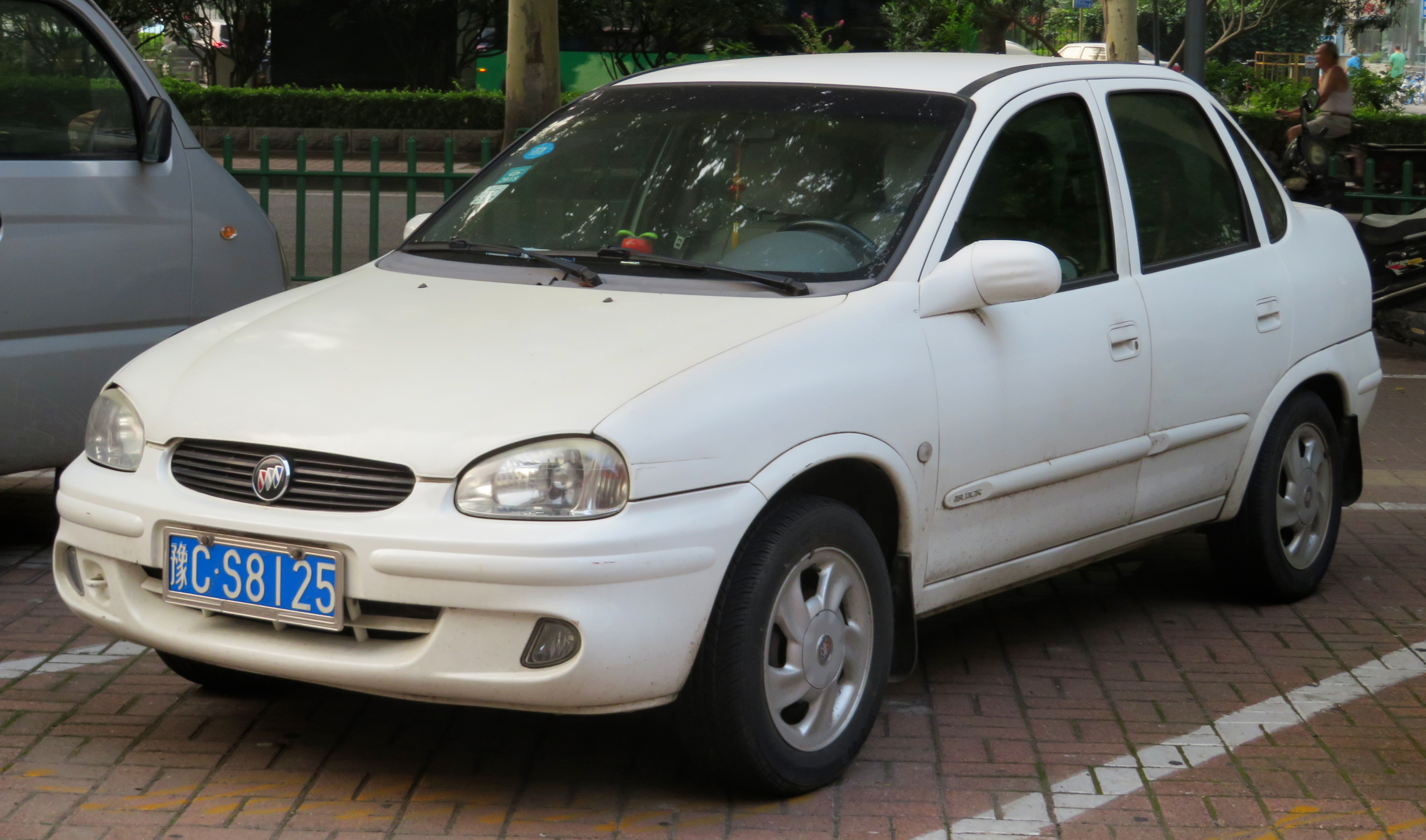
- Buick Sail (2001–2004)

Overview
- Also called: Buick Sail (2000–2005); Jilin Jiangbei Meilu JJ7090; Wuling LZW5020XYZD (postal van, rebadged Shanghai Auto Saibao SAC6420); Chevrolet Corsa Plus (Chile); Chevrolet Classic (Latin America); Chevrolet Chevy (Mexico)
- Production: 2000–2009; 2009–2016 (Chevrolet Classic)
- Model years: 2001–2004 (Buick Sail); 2005–2009 (Chevrolet Sail); 2006–2009 (Chevrolet Corsa Plus); 2010–2016 (Chevrolet Classic)
- Assembly: China: Pudong, Shanghai (2000–2003); Yantai, Shandong (2003–2009) (Shanghai GM); Argentina: Alvear (GM Argentina); Brazil: São Caetano do Sul (GM Brazil)
- Designer: James C. Shyr (2003; exterior and interior)

Body and chassis
- Body style: 4-door saloon 5 door estate
- Related: Opel Corsa B

Powertrain
- Engine: 1.2 L LMU I4 (petrol); 1.4 L LCU I4 (petrol); 1.6 L BPR6EY I4 (petrol)
- Transmission: 5-speed manual 5-speed automatic 4-speed automatic

Dimensions
- Wheelbase: 2,500 mm (98.4 in)
- Length: 4,300 mm (169.3 in)
- Width: 1,735 mm (68.3 in)
- Height: 1,504 mm (59.2 in)

=== Buick Sail ===
On 12 December 2000, the first Chinese-made Buick rolled off the production line as part of trial production. Series production commenced in June 2001. This car was the first compact car produced by the SAIC-GM joint-venture, and was aimed squarely at young families. The Buick Sail was based on the Opel Corsa B, and the body design is shared with the Brazilian Chevrolet Corsa Classic and India's Opel Corsa Joy. This four-door saloon bodywork was never offered in Europe, instead being intended for developing markets. The only engine choice is a 1.6-litre, 92 PS (68 kW) inline-four engine, coupled to a five-speed manual transmission. The price was under 100,000 RMB. The car went on sale in June 2001. The original Opel Corsa B had also been "assembled" in Guangdong province as the Jilin Jiangbei Meilu JJ7090 from 1993 to 1996. Around 2000 cars were imported nearly complete to fit certain legal loopholes which existed at the time and sold with Jilin Jiangbei badging.

In December 2001, the wagon version, Buick Sail S-RV, was also introduced to the Chinese consumers. Basically this vehicle is also a body variation of the Opel Corsa B. The engine is the same as the Sail sedan. In June 2002, SAIC subsidiary SAIC-Yizheng introduced a locally-built version of the Corsa-based Opel Combo van as the Shanghai Auto (Shangqi) Saibao SAC6420 (上汽赛宝). Equipped with the same 1.6-litre engine and five-speed manual transmission as the Buick Sail (albeit only with 90 PS or 66 kW), it was produced in fairly small numbers (2,053 cars in 2004, for instance) until 2005. "Saibao" has sometimes been anglicized as "Sabre". There was also a Saibao DeLuxe version available, with alloy wheels and other extras. The Saibao could reach 160 km/h (99 mph).

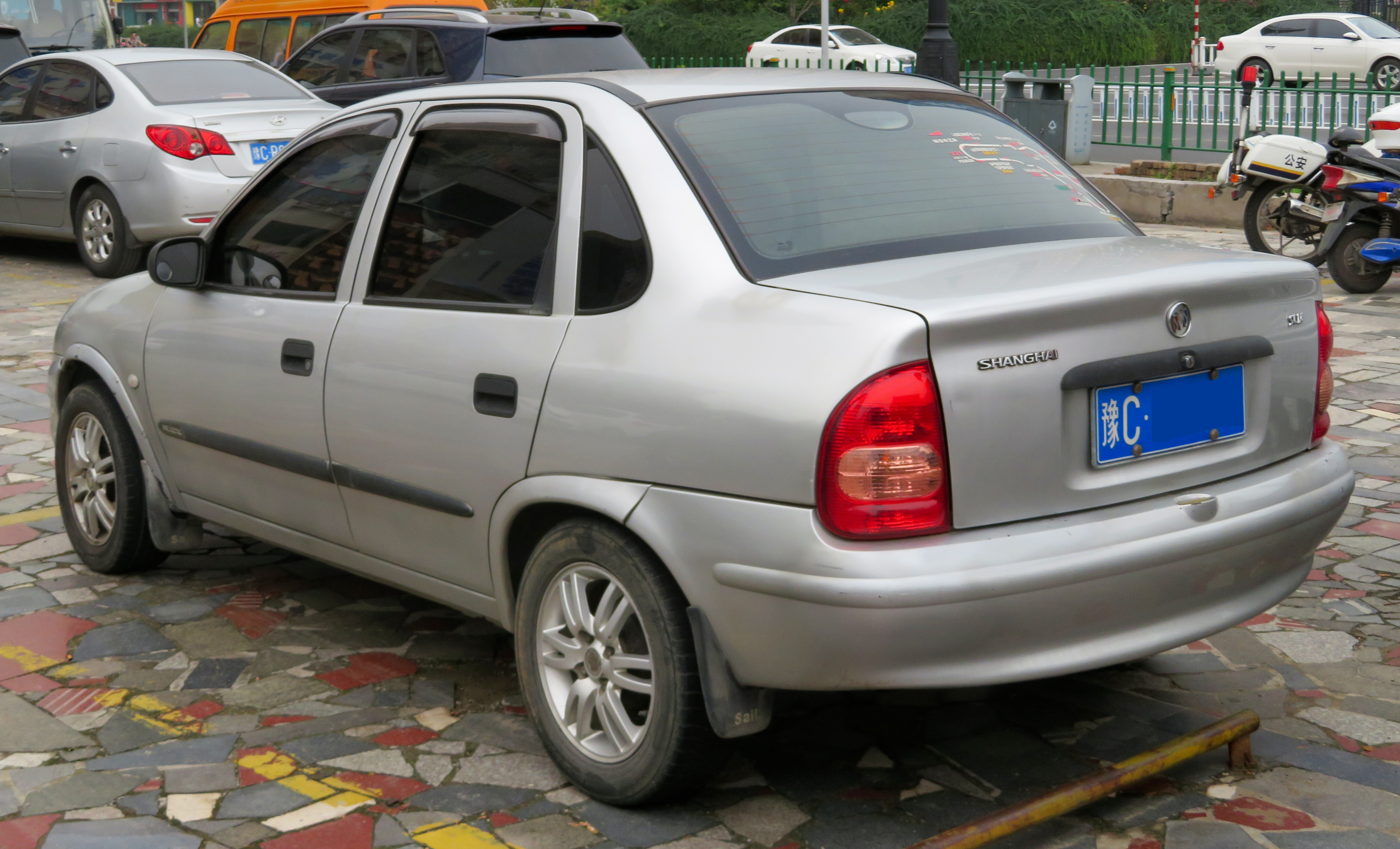
Buick Sail (2001–2004)

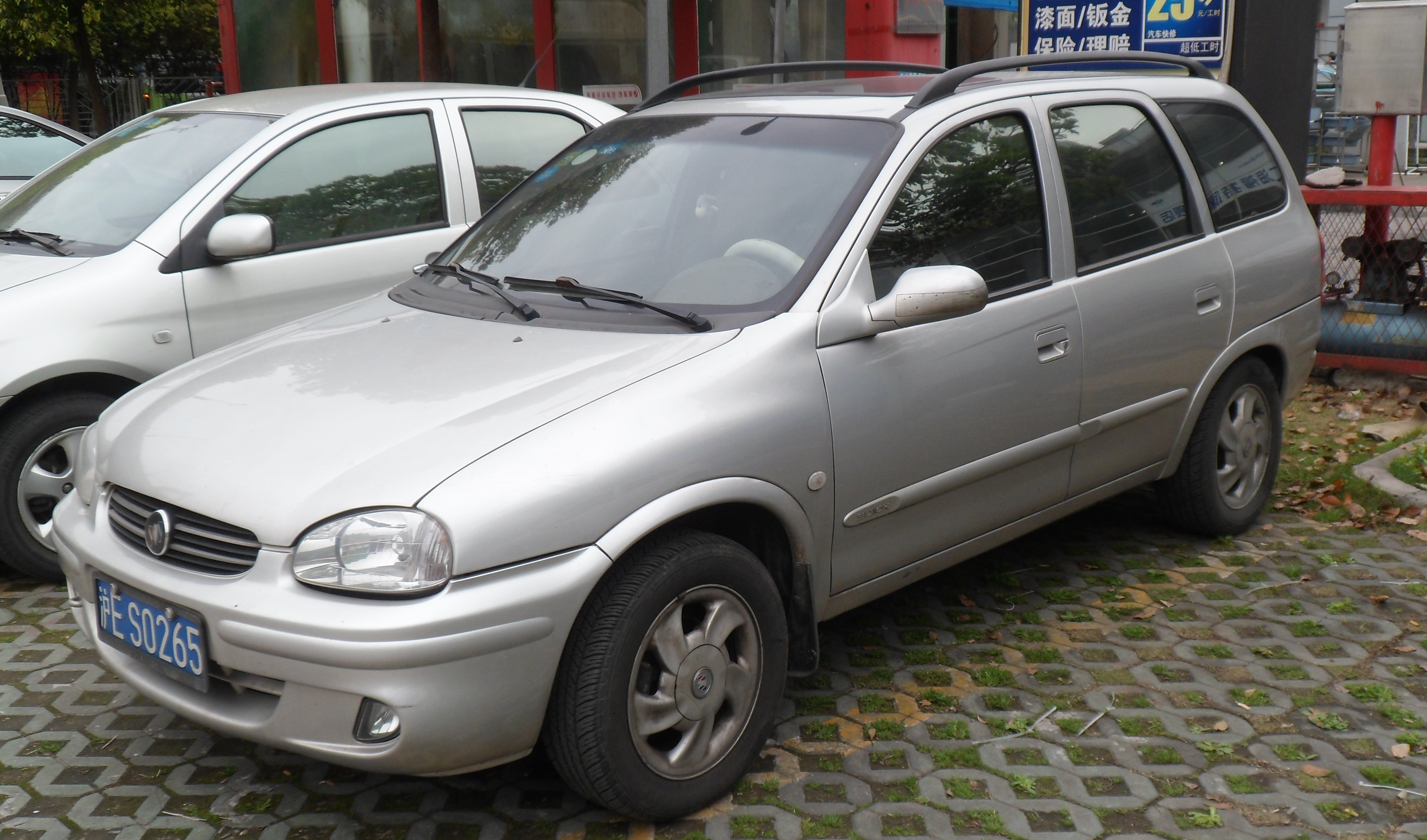
Buick Sail S-RV (2001–2004)

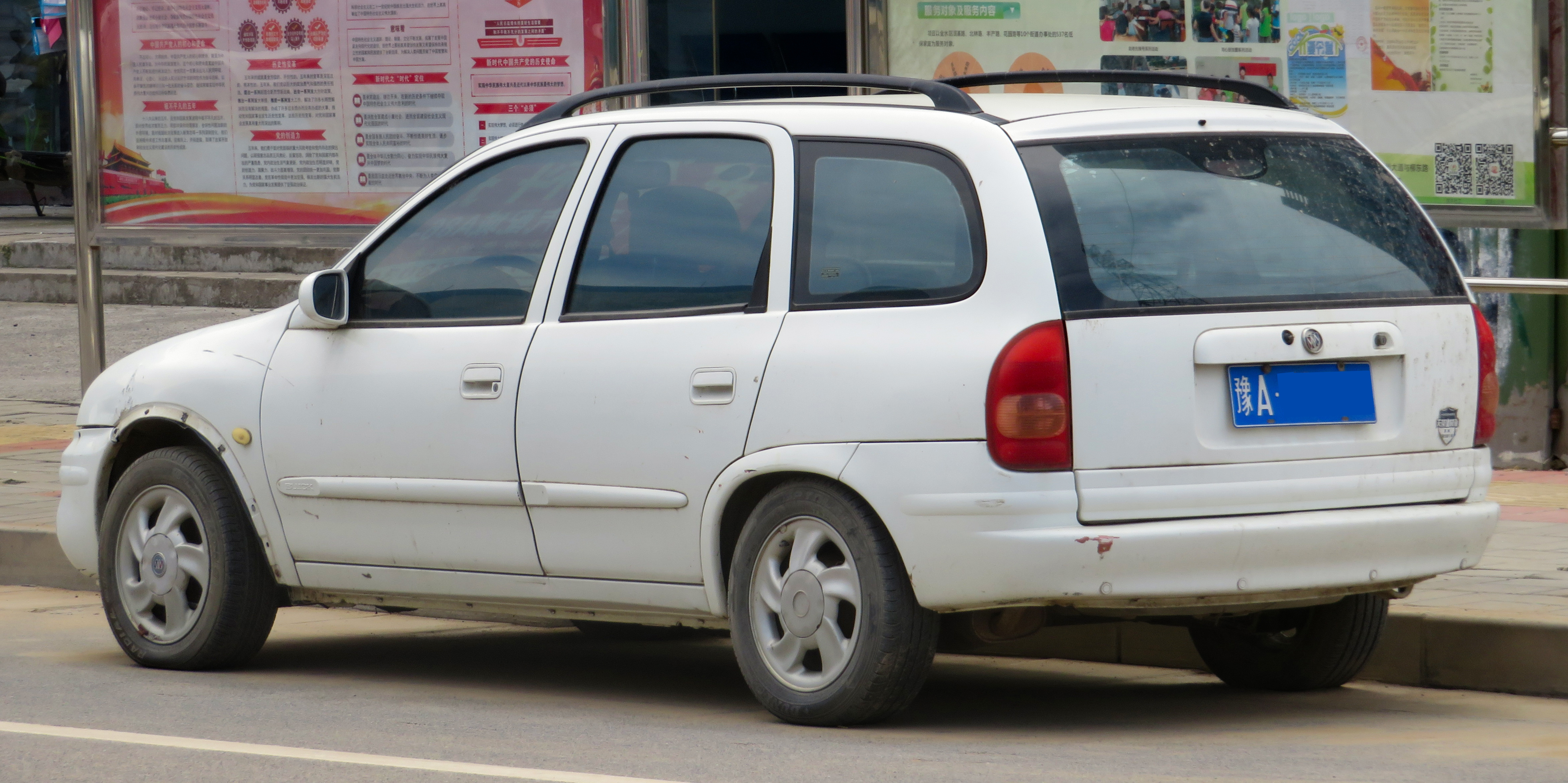
Buick Sail S-RV (2001–2004)

Shanghai Auto Saibao SAC6420

=== Chevrolet Sail ===
In February 2005, the Chevrolet brand was re-introduced to China after the failure of the Jinbei-GM joint venture, where it was described as a "younger" brand than Buick. As part of an endeavour to redefine the brand image of Buick, the Sail became the first Shanghai GM-built Chevrolet passenger car. The Chevrolet Sail (codename: SGM7165) received a locally upgraded design (new codename: SGM7166). The interior was also refined. Both the sedan and wagon forms were kept, although production of the Saibao Van ended. While sharing the original's wheelbase, the new wagon version (at 4,097 mm) is 71 mm longer than the old one's 4,026 mm. The 90 PS (66 kW), 1.6-litre engine option remained unchanged, while the transmission options originally were limited to a five-speed manual but were later joined by a four-speed automatic. Claimed top speed for the manual versions is 177 km/h (110 mph).

In the autumn of 2006, the Chevrolet Sail was exported to Chile as the Chevrolet Corsa Plus. The Corsa Plus includes dual front airbags, anti-lock brakes, air conditioning, electric windows and central locking as standard equipment.

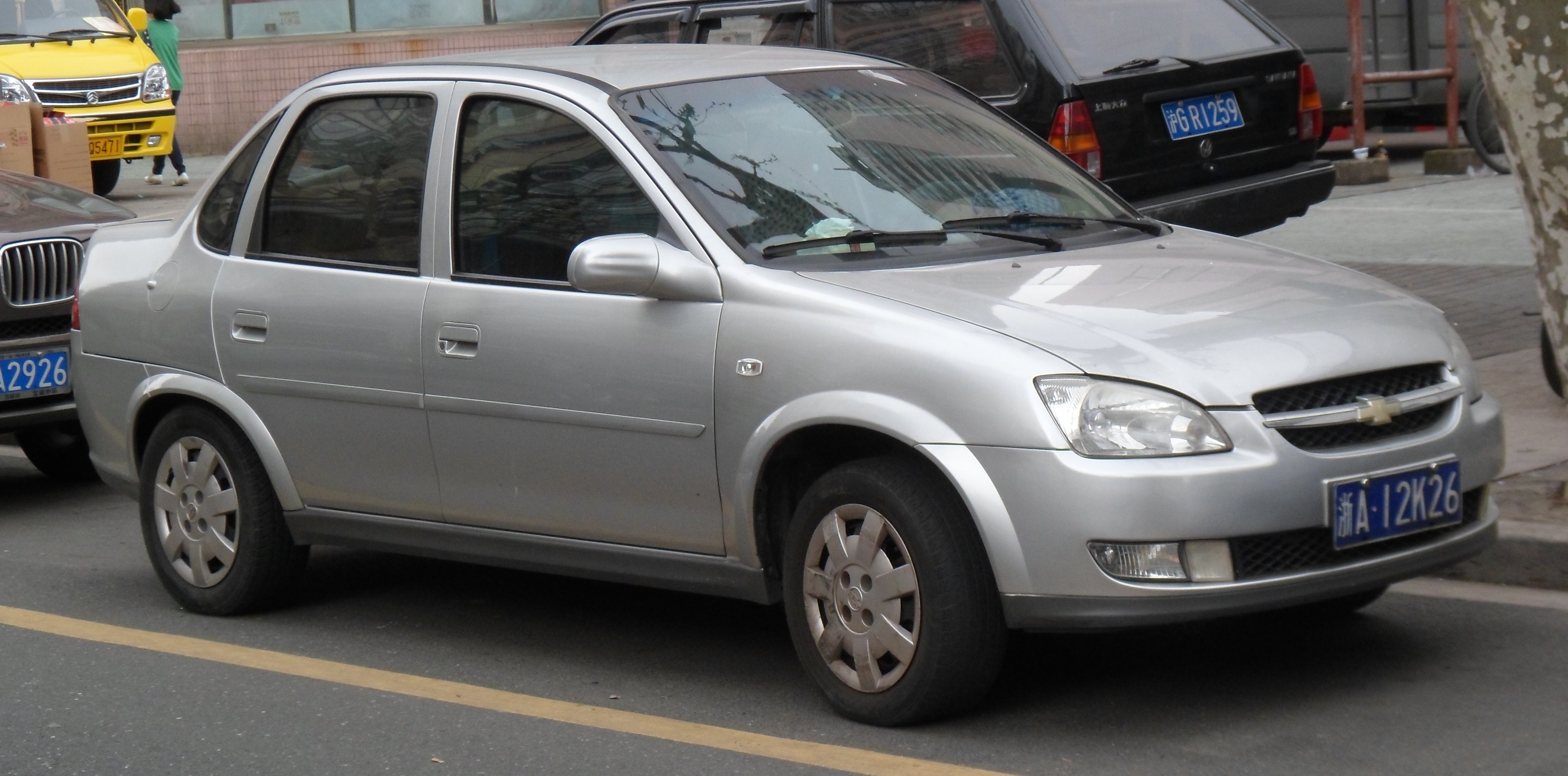
Chevrolet Sail (China)

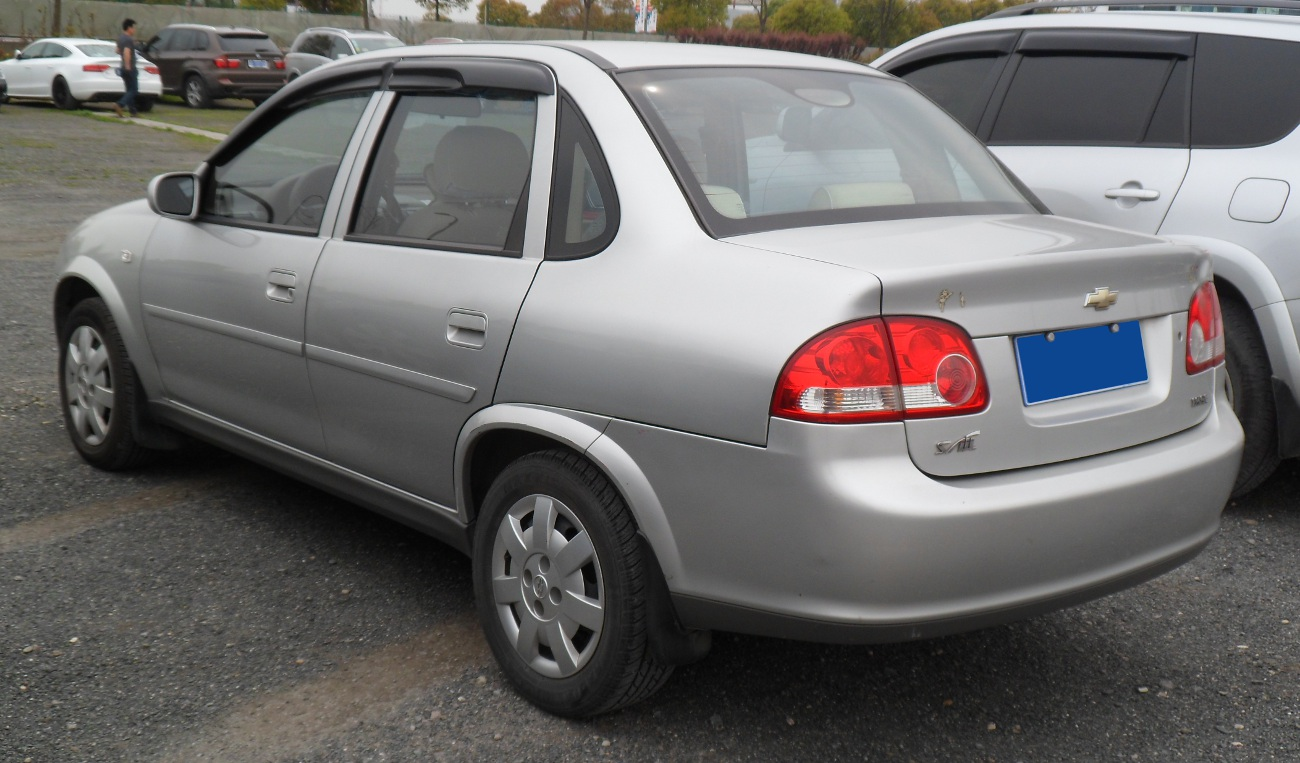
Chevrolet Sail (rear)

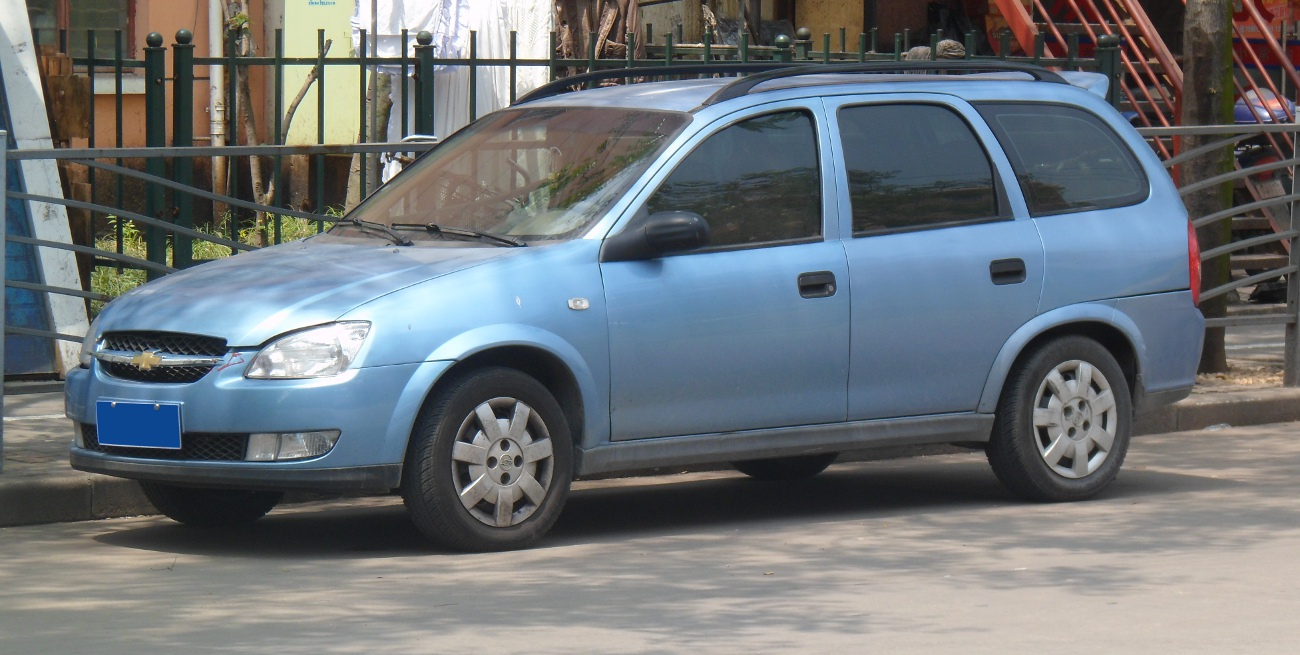
Chevrolet Sail wagon

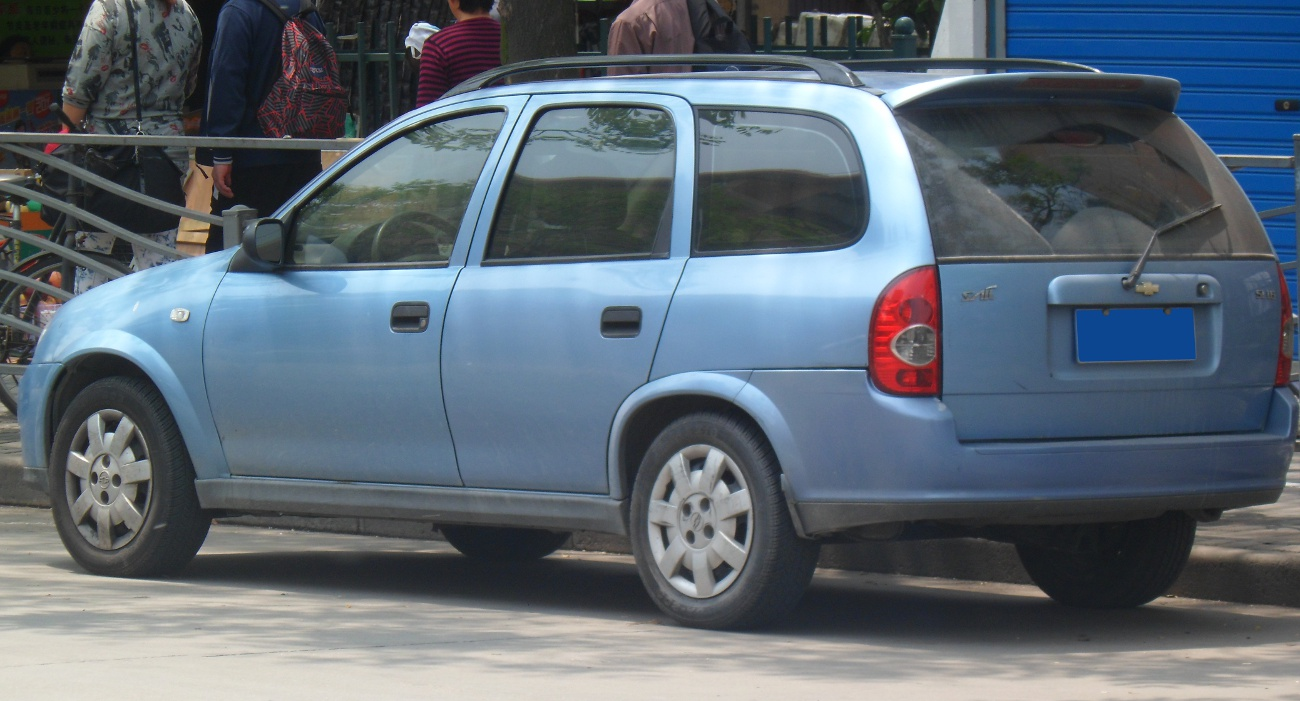
Chevrolet Sail wagon (rear)

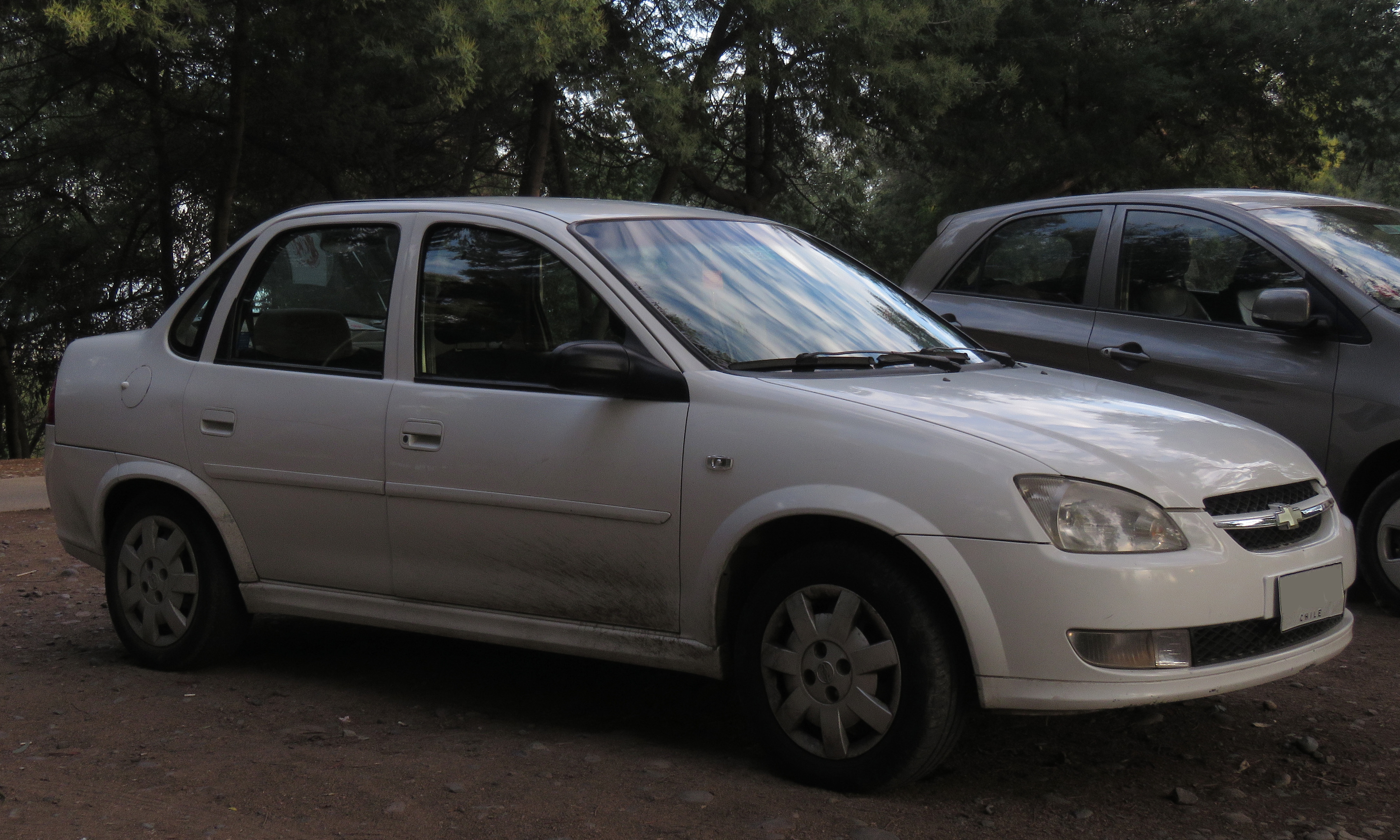
Chevrolet Corsa Plus (Chile)

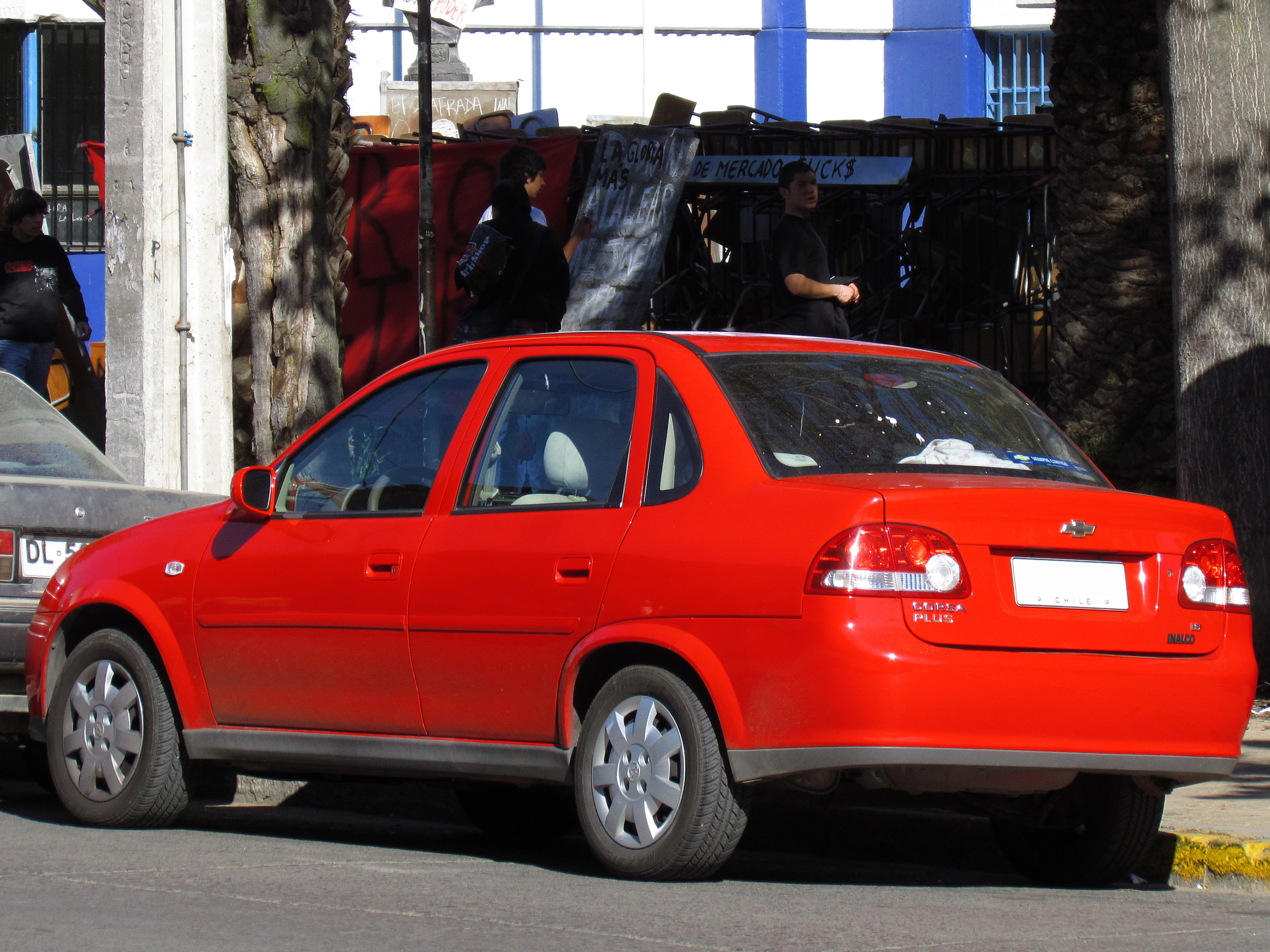
Chevrolet Corsa Plus (rear)

=== Chevrolet Classic ===
The production at Shanghai-GM ceased at the beginning of 2009, but at the same time the Chevrolet Classic and its wagon version Chevrolet Classic SW adopted the design of the Chevrolet Sail and were released in Latin America as the 2010 model year. The sedan version has been produced in Argentina until October 2016, but it was equipped with different engines. In Argentina, the Classic was powered by a 1.4 L 8V 69 kW (94 PS) engine. The model offered in Brazil had a 1.0-litre Flexpower engine, of which the output is 56.7 kW (77 PS) when fueled with petrol, or 57.4 kW (78 PS) with alcohol.

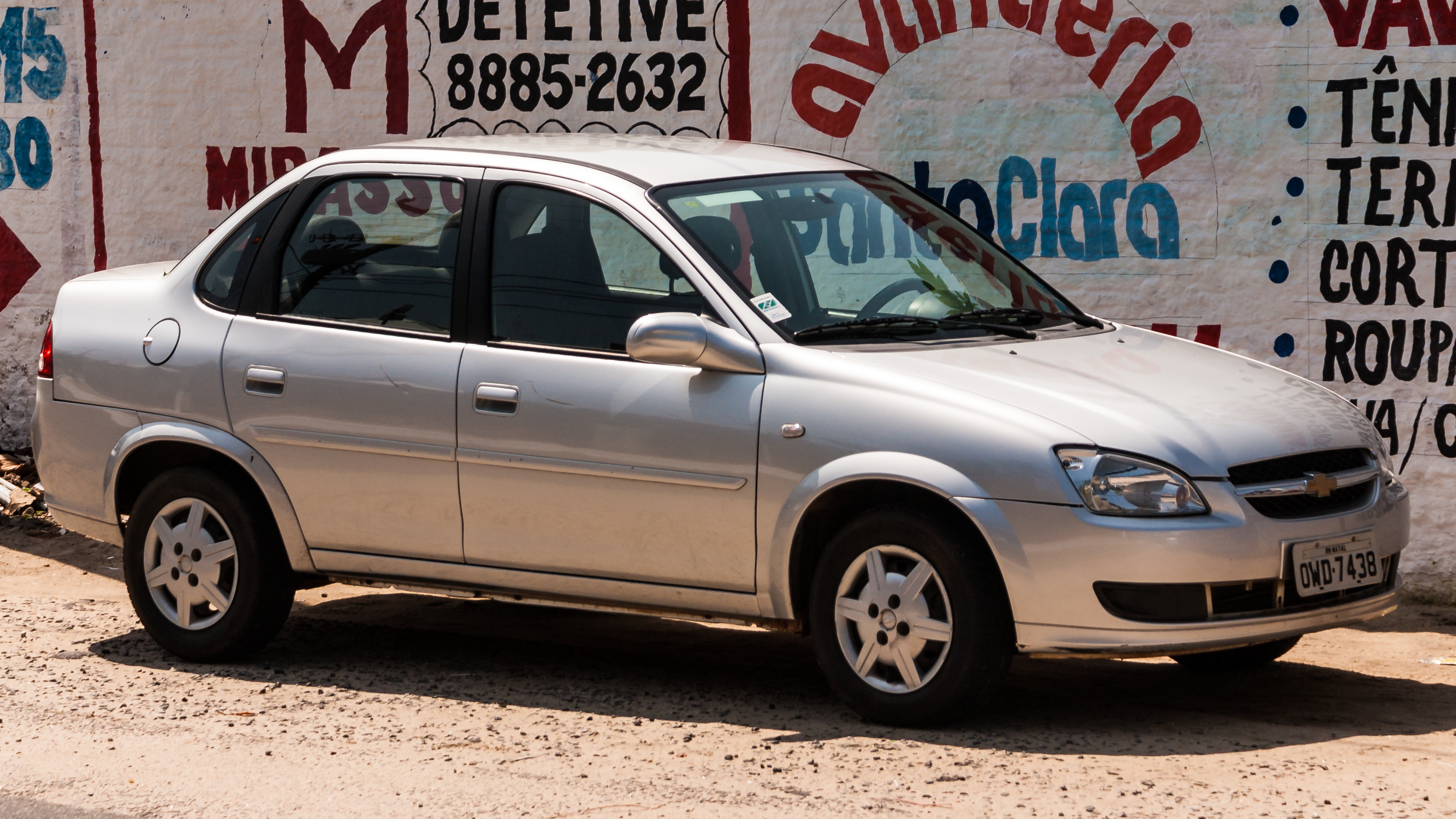
Chevrolet Classic

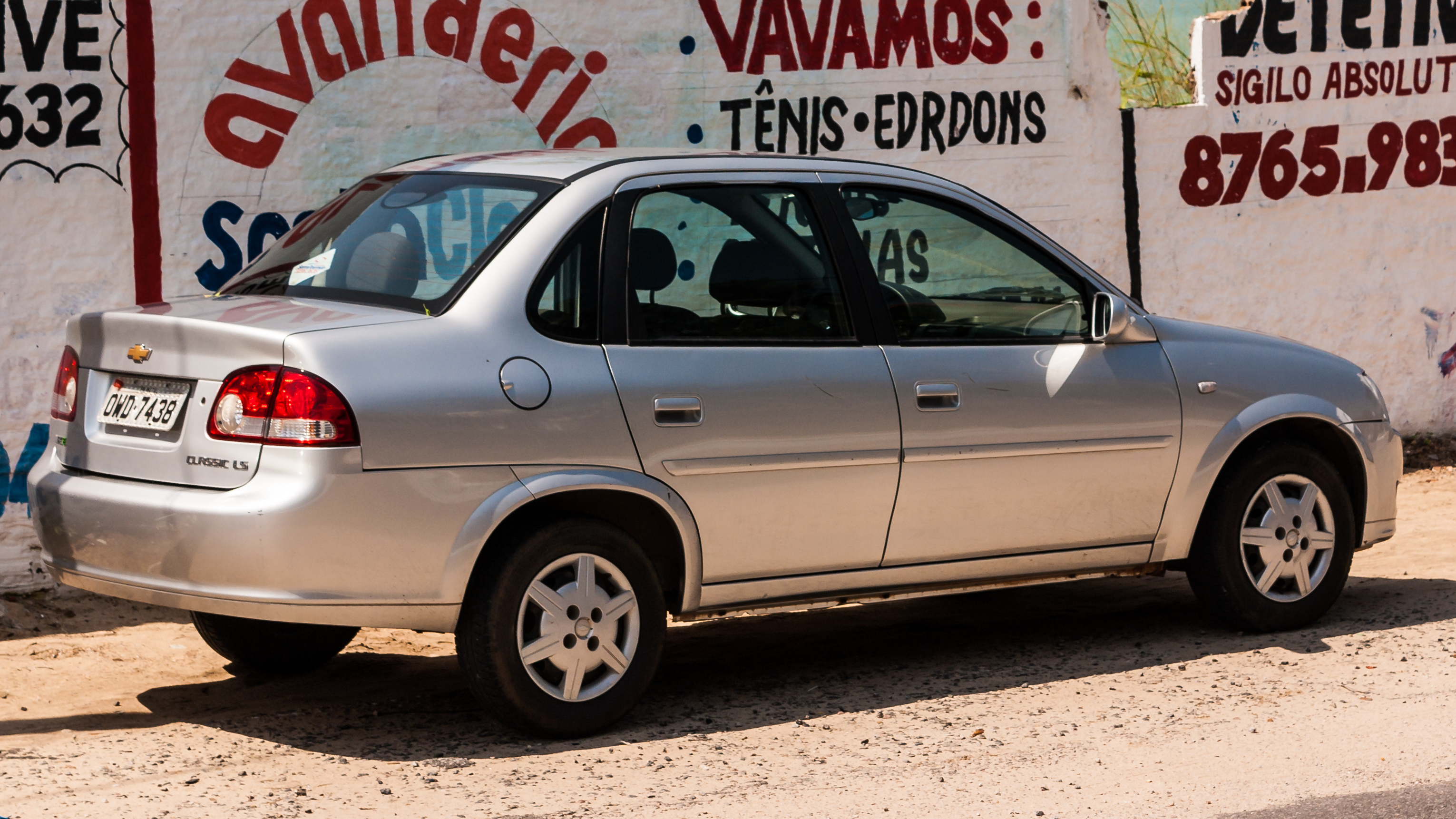
Chevrolet Classic (rear)

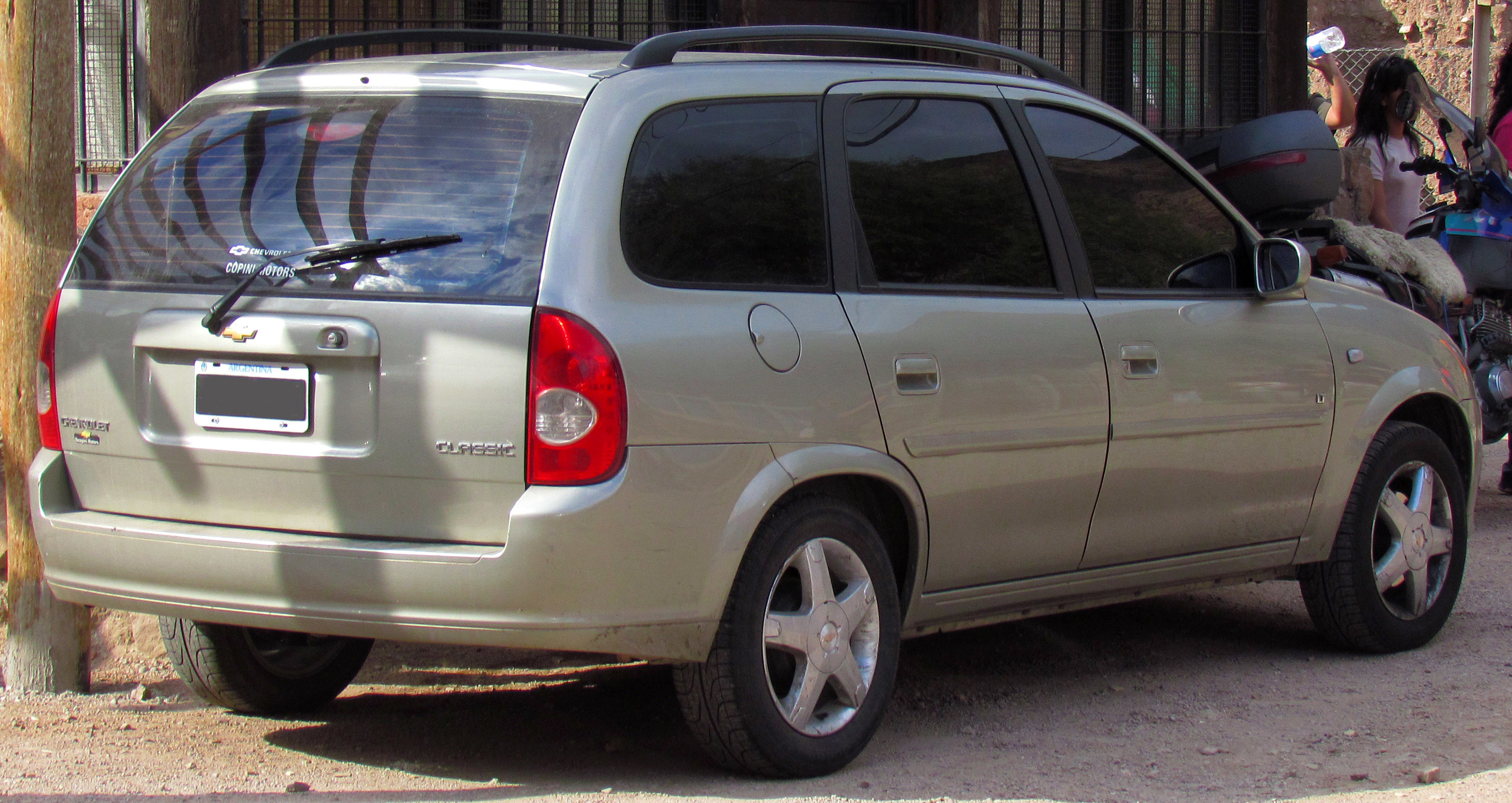
Chevrolet Classic SW (rear)

== Second generation (2010) ==
Second generation
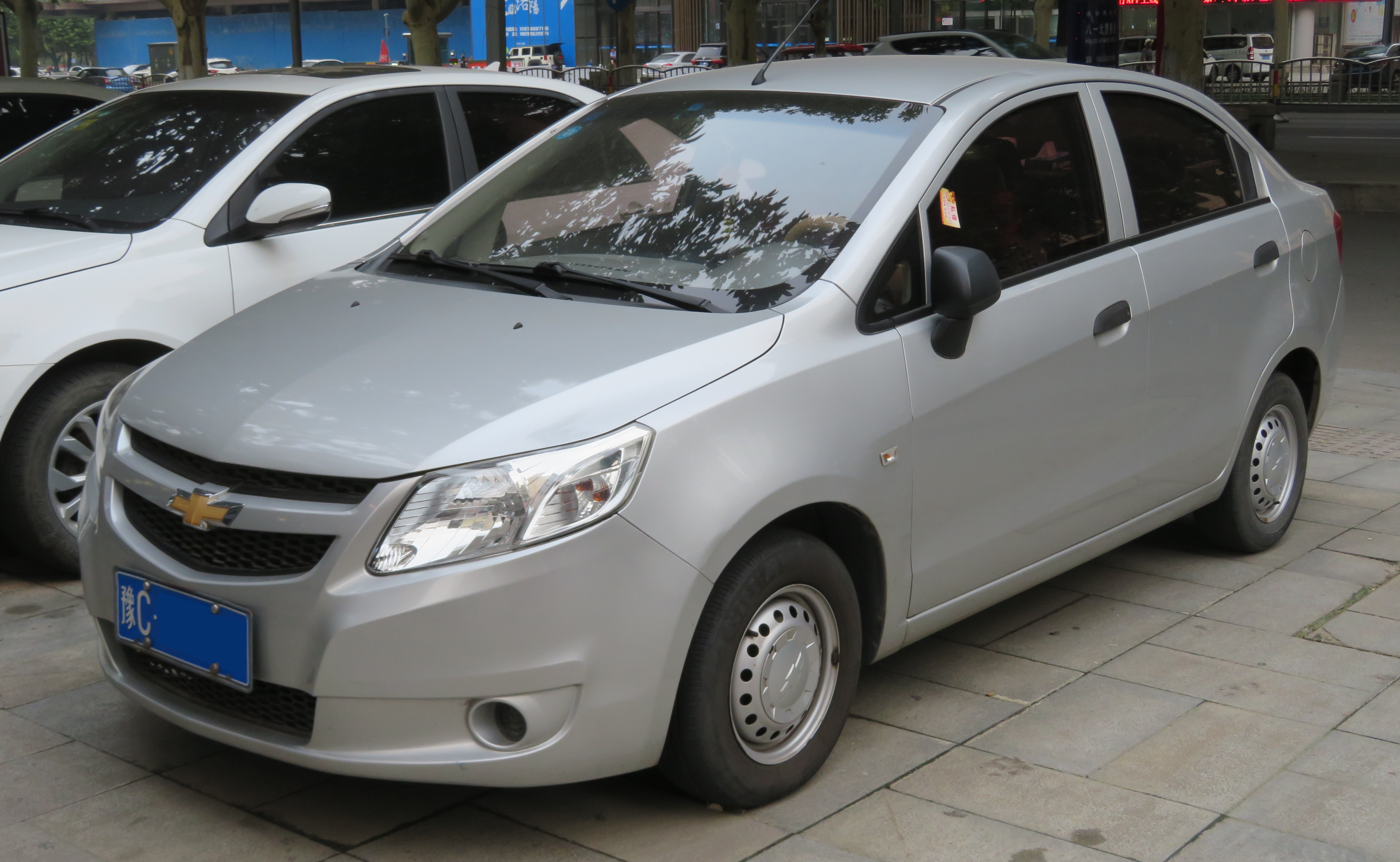

Overview
- Manufacturer: SAIC-GM
- Also called: Springo EV; Chevrolet Chevytaxi Premium (sedan taxi fleet, Colombia)
- Production: 2010–2015; 2012–2017 (India)
- Assembly: China: Yantai, Shandong (SAIC-GM); India: Halol, Gujarat (GM India); Colombia: Bogotá (GM Colmotores); Ecuador: Quito (GM Ecuador)
- Designer: James C. Shyr

Body and chassis
- Body style: 4-door sedan 5-door hatchback
- Platform: Gamma platform

Powertrain
- Engine: 1.2 L LMU I4 (petrol); 1.4 L LCU I4 (petrol); 1.3 L I4 (diesel)
- Transmission: 5-speed manual

Dimensions
- Wheelbase: 2,465 mm (97.0 in)
- Length: 3,946 mm (155.4 in) (hatchback); 4,249 mm (167.3 in) (sedan)
- Width: 1,690 mm (66.5 in)
- Height: 1,503 mm (59.2 in)
- Curb weight: 1,065–1,124 kg (2,348–2,478 lb)

Chronology
- Predecessor: Chevrolet Aveo (T200) (India)

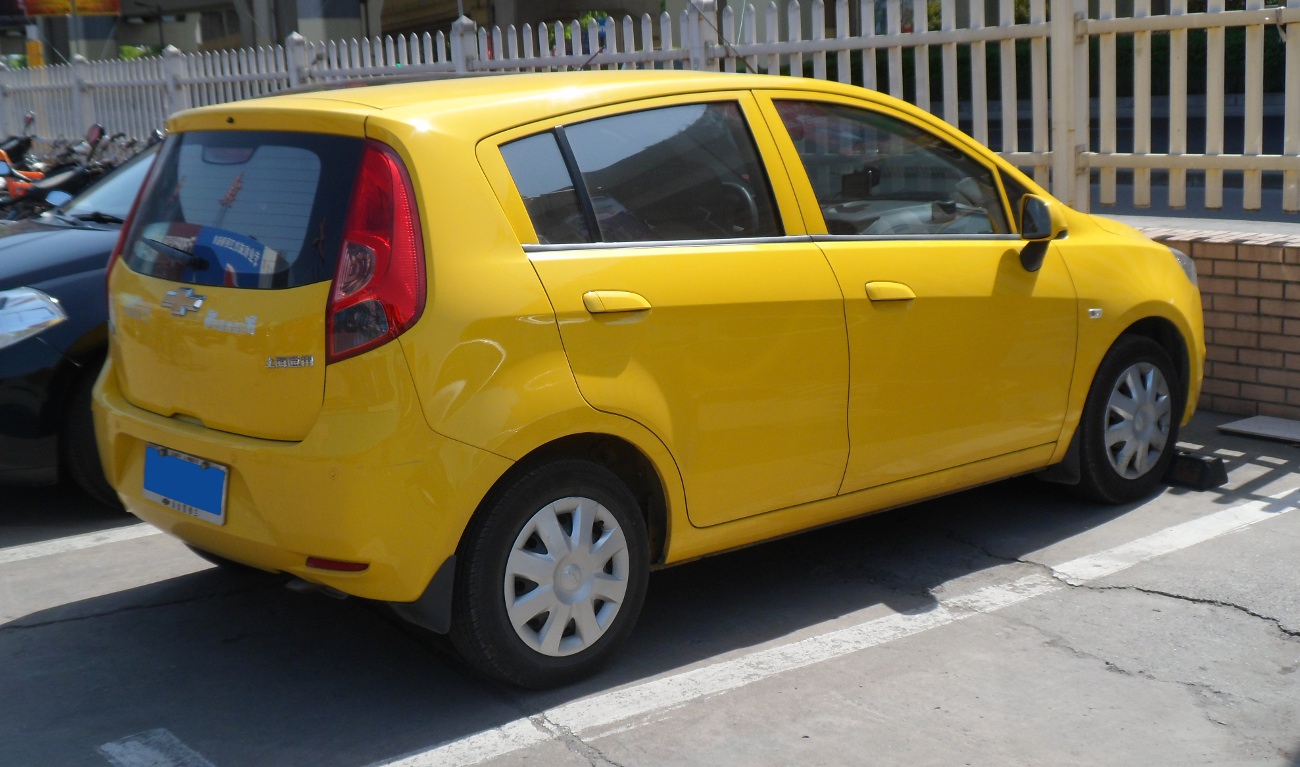
Chevrolet Sail hatchback (China)

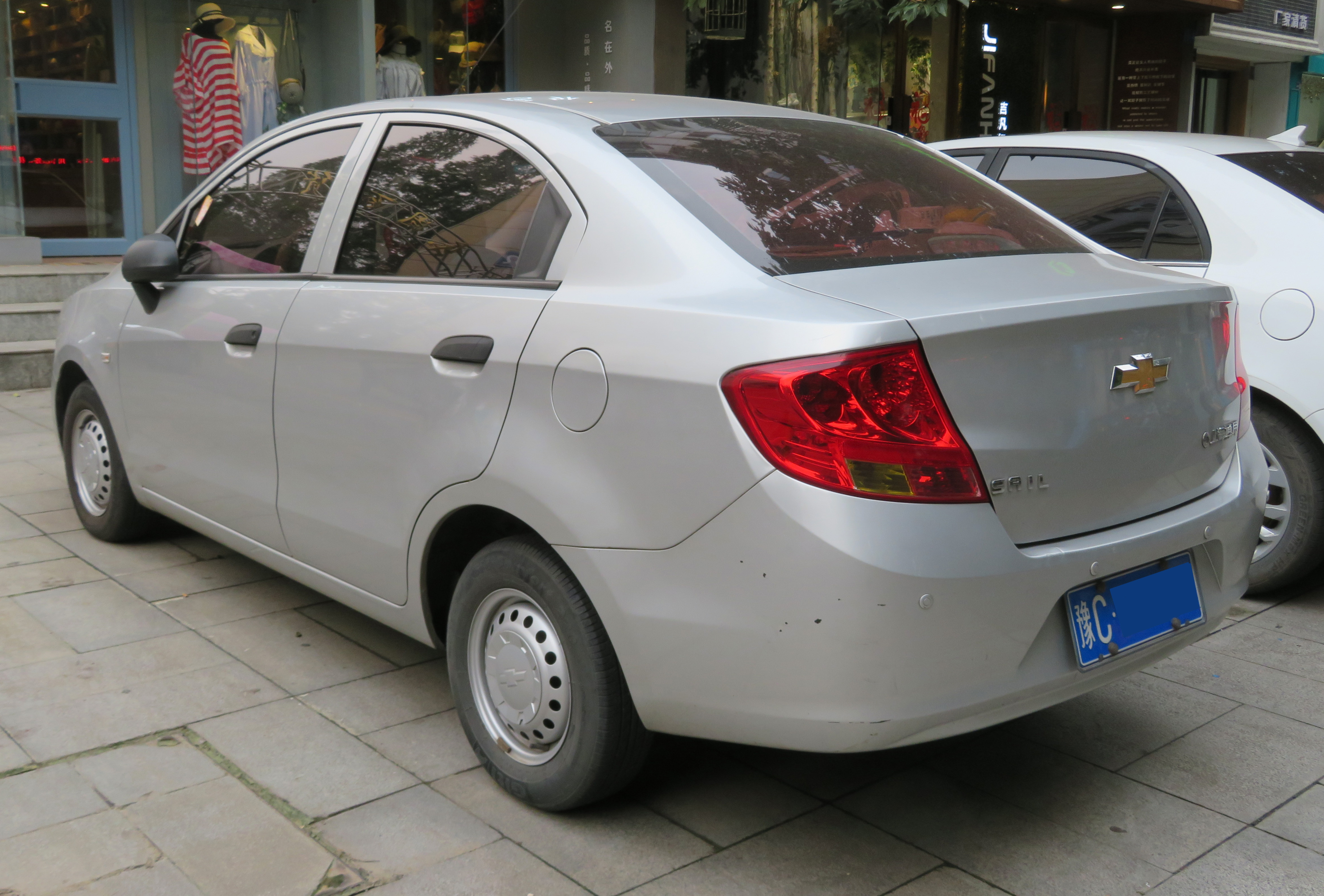
Chevrolet Sail sedan (China)

On 11 January 2010, Shanghai-GM introduced the all-new Chevrolet Sail. The car was designed and engineered by the Pan-Asia Technical Automotive Center (PATAC). A 1.2-litre S-TEC II 64 kW engine and a 1.4-litre 76 kW S-TEC III engine are available. The transmission options include a five-speed manual and a five-speed electronic manual transmission (EMT). It is said that this car was engineered to achieve 4 stars in China New Car Assessment Program (C-NCAP). Airbags, central locking, AUX in / USB input and power steering are standard equipment. The pricing begins from 56,800 RMB.

At the 2010 Auto China in Beijing, GM unveiled the Sail hatchback. This car is about 3947 mm long, but its trunk area has up to 1,215 litres of space. Engines and transmissions are shared with the Sail sedan. On 21 October 2010, the first new Sails were exported to Chile and Libya.

=== Safety ===
==== Latin NCAP ====
The Sail in its most basic Latin American market configuration with no airbags, no ABS and no ESC received 0 stars for adult occupants and 2 stars for toddlers from Latin NCAP 2.0 in 2016.

Latin NCAP 2.0 test results Chevrolet Sail - NO Airbags (2016, based on Euro NCAP 2008)
Test	Points	Stars
Adult occupant:	0.00/34.0	0 /5 stars
Child occupant:	23.21/49.00	2 /5 stars

=== Other markets ===
==== India ====
In India, the Chevrolet Sail U-VA hatchback was showcased for the first time at the New Delhi Auto Expo 2012 and launched nationwide on November 2, 2012. It features Chevrolet's signature dual port chrome grille, Hawk Wing styled headlamps and is available in seven colors. Its twenty-five storage spaces, along with ‘Flex Flat’ and 60:40 Folding Rear Row seats, making it one of the most spacious cars in the hatchback segment. The engineers at the GM Technical Center – India, in Bangalore, participated in localization of the vehicle to meet local requirements. The Chevrolet Sail U-VA is available in the 1.3 L Smartech turbocharged DOHC diesel and 1.2 L Smartech petrol engine variants. The 1.3 L diesel engine delivers 22.1 km/L while the 1.2 L petrol engine delivers a mileage of 18.2 km/L.

General Motors launched the new Chevrolet Sail in India in sedan and hatchback forms, with petrol and diesel versions, in four trim levels. The petrol version uses a 1.2 L S-Tec II engine which is also seen in the Indian market Chevrolet Beat. The 1.2 L petrol motor has power and torque figures of 86 PS (63 kW) at 6,000 rpm and 113 Nm at 5,000 rpm. The 1.3 L diesel engine is GM's version of the Fiat 1248 cc MultiJet motor, with figures of 78 PS (57 kW) at 4,000 rpm and 205 Nm at 1,750 rpm. The MultiJet engine is an outcome of alliance between GM and Fiat. GM offers a 5-speed manual transmission for both the petrol and diesel variants.

In 2018, the Sail contains 80% Indian parts.

==== South America ====
The Sail is also marketed on the Pacific coast of South America, in Chile, Colombia and Ecuador. It is assembled from CKD kits by General Motors of Ecuador, and also manufactured at least of 90% in Colombia by GM Colmotores in its factory on the Free Zone of Bogotá.

=== Springo EV (electric version) ===
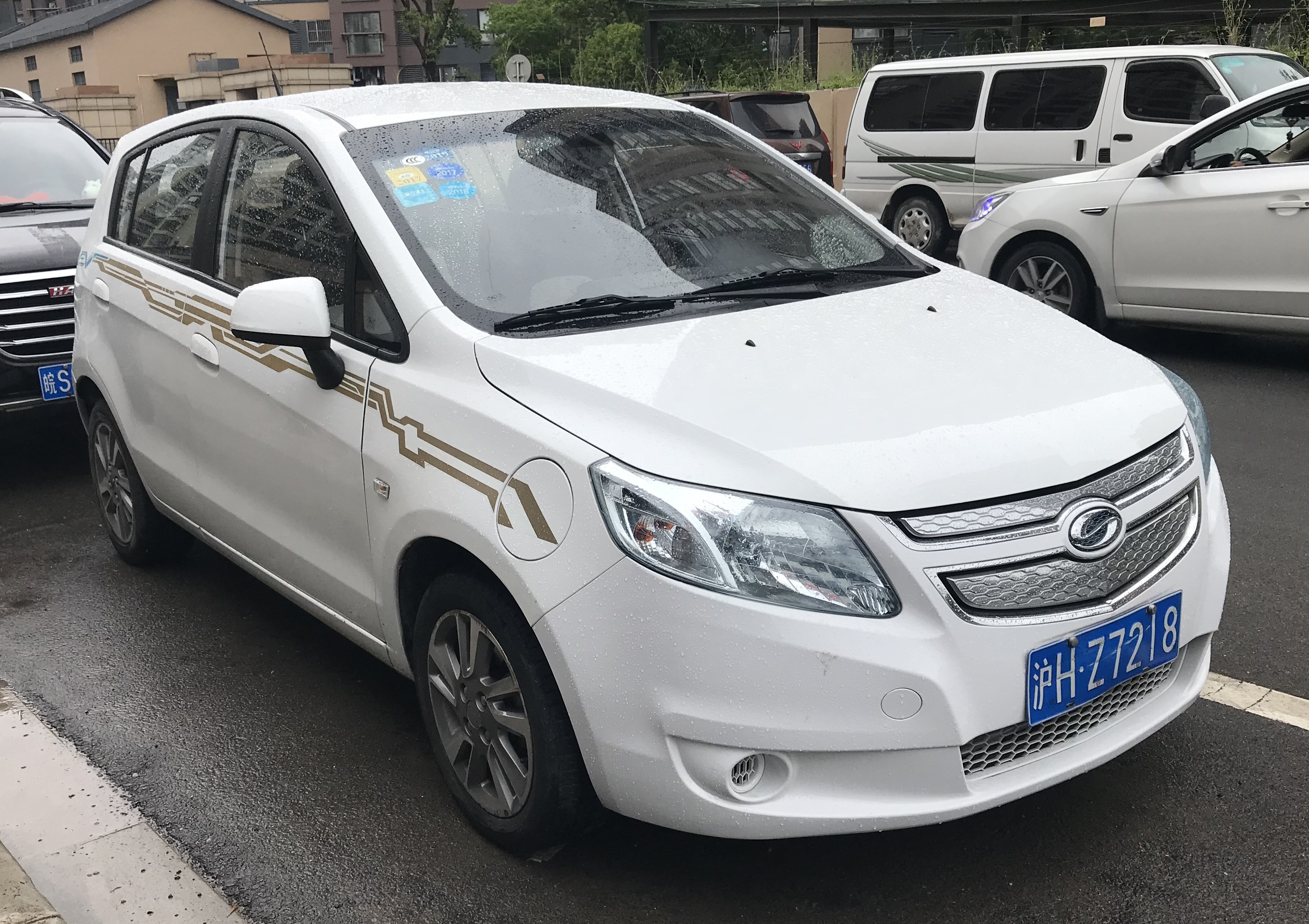

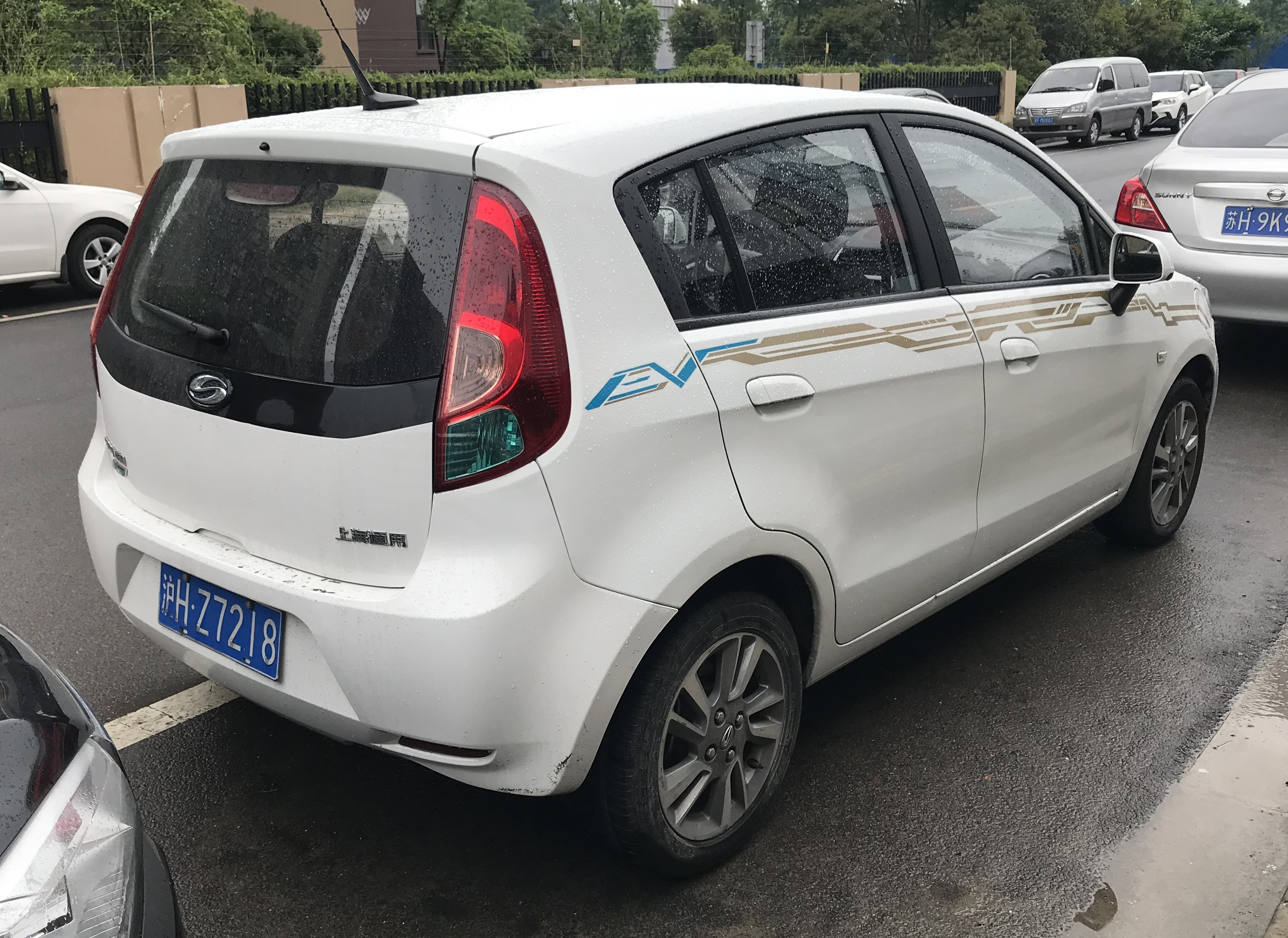
Springo EV

At the 2010 Guangzhou International Automobile Exhibition, GM showed an EV version of the Sail Hatchback called the Springo EV. Although this concept car does not wear a Chevrolet badge, it is still a part of Chevrolet's worldwide electric vehicle strategy. According to GM's press release, this car has a 65 kW (87 bhp) motor which has a maximum torque of 220 Nm (162 lb ft). Top speed is about 130 km/h (81 mph) and the driving range with full battery is claimed as 150 km (93 mi). It was also reported that this car had reached the electric vehicle safety requirements set by SAE and ISO.

Shanghai General Motors introduced the Sail Springo EV at the 2012 Auto Guangzhou. The electric car is scheduled to be sold in Shanghai in 2013 as part of a trial program, and initially only a limited number of cars will be available. The Springo EV has a range of 130 km (81 mi) and up to 200 km (120 mi) at a constant speed of 60 km/h (37 mph). The electric car will be sold for RMB 258,000 (US$41,460), before incentives of up to RMB 60,000 (US$9,642) from the central government and RMB 40,000 (US$6,428) from the Shanghai government. In addition, the car will qualify for a free local Shanghai license plate exclusively for electric vehicles. The Sail Springo EV was developed as joint-venture between Shanghai General Motors and partner SAIC Motor.

== Third generation (2014) ==
Third generation
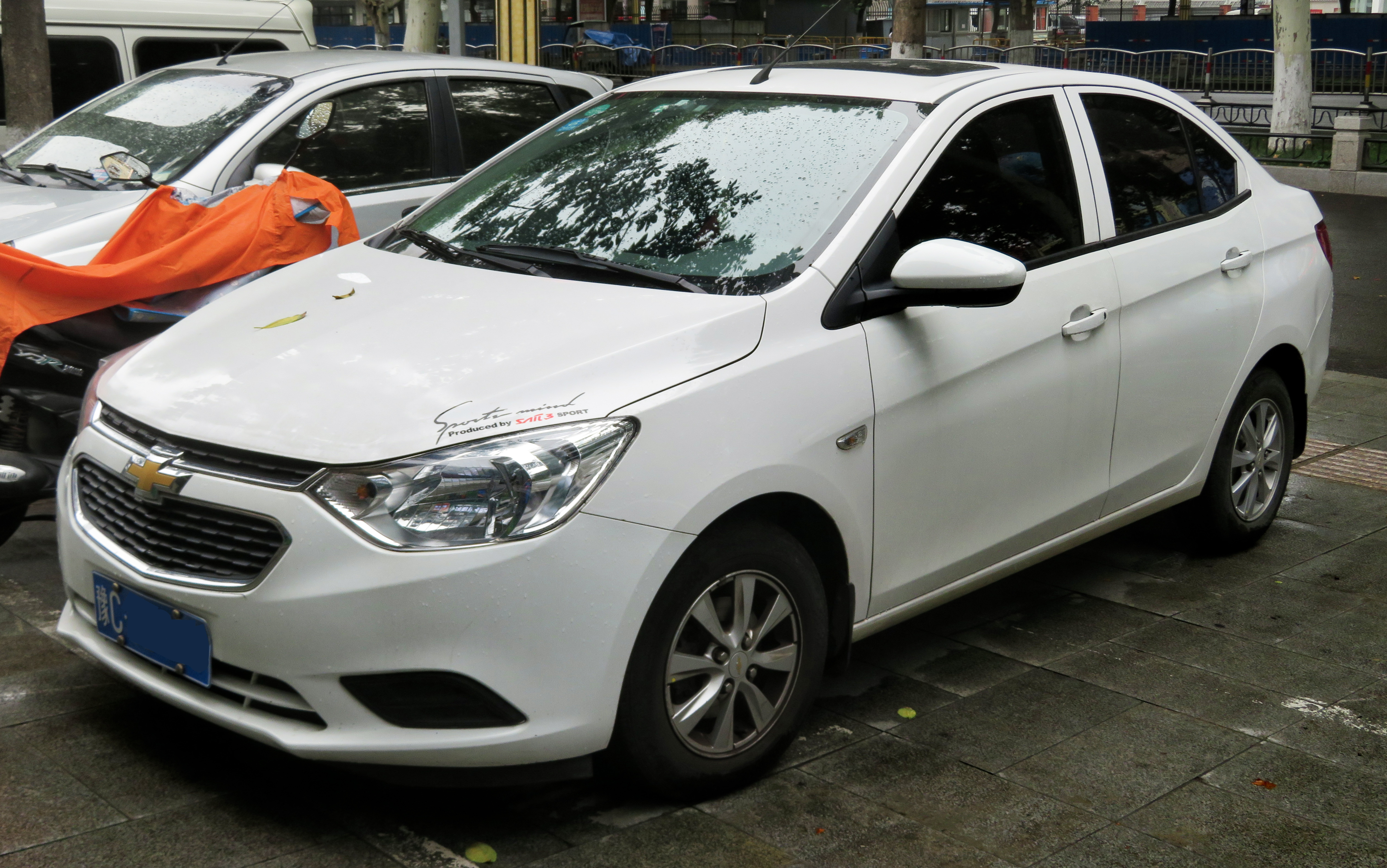
- Chevrolet Sail sedan (China)

Overview
- Manufacturer: SAIC-GM
- Also called: Chevrolet Aveo (Mexico and Central America)
- Production: 2014–2023
- Assembly: China: Yantai, Shandong (SAIC-GM); Ecuador: Quito (GM Ecuador)

Body and chassis
- Body style: 4-door sedan
- Related: Chevrolet Lova RV

Powertrain
- Engine: 1.3 L LEW I4 (petrol); 1.5 L L2B I4 (petrol)
- Transmission: 5-speed manual 4-speed automatic

Dimensions
- Wheelbase: 2,500 mm (98.4 in)
- Length: 4,300 mm (169.3 in)
- Width: 1,735 mm (68.3 in)
- Height: 1,504 mm (59.2 in)

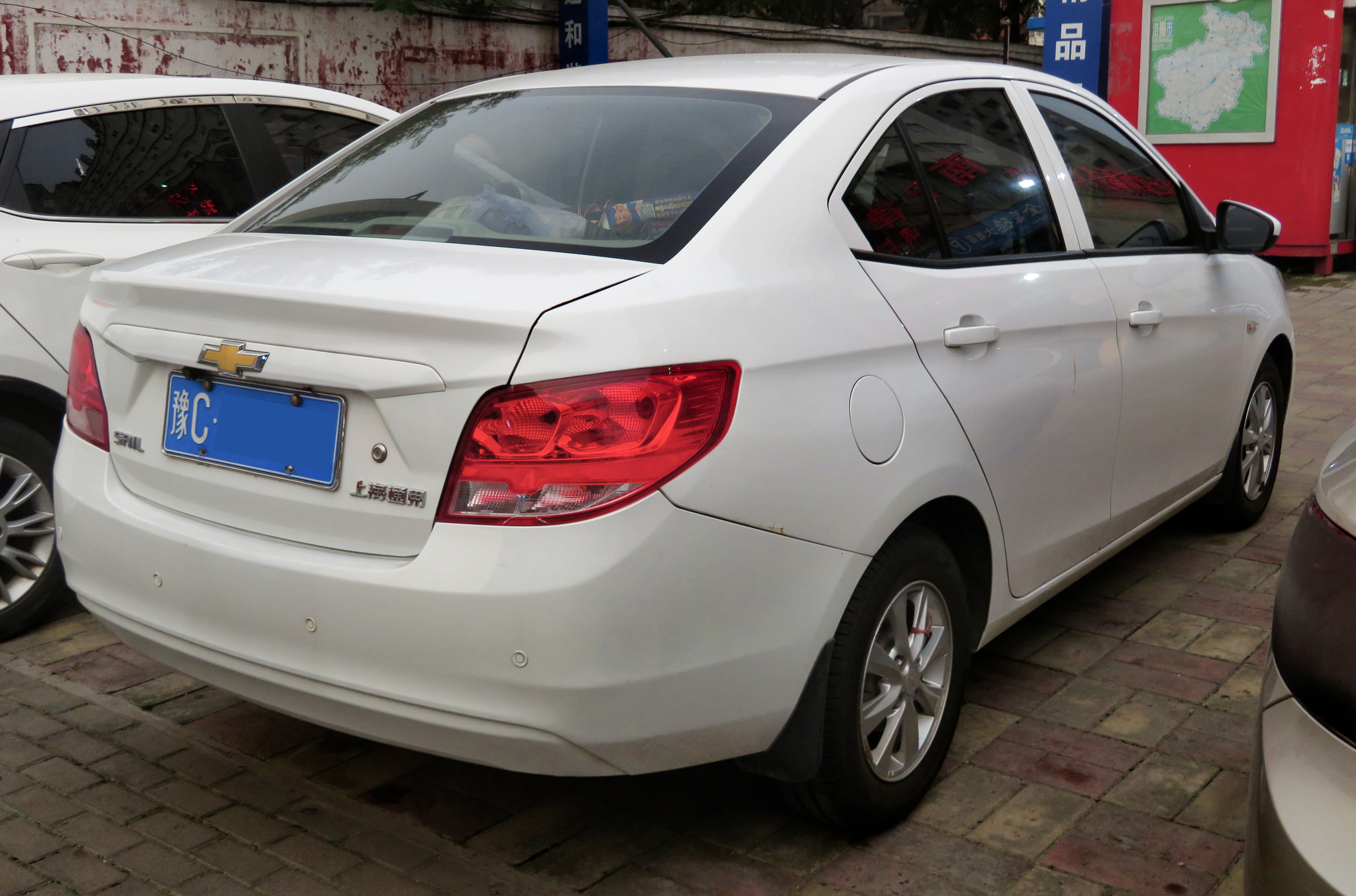
Chevrolet Sail sedan rear

The third generation Chevrolet Sail was presented for the first time in November 2014 at the Guangzhou Auto Show and commenced production in December 2014. It is based on a new small car platform developed by SAIC-GM, and adopts Chevrolet's new design language, with the dual-port grille and the eagle eye-shaped headlamps.

With a length of 4,300 mm (169.3 in), larger by 45 mm (1.8 in) than the previous generation, and a wheelbase of 2,500 mm (98.4 in), extended by 35 mm (1.4 in), it now provides a roomier interior space. The boot has a total of 366 L (12.9 cu ft) of space.

The powertrain range consists of two petrol engines: a 1.3-litre VVT unit and a 1.5-litre DVVT one, both equipped with start-stop function and delivering improved performance compared to the previous generation. The 1.3-litre engine offers a maximum power of 76 kW (103 PS) and a peak torque of 127 N⋅m (93.7 lb⋅ft), having a fuel economy of 5.3 L/100 km (53 mpg_{‑imp}; 44 mpg_{‑US}). The 1.5-litre engine generates a maximum power of 83 kW (113 PS) and a peak torque of 141 N⋅m (104.0 lb⋅ft), having a fuel economy of 5.4 L/100 km (52 mpg_{‑imp}; 44 mpg_{‑US}).

It was developed by SAIC-GM and Pan Asia Technical Automotive Center (PATAC) engineers, and is available only as a four-door saloon. It is exported to markets such as Chile, Philippines, Peru, Mexico (sold as Aveo) and Myanmar. The car was discontinued in the Chinese domestic market in 2019.

The Sail is renamed as the Aveo in Mexico and other Central American markets to avoid any association with the second generation Sail, which had obtained zero star rating in Latin NCAP in 2016. It went on sale in Mexico in November 2017 for the 2019 model year.

=== Safety ===
==== Latin NCAP ====
The Chinese-made New Aveo in its most basic Latin American market configuration with 2 airbags and no ESC received 2 stars for adult occupants and 4 stars for toddlers from Latin NCAP 2.0 in 2018.

Latin NCAP 2.0 test results Chevrolet New Aveo + 2 Airbags (2018, based on Euro NCAP 2008)
Test	Points	Stars
Adult occupant:	23.76/34.0	2 /5 stars
Child occupant:	37.02/49.00	4 /5 stars

The updated Chinese-made New Aveo in its most basic Latin American market configuration with 2 airbags and no ESC received 3 stars for adult occupants and 4 stars for toddlers from Latin NCAP 2.0 in 2019.

Latin NCAP 2.0 test results Chevrolet New Aveo + 2 Airbags (from May 2019) (2019, based on Euro NCAP 2008)
Test	Points	Stars
Adult occupant:	23.76/34.0	3 /5 stars
Child occupant:	37.02/49.00	4 /5 stars

== Fourth generation (310C; 2023) ==
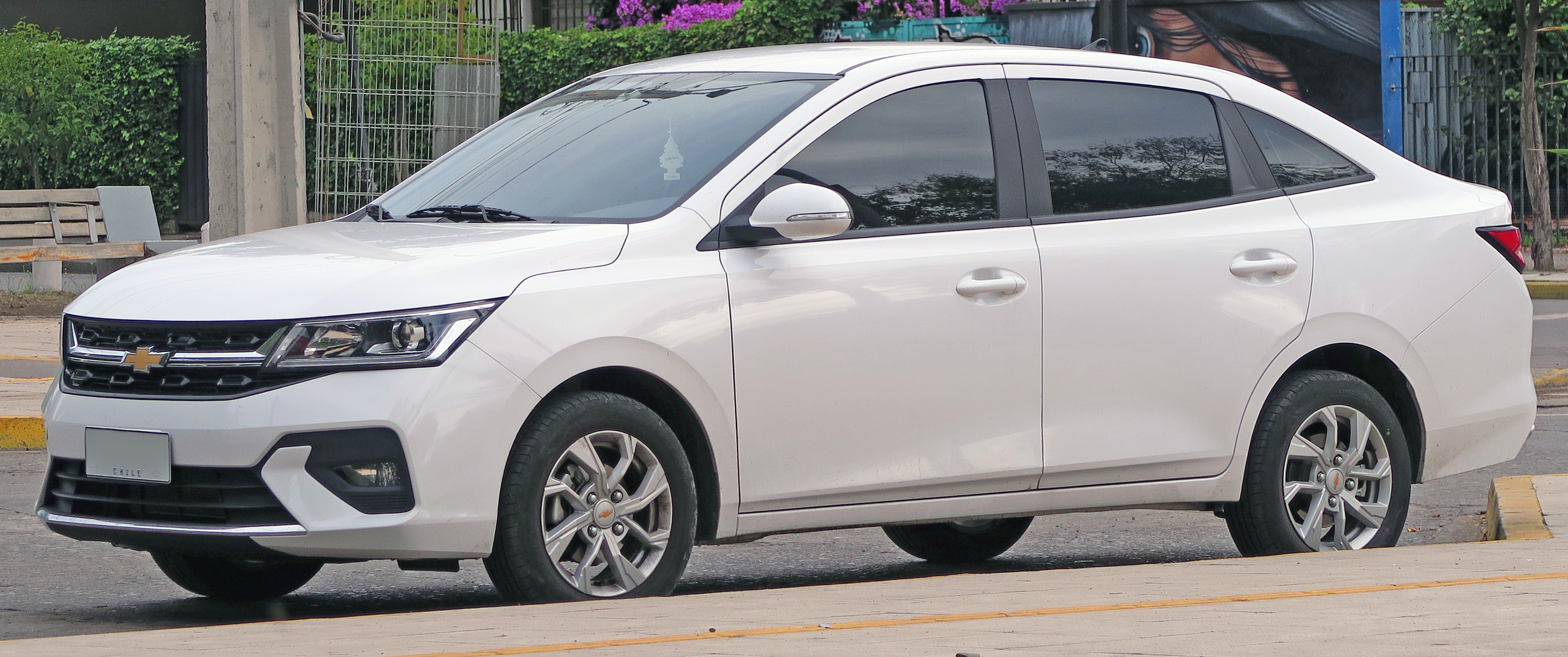
2024 Chevrolet Sail

The fourth-generation Sail became available in Chile and other nearby countries since September 2023 as a 2024 model year. The model is a rebadged Chevrolet Aveo and produced by SAIC-GM-Wuling in China.
