= Wuling Hongguang V =

Compact MPV

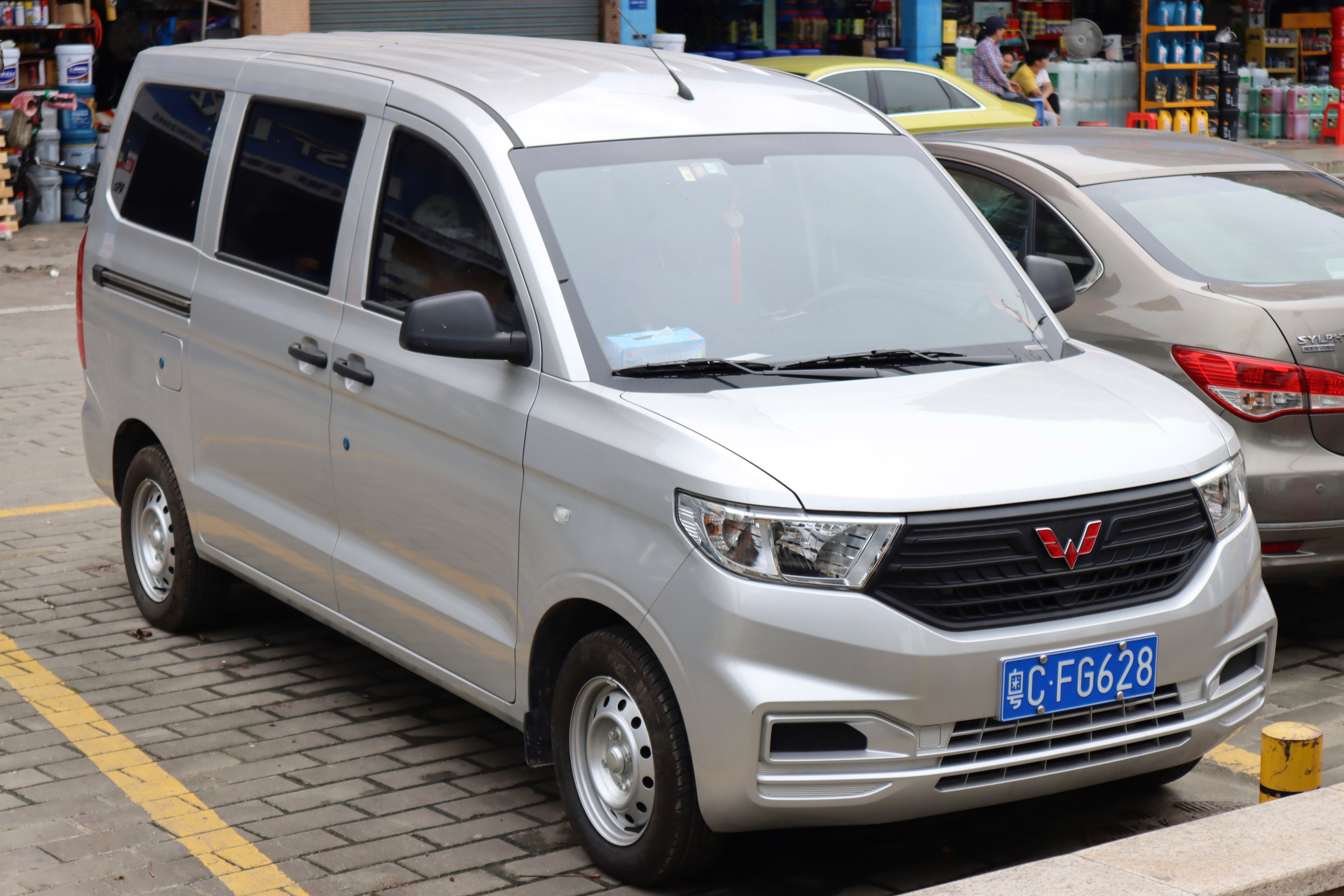

Overview
- Manufacturer: SAIC-GM-Wuling
- Production: 2015–present
- Assembly: China: Liuzhou, Guangxi (SAIC-GM-Wuling)

Body and chassis
- Class: Compact van
- Body style: 5-door van
- Layout: Front-engine, rear-wheel-drive

The Wuling Hongguang V or previously Wuling Rongguang V is a compact Multi-Purpose Vehicle (MPV) produced since 2015 by SAIC-GM-Wuling. Despite being part of the Wuling Hongguang product series, the Wuling Hongguang V features sliding doors instead of hinged ones from the regular Wuling Hongguang MPVs.

== First generation (2015) ==
Wuling Hongguang V
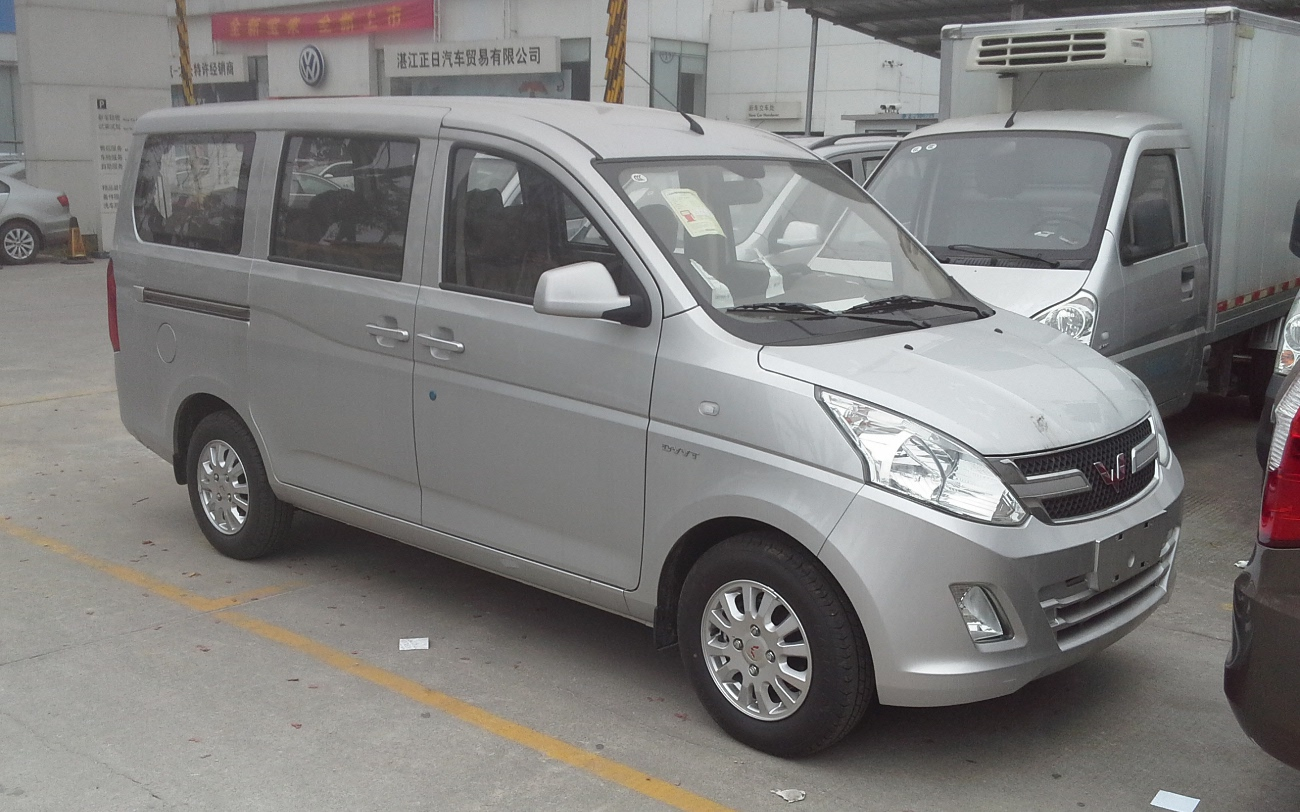

Overview
- Also called: Wuling Rongguang V
- Production: 2015–2019

Powertrain
- Engine: 1.2 L LMH/LMU I4 (petrol); 1.5 L L2B I4 (petrol)
- Transmission: 5-speed manual

Dimensions
- Wheelbase: 2,720 mm (107.1 in)
- Length: 4,415 mm (173.8 in)
- Width: 1,665 mm (65.6 in)
- Height: 1,850 mm (72.8 in)

Chronology
- Successor: Wuling Hongguang S Wuling Hongguang V II

The Wuling Hongguang V was launched previously in January 2015, and later was renamed to Wuling Rongguang V to be sold under the Wuling Rongguang series with prices ranging from 39,800 yuan to 49,800 yuan. Different from the regular Wuling Hongguang, the Wuling Hongguang V or Wuling Rongguang V features sliding doors instead of hinged doors.

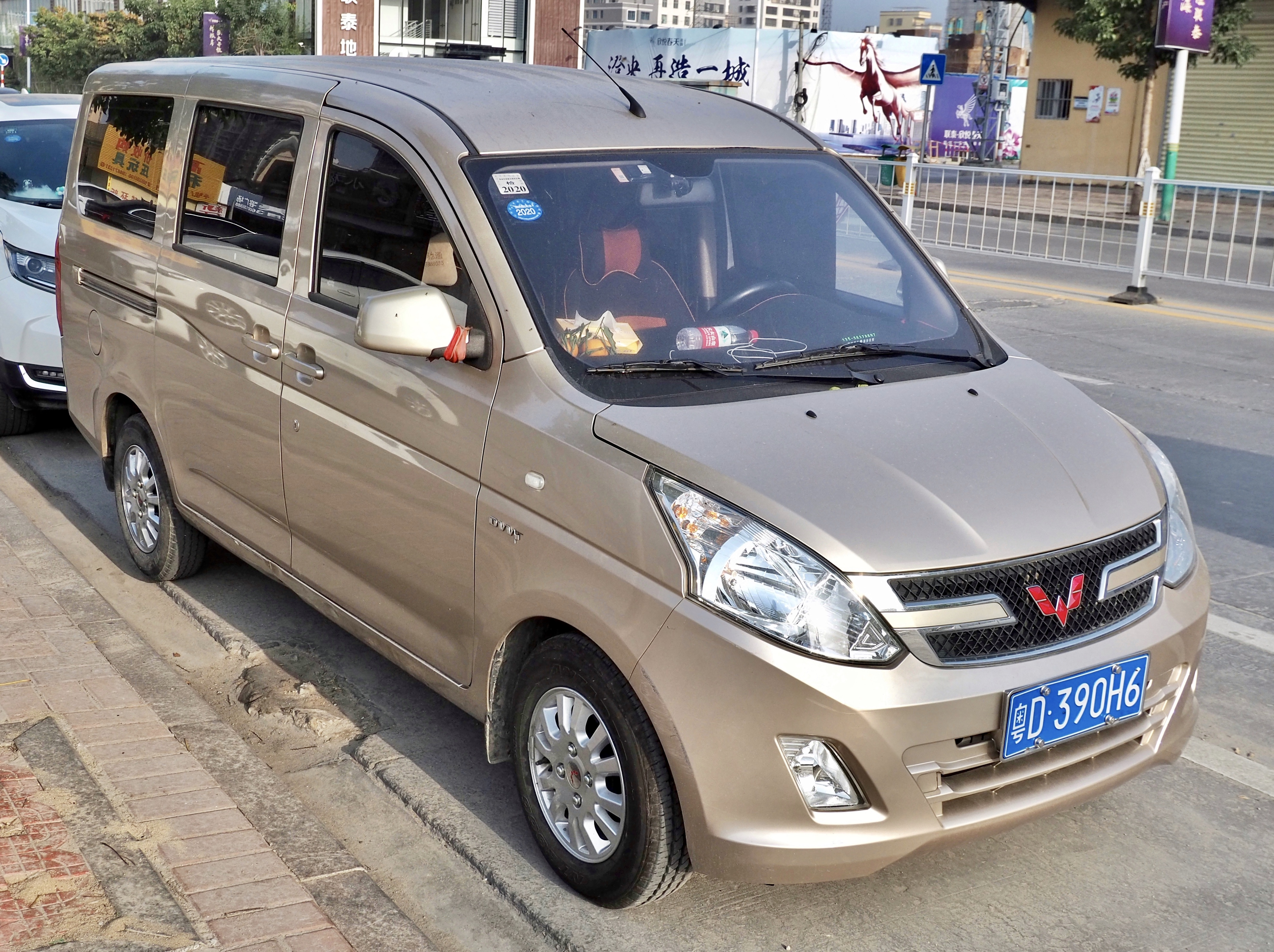
Wuling Hongguang V front

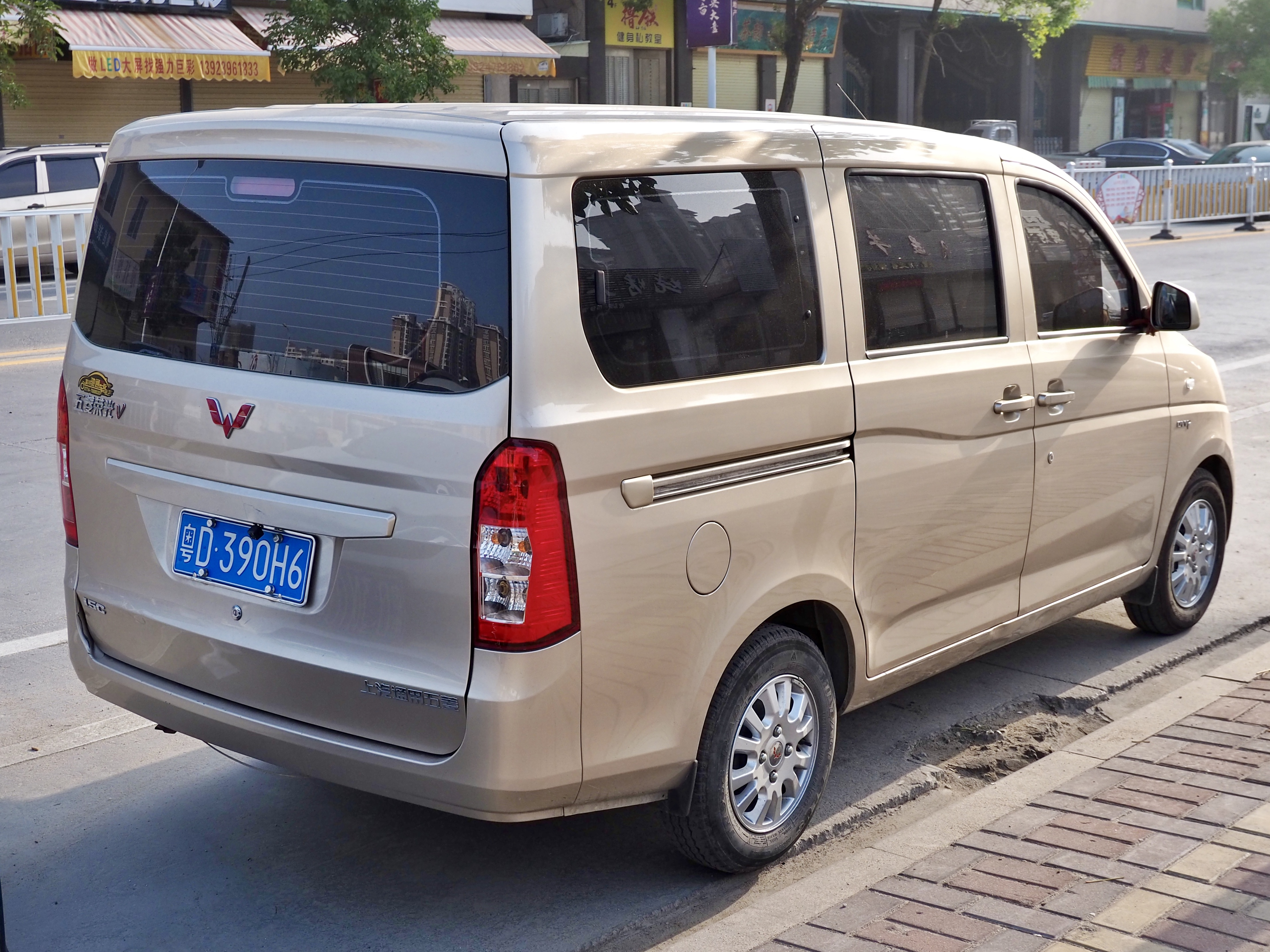
Wuling Hongguang V rear

== Second generation (2019) ==
Wuling Hongguang V
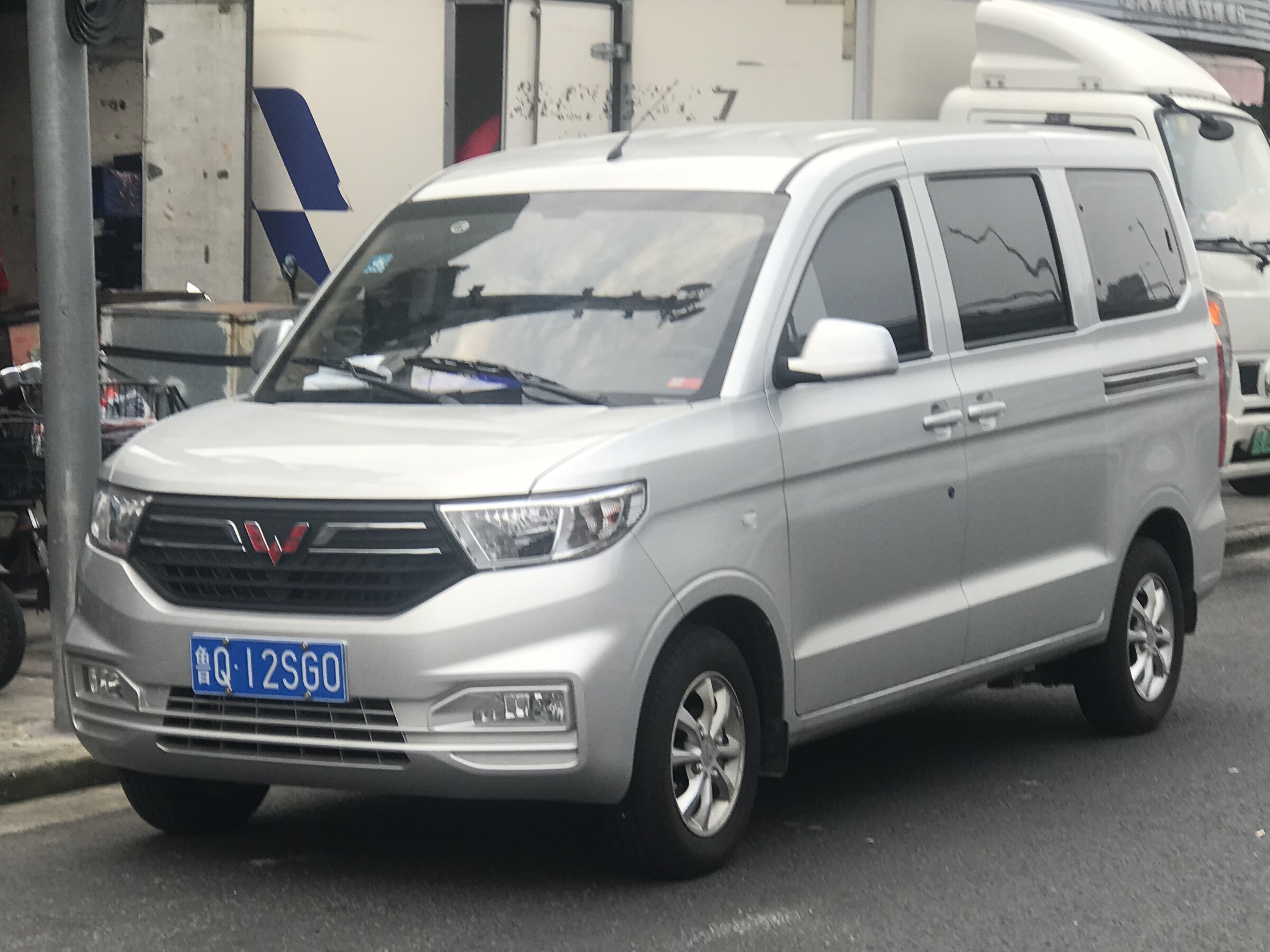

Overview
- Model code: CN110V
- Also called: Chevrolet N400 (Latin America); Chevrolet Tornado Van (Mexico); Chevrolet Damas Max/Move (Uzbekistan)
- Production: 2019–present

Powertrain
- Engine: 1.2 L LMH I4 (petrol); 1.5 L LAR I4 (petrol); 1.5 L L2B I4 (petrol)
- Transmission: 5-speed manual

Dimensions
- Wheelbase: 2,850 mm (112.2 in)
- Length: 4,425 mm (174.2 in)
- Width: 1,670 mm (65.7 in)
- Height: 1,860 mm (73.2 in)

Chronology
- Predecessor: Chevrolet Montana (Mexico)

The second generation Wuling Hongguang V updated the front fascia to a design that's similar to the later revealed second generation Wuling Hongguang (Wuling Hongguang II). The second generation model was sold from 41,800 yuan to 55,800 yuan.

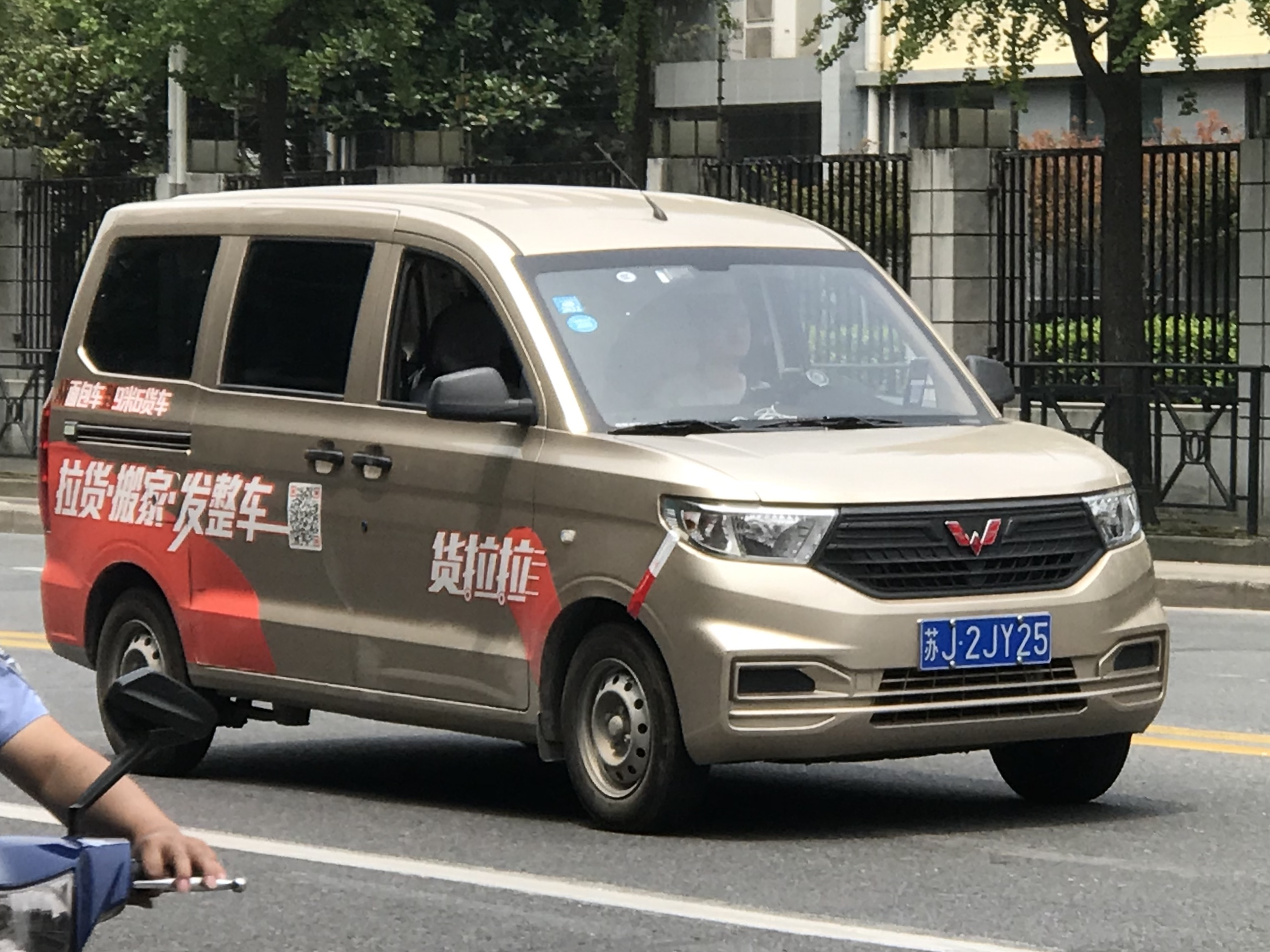
Wuling Hongguang V II front

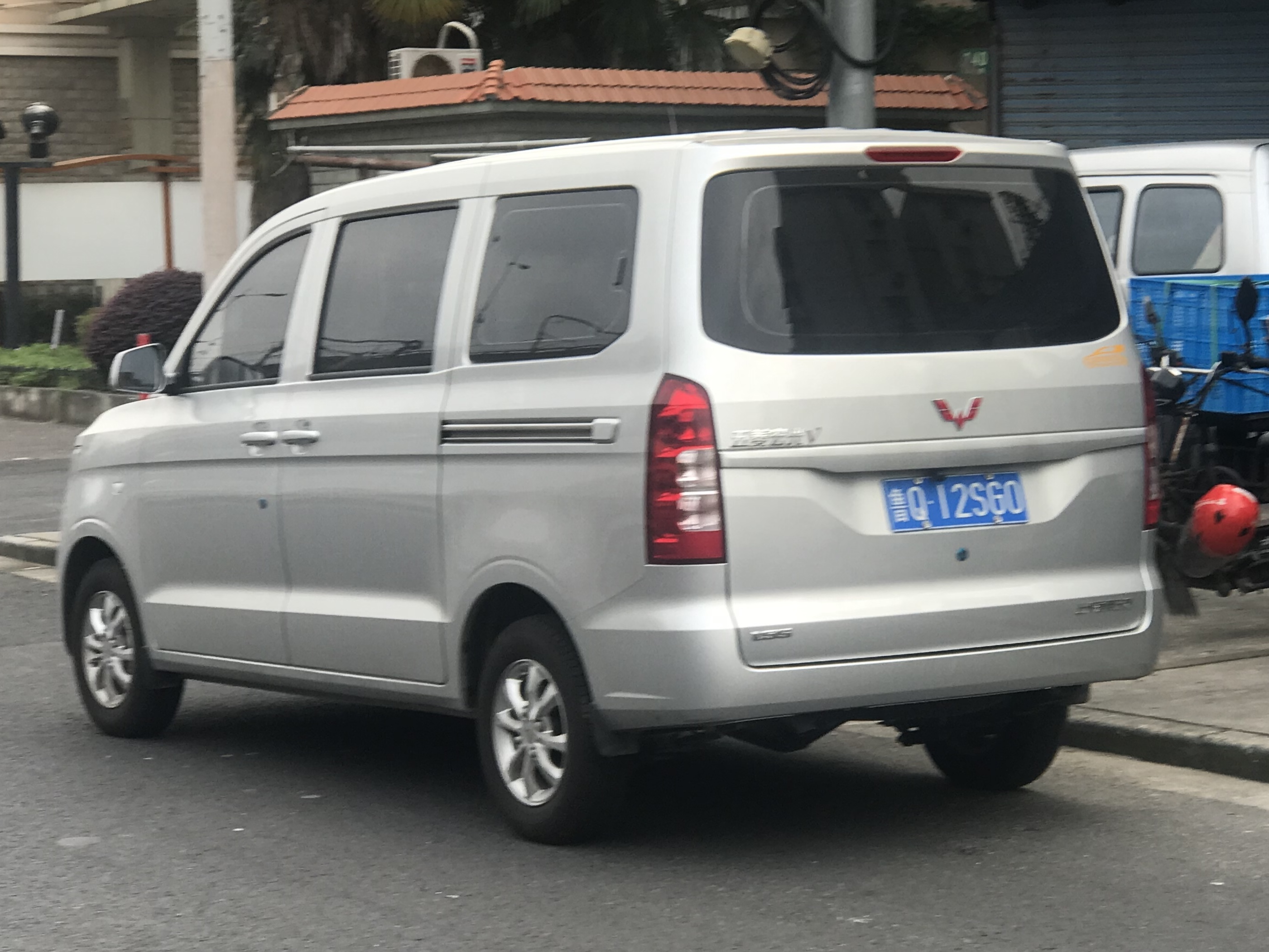
Wuling Hongguang V II rear

=== Chevrolet N400 ===
The Chevrolet N400 is a van which has two types:

- N400 Post
- N400 People

Sold in Ecuador, Chile, etc.

=== Chevrolet Tornado Van ===
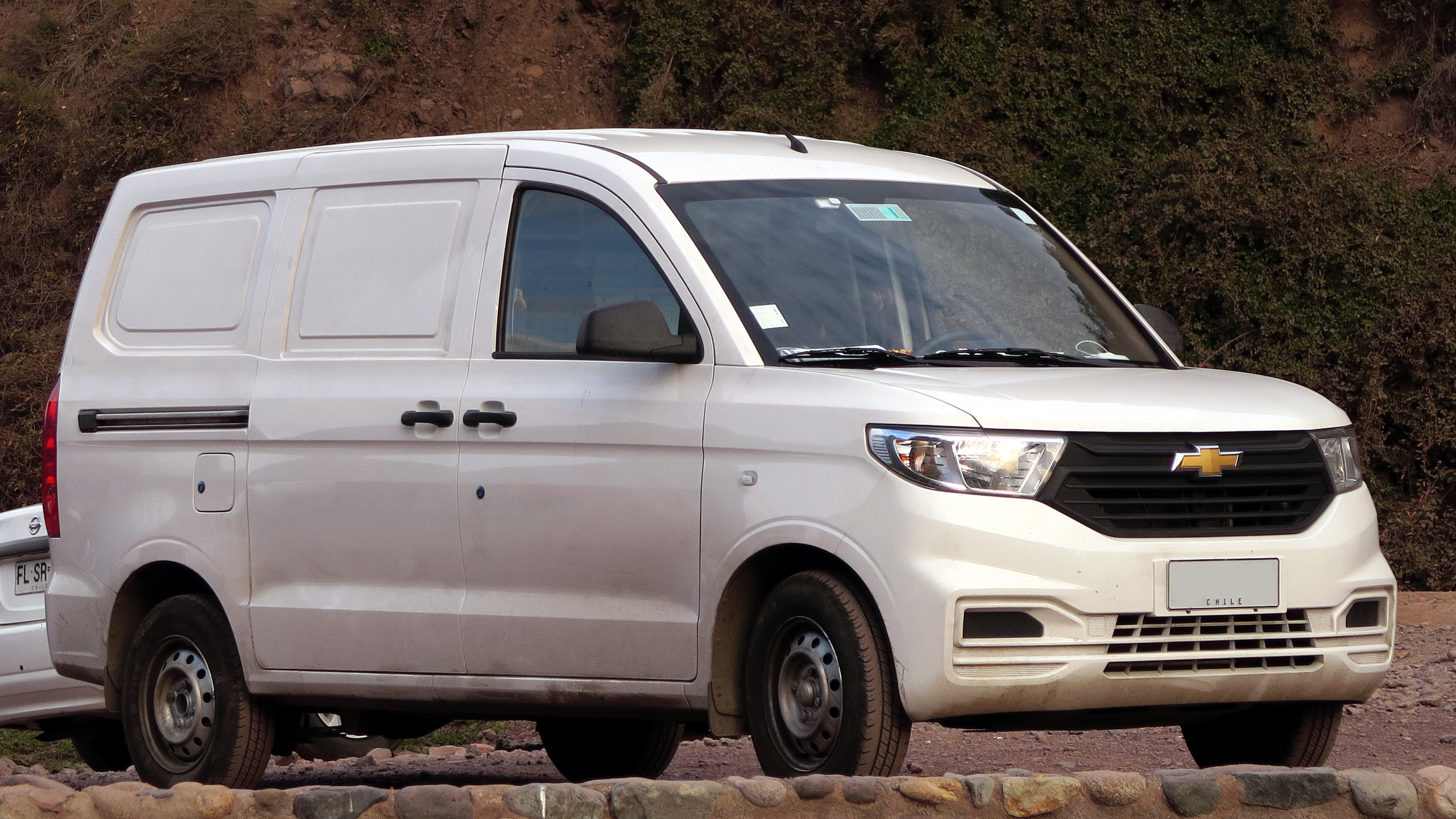
N400 Max 2021 in Chile

The Chevrolet Tornado is the Mexican market name for the Chevrolet N400/Wuling Hongguang V. It was announced in late March 2021 and was released on August 2nd of that year. Previously the Tornado nameplate was used in Mexico for the Chevrolet Montana truck between 2004 and 2020. The Tornado Van was the replacement for this coupé utility. It only is offered in one trim, the LS. Which is powered by a 1.5 litre engine. It is only offered in two colors, White and Metallic Silver. This model is one of several Chinese rebadged Chevrolet's that have been introduced to the Mexican and Latin American market. Including the Chevrolet Cavalier, Chevrolet Tracker, Chevrolet Captiva, and the Chevrolet S10 Max.

== Sales ==
Year	China
2023	
2024	82,811
2025	69,370
