= Badhalawadi =

Village in Maharashtra

- Village
- Location in Maharashtra, India Badhalawadi (India)
- Coordinates: 18.8055698°N 73.4402884°E
- Country: India
- State: Maharashtra
- District: Pune
- Tehsil: Mawal

Government
  - Type: Panchayati Raj
  - Body: Gram panchayat

Area
  - Total: 814.66 ha (2,013.1 acres)

Population (2011)
  - Total: 1,202
  - Density: 147.5/km^{2} (382.1/sq mi)
- Sex ratio 621/581 ♂/♀

Languages
  - Official: Marathi
  - Other spoken: Hindi
- Time zone: UTC+5:30 (IST)
- PIN: 410507
- Telephone code: +91-2114
- ISO 3166 code: IN-MH
- Vehicle registration: MH-14
- Vidhan Sabha constituency: Maval_(Vidhan_Sabha_constituency)
- Lok Sabha constituency: Maval
- Website: pune.nic.in

Badhalawadi is a village in Mawal taluka of Pune district in the state of Maharashtra, India. It encompasses an area of 814.66 ha (2,013 acres).

== Administration ==
The village is administrated by a sarpanch, an elected representative who leads a gram panchayat. At the time of the 2011 Census of India, the gram panchayat governed four villages and was based at Navlakh Umbre.

== Demographics ==
At the 2011 census, the village comprised 198 households. The population of 1202 was split between 621 males and 581 females.

== Economy ==
Agriculture was the main occupation for villagers, like the Economy of District But from several years due to Industrialisation, the economy has changed very few farmers are left.

=== Talegaon MIDC ===
Maharashtra Industrial Development Corporation has acquired most of land in Badhalwadi and nearby villages for Talegaon MIDC. many International companies have set their Manufacturing plants in MIDC. Badhalawadi village is in Talegaon MIDC Phase 2.

Below are companies in Village Badhalawadi

1. York Transport Equipment (I) Pvt. Ltd

2. ABHA Group

3. Aichelin Unitherm – Heat Treatment Systems,

4. POSCO has set POSCOTMC INDIA PVT

More industries will be set in the village.

==== Nearby Industries ====
General Motors India has set their Manufacturing plant in Umbare Navalakh 2 km from badhalawadi. Other major industries are mentioned below.

1. General Electric has set plant in Chakan MIDC (6 km)
2. JCB (company) has manufacturing plant in talegaon MIDC
3. Norma Group NORMA GROUP PRODUCTS INDIA PVT LTD
4. UMW Dongshin plant in Umbare Navalakh
5. Emitec Emission Control Technologies India Private Limited

== Education ==
There is one primary school in the village, run by Pune Zilla Parishad. This Marathi language school offers education up to 7th standard.

== See also ==
- List of villages in Mawal taluka
