= Wuling Hongguang =

Compact MPV

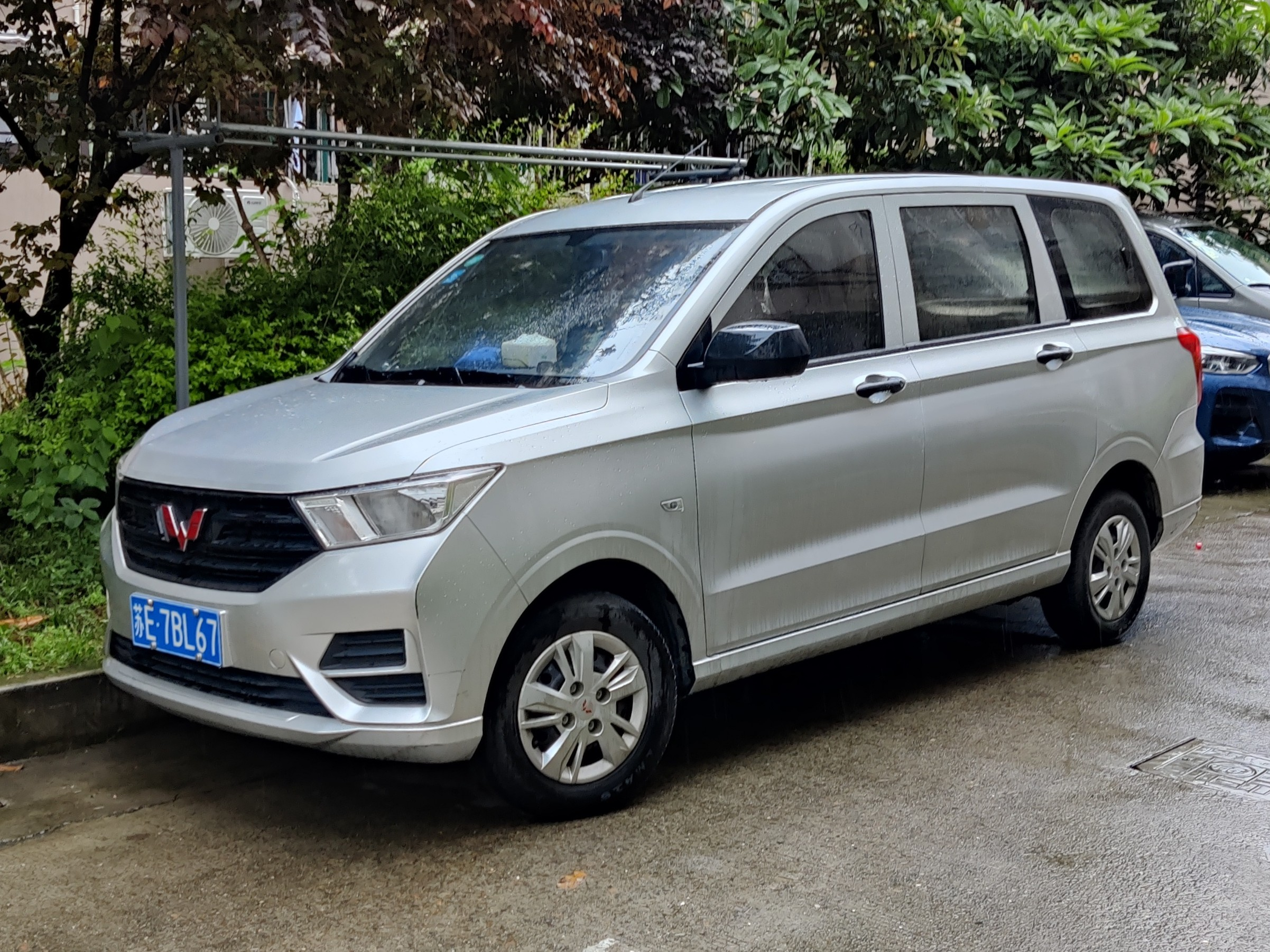
- Second generation Wuling Hongguang S

Overview
- Manufacturer: SAIC-GM-Wuling
- Production: 2010–present

Body and chassis
- Class: Compact MPV
- Body style: 5-door wagon
- Layout: Front-engine, rear-wheel-drive

The Wuling Hongguang (Chinese: 五菱宏光; pinyin: Wǔlíng hóngguāng) is a compact MPV produced since September 2010 by SAIC-GM-Wuling. Between 2013 and 2017, it was marketed as the Chevrolet Enjoy in India by GM India.

== First generation (2010) ==
First generation
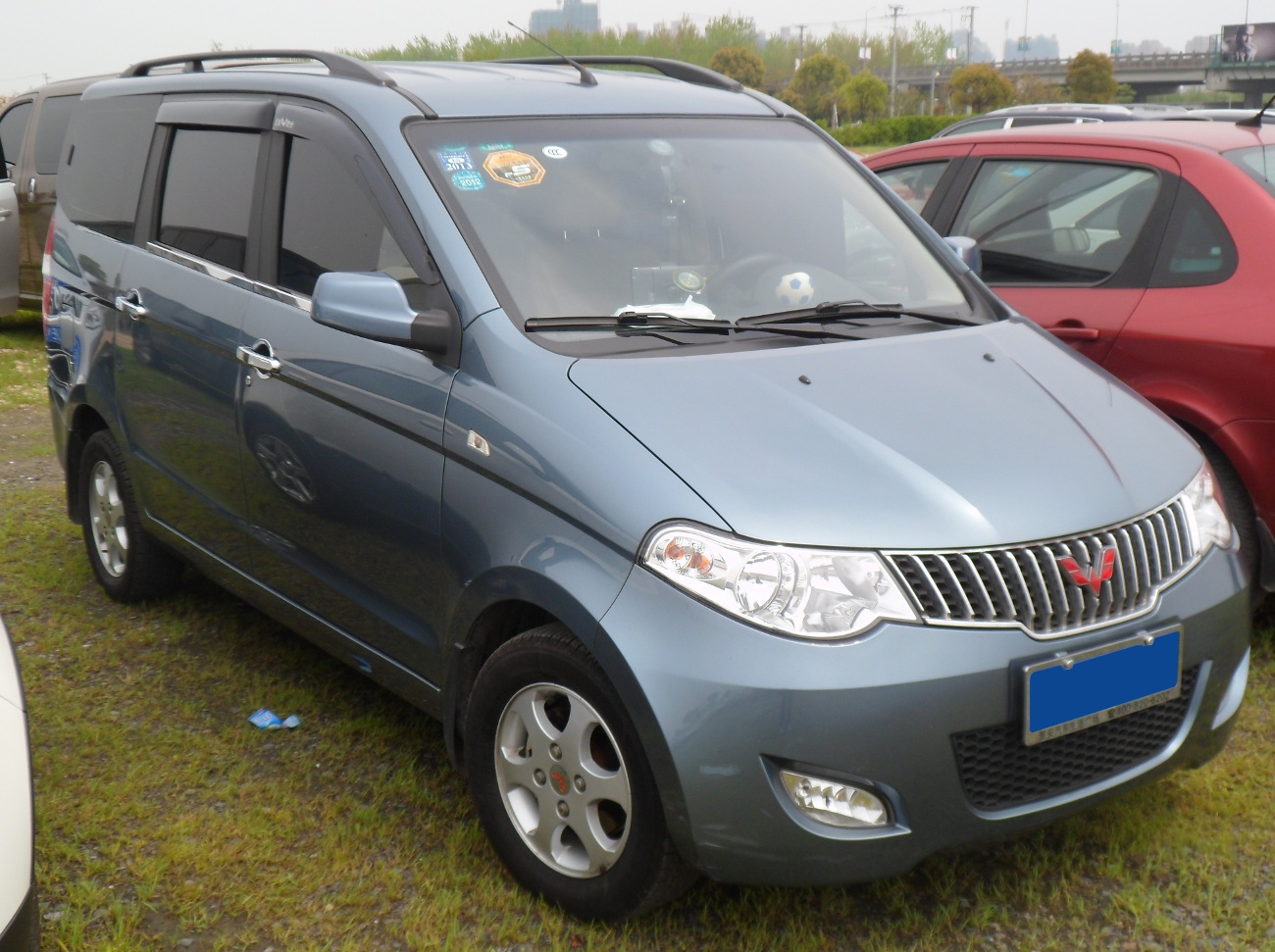

Overview
- Model code: CN112
- Also called: Chevrolet Enjoy (India); Wuling Hongguang S Wuling Hongguang S Classic (2019–present); Tianjin Qingyuan QY5020XYZBEVEZ (electric van)
- Production: 2010–2013; 2010–present (Hongguang S)
- Assembly: China: Liuzhou, Guangxi; India: Halol, Gujarat (GM India)

Body and chassis
- Layout: Longitudinal front-engine, rear-wheel drive

Powertrain
- Engine: China: 1.2 L LMH/LMU I4 (petrol); 1.4 L LCU I4 (petrol); 1.5 L L2B I4 (petrol); India: 1.4 L S-TEC I4 (petrol); 1.3 L S-TEC I4 (diesel)
- Transmission: 5-speed manual

Dimensions
- Wheelbase: 2,720 mm (107.1 in)
- Length: 4,400 mm (173.2 in)
- Width: 1,680 mm (66.1 in)
- Height: 1,750–1,770 mm (68.9–69.7 in)
- Curb weight: 1,130–1,260 kg (2,491–2,778 lb)

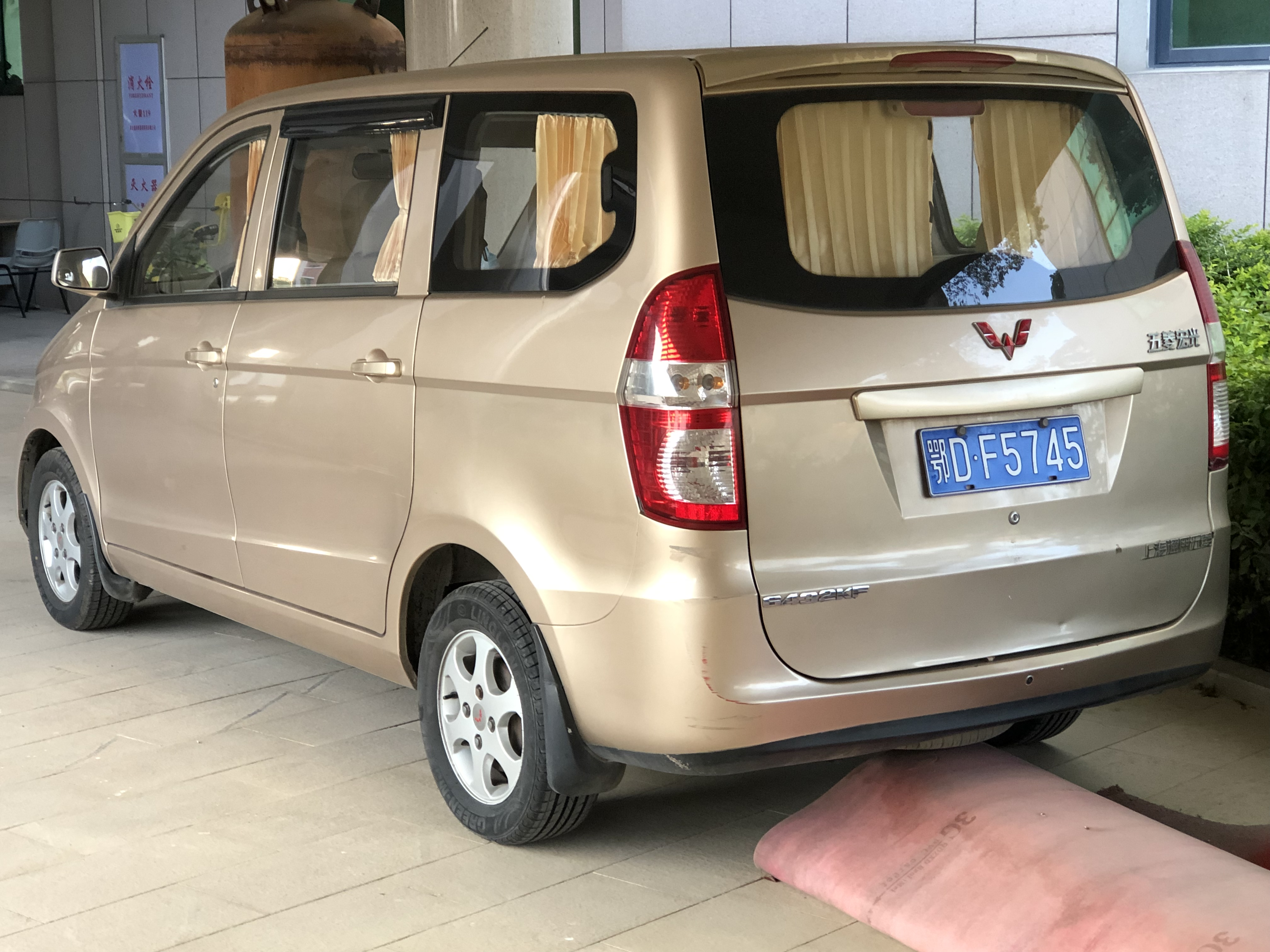
Rear view

The first generation Wuling Hongguang compact MPV was launched in 2010, and several variants have been launched using the same platform including the Wuling Hongguang S1, Wuling Hongguang S3, Wuling Rongguang, and Wuling Rongguang V. It was reported that the Hongguang was the best selling vehicle in China during the first four months of 2014.

In 2013, the Chevrolet Enjoy contained 80% Indian parts.

=== Wuling Hongguang S ===
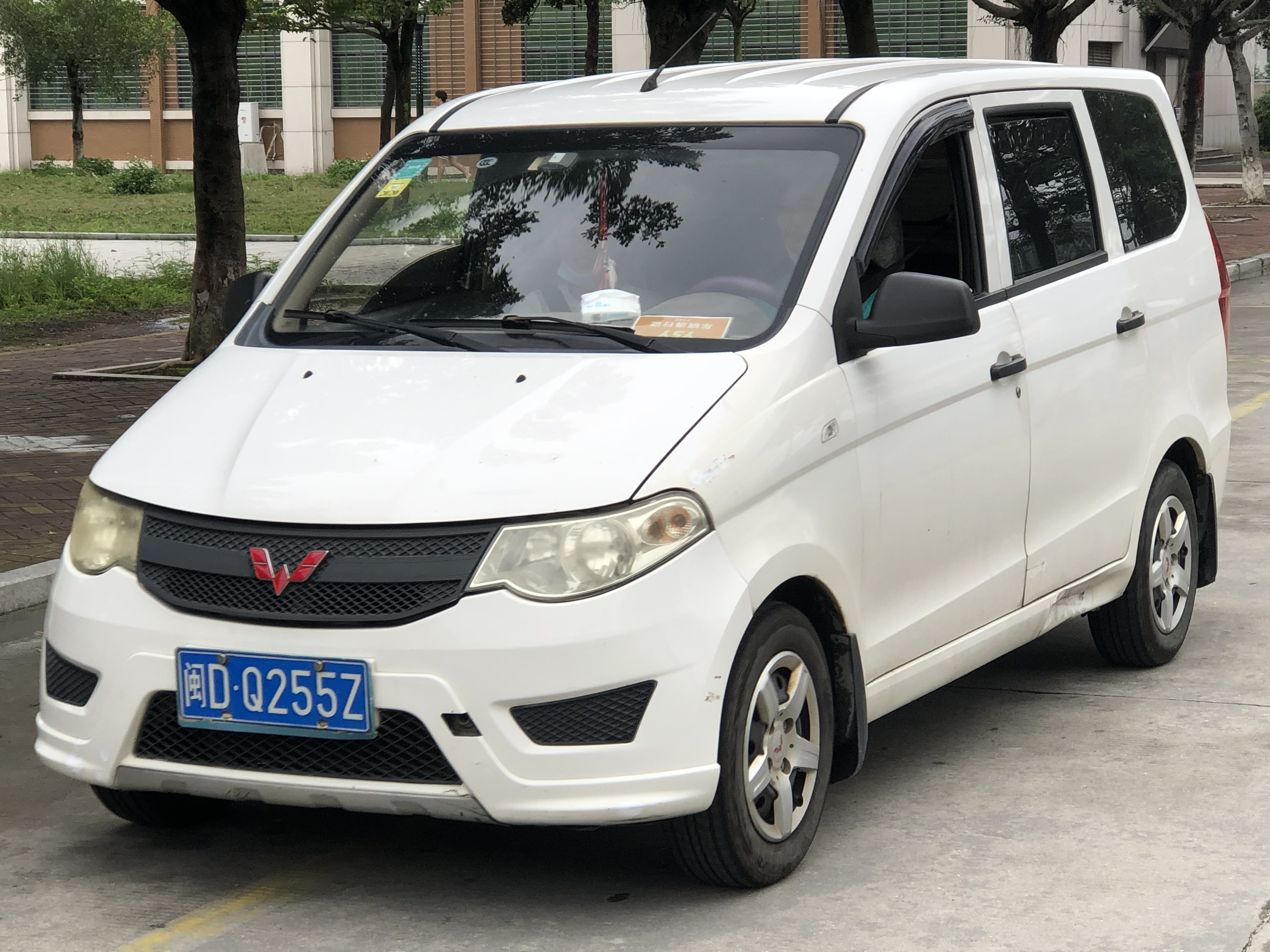
Wuling Hongguang S

Rear view

Other model uses a sporty kit

In August 2013, Wuling launched the Wuling Hongguang S, presenting them not in centers like Shanghai or Beijing, but in the two second-tier cities Harbin in the North-East and Kunming in the South-Western province of Yunnan. The Hongguang S is available with the 1.2 litre LMU and later the LMH and 1.5 litre L2B engine paired to a 5 speed manual gearbox. Three trim levels were offered, which are 1.2 L manual

Basic, 1.5 L manual Basic and 1.5 L manual Standard. The Hongguang S is available with 5, 7 or 8 seater configurations. It is still available for purchase on the SAIC-GM-Wuling website as of 2019 as the Hongguang S Classic.

=== Wuling Hongguang V ===
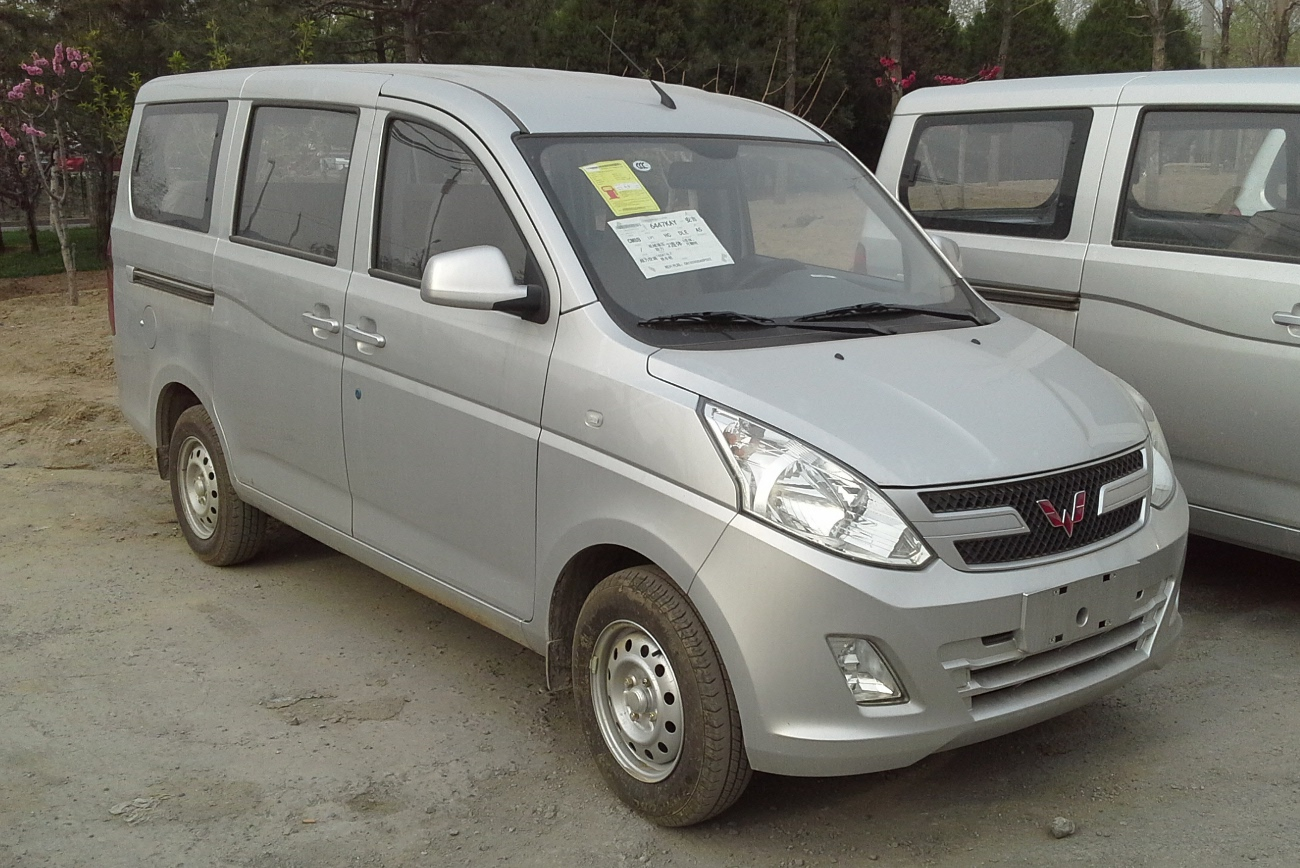
Wuling Hongguang V

A redesigned version of the van with sliding doors called Wuling Hongguang V was launched previously, and later was renamed to Wuling Rongguang V to be sold under the Wuling Rongguang series.

=== Safety ===
The Indian-market Chevrolet Enjoy is notorious for its poor safety. With neither airbags nor an anti-lock braking system it received 0 stars for adult occupants and 2 stars for toddlers from Global NCAP 1.0 in 2017 (similar to Latin NCAP 2013).

Global NCAP 1.0 test results (India) Chevrolet Enjoy – No Airbags (2017, similar to Latin NCAP 2013)
Test	Score	Stars
Adult occupant protection	0.00/17.00	0 /5 stars
Child occupant protection	13.86/49.00	2 /5 stars

== Second generation (2018) ==
Second generation
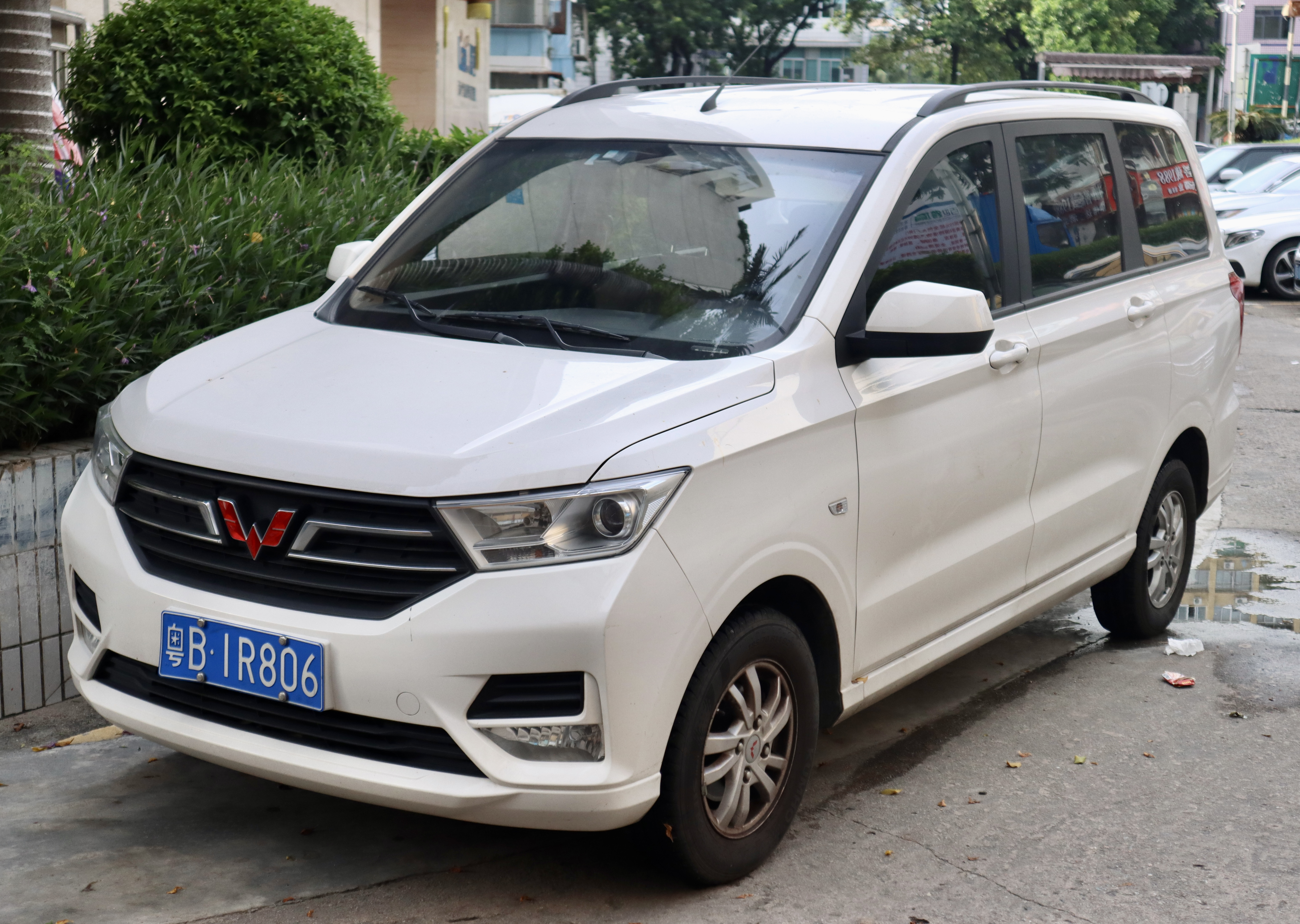

Overview
- Model code: CN115
- Also called: Wuling Hongguang S
- Production: 2018–present
- Assembly: China: Liuzhou, Guangxi

Body and chassis
- Layout: Longitudinal front-engine, rear-wheel drive

Powertrain
- Engine: Petrol: 1.5 L L2B I4; 1.5 L LAR I4; 1.5 L LJ0 I4 turbo
- Transmission: 5-speed manual 6-speed manual

Dimensions
- Wheelbase: 2,720 mm (107.1 in)
- Length: 4,420 mm (174.0 in)
- Width: 1,685 mm (66.3 in)
- Height: 1,755–1,770 mm (69.1–69.7 in)
- Curb weight: 1,215–1,275 kg (2,679–2,811 lb)

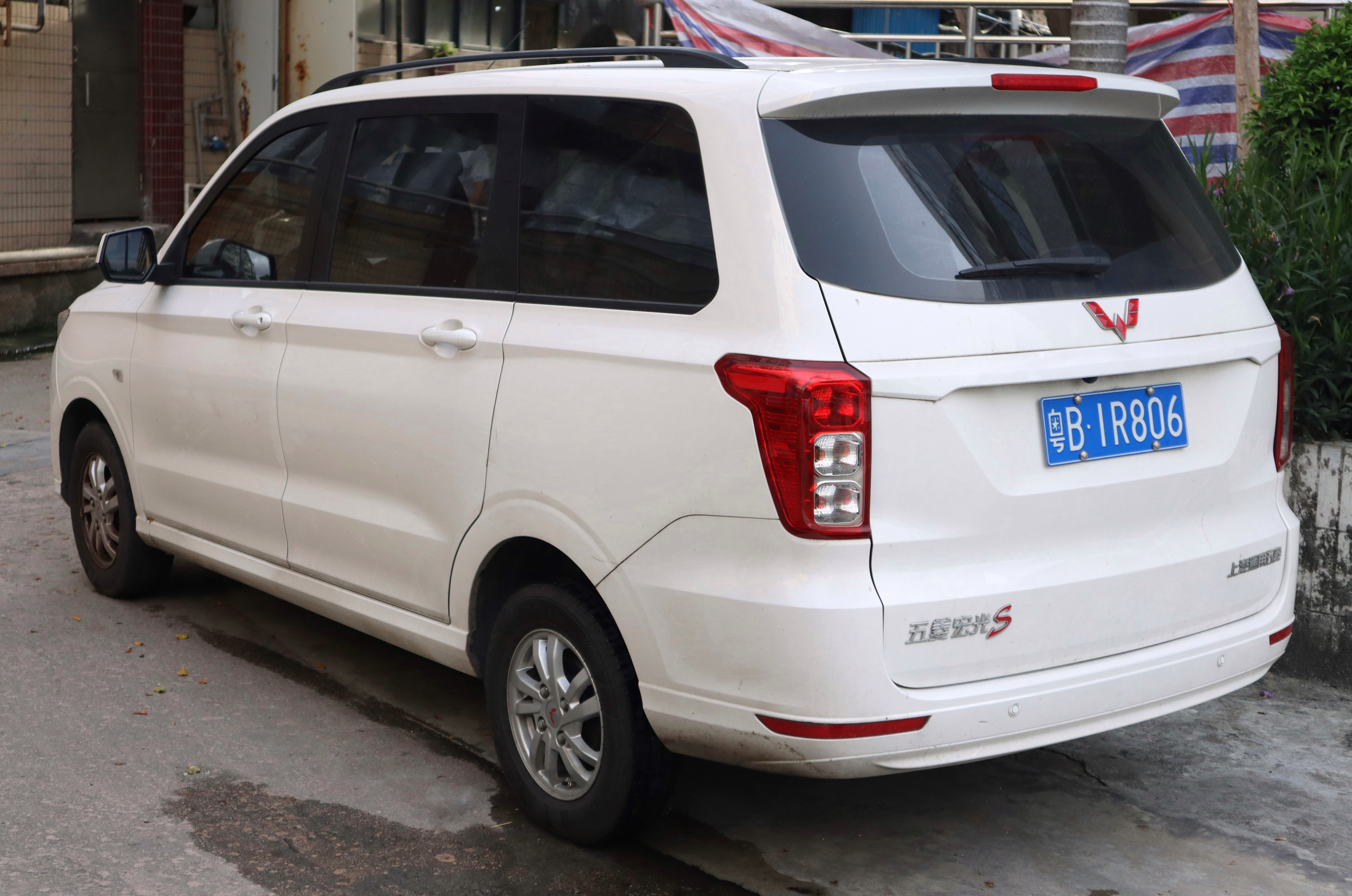
Rear view

The second generation Wuling Hongguang S was launched in 2018, and marketed as Xin Hongguang, meaning "New Hongguang". While the first generation Wuling Hongguang S was sold alongside as the Wuling Hongguang S Classic, the entry version of the Wuling Hongguang was simply discontinued

The second generation Hongguang uses the 1.5 litre L2B that is also found in the first generation Hongguang and uses a 5-speed manual gearbox like its predecessor. Three trim levels are available for the second generation Hongguang and are known as: Basic, Standard and Comfort. Compared to its predecessor, the second generation Hongguang S is 20 millimetres longer, narrower and taller and has the same 2,720 mm (107.1 in) wheelbase.

== Third generation (2024) ==
Third generation
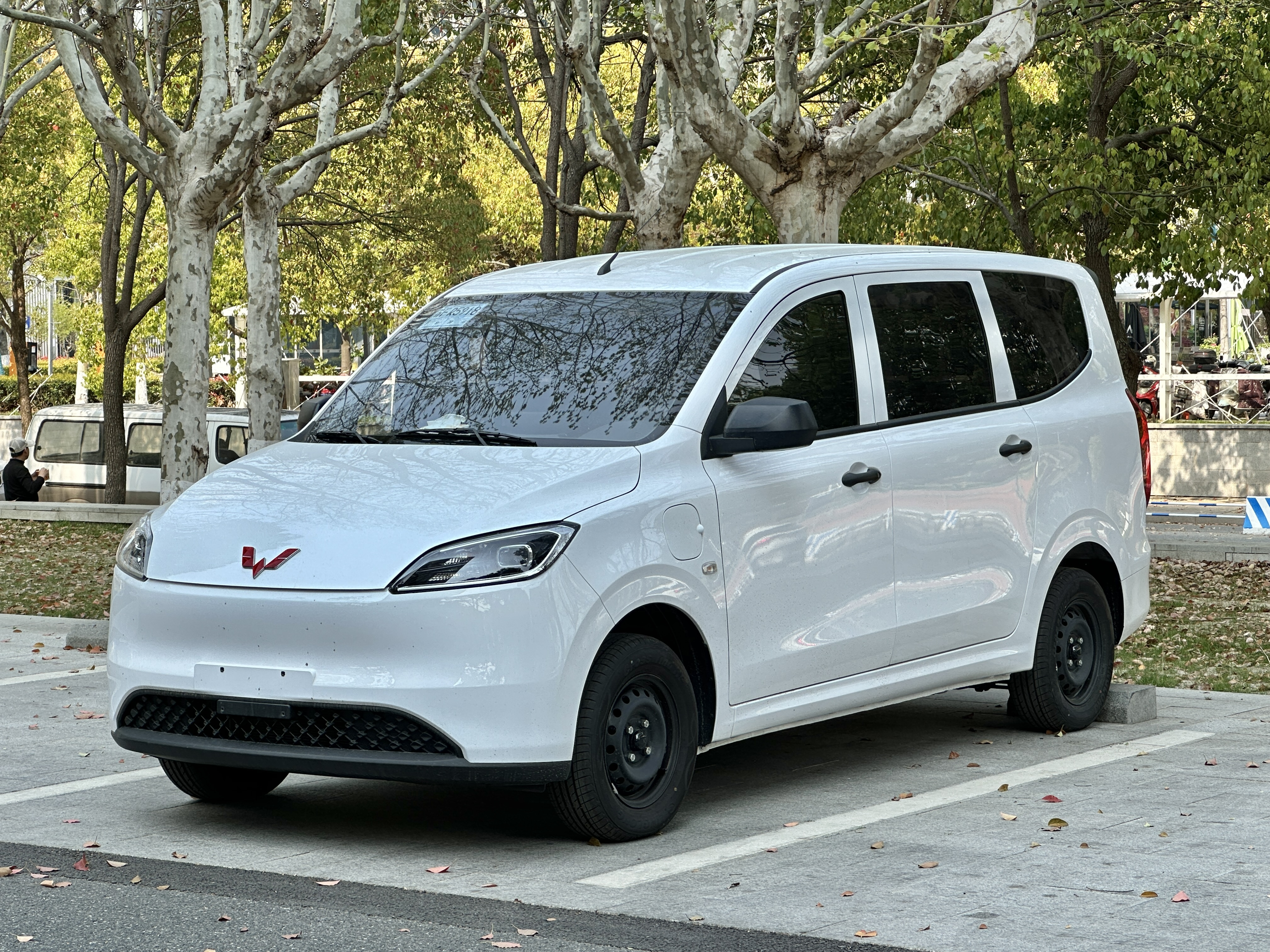
- Wuling Hongguang EV

Overview
- Also called: Wuling Grango (export)
- Production: 2024–present

Body and chassis
- Layout: Rear-motor, rear-wheel drive; Front engine, rear-motor, rear-wheel drive

Powertrain
- Engine: Petrol: 1.5 L LBH I4
- Electric motor: 75 kW permanent magnet synchronous
- Power output: 100 hp (75 kW; 100 PS)
- Hybrid drivetrain: Range extender series hybrid
- Battery: 8.6 kWh LFP Ningfu New Energy; 32.6 kWh LFP Gotion
- Range: 1,000 km (620 mi) (EREV)
- Electric range: 300 km (190 mi) (EV); 50 km (31 mi) (EREV)

Dimensions
- Wheelbase: 2,850 mm (112 in)
- Length: 4,515 mm (177.8 in)
- Width: 1,725 mm (67.9 in)
- Height: 1,790 mm (70 in)
- Curb weight: 1,215–1,275 kg (2,679–2,811 lb)

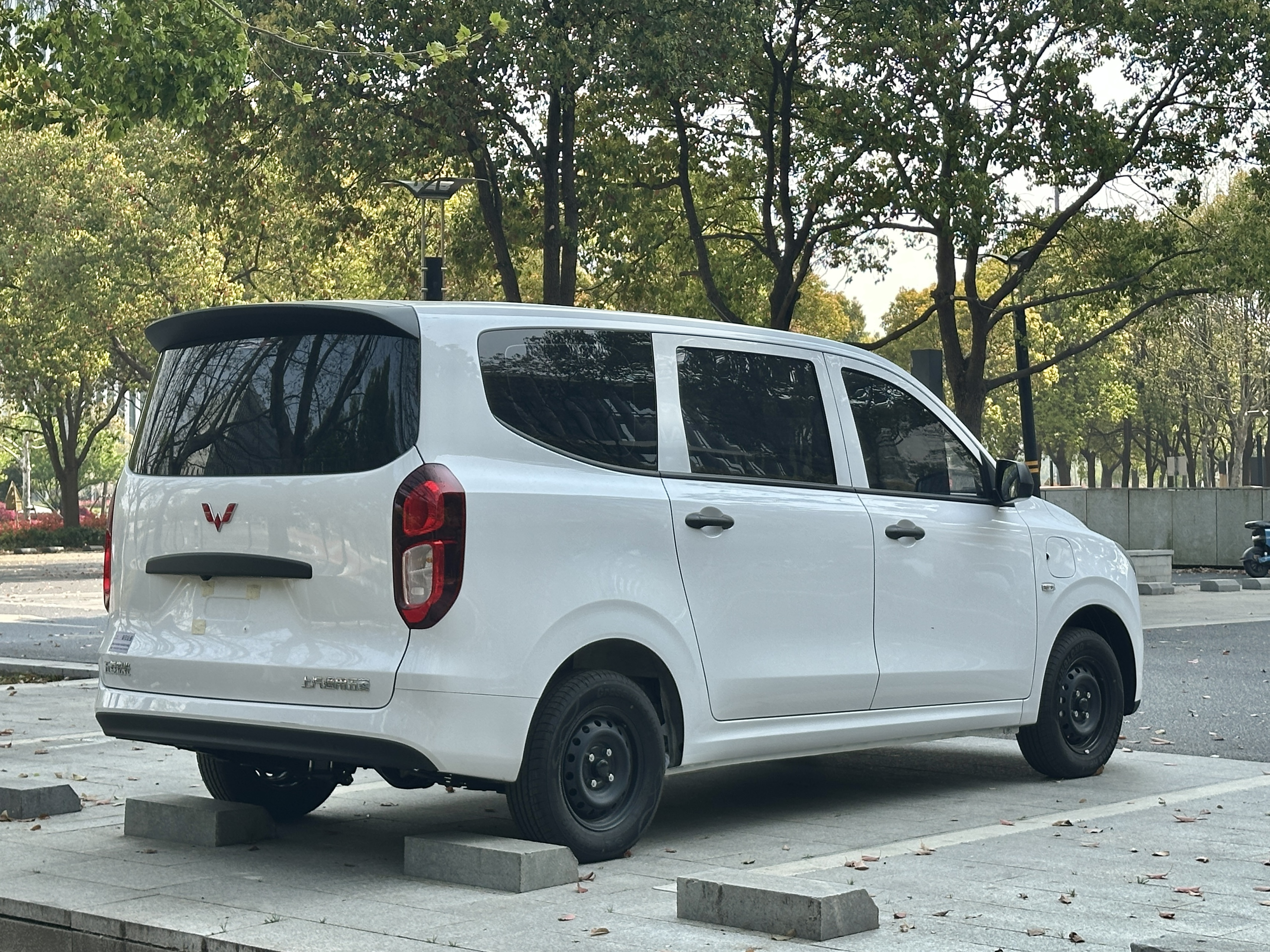
Rear view

The third generation of the Hongguang was sold as the Wuling Hongguang NEV alongside the regular ICE-powered second generation model. It was initially launched as an electric vehicle only, with pre-orders opening on 6 September 2024 and deliveries beginning later that year. A cheaper range-extender variant was launched on 8 April 2025.

It is available as either a two-row five-seater or a three-row six-seater. It has slightly larger dimensions compared to the previous generation, with the wheelbase increased by 10 mm (0.39 in) to 2,850 mm (112.2 in), overall length increased by 95 mm (3.7 in) to 4,515 mm (177.8 in), width increased by 40 mm (1.6 in), and height increased to 1,790 mm (70.5 in). 56% of its chassis is made from high-strength steel.

The exterior has several design changes, including a round front bumper with a lower air intake, which has a matrix mesh pattern grille that is closed off on EV models, a different headlight design, 14-inch steel wheels, different door panels, a rising beltline behind the C-pillar, and a squared-off rear with rectangular taillights. Wuling says that it has made 14 aerodynamic enhancements to reduce drag, resulting in a drag coefficient of 0.32C_{d} which is 15% lower than the previous generation. It is available in three paint colours: Polar White, Clear Sky Silver, and Tungsten Steel Grey.

The dashboard has an analog instrument cluster supplemented by a small information display, a flat-bottom three-spoke steering wheel, a set of climate control knobs, a radio with a segmented LCD, and rectangular air vents with chrome surrounds. An optional 8-inch touchscreen infotainment system with Bluetooth capabilities and rearview camera is available to replace the radio. The center console features a rotary shifter, a manual handbrake, and two cupholders. It comes standard with power front windows, one USB port, and two speakers. Optional features include a remote key fob, one-touch power driver's window, power rear windows, power mirror adjustment, front passenger airbag, speed-sensing automatic door locks, rear HVAC vents, ultrasonic parking sensors, and a 12-volt power supply. The second row of the 5-seat version can be folded, while all three rows of the 6-seat version are folding, allowing for up to 2.8 m^{3} (99 cu ft; 2,800 L) of cargo space. It is equipped with ABS and EBD as standard, and has an optional driver's airbag.

=== Powertrain ===
The third generation Hongguang was initially only available with the BEV powertrain when it launched in late 2024, which was followed by a range-extender (EREV) version in April 2025.

==== EV ====
The Hongguang EV has a single powertrain configuration: a single rear-wheel drive hairpin bar-wound motor outputting 75 kW (101 hp; 102 PS) and 180 N⋅m (133 lb⋅ft) of torque, with a top speed of 135 km/h (84 mph). Power is supplied by a 32.6 kWh LFP battery pack allowing for a 300-kilometre (190 mi) CLTC range rating. It is capable of DC fast charging from 30–80% in 30 minutes, or AC charging from a standard wall outlet from 20–100% in 9.8 hours.

==== EREV ====
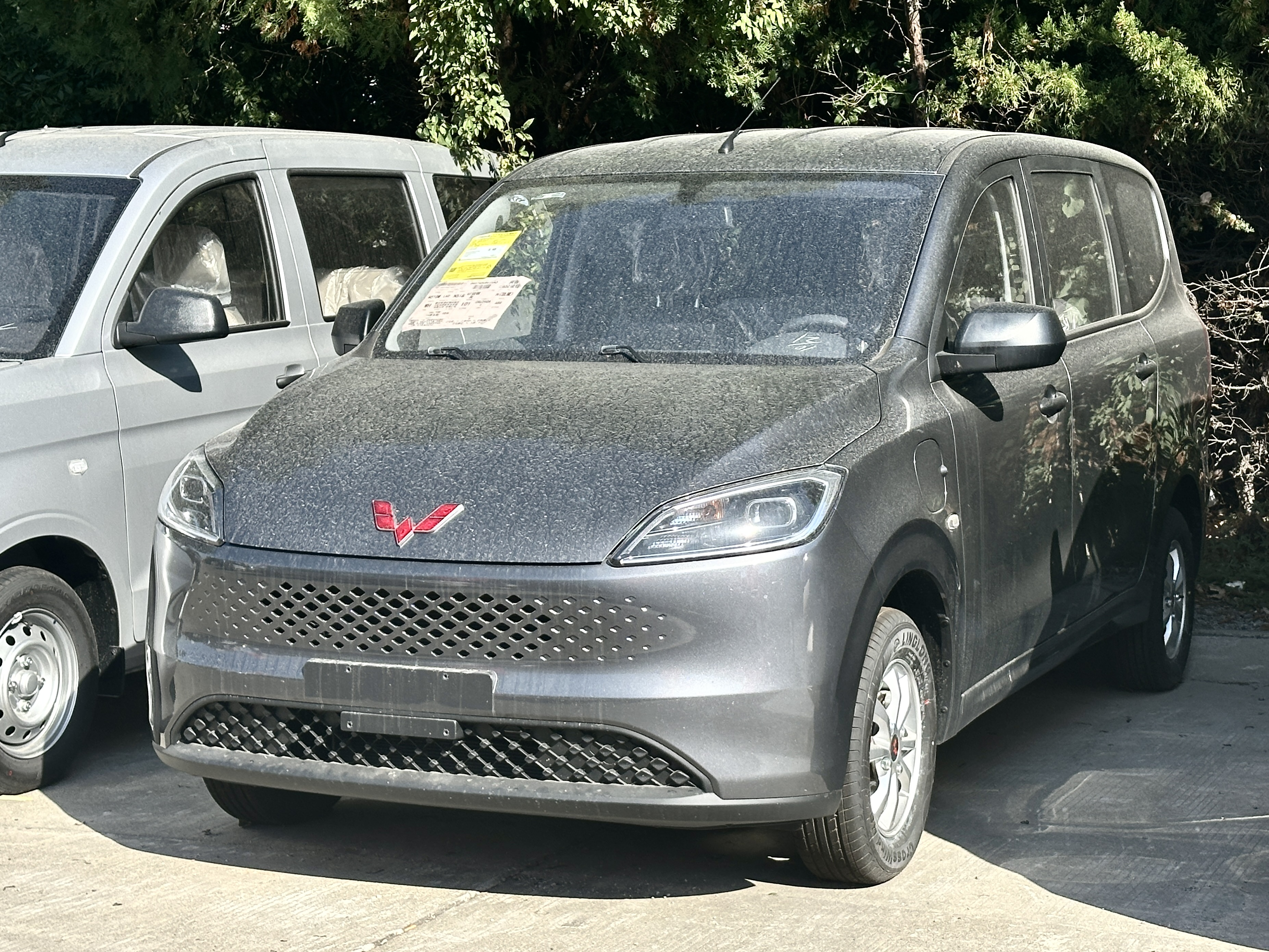
Wuling Hongguang EREV

The range-extender version consists of a 1.5-liter Atkinson cycle four-cylinder petrol engine outputting 98 hp (73 kW; 99 PS) and 125 N⋅m (92 lb⋅ft) of torque powering the same 75 kW rear motor as the EV version, for a top speed of 135 km/h (84 mph). It has a 8.5 kWh LFP battery pack, allowing for 50 kilometres (31 mi) of electric range and a combined range of 1,000 kilometres (620 mi), and an NEDC rating of 4.3 L/100 km (55 mpg_{‑US}) when the battery is discharged. It is capable of DC fast charging from 30–80% in 30 minutes.

=== Markets ===
==== Vietnam ====
The Wuling Grango was launched in Vietnam on 16 July 2026, in the sole variant using the 32.6 kWh lithium-ion battery pack.

== Sales ==
Hongguang S
Year	China
2023	87,359
2024	82,811
2025	69,370

Hongguang NEV
Year	China		
Year	EREV	EV	Total
2024	—	13,431	
2025	13,676	34,508	69,370

== Other versions ==
=== Wuling Hongguang S1 ===
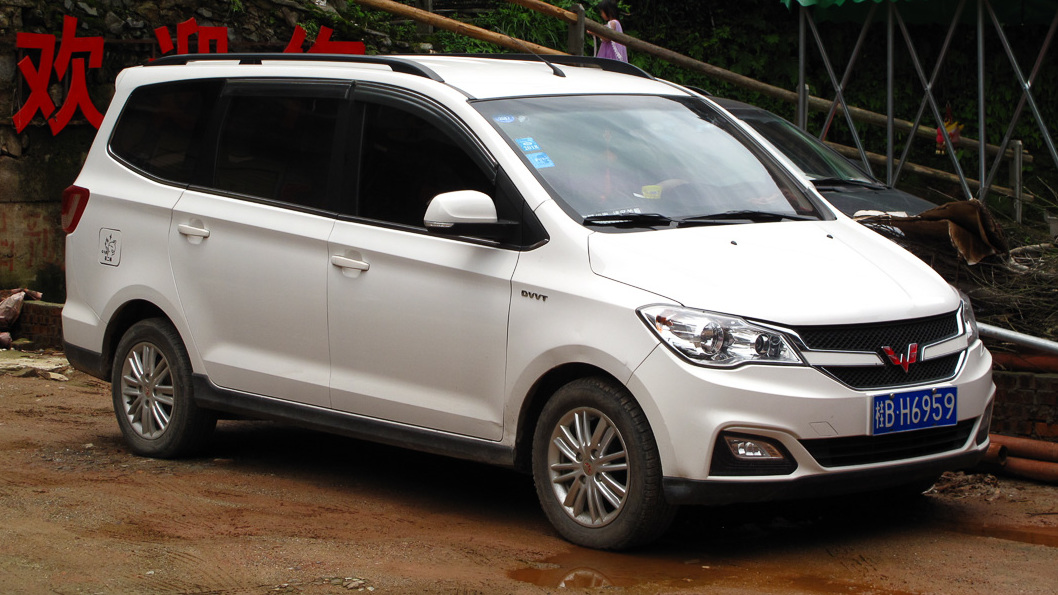
Wuling Hongguang S1

The Wuling Hongguang S1 is an upmarket version of the Hongguang MPV line that was produced between 2015 and 2017 in China, and from 2017 to date in Indonesia as the Wuling Confero and Wuling Formo.

=== Wuling Hongguang S3 ===
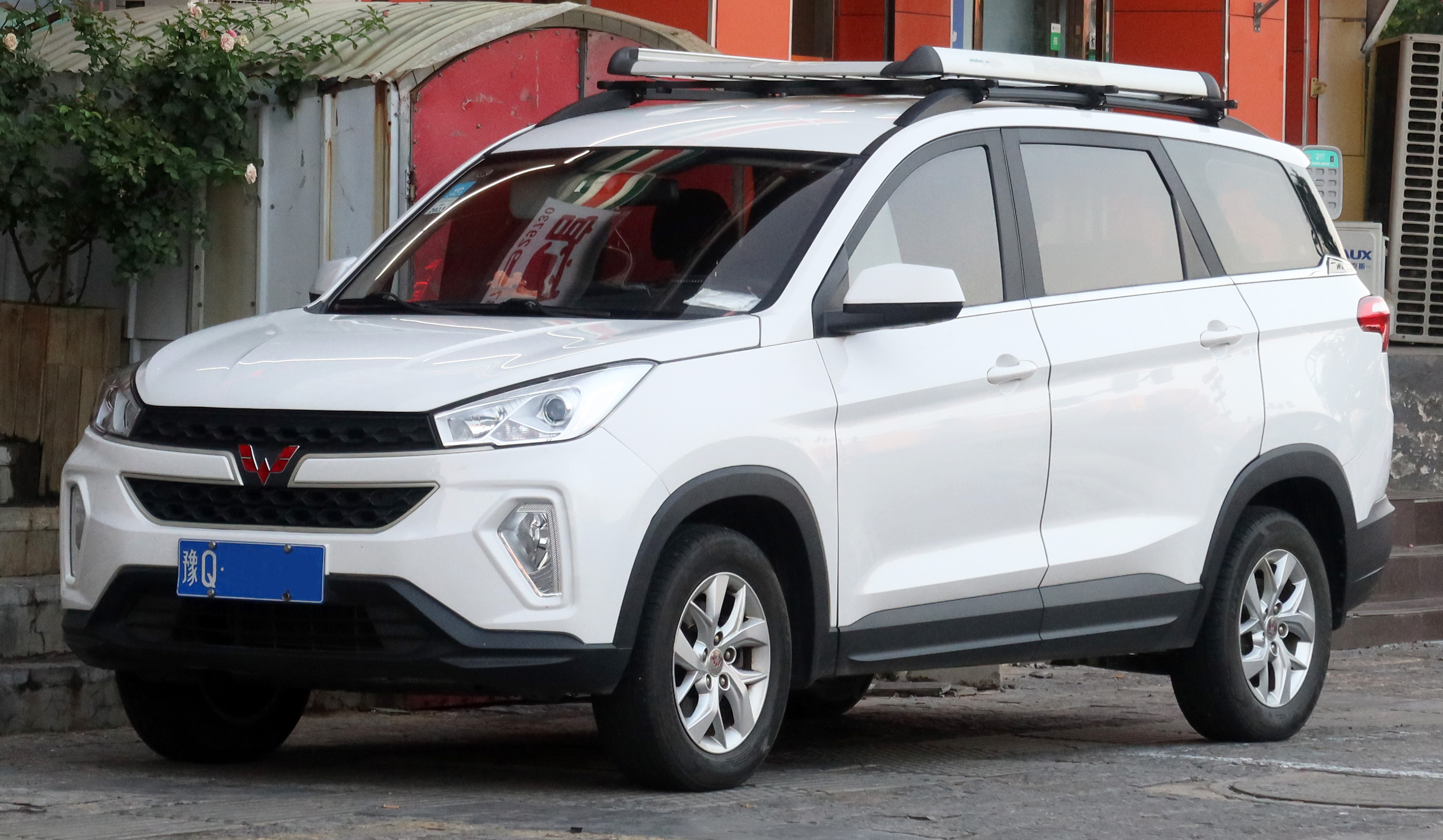
Wuling Hongguang S3

The Wuling Hongguang S3 is a crossover SUV based on the Hongguang MPV platform produced since 2017.

=== Wuling Hongguang Plus ===
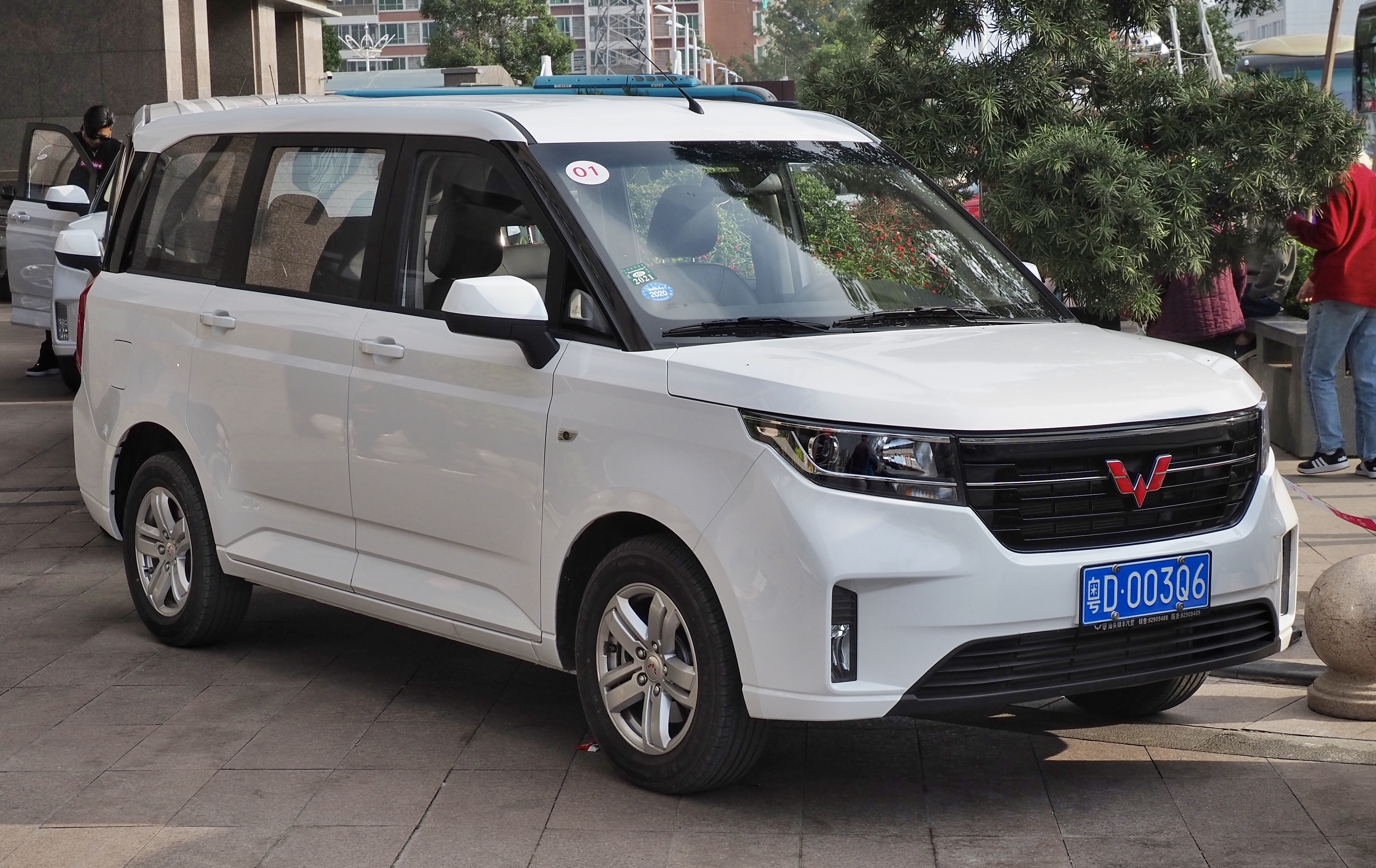
Wuling Hongguang Plus

A larger and more upmarket variant based on a different platform was revealed in 2019 called the Wuling Hongguang Plus, featuring different exterior and interior designs.
