= General Motors India (disambiguation) =

General Motors India is the subsidiary of General Motors of the United States. The following are the pages related to the company in India:

- General Motors India Private Limited, the subsidiary of General Motors in India
- Opel India Private Limited, Opel in India
- Chevrolet Sales India Private Limited, Chevrolet in India
