= Wuling Hongguang S3 =

Compact SUV

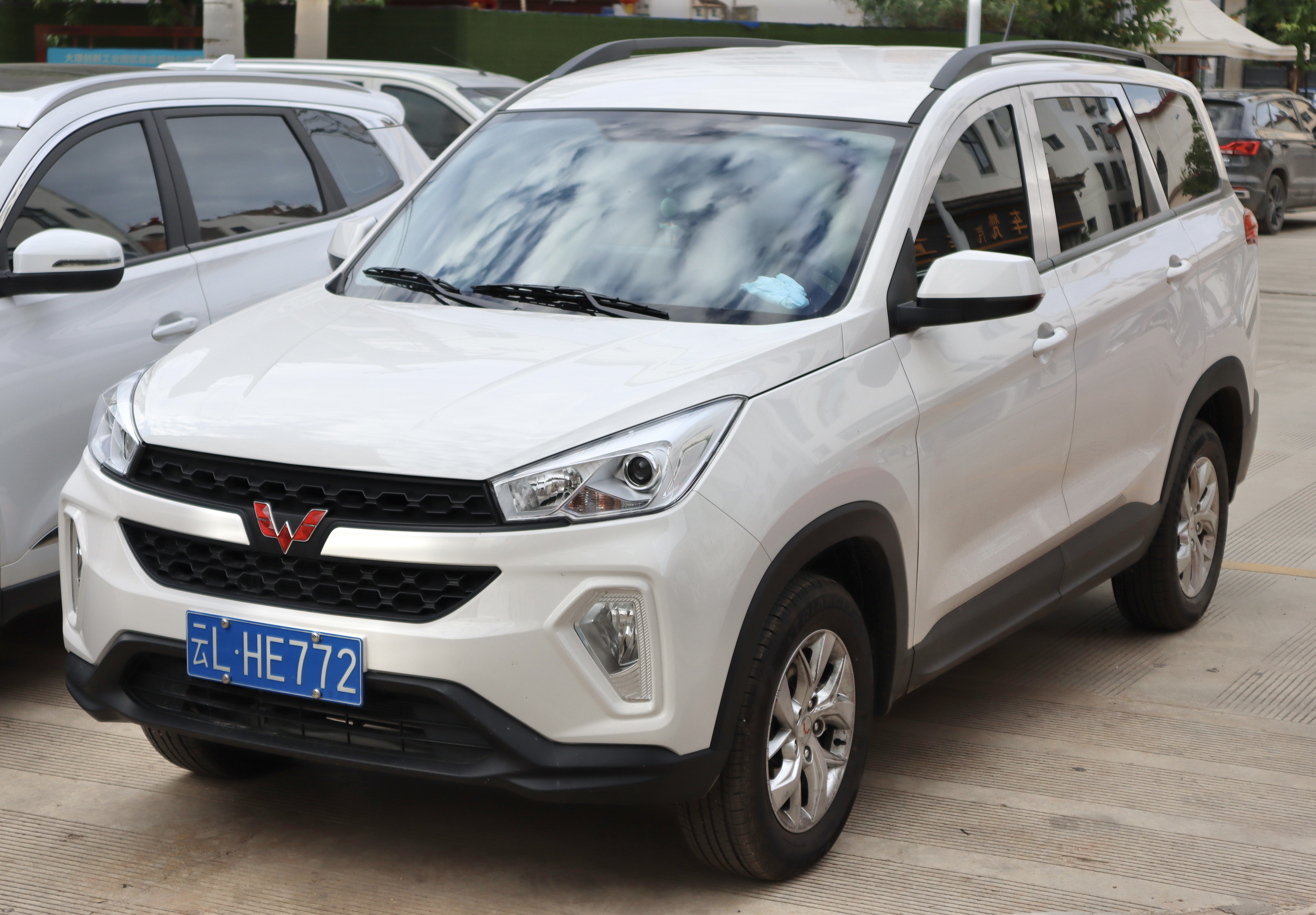

Overview
- Manufacturer: SAIC-GM-Wuling
- Model code: CN120S
- Production: 2017–present
- Assembly: China: Liuzhou, Guangxi

Body and chassis
- Class: Compact SUV
- Body style: 5-door SUV
- Layout: Longitudinal front-engine, rear-wheel-drive

Powertrain
- Engine: Petrol: 1.5 L L2B I4; 1.5 L LL5 I4 turbo
- Transmission: 6-speed manual 6-speed semi-automatic (clutch-less manual)

Dimensions
- Wheelbase: 2,800 mm (110.2 in)
- Length: 4,655 mm (183.3 in)
- Width: 1,735 mm (68.3 in)
- Height: 1,790 mm (70.5 in)
- Curb weight: 1,395–1,538 kg (3,075–3,391 lb)

Chronology
- Predecessor: Wuling Hongguang S1

The Wuling Hongguang S3 (Chinese: 五菱宏光S3) is a compact SUV produced by SAIC-GM-Wuling, the joint venture of SAIC Motor, Liuzhou Wuling Motors Co and GM China under the Wuling Hongguang product series.

== Overview ==
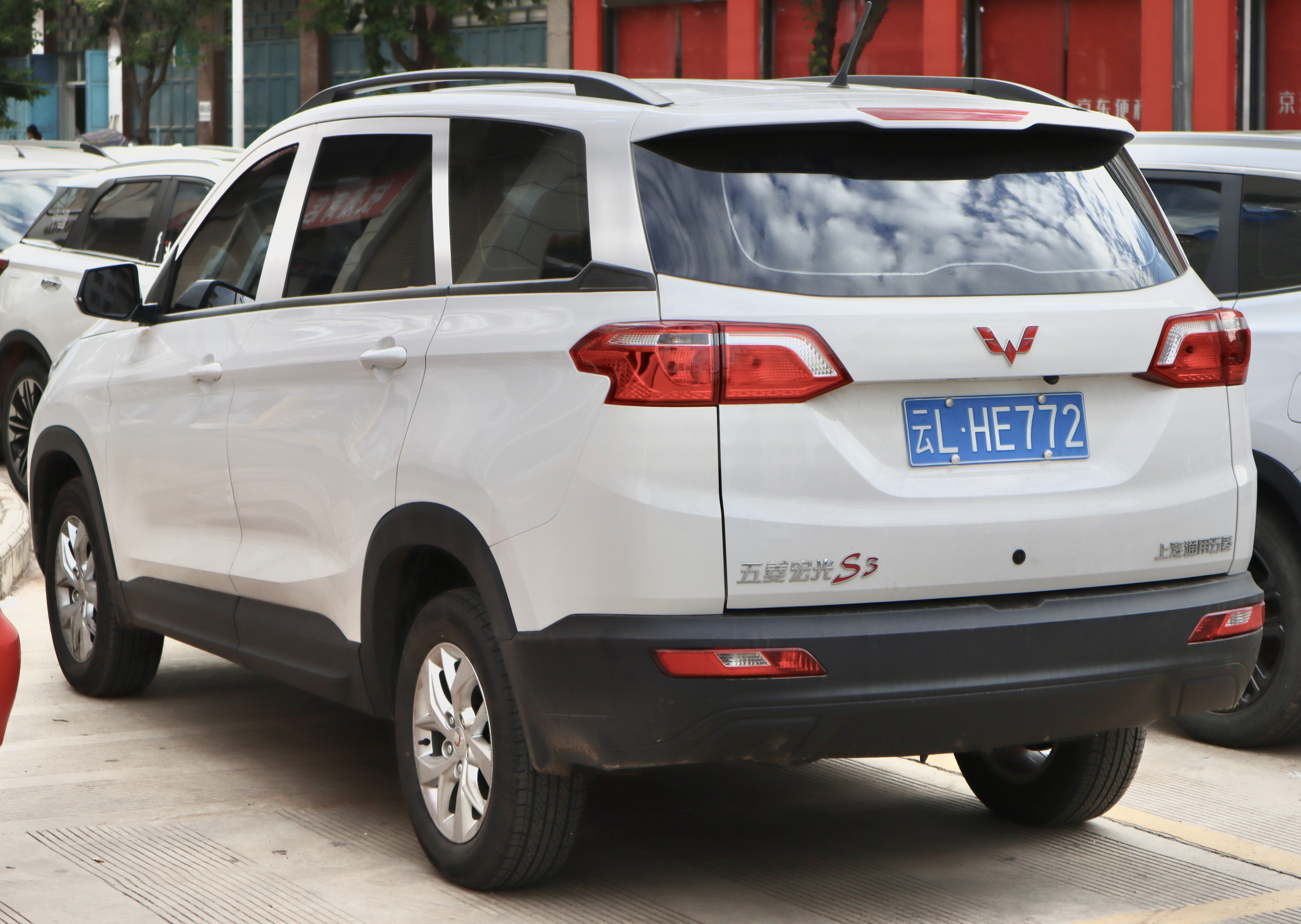
Rear view

The S3 was unveiled during the 2017 Shanghai Auto Show in China. It is powered by a 112 hp (84 kW; 114 PS) 1.5-litre naturally aspirated engine or a 150 hp (112 kW; 152 PS) 1.5-litre turbocharged engine, with each engine mated to a five-speed manual gearbox. As the first SUV of the Wuling brand, it seats seven in a 2-2-3 configuration.

The S3 was aimed at the low end of the market with prices ranging from 56,800 to 81,800 yuan ($9,012 – 12,778).

== Sales ==
Year	China
2023	15,023
2024	17,635
2025	6,824

== See also ==
- Wuling Hongguang S1, the compact MPV that shares the same platform positioned slightly below the Wuling Hongguang S3
