= Wuling Hongguang S1 =

Compact multi-purpose vehicle

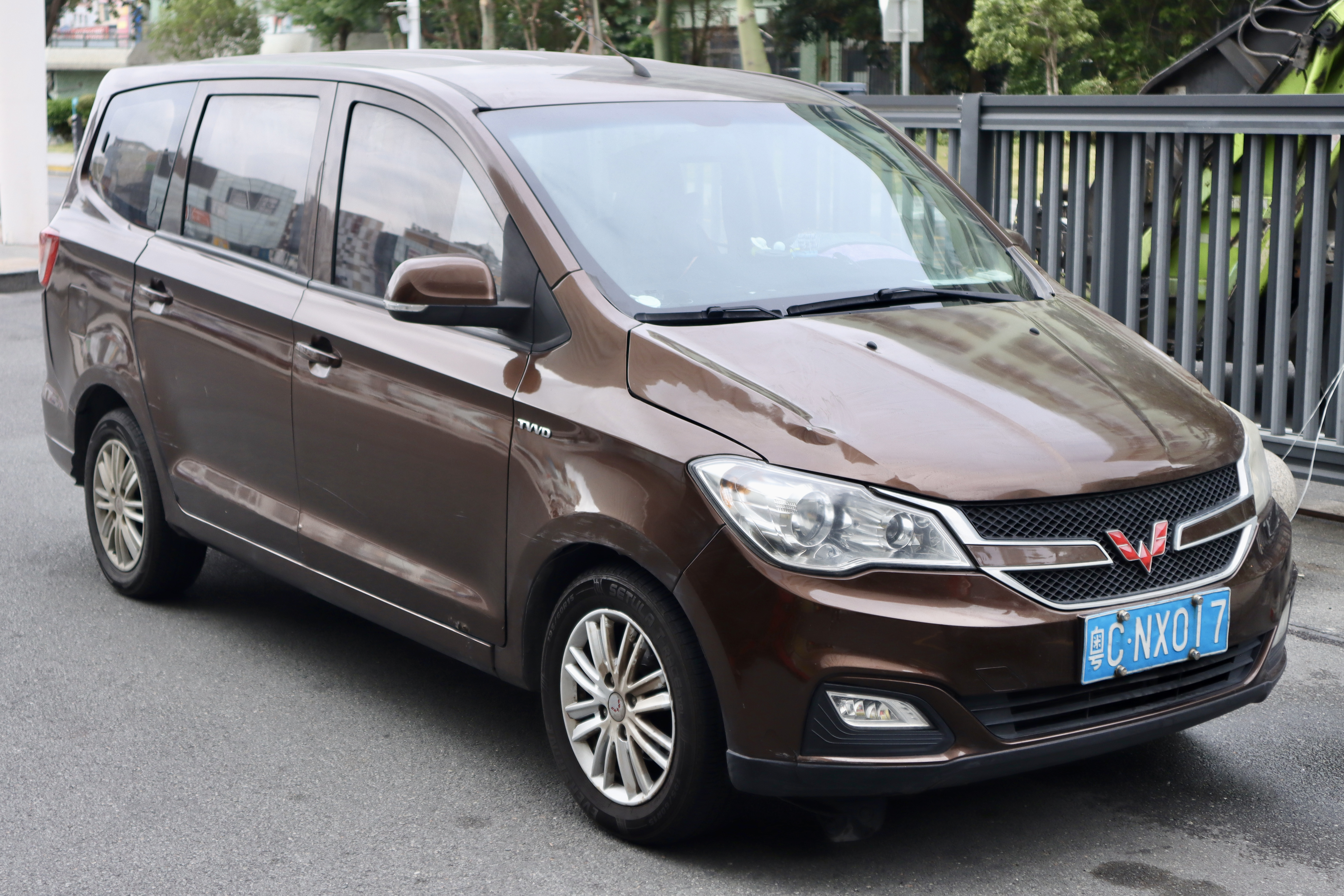
- 2015 Wuling Hongguang S1 (China)

Overview
- Manufacturer: SAIC-GM-Wuling
- Model code: CN113
- Also called: Wuling Confero (Indonesia); Wuling Formo (van/panel van, Indonesia); Wuling Formo Max (pickup, Indonesia)
- Production: 2015–2017 (China); 2017–present (Indonesia)
- Assembly: China: Liuzhou, Guangxi (SAIC-GM-Wuling); Indonesia: Cikarang, West Java (SGMW Indonesia)
- Designer: Chen Ming, Dong Xinwen and Zhang Wenjun; Huang Hai, Lin Wen and Xie Ying (interior)

Body and chassis
- Class: Compact MPV; Light commercial vehicle
- Body style: 5-door wagon; 5-door van/panel van (Formo); 2-door pickup (Formo Max)
- Layout: Front-engine, rear-wheel-drive
- Related: Wuling Hongguang (first generation); Wuling Hongguang S3

Powertrain
- Engine: Petrol: 1.2 L LMH I4 I-VVT; 1.5 L L2B (B15) I4 DVVT; 1.5 L LAR I4
- Power output: 1.2 L: 77.5 PS (57 kW) & 110 N⋅m (81 lb⋅ft); 1.5 L: 98 PS (72 kW) & 135 N⋅m (100 lb⋅ft); 1.5 L DVVT: 107 PS (79 kW) & 142 N⋅m (105 lb⋅ft)
- Transmission: 5-speed manual; 6-speed Schaeffler semi-automatic (clutchless manual)

Dimensions
- Wheelbase: 2,720 mm (107.1 in); 3,160 mm (124.4 in) (Formo Max)
- Length: 4,493–4,530 mm (176.9–178.3 in); 5,135 mm (202.2 in) (Formo Max)
- Width: 1,691 mm (66.6 in); 1,725 mm (67.9 in) (Formo Max)
- Height: 1,715–1,730 mm (67.5–68.1 in); 1,740 mm (68.5 in) (Formo Max)
- Kerb weight: 1,260–1,320 kg (2,778–2,910 lb)

Chronology
- Predecessor: Chevrolet Spin (Indonesia)
- Successor: Wuling Hongguang S3 (China)

The Wuling Hongguang S1 (Chinese: 五菱宏光S1) is a compact MPV manufactured by SAIC-GM-Wuling between 2015 and 2017 in China, and since 2017 in Indonesia as the Wuling Confero. A commercial van version was introduced in Indonesia in 2018 as the Wuling Formo and Wuling Formo S for the passenger variant, while a 2-door pickup version was introduced in Indonesia in 2023 as the Wuling Formo Max.

== Overview ==
The Hongguang S1 was launched in China on 20 August 2015 with three trim levels (Standard, Comfort and Luxury) and positioned above the Hongguang and Hongguang S MPVs.

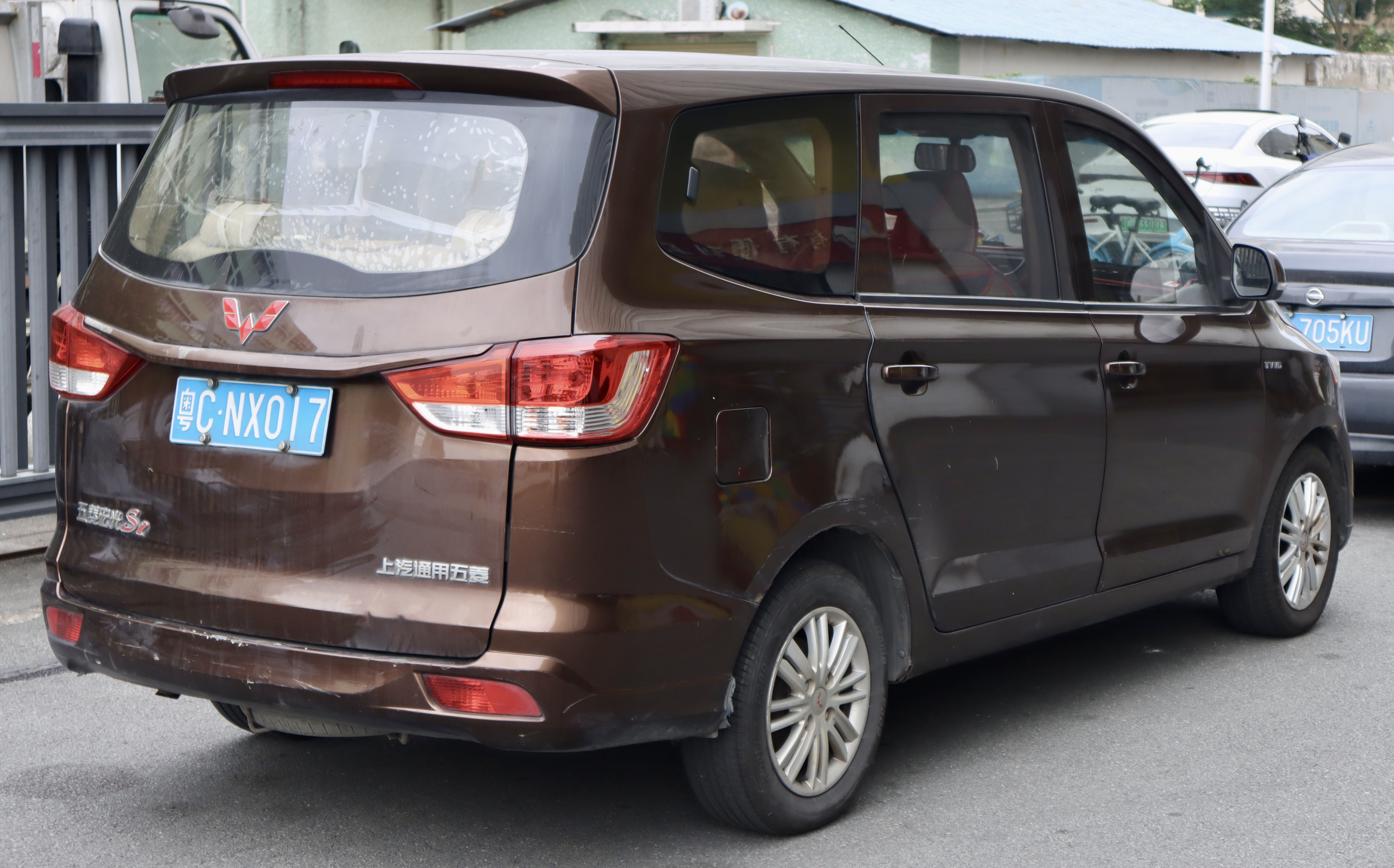
Rear view

=== 2016 facelift ===
On 20 April 2016, a new trim level with different exterior design was launched as Hongguang S1 Exclusive and based on the Luxury trim. Due to low sales, Hongguang S1 was discontinued around early 2017 and it was replaced by Hongguang S3.

Wuling Hongguang S1 2016 facelift

Rear view

== Oversea markets ==
=== Indonesia ===
In Indonesia, the Hongguang S1 is sold by SGMW Indonesia as the Wuling Confero, where it was launched to the public on 2 August 2017. Two variants were launched; Confero that based on the pre-2016 Chinese market Hongguang S1 and Confero S that based on the Hongguang S1 Exclusive. The Confero has gray coloured interior while Confero S has more luxurious dual tone beige-black coloured interior.

A commercial van variant based on Confero with 1.2-litre petrol engine called Wuling Formo, which is available in panel/blind van and 8-seater passenger van/wagon ("minibus"), was launched on 7 November 2018. It has gray or brown coloured interior option.

The name "Confero" is derived from Latin word for "togetherness", while "Formo" means "to form" in the same language.

A new variant called Confero S ACT (Automatic Clutch Transmission) with Schaeffler-developed 6-speed semi-automatic transmission was introduced on 22 April 2019. Minor changes also appeared for all Confero S variants, such as brand new black coloured interior, day/night view center mirror, driver seat high adjuster, emergency stop signal and electric retract mirrors, also the deletion of rear fog lights and HDMI port.

The Confero S received another changes on 10 March 2021. The changes including new sporty front-end design and also the deletion of engine cover (except for ACT trim), headlamps leveling, analog clock (except for L and ACT trims), third row USB port and variable valve timing (except for ACT trim). Facelifted Confero with Formo's front grille and smoked headlights was announced on 3 June 2021. On 22 October 2021, passenger variant of Formo also received the same facelift treatment as Confero. This model is renamed to Formo S and also available as 5-seater variant.

In January 2023, the model gained a pickup body style called the Wuling Formo Max. It is powered by the 1.5-litre engine from the Confero.

=== Brunei ===
The Wuling Confero S in facelifted form has been launched in Brunei on 7 June 2024. Imported from Indonesia, it is offered only in C Lux with 8-seater variant and 1.5-litre petrol engine mated to a 5-speed manual transmission.

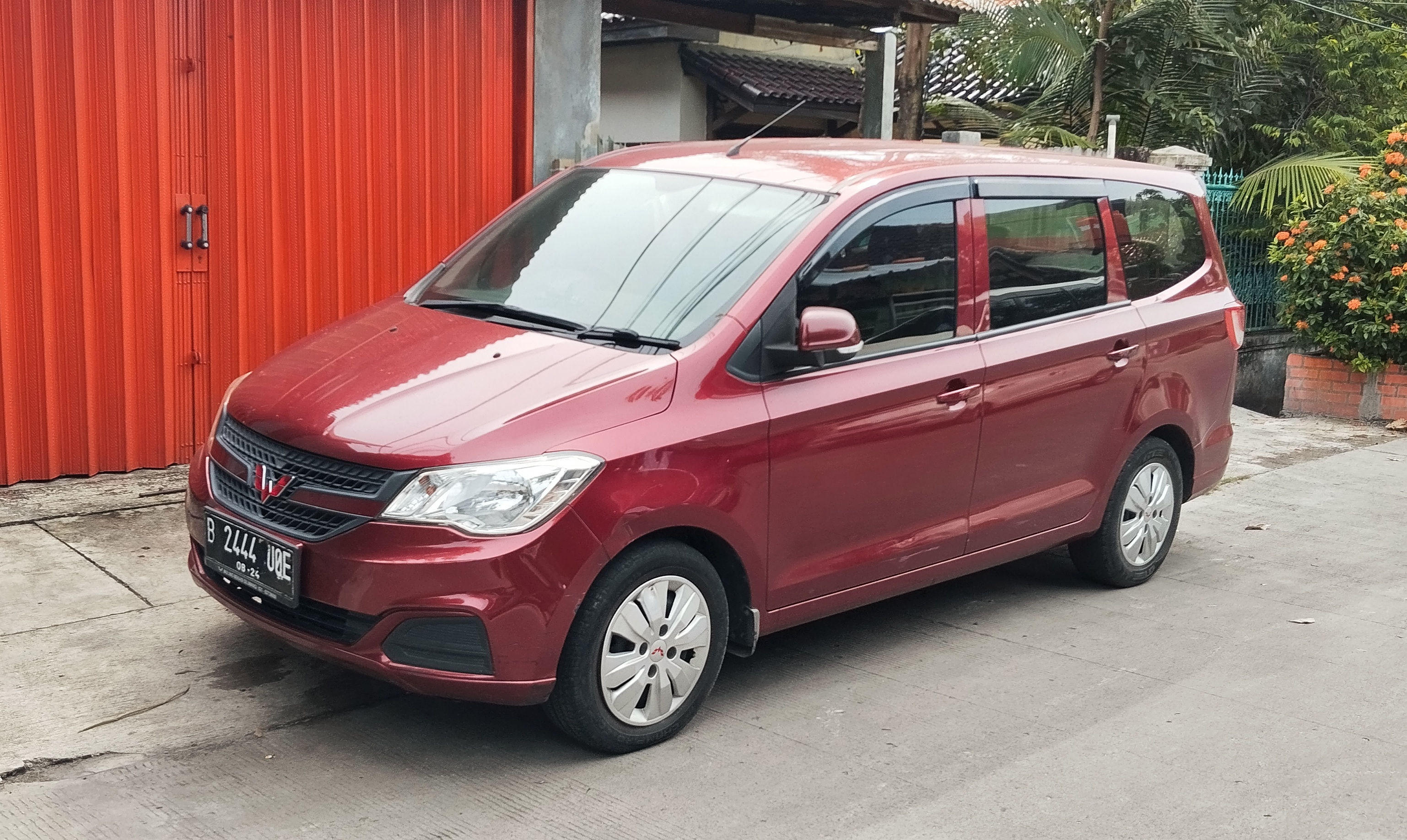
2019 Wuling Confero (pre-facelift; Indonesia)

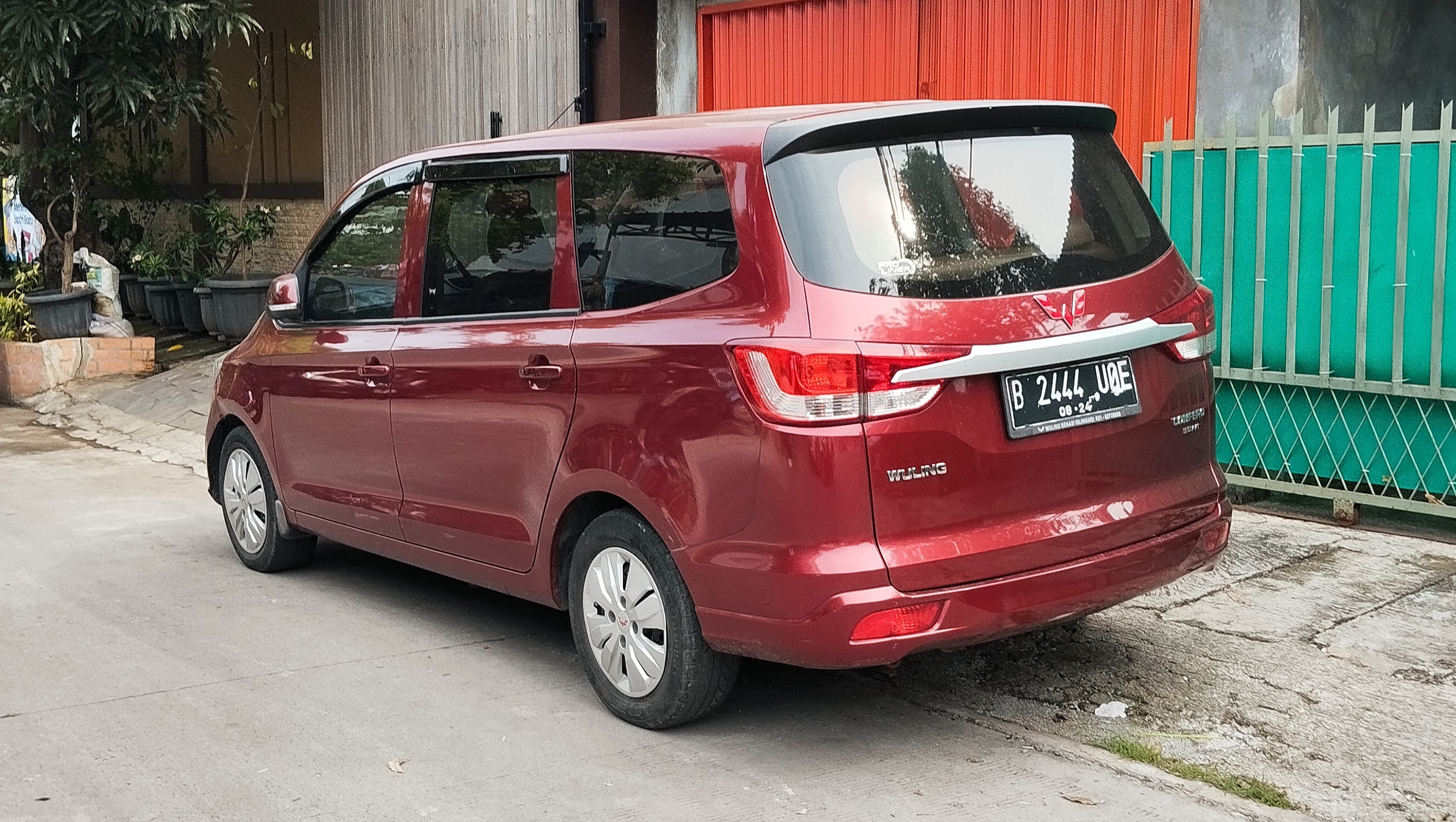
2019 Wuling Confero (pre-facelift; Indonesia)

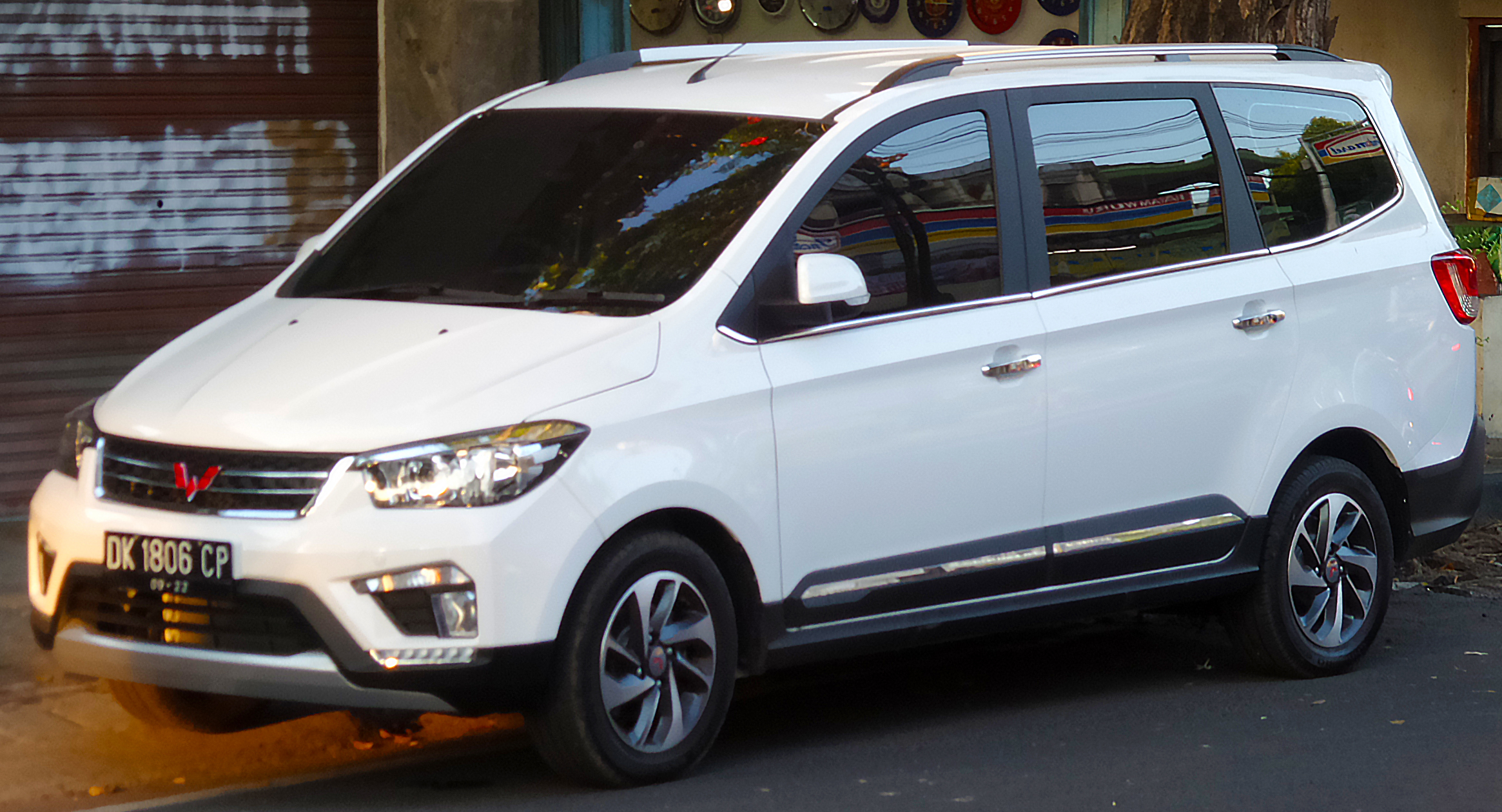
2017 Wuling Confero S L (pre-facelift, Indonesia)

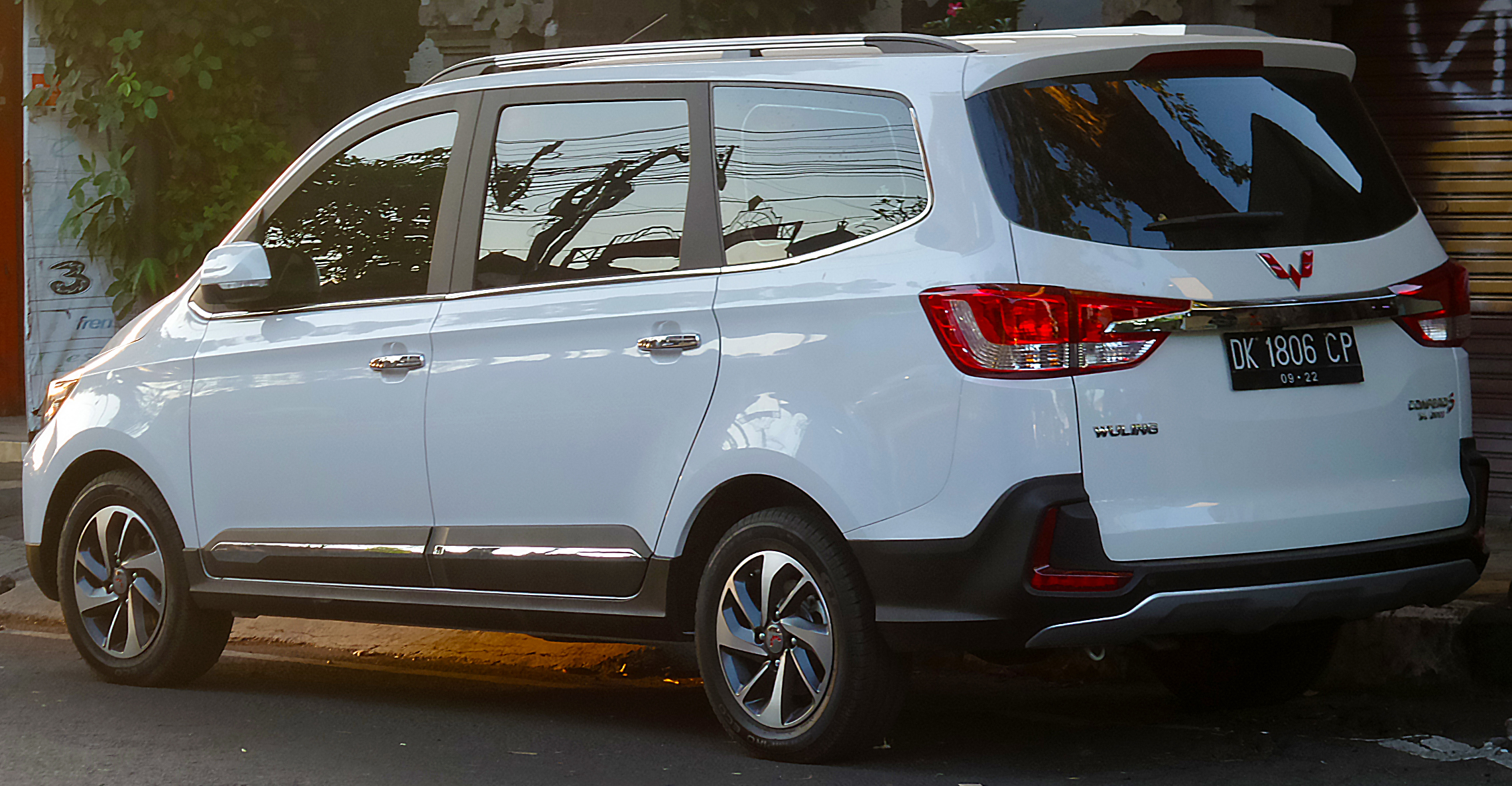
2017 Wuling Confero S L (pre-facelift, Indonesia)

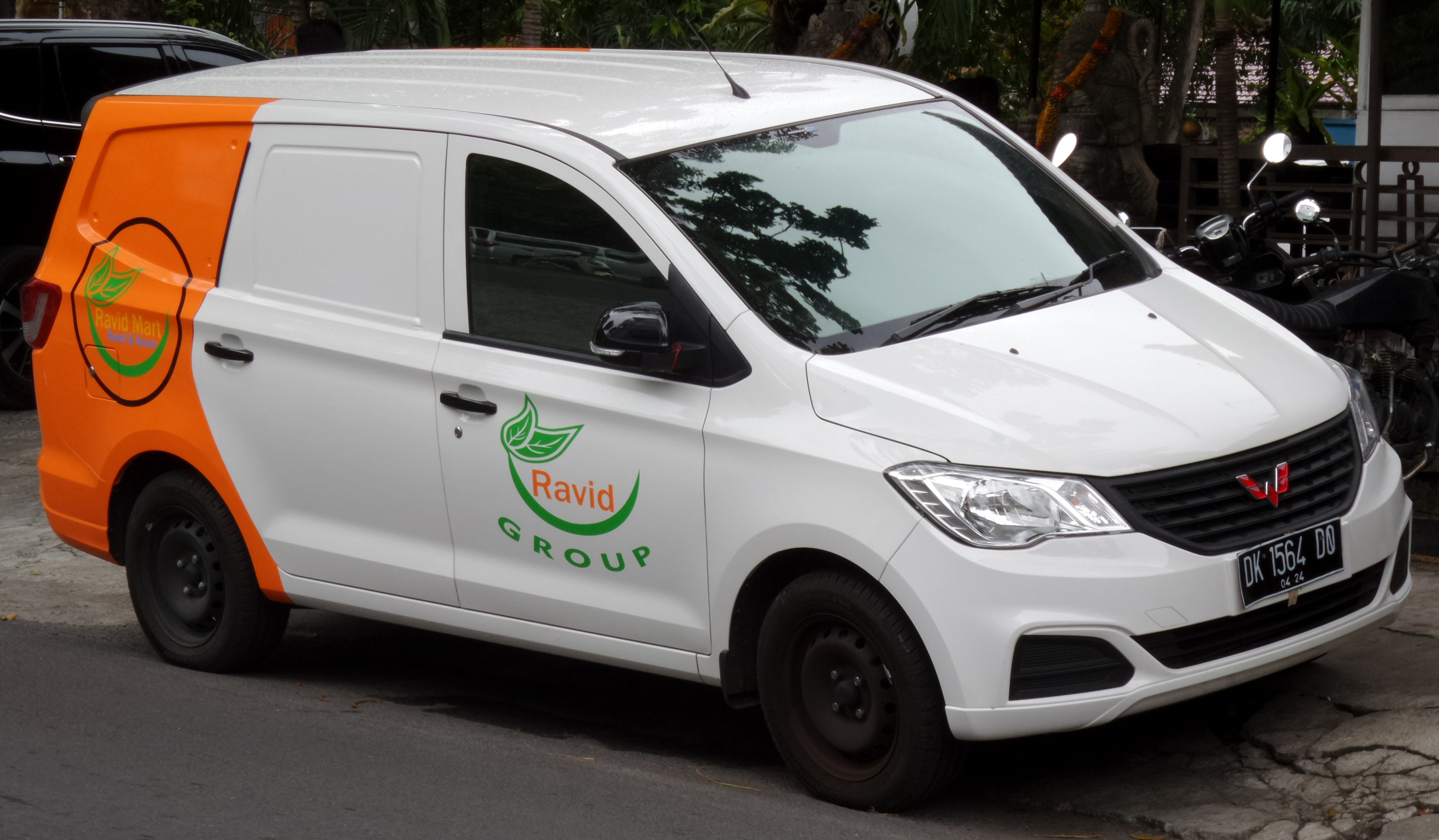
2019 Wuling Formo Blind Van (Indonesia)

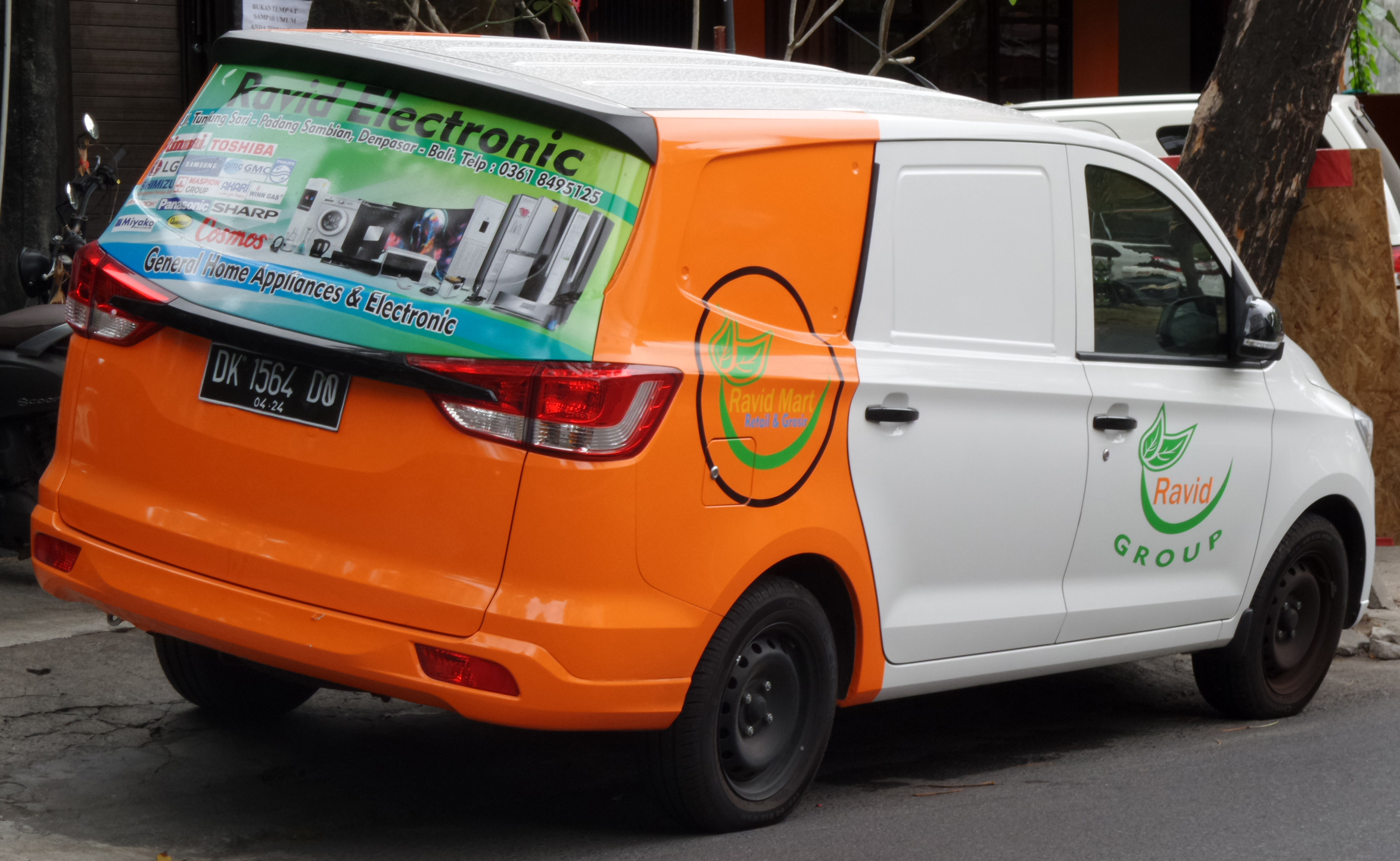
2019 Wuling Formo Blind Van (Indonesia)

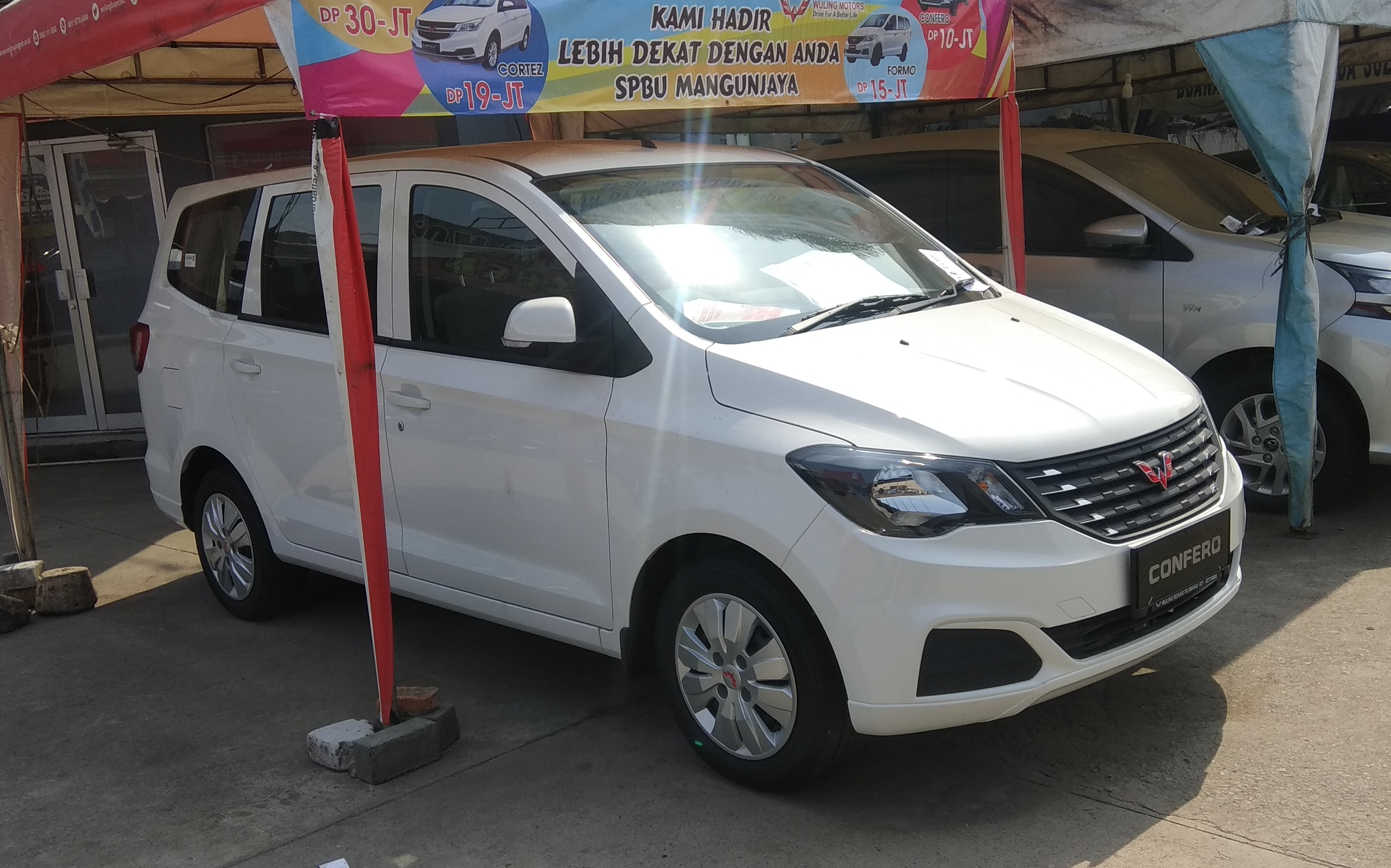
2021 Wuling Confero (facelift; Indonesia)

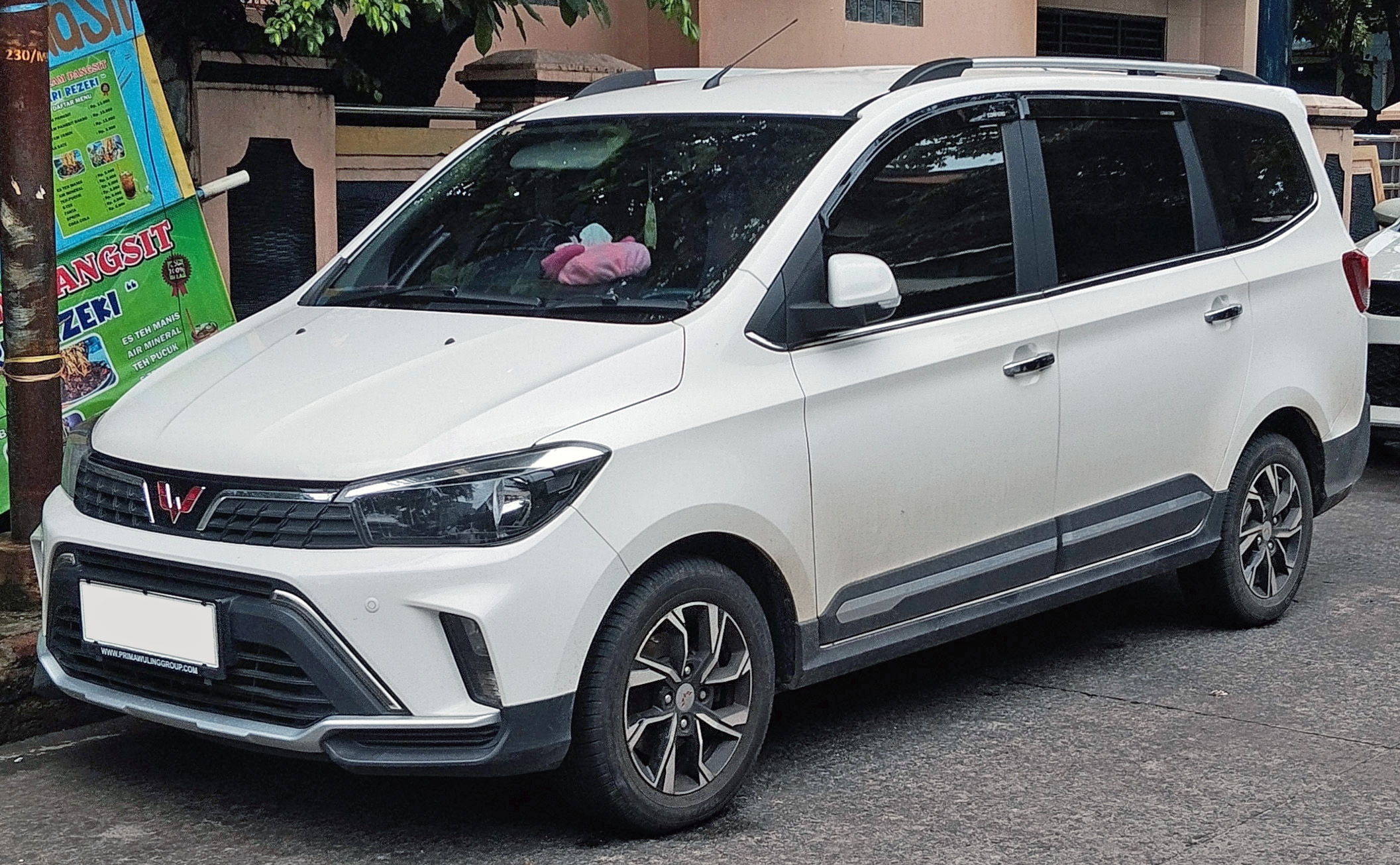
2022 Wuling Confero S L (facelift; Indonesia)

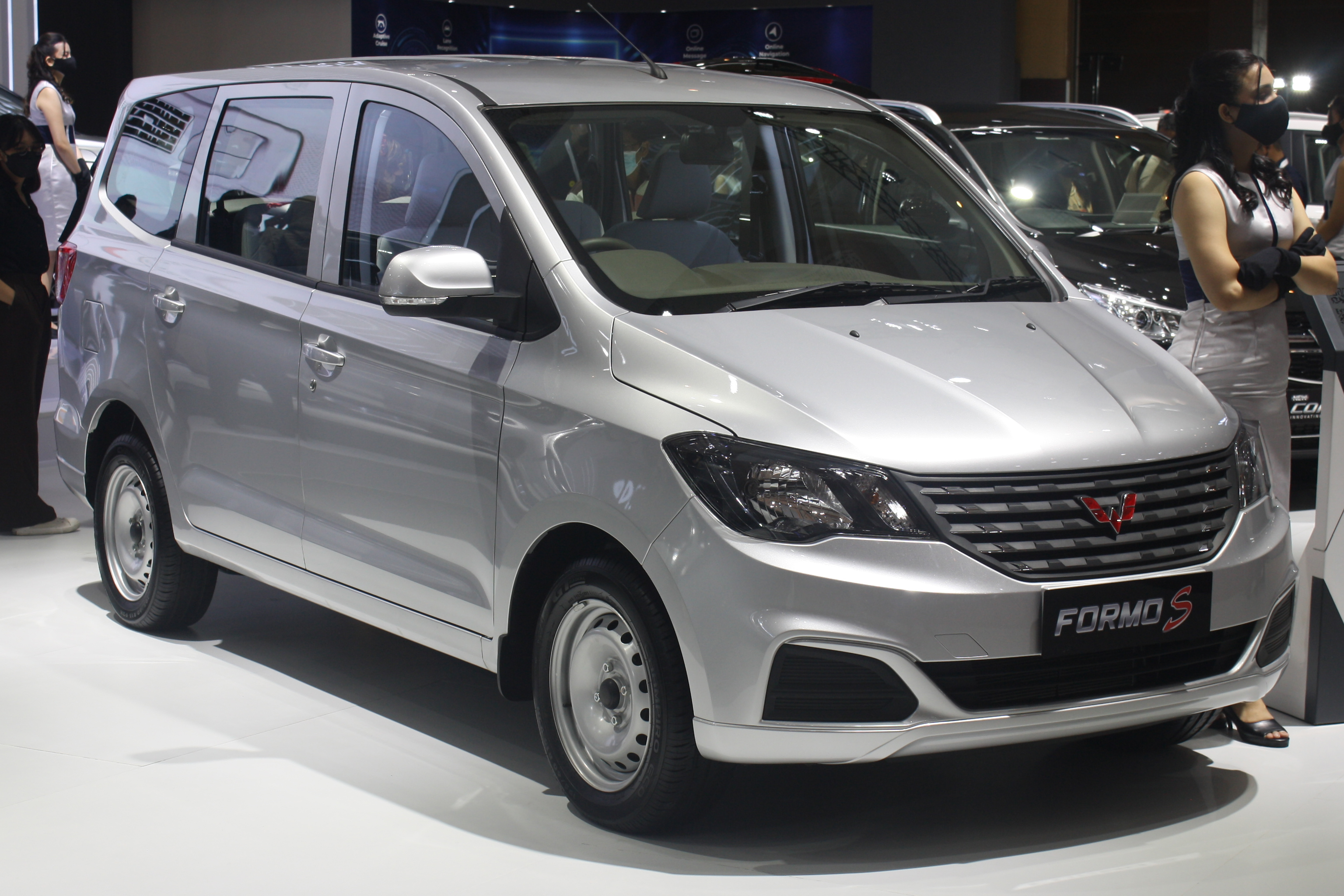
2022 Wuling Formo S (facelift, Indonesia)

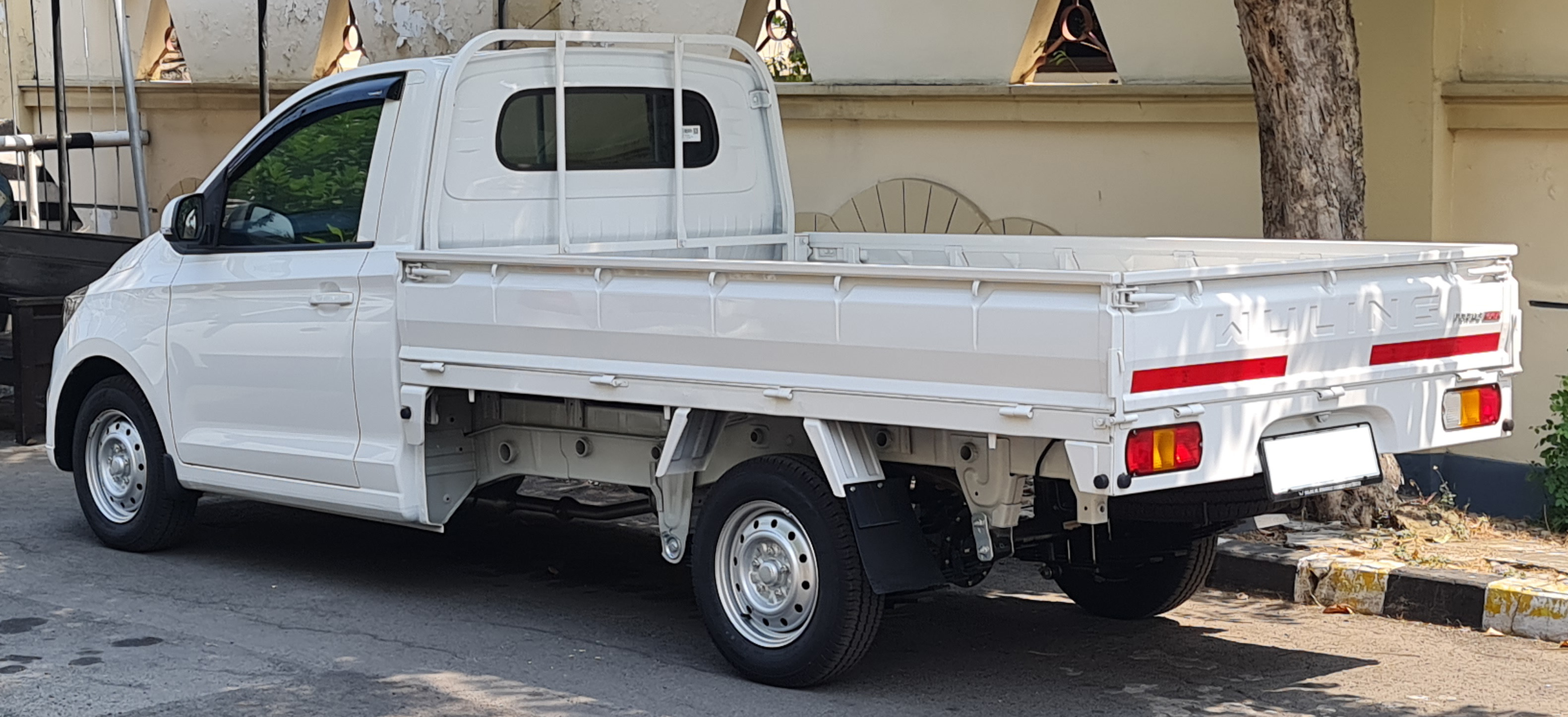
2023 Wuling Formo Max (Indonesia)

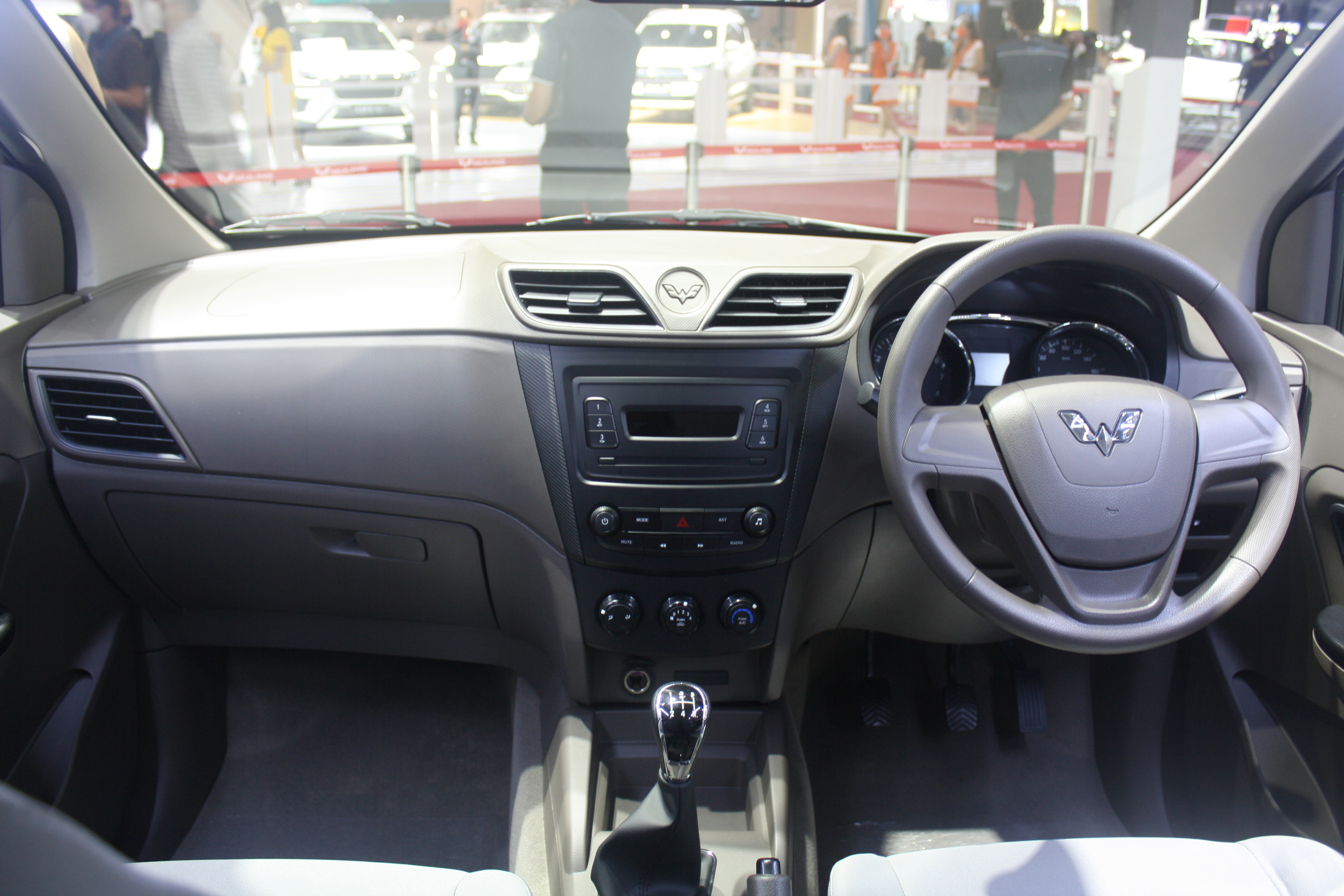
Interior (Formo)

== Safety ==
ASEAN NCAP test results Wuling Confero (2018)
Test	Points
Overall:	1 /5 stars
Adult occupant:	20.33
Child occupant:	10.05
Safety assist:	5.56

== Sales ==
Year	Indonesia		
Year	Confero	Formo	Formo Max
2017	4,958		
2018	11,062	83	
2019	9,137	301	
2020	3,060	388	
2021	10,488	999	
2022	10,844	1,285	
2023	5,887	763	1,319
2024	3,109	455	1,045
2025	2,020	202	851
