= Navlakh Umbre =

Village in Maharashtra

Navalakh Umbre Umbre Navalakh, Navlakhumbre
- Village
- Location in Maharashtra, India Navalakh Umbre (India)
- Coordinates: 18.48°N 73.41°E
- Country: India
- State: Maharashtra
- District: Pune

Government
  - Type: Panchayati raj (India)
  - Body: Gram panchayat

Area
  - Total: 1,736 ha (4,290 acres)

Population (2011)
  - Total: 3,064
  - Density: 176.5/km^{2} (457.1/sq mi)

Languages
  - Official: Marathi
- Time zone: UTC+5:30 (IST)
- PIN: 410507
- Telephone code: +912114
- Vehicle registration: MH-14
- Vidhan Sabha constituency: Maval
- Lok Sabha constituency: Maval

Navlakh Umbre is a village and gram panchayat in Mawal taluka, Pune district, Maharashtra, India. It is located about 100 km from Mumbai in the Western Ghats. The nearest railway station is Talegaon on the Pune-Mumbai route. It encompasses an area of 1,736 ha (4,290 acres).

== Administration ==
The village is administrated by a sarpanch, an elected representative who leads a gram panchayat. At the time of the 2011 Census of India, the village was the headquarters for the eponymous gram panchayat, which also governed the villages of Badhalawadi, Jadhavwadi and Mendhewadi.

== Demographics ==
At the 2011 census, the village comprised 594 households. The population of 3064 was split between 1617 males and 1447 females.

== See also ==
- Villages in Mawal taluka
