= General Motors India =

Subsidiary of General Motors

General Motors India Private Limited
- Industry: Automotive
- Founded: 1993
- Defunct: 2020; 6 years ago
- Headquarters: Halol, Gujarat (Registered Office); Gurgaon, Haryana (Marketing Office)
- Key people: Sanjiv Gupta, President and MD
- Products: A-segment cars, internal combustion engines (for export only)
- Number of employees: 4,000
- Parent: General Motors (93%); SAIC (7%)
- Subsidiaries: Opel India Private Limited; Chevrolet Sales India Private Limited

General Motors India Private Limited was a subsidiary of General Motors for its operations in India. General Motors had 93% stake in this partnership and the remaining 7% was held by SAIC. It was the 5th largest automobile manufacturing company in India after Maruti Suzuki, Hyundai, Tata Motors and Mahindra. After 21 years of operations in India, General Motors ceased selling cars in India by the end of 2017 as a part of its global restructuring actions.

General Motors India's primary focus was to manufacture and export of small cars and automotive components. Its export markets included Mexico and a few other Latin American countries until 2020. Its secondary focus was providing parts and related services for the GM vehicles that were sold in India.

== History ==
General Motors started doing business in India in 1928, assembling Chevrolet cars, trucks and buses, but ceased its assembly operations in 1952. GM continued with tie-ups with Hindustan Motors to build Bedford trucks, Vauxhall cars, Allison Transmissions and off-road equipment.

In 1994, GMIPL was formed as a joint venture, owned 50 percent by Hindustan Motors and 50 percent by General Motors, to produce and sell Opel branded vehicles. GM bought out the Hindustan Motors interest in 1999. GMIPL continued to produce Opel cars at the Halol facility until 2003, when it started production of Chevrolet vehicles at that location.

In 2000, GMIPL moved its headquarters to Gurgaon. In 2003, the company opened its technical center operations in Bangalore, which included research and development and vehicle engineering activities. The technical center operations were expanded to include purchasing and financial support services for General Motors operations located outside of India (2006), vehicle engine and transmission design and engineering (2007) and a vehicle design studio (2007).

GMIPL began construction of a second vehicle assembly plant in Talegaon in 2006, which began production of Chevrolet vehicles in September 2008.

In late 2009, General Motors announced that it would put its India operation into a 50–50 venture with Shanghai Automotive Industry Corporation of China, which is the partner of GM's main venture in China.

In October 2012, General Motors-Chevrolet announced that it has increased stake in its Indian subsidiary to 93% by buying 43% from its Chinese partner SAIC for an undisclosed sum.

In December 2017, the company stopped selling Chevrolet vehicles in the Indian market, while the Beat continued to be manufactured at the Talegaon plant for exports. The Talegaon plant was closed on 24 December 2020.

In January 2020, it was announced Chinese automobile manufacturer Great Wall Motors was set to acquire General Motors’ Talegaon manufacturing plant near Pune. The plant was expected to be sold by December 2020 but due to the 2020 China–India skirmishes, the Indian government has not yet approved the sale of the plant. This was the last GM plant in India after the sale of the Halol, Gujarat plant to SAIC. The deal collapsed in June 2022. But instead, Hyundai Motor Company acquired Talegaon plant in 2023.

== Manufacturing facilities ==
GMIPL operated vehicle manufacturing plants in Halol, Gujarat and Talegaon Dabhade, Maharashtra. It maintained headquarters in Halol and Gurgaon and a large technical center in Bangalore. Its Halol and Talegaon Dabhade manufacturing plants had a combined production capacity of 225,000 vehicles annually. Between 2018 and 2020, this plant only produced the left-hand drive Beat hatchback and notchback for export markets, while the Halol plant was taken over by JSW MG Motor India.

== Sales, service and marketing business ==
Like most other automotive companies in India, GMIPL appoints independently owned dealers to sell, service and market vehicles that it produces. As of August 2008, managed the Chevrolet dealership network (including export dealers located in Nepal, Bangladesh, Sri Lanka and Bhutan) from its headquarters in Gurgaon, and regional zone offices in Mumbai, Kolkata and Chennai.

GMIPL also sells parts and services to independent vehicle maintenance providers under the AC Delco brand. GM India's sales declined to 6,079 units in May 2012, while the figure last year same month was 8,329 units.

== Emission regulation controversy ==
In July 2013, GM India announced a recall of 114,000 units of the Tavera. After the recall, an internal probe revealed that GM India were violating Indian testing norms. According to the internal probe, some GM India employees were putting tuned higher emission engines which had already failed tests. 25 employees were fired following the incident and GM India would also have to pay a ₹23 million ($358,000) fine.

== Models ==
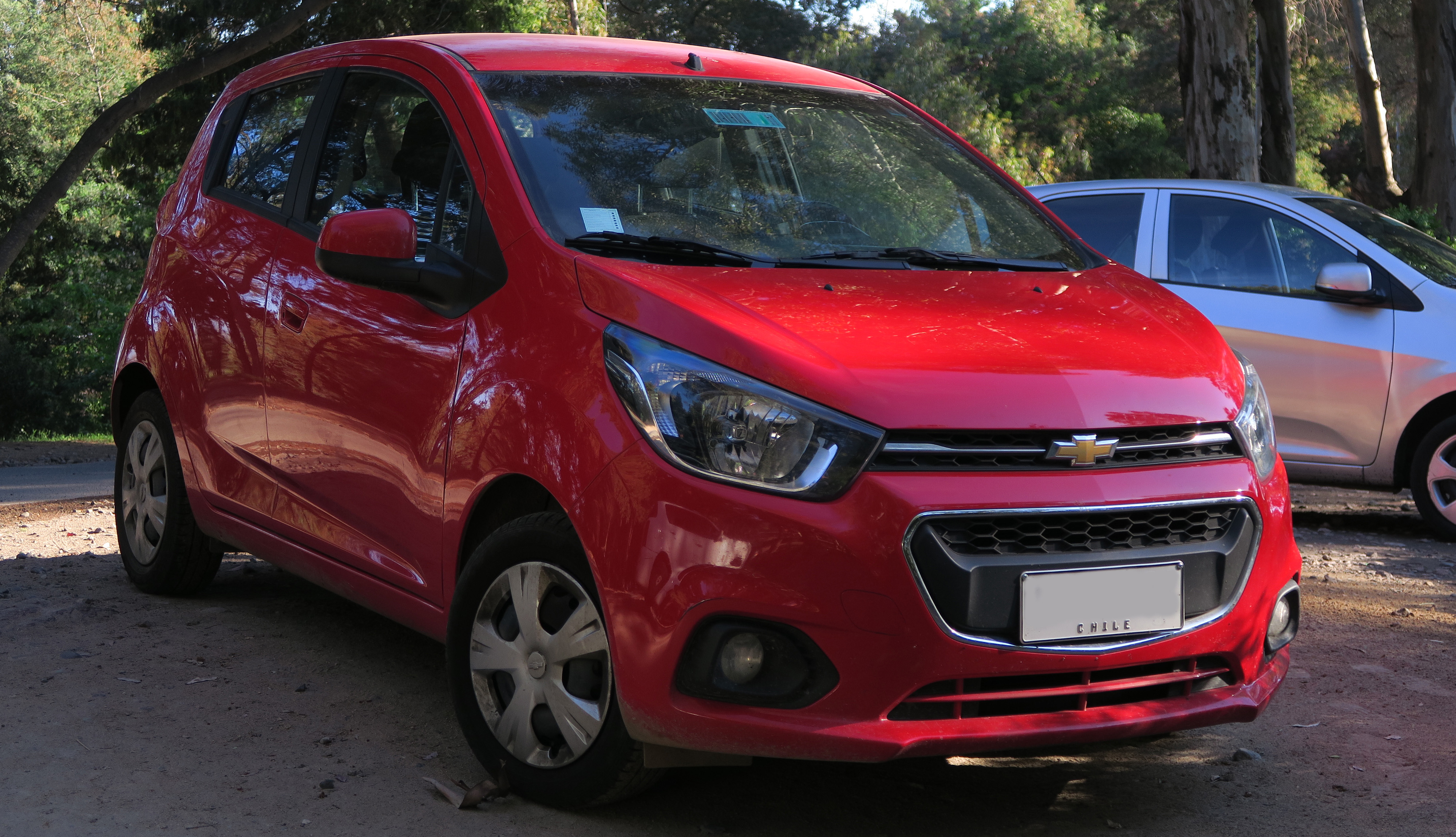
2020 Chevrolet Beat Facelift (Built but not sold in India)

=== Chevrolet ===
==== Discontinued ====
Model	Released	Discontinued	Image	Notes
Optra	2003	2012		
Forester	2003	2007	(Subaru Forester pictured)	Imported
Tavera	2004	2017		
Aveo	2006	2012		
Optra SRV	2006	2010		
Aveo U-VA	2006	2012		
Spark	2007	2017		
Captiva	2008	2016		
Cruze	2009	2017		
Beat	2010	2017		
Sail U-VA	2012	2017		
Sail	2013	2017		
Enjoy	2013	2017	(Wuling Hongguang pictured)	
Trailblazer	2015	2017		

=== Opel ===
==== Discontinued ====
Model	Released	Discontinued	Image	Notes
Astra	1996	2003		
Corsa	2000	2006		
Corsa Swing	2001	2006		
Vectra	2003	2006		Imported
Corsa Sail	2003	2006		
