= Daewoo S-TEC engine =

Overview
- Manufacturer: Daewoo Motors (1991-2002); General Motors (2002-present)
- Also called: M-TEC; P-TEC; SMARTECH II
- Production: 1991-present

Layout
- Configuration: Inline-3, Inline-4
- Displacement: 0.8 L (796 cc); 1.0 L (995 cc); 1.2 L (1,150 cc); 1.2 L (1,199 cc); 1.2 L (1,206 cc); 1.2 L (1,249 cc); 1.4 L (1,399 cc); 1.5 L (1,451 cc); 1.5 L (1,485 cc)
- Cylinder bore: 68.5 mm (2.70 in); 69.7 mm (2.74 in); 70.5 mm (2.78 in); 74.71 mm (2.94 in)
- Piston stroke: 67.5 mm (2.66 in); 72 mm (2.83 in); 78 mm (3.07 in); 79 mm (3.11 in); 80 mm (3.15 in); 84.7 mm (3.33 in)
- Cylinder block material: Cast iron
- Cylinder head material: Aluminum
- Valvetrain: DOHC 4 valves x cyl.; SOHC 2 valves x cyl.
- Compression ratio: 9.3:1, 9.5:1, 9.8:1, 10.2:1, 10.5:1

Combustion
- Turbocharger: Mitsubishi Heavy Industries one-stage single-scroll (Daewoo S-TEC III LL5 versions)
- Fuel system: Fuel injection
- Fuel type: Gasoline; LPG
- Oil system: Wet sump
- Cooling system: Water-cooled

Output
- Power output: 36–110 kW (49–150 PS; 48–148 hp)
- Torque output: 71.5–230 N⋅m (52.7–169.6 lb⋅ft)

Emissions
- Emissions control systems: EGR

Chronology
- Successor: Small Gasoline Engine

S-TEC or M-TEC is a low-displacement engine range co-developed by Suzuki and Daewoo Motors for use in micro and subcompact cars. The original version was a license-built version of the Suzuki F8B engine; later generations were derived from the original design in South Korea.

== S-TEC ==
The first model was 0.8 L (796 cc) SOHC straight-three engine based on the powertrain of the Suzuki Alto.

In 2002, the range was extended to 1.0 L (995 cc) and 1.2 L (1,150 cc) inline-four engines and updated with EGR valve to reduce emission. A new engine plant for the updated model T4 was built. The 1.0 version is used in Chevrolet Matiz and the 1.2 in the European Chevrolet Kalos.

In 2004 the 0.8 and 1.0 engines were updated again. New intake and exhaust systems, along with low-friction aluminum cam followers with rollers were added, resulting in better economy.

Cylinders	Displacement	Bore	Stroke	Compression Ratio	Power	Torque
I3	0.8 L (796 cc)	68.5 mm (2.70 in)	72 mm (2.83 in)		36 kW (49 PS; 48 hp) at 6000 rpm	71.5 N⋅m (52.7 lb⋅ft) at 4000 rpm
I4	1.0 L (995 cc)	68.5 mm (2.70 in)	67.5 mm (2.66 in)	9.3:1	48.5 kW (66 PS; 65 hp) at 5400 rpm	91 N⋅m (67 lb⋅ft) at 4200 rpm
I4	1.2 L (1,150 cc)	68.5 mm (2.70 in)	78 mm (3.07 in)	9.3:1	53 kW (72 PS; 71 hp) at 5400 rpm	104 N⋅m (77 lb⋅ft) at 4400 rpm

Applications:

- 1991-2001 Daewoo Tico/Fino
- 1998–present Chevrolet/Daewoo Matiz
- Chevrolet/Daewoo Kalos

== S-TEC II ==
For 2008, a new 1.2 L (1,206 cc) version dubbed S-TEC II is introduced with the new Chevrolet Aveo hatchback; new features include chain-driven 16-valve DOHC valvetrain and variable intake geometry. The 1.0 L version has been introduced with the 2010 Chevrolet Spark. A 1.2 L LPG/gasoline version was developed exclusively for the India market; called SMARTECH II and used in the 2010 Chevrolet Beat. Introduced in 2013, the 1.2 L version is available in the United States version of the Chevrolet Spark.

Name	Displacement	Bore	Stroke	Compression Ratio	Power	Torque
	1.0 L (995 cc)	68.5 mm (2.70 in)	67.5 mm (2.66 in)	9.8:1	50 kW (68 PS; 67 hp) at 6400 rpm	93 N⋅m (69 lb⋅ft) at 4800 rpm
LMU	1.2 L (1,206 cc)	69.7 mm (2.74 in)	79 mm (3.11 in)	10.5:1	62 kW (84 PS; 83 hp) at 6000 rpm	114 N⋅m (84 lb⋅ft) at 3800-4400 rpm
LKY	1.2 L			9.8:1	60 kW (82 PS; 80 hp) at 6400 rpm	111 N⋅m (82 lb⋅ft) at 4800 rpm
	1.2 L (1,199 cc)				80.5 PS (59.2 kW; 79.4 hp) at 6200 rpm (Gasoline); 80.04 PS (58.87 kW; 78.95 hp) at 6400 rpm (LPG)	108 N⋅m (80 lb⋅ft) at 4400 rpm (Gasoline); 104 N⋅m (77 lb⋅ft) at 4400 rpm (LPG)
LL0	1.2 L (1,249 cc)	70.5 mm (2.78 in)	80 mm (3.15 in)	10.5:1	62.66 kW (85 PS; 84 hp) at 6400 rpm	112.05 N⋅m (82.64 lb⋅ft) at 6400 rpm

Applications:

- 2008-2011 Chevrolet Aveo
- 2010–present Chevrolet Sail
- 2010–2022 Chevrolet Beat/Spark
- 2018–present Wuling Formo
- 2002-2012 Micro Privliege

== S-TEC III ==
Name	Displacement	Bore	Stroke	Compression Ratio	Power	Torque
LCU	1.4 L (1,399 cc)			10.2:1	76 kW (103 PS; 102 hp) at 6000 rpm	131 N⋅m (97 lb⋅ft) at 4200 rpm
L2B	1.5 L (1,485 cc)	74.7 mm (2.94 in)	84.7 mm (3.33 in)	10.2:1	85 kW (116 PS; 114 hp) at 6000 rpm	144 N⋅m (106 lb⋅ft) at 3800 rpm
LJO	1.5 L (1,451 cc) T	73.8 mm (2.91 in)	84.7 mm (3.33 in)	9.8:1	108 kW (147 PS; 145 hp) at 5500 rpm	250 N⋅m (184 lb⋅ft) at 2000-3800 rpm

1.4 L applications:

- Chevrolet Sail (second generation)
1.5 L applications:
- Chevrolet Sail (third generation)
- 2013-2015 Chevrolet Spin
- Baojun 630
- 2013–2016 Chevrolet Lacetti/Buick Excelle (first generation)
- 2016–present Buick Excelle (second generation)
- Wuling Rongguang
- Wuling Hongguang V (later Rongguang V)
- Wuling Hongguang
- Wuling Hongguang S
- Wuling Hongguang S1/Confero S/Formo
- Wuling Zhengcheng
- Wuling Victory
- Buick Verano (second generation, China)
- Baojun 310/310W
- Baojun 330
- Baojun 610/630
- Baojun 730/Wuling Cortez CT
- Baojun 510
- Baojun 530/Wuling Almaz/Chevrolet Captiva/MG Hector
- Chevrolet Lova RV
- 2017–present Chevrolet Cavalier
- 2014–2020 Chevrolet Cruze Classic (China)
- 2014–2020 Chevrolet Cruze (China)
- 2021–present Buick Velite 6 PHEV
- 2012-present Chevrolet Cobalt (Uzbekistan)

NOTE: Some horsepower and torque number have small differences on different models.

== See also ==
- GM Family 1 engine (called E-TEC by Daewoo)
- GM Small Gasoline Engine
- GM Family 0 engine
