= 360 =

360 may refer to:

- 360 (number)
- 360 AD, a year
- 360 BC, a year
- 360 degrees, a turn

== Businesses and organizations ==
- 360 Architecture, an American architectural design firm
- Ngong Ping 360, a tourism project in Lantau Island, Hong Kong
- Qihoo 360, a Chinese software company
- ThreeSixty, a Hong Kong supermarket

== Electronics and software ==
=== Computing ===
- System/360, a computing product line by IBM
- System/360 architecture, a computing architecture by IBM

=== Electronics ===
- Moto 360, a smartwatch by Motorola
- Rickenbacker 360, an electric, semi-acoustic guitar by string instrument manufacturer Rickenbacker
- Xbox 360, a video game console by Microsoft

=== Software ===
- 360are, a virtual tour platform
- Qihoo 360, a Chinese software company
  - 360 Safeguard, a brand of security software developed by Qihoo 360
  - 360 Secure Browser, a web browser developed by Qihoo 360
- Norton 360, a computer security suite by Symantec

== Media ==
=== Music ===
- 360 (rapper), an Australian hip hop artist
- 360° (Chelo album), 2006
- 360° (Dreadzone album), also known as Dreadzone... ...360°, 1993
- 360° (Tinchy Stryder album), 2014
- 360, an album by The Supernaturals, 2015
- 360 (song), a song by Charli XCX from Brat, 2024
- U2 360° Tour, a music performance tour by the band U2, 2009-2011

=== Television ===
- Anderson Cooper 360°, a CNN television news program
- Battle 360°, a 2008 American documentary television series
- 360 (Turkey), a Turkish TV channel

=== Other media ===
- 360 (film), a 2011 film
- 360 (magazine), a magazine by Imagine Publishing covering the Xbox 360
- 360: Three Sixty, a racing video game released on Sony's PlayStation
- News360, a news aggregator app
- Yahoo! 360°, Yahoo's blogging platform

== Vehicles ==
=== Aircraft ===
- Short 360, a British commuter aircraft

=== Automobiles ===
- Baojun 360, a Chinese compact MPV
- Ferrari 360, an Italian sports car
- Mitsubishi 360, a Japanese light commercial vehicle series
- Roewe 360, a Chinese compact sedan
- Subaru 360, a Japanese kei car
- Volvo 360, a Swedish compact car
- Cony 360, a Japanese kei car

== Other uses ==
- .360 Buckhammer, a centerfire rifle cartridge
- 360 deal or 360° deal, a business relationship between artist and company
- 360-degree feedback, a process in company performance reviews of soliciting opinions from a wider range of sources
- Area code 360, the telephone area code for western Washington state, United States
- Circle-Vision 360°, multi-camera filmmaking technology from Walt Disney Imagineering
- Rubik's 360, a three-dimensional mechanical puzzle
- Three60, Manchester, a residential skyscraper under construction in Manchester, England
- Nai Wai stop, station code
- Panoramic photography, or 360° photography.

== See also ==
- 360th (disambiguation)
- 360 degrees (disambiguation)
