= 360 degrees (disambiguation) =

360 degrees is a turn.

360 degrees or 360° may also refer to:

- 360° (EP), an EP by Infinite
- 360 Degrees (album), an LPG album
- 360° (Chelo album), 2006
- 360° (Dreadzone album), 1993
- 360° (Too Phat album), 2003
- 360°, an album by Tinchy Stryder, 2014
- "360 Degrees (What Goes Around)", a song on Reel to Reel by Grand Puba
- Anderson Cooper 360°, a television news show

== See also ==
- 360 (disambiguation)
- Circle
- 360 degree camera
- 360-degree feedback
- 360 degree view
