= Baojun RM-5 =

Chinese SUV

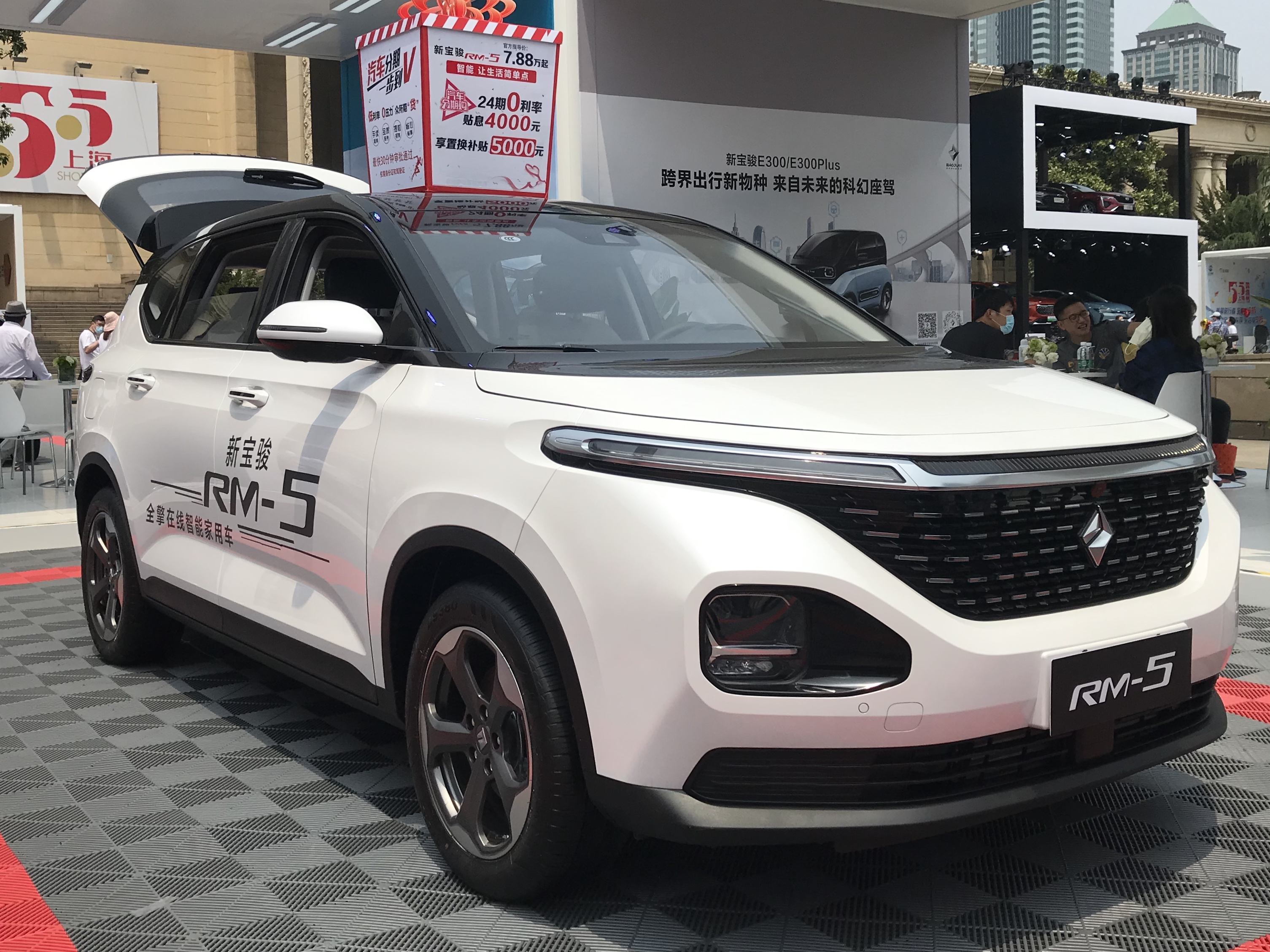

Overview
- Manufacturer: SAIC-GM-Wuling
- Production: 2019–2021
- Assembly: China: Liuzhou, Guangxi
- Designer: Junkai Yang (concept version)

Body and chassis
- Class: Mid-size crossover SUV
- Body style: 5-door SUV
- Layout: Front-engine, front-wheel-drive
- Related: Baojun 530; Baojun 730; Baojun RC-6

Powertrain
- Engine: 1.5 L LJO I4-T (petrol)
- Power output: 108 kW (145 hp; 147 PS)
- Transmission: 6-speed manual; CVT

Dimensions
- Wheelbase: 2,750 mm (108.3 in)
- Length: 4,705 mm (185.2 in)
- Width: 1,806 mm (71.1 in)
- Height: 1,625 mm (64.0 in)
- Curb weight: 1,470–1,541 kg (3,240.8–3,397.3 lb)

Chronology
- Successor: Wuling Nebula

The Baojun RM-5 is a mid-size crossover SUV produced by SAIC-GM-Wuling through the Baojun brand. It was introduced in September 2019.

== Overview ==
The RM-5 debuted as a concept car named RM-C during the 2019 Shanghai Auto Show at the Shanghai International Fashion Center in April 2019.

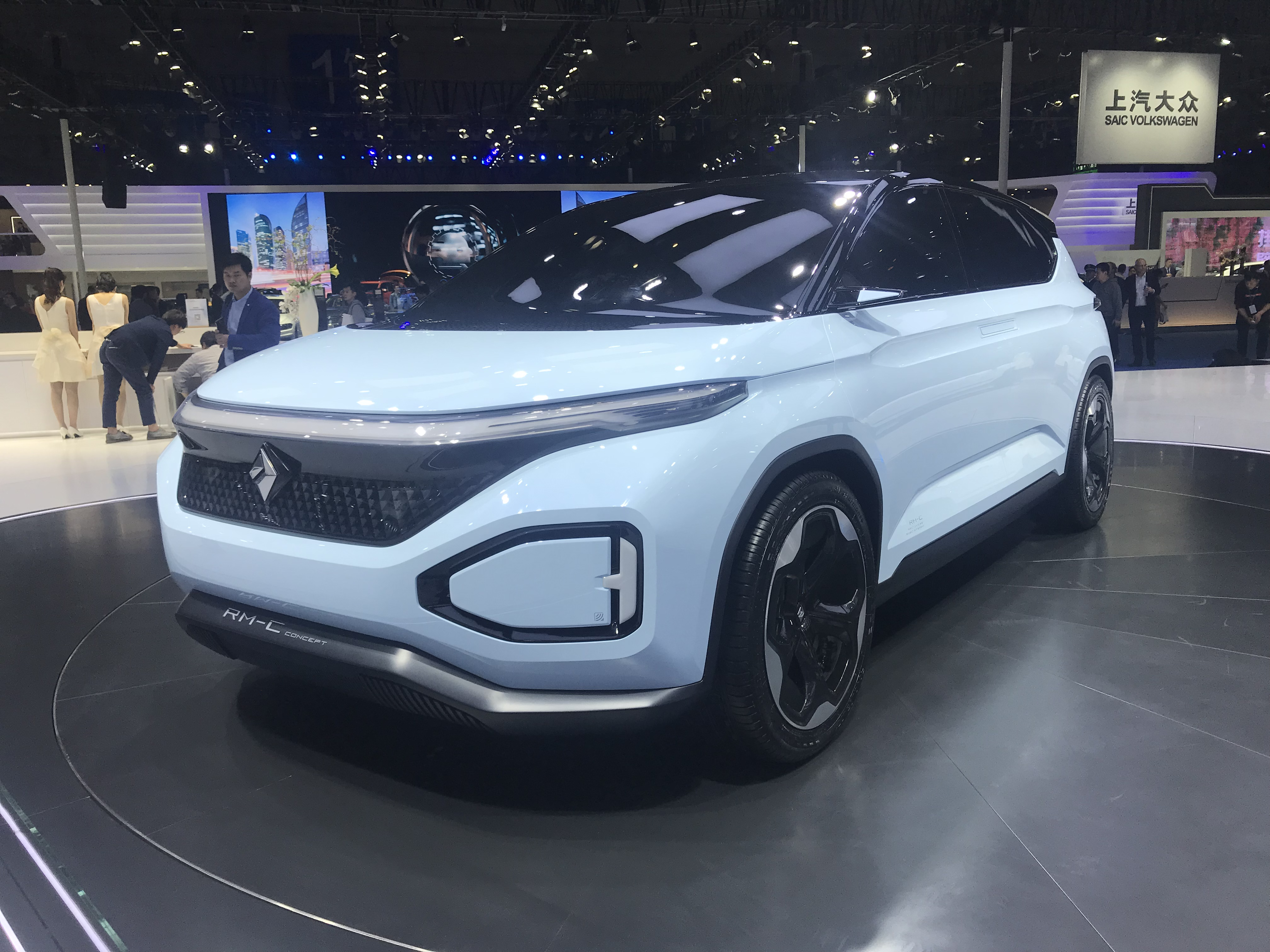
Baojun RM-C Concept

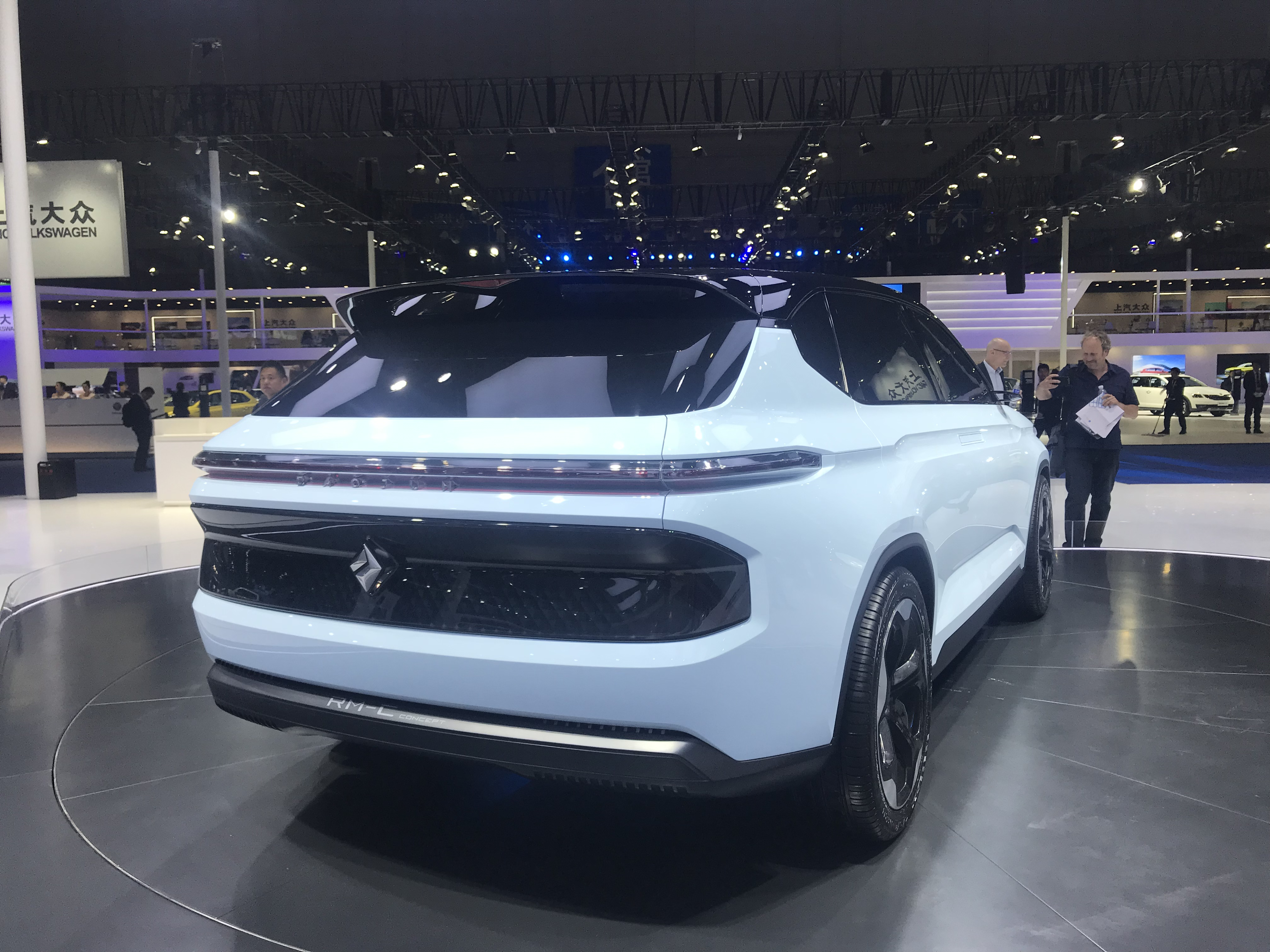
Rear view

The mass production version was announced three months later. The RM-5 is positioned under the 'New Baojun' sub-category together with the RS-5 and RC-6, and as the upmarket alternative to the Baojun 730. Initial prices started from 86,800 yuan to 118,800 yuan. The RM-5 is powered by a 1.5-liter turbocharged four-cylinder engine rated at 145 hp (108 kW; 147 PS) and 245 N⋅m (181 lb⋅ft; 25 kg⋅m) of torque. Transmission options include a standard six-speed manual transmission and an optional CVT that can simulate eight speeds.

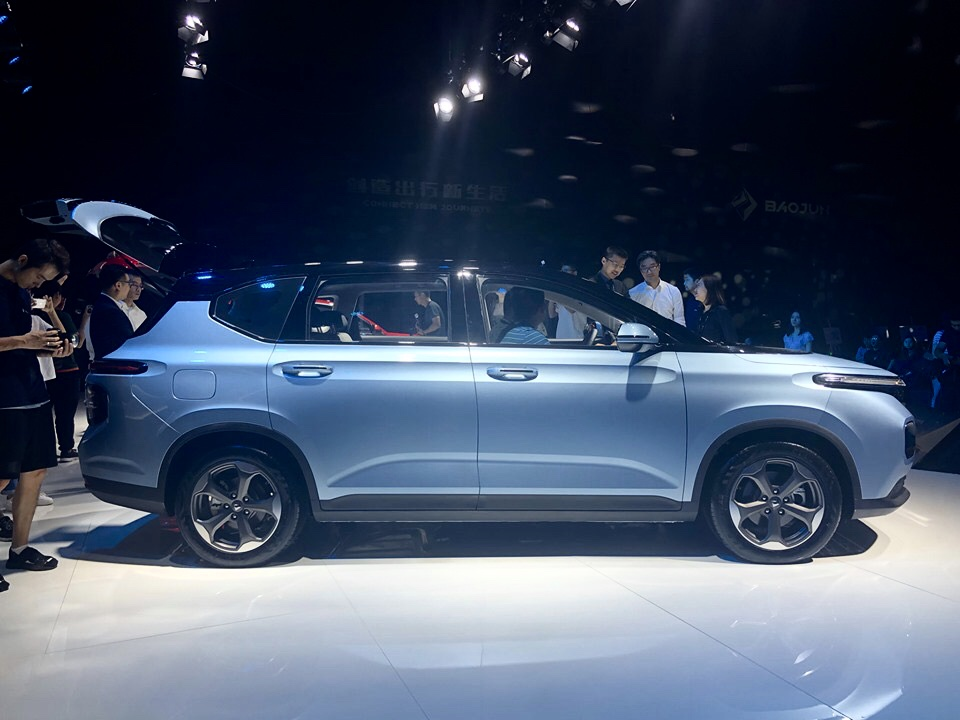
Side profile, production version

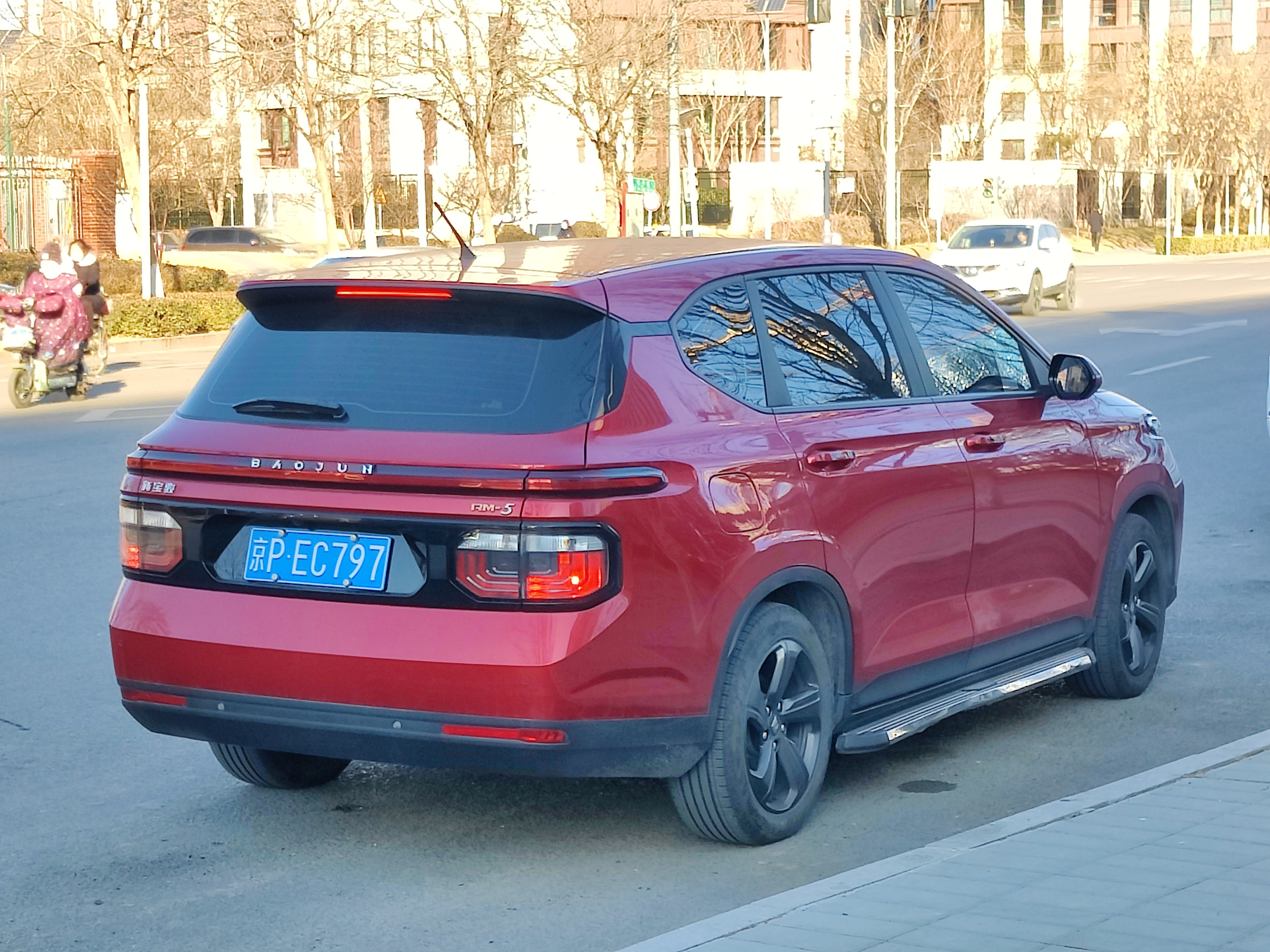
Rear view

== Sales ==
Year	China
2019	30,562
2020	29,191
2021	2,087
2022	99
2023	104
2024	1
