= Wuling Nebula =

Compact crossover SUV

Overview
- Manufacturer: SAIC-GM-Wuling
- Model code: CN202K
- Also called: Wuling Xingyun
- Production: 2023–present
- Assembly: China: Liuzhou, Guangxi

Body and chassis
- Class: Compact crossover SUV
- Body style: 5-door SUV
- Layout: Front-engine, front-wheel-drive
- Related: Baojun RM-5

Powertrain
- Engine: Petrol: 2.0 L LJM20A I4
- Electric motor: 100 kW permanent magnet synchronous
- Power output: 174 hp (176 PS; 130 kW)

Dimensions
- Wheelbase: 2,700 mm (106.3 in)
- Length: 4,610 mm (181.5 in)
- Width: 1,810 mm (71.3 in)
- Height: 1,670 mm (65.7 in)
- Curb weight: 1,600 kg (3,527 lb)

Chronology
- Predecessor: Baojun RM-5

The Wuling Nebula (Chinese: 五菱星云; pinyin: Wǔlíng Xingyun) is a compact crossover SUV manufactured by SAIC-GM-Wuling (SGMW) since 2023 under the Wuling brand.

== Overview ==
Rear view

In August 2023, the Wuling was presented the third SUV from its new line of elevated models, this time in the form of the largest of them, entitled the Nebula, sharing components with the related Baojun RM-5. The car has an aesthetic rich in rounded shapes, with large, elaborate double-row headlights. The upper one gained an elongated shape, and between them there was a large air intake decorated with imitation chrome. The rear part of the body is topped with a narrow light strip.

The passenger cabin has a strict, simple aesthetic, focusing on a massive, vertically cut dashboard with high and vertically located air vents. Between them there is a 10.25-inch touch display. The multimedia system is based on the proprietary Ling OS operating system.

Market debut took place at the end of September 2023. The car went on sale in two variants of equipment.

== Specifications ==
The Nebula is a car with a classic HEV hybrid drive, which combines a 2.0-liter naturally aspirated combustion engine with an electric engine to develop 174 hp (176 PS; 130 kW) and 320 Nm of maximum torque. The maximum speed of the system is 135 km/h (84 mph), which is relatively low for modern passenger cars.

== Sales ==
Year	China
2023	2,990
2024	2,833
2025	4
