= Cha Cha (song) =

2006 single by Chelo

- Cha Cha cover

Single by Chelo

from the album 360°
- Released: January 31, 2006
- Genre: Go-go
- Length: 3:14 (English version); 3:15 (Spanglish version)
- Label: Norte; Sony BMG Latin
- Songwriters: Chelo; Jeeve; Nir Seroussi
- Producer: Jeeve

Chelo singles chronology
"Cha Cha" (2006)	"Yummy" (2006)

"Cha Cha" is the debut single from Puerto Rican reggaeton singer Chelo from his album 360°. It peaked at No. 16 on the Billboard Hot Latin Tracks chart. Chelo performed the song at Miss Universe 2006 during the swimsuit competition. It's a playable track on the 1994 Wii version of the rhythm game Samba de Amigo.

== Music video ==
The video takes place in an underground club set in the 1920s with Chelo coming onstage in 1920s style clothing with two female dancers before changing into more modern clothing along with club. The two styles eventually converge on each other and they all perform together by the end of the song. The video features the song "Yummy" at the end.

== Promo single – track list ==
Two remixes were commissioned for this song, which have gained some club attention for this song.

1. English version – 3:14
2. Spanglish version – 3:15
3. Dave Aude cha club – 8:09
4. Dave Aude cha edit – 3:38
5. Dave Aude cha mixshow – 6:06
6. Dave's All Nite dub – 7:51
7. L.E.X. Percussiva Vox Da club mix – 7:29
8. L.E.X. Percussiva Dub Da club mix – 6:19
9. L.E.X. Percussiva Mixshow – 5:26
10. L.E.X. Percussiva radio edit – 3:51
11. Acapella English – 3:12
12. Acapella Spanglish – 2:50

== Charts ==
Chart	Peak position
Finland Singles Top 20	13
Hungary (Dance Top 40)	2
Hungary (Rádiós Top 40)	2
Hungary (Single Top 40)	6
US Billboard Hot Latin Tracks	16
