= Jyve V =

Puerto Rican Latin pop band

- Origin: Puerto Rico
- Genres: Latin pop
- Years active: 1997–present
- Members: Jasond Calderón; Samuel Padua; Rafael Calderón; Álex Martínez; Chelo Mejías

Jyve V is a Puerto Rican Latin pop band which got its first public exposure when they won dance contest "La Batalla de los Sexos" (Battle of the Sexes) in 1997. Next year they won another dance contest held in Miami Beach, Florida. Jyve V did originally start as three member group consisting of Alex and brothers Jason and Rafael. Chelo joined Jyve V in 1999. The band name comes from dance style jive, and number of group members. Chelo's solo album 360 ° was released in June 2006.

== Discography ==
=== Albums ===
- Jyve V, March 14, 2000
- Solar, November 20, 2001

=== Compilations ===
- 15 de Colección, September 21, 2004

Song "Magic of the Night" is theme for Destination Stardom television show on Pax TV network.

Song "Sólo a Tu Lado Quiero Vivir" (I only want to live by your side) is theme for Venezuelan telenovela Juana la virgen (Juana the virgin).
