= 360th =

360th may refer to:

- 360th Bombardment Squadron, an inactive United States Air Force unit
- 360th Civil Affairs Brigade (United States)
- 360th Fighter Squadron, a unit of the North Carolina Air National Guard
- 360th Reconnaissance Squadron, later 360th Tactical Electronic Warfare Squadron
- 360th Rifle Division, a unit of the Soviet Ground Forces

== See also ==
- 360 (number)
- 360 (disambiguation)
- AD 360, the year 360 (CCCLX) of the Julian calendar
- 360 BC
