= Chelo (American singer) =

American singer, rapper, and choreographer

Jose Mejias, better known as Chelo, is an American singer, rapper and choreographer based in Miami Beach, Florida, signed with Sony BMG as a solo artist. His debut album is 360°, and fuses hip hop, go-go and Latin music. The album is recorded in both English and Spanish. He is of Puerto Rican descent. His single "Cha Cha" was nominated for two Billboard Latin Music Awards.

Chelo grew up in San Juan, Puerto Rico, the only child of an accountant and a secretary. His father put him in as a guest conga player in his salsa band, and young Chelo also would sing at family events. Chelo was asked by reggaeton star Daddy Yankee to assist him as a choreographer while still in high school, which led to his joining the groups Jyve V and Mexican ATM, which both had songs in the Billboard Latin Top 40.

- Cha Cha (2006)
- Yummy (2006)
- Un Corazón (2007)

"Yummy" was the second single released, which can be found on his debut album, 360°. The song was featured at the end of the video for "Cha Cha." In the full version of the video, Miss Universe 2006 winner Zuleyka Rivera was featured in a cameo. In the remix version it features American rapper Too Short. The song was not as successful as his first single, peaking at #48 on the Billboard Hot Latin Tracks chart."Un Corazón" (translated as One Heart) the third single released, from his debut album 360°. The song samples "La Murga" by Héctor Lavoe. It was a moderate success in Europe, however not in the US, where his previous single, "Yummy" performed better.

== Discography ==
Album information
360°
- Release: June 27, 2006
- Label: Sony BMG Latin
- Singles: "Cha Cha", "Yummy", "Un Corazón"

== Other ==
Chelo sang at Miss Universe 2006, Zuleyka Rivera's homecoming in Puerto Rico. The song "Cha Cha" is a playable track in the rhythm game Samba De Amigo.
