= Baojun 360 =

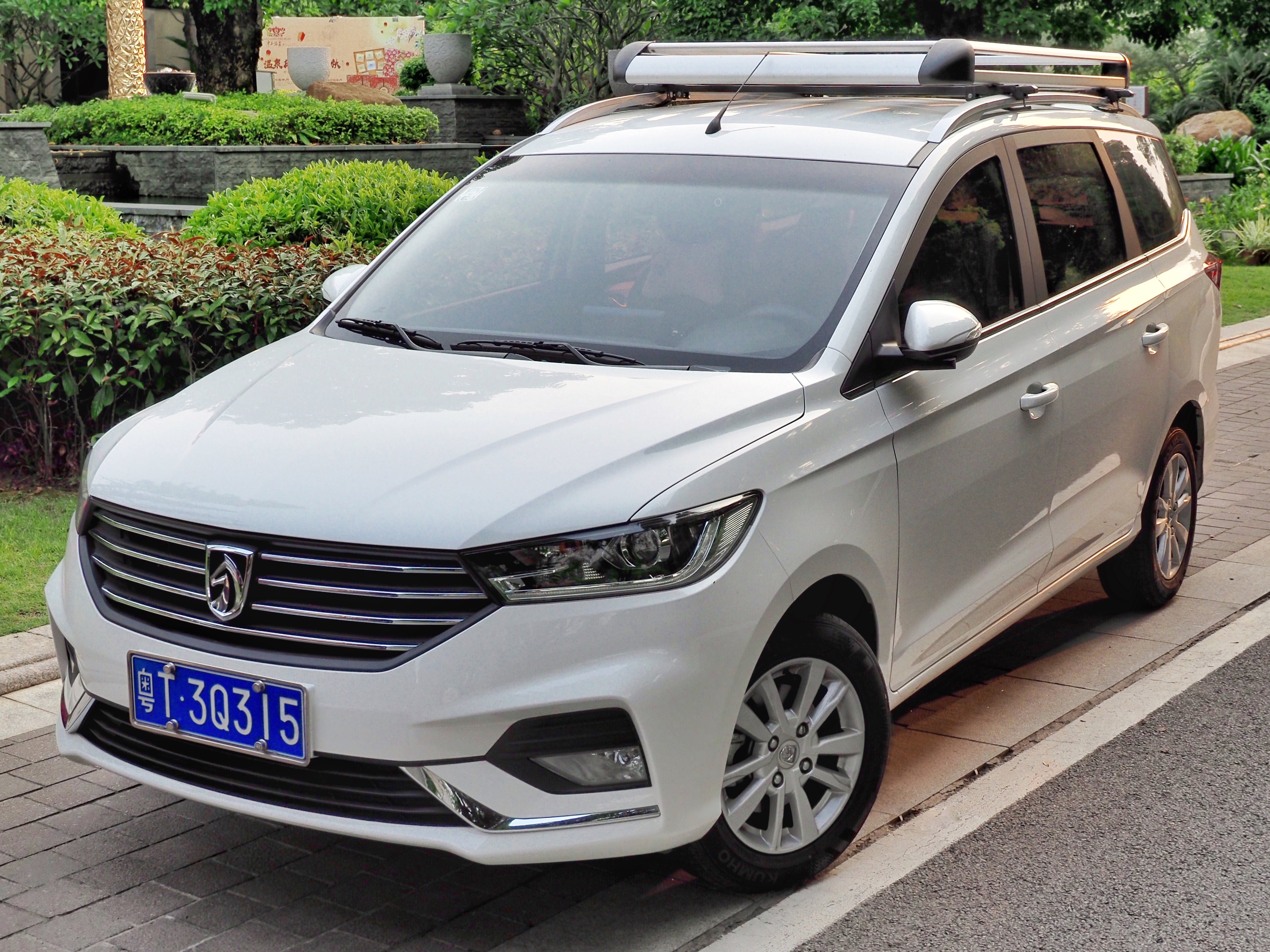

Overview
- Manufacturer: SAIC-GM-Wuling
- Production: 2018–2021
- Assembly: China: Chongqing

Body and chassis
- Class: Compact MPV
- Body style: 5-door wagon
- Layout: Front-engine, front-wheel-drive

Powertrain
- Engine: 1.5 L L2B I4 (petrol)
- Power output: 82 kW (110 hp; 111 PS)
- Transmission: 6-speed manual; Automated manual

Dimensions
- Wheelbase: 2,750 mm (108.3 in)
- Length: 4,615 mm (181.7 in)
- Width: 1,735 mm (68.3 in)

The Baojun 360 is a 6-seater compact MPV produced by SAIC-GM-Wuling through the Baojun brand. It is positioned below the 730 within Baojun's lineup.

== Engines ==
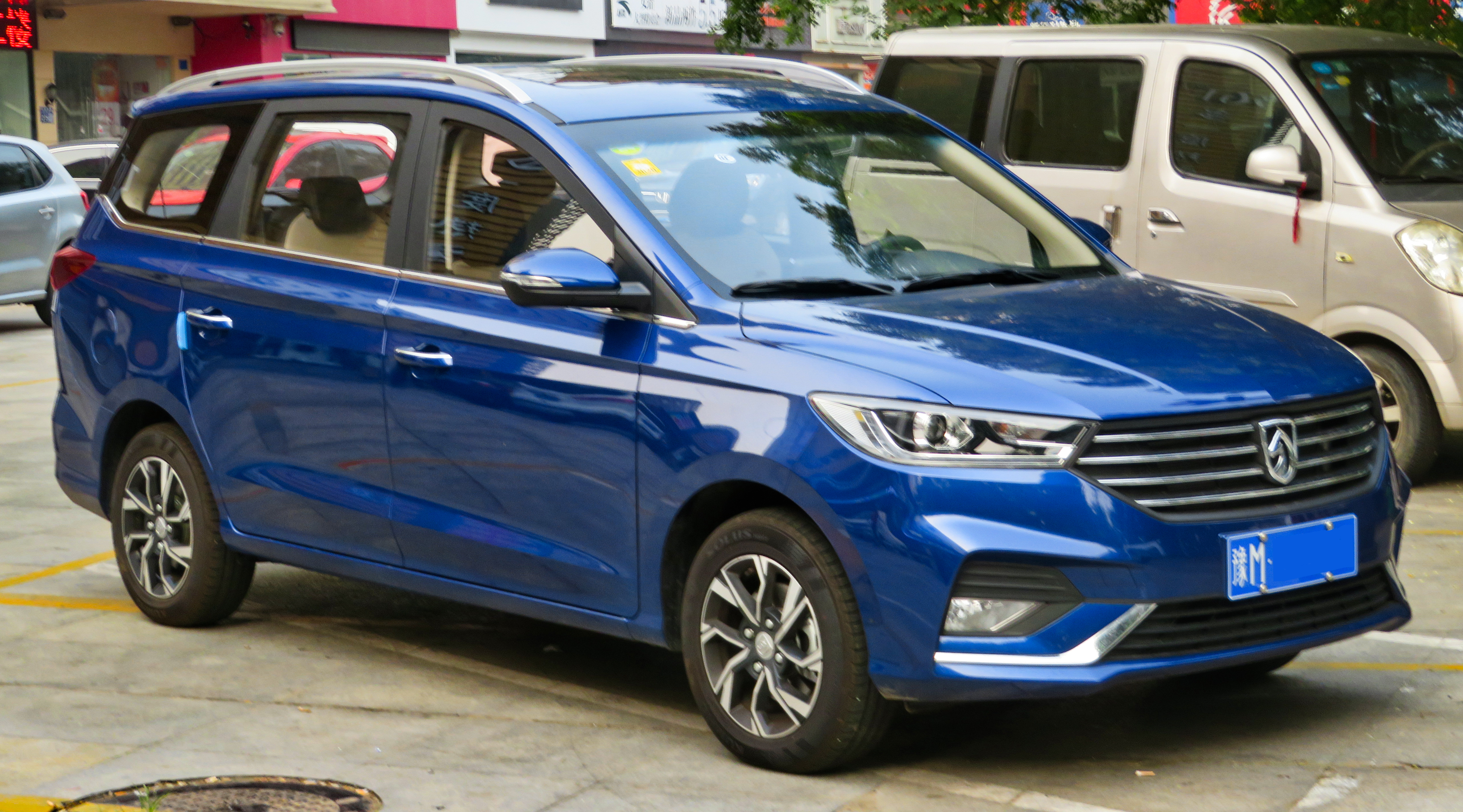

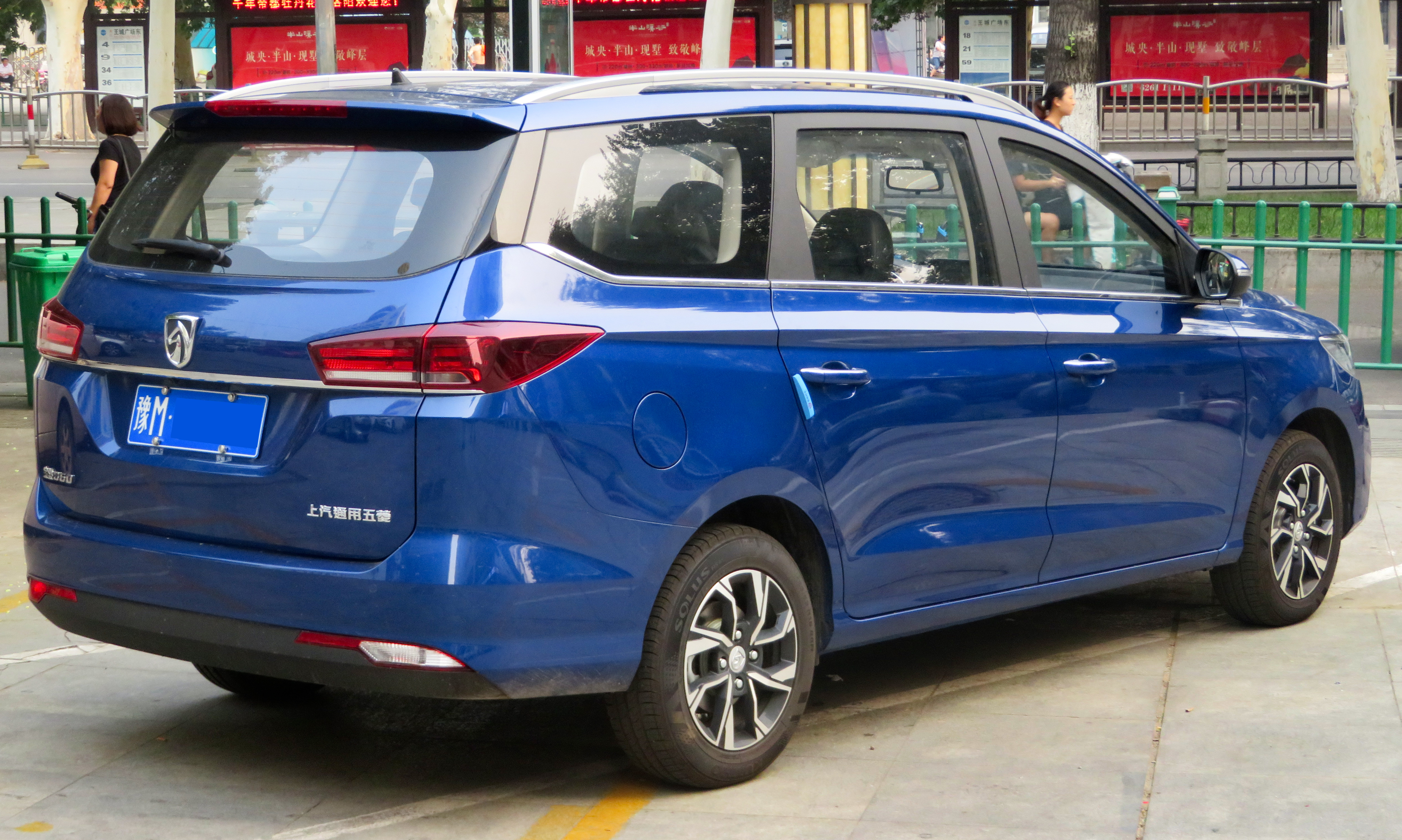
2018 Baojun 360 1.5L

It is powered by a 1.5 L naturally aspirated I4 engine that produces 82 kW (110 hp; 111 PS) and 146.5 N⋅m (108 lbf⋅ft) of torque. The 360 has a claimed maximum cargo space of 1,350 L (82,382 cu in).

== Sales ==
Year	China
2023	20
2024	2
2025	9
