= Baojun 730 =

Minivan produced by SAIC-GM-Wuling

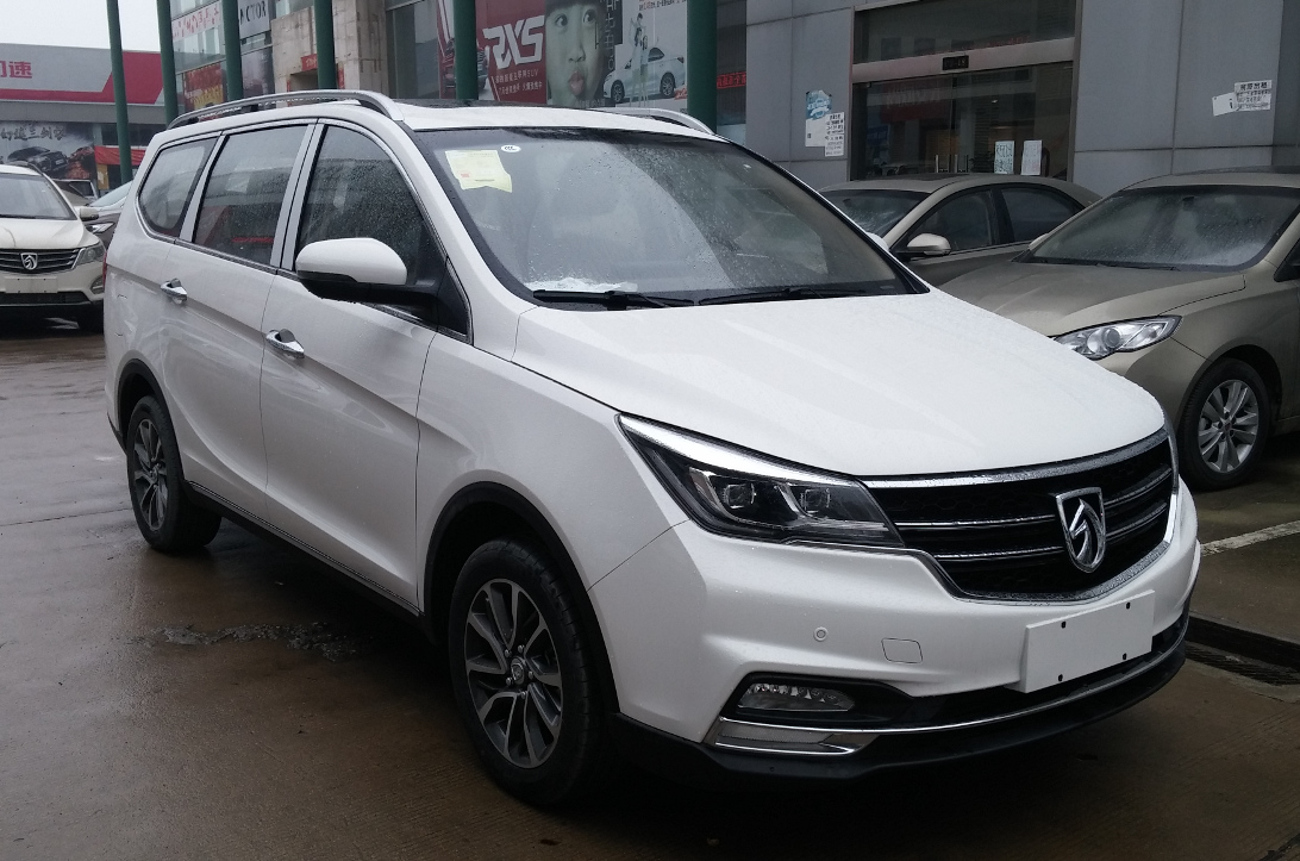

Overview
- Manufacturer: SAIC-GM-Wuling
- Also called: Wuling 730 (China, 2020–2021); Wuling Cortez (Indonesia, Brunei, Bangladesh)
- Production: 2014–present

Body and chassis
- Class: Minivan
- Body style: 5-door minivan
- Layout: Front-engine, front-wheel-drive

Chronology
- Successor: Baojun RM-5; Wuling Starlight 730

The Baojun 730 (Chinese: 宝骏730; pinyin: Bǎojùn 730) is a minivan produced by SAIC-GM-Wuling through the Baojun brand. The 730 was launched at the 2014 Auto China and developed at the SAIC-GM-Wuling Chinese joint venture specifically for the Chinese market. Baojun sold 250,000 units of the car in the first year of sales.

== First generation (2014) ==
First generation
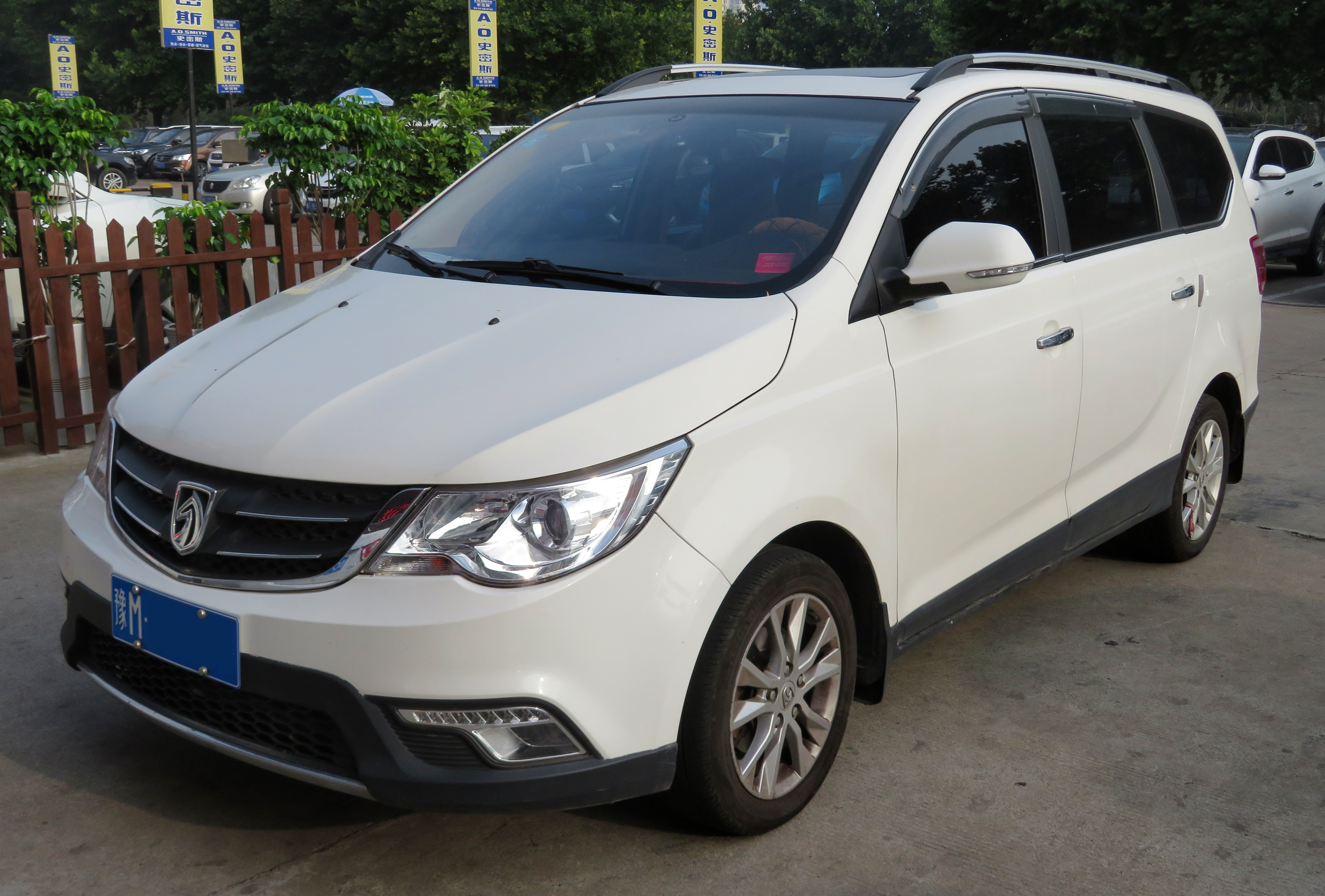

Overview
- Also called: Wuling 730 (2020–2021)
- Production: 2014–2017 (Baojun 730); 2020–2021 (Wuling 730)
- Assembly: China: Liuzhou, Guangxi

Powertrain
- Engine: Petrol: 1.5 L L2B I4; 1.8 L LJ479QNE2 I4
- Power output: 82 kW (110 hp; 111 PS) (L2B); 101 kW (135 hp; 137 PS) (LJ479QNE2)
- Transmission: 5-speed manual; 6-speed manual; 5-speed semi-automatic

Dimensions
- Wheelbase: 2,750 mm (108.3 in)
- Length: 4,710 mm (185.4 in)
- Width: 1,780 mm (70.1 in)
- Height: 1,745 mm (68.7 in)
- Kerb weight: 1,340–1,410 kg (2,954–3,109 lb)

The first-generation 730 is available in two four-cylinder engine options: a 1.5-litre (1,485 cc) engine producing 82 kW (110 hp; 111 PS) and 146 N⋅m (108 lbf⋅ft) of torque and a 1.8-litre (1,796 cc) unit producing 101 kW (135 hp; 137 PS). The suspension system was tuned by Lotus.

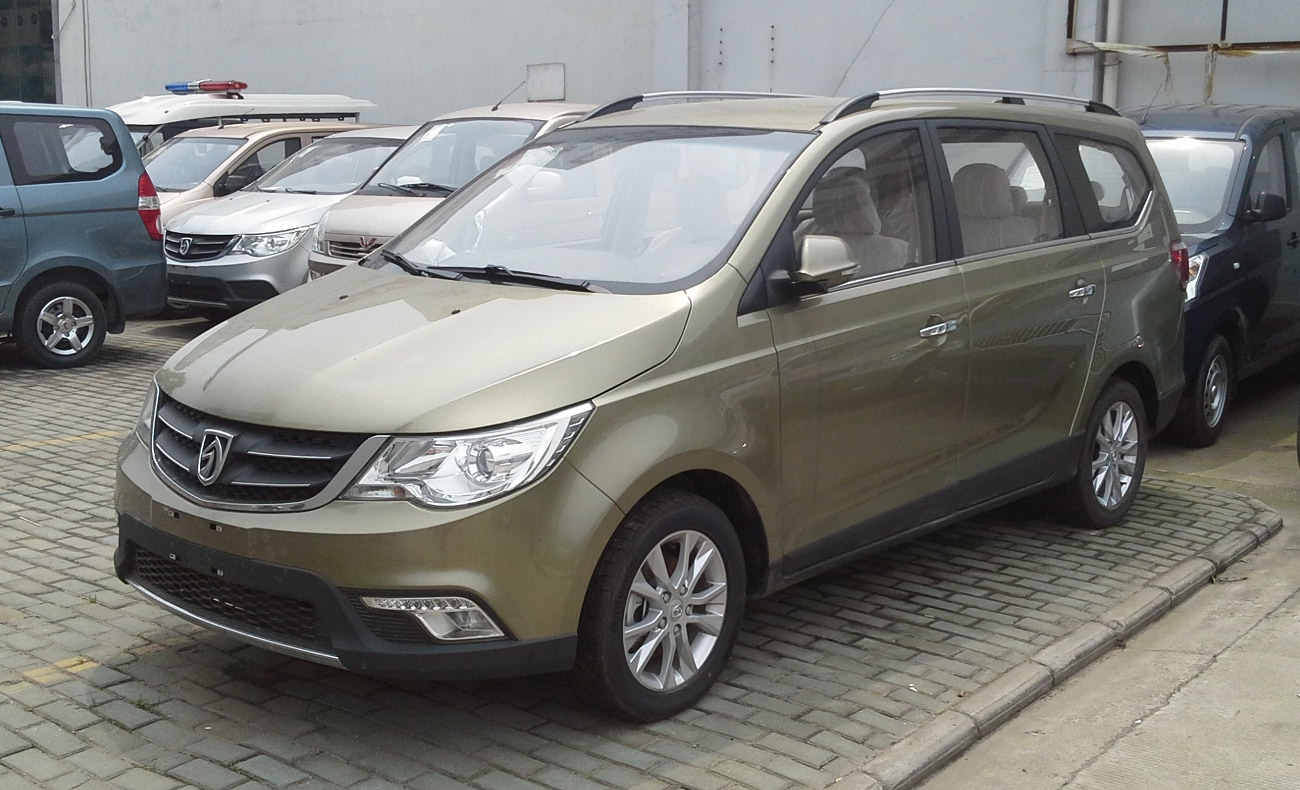
Baojun 730 (pre-facelift)

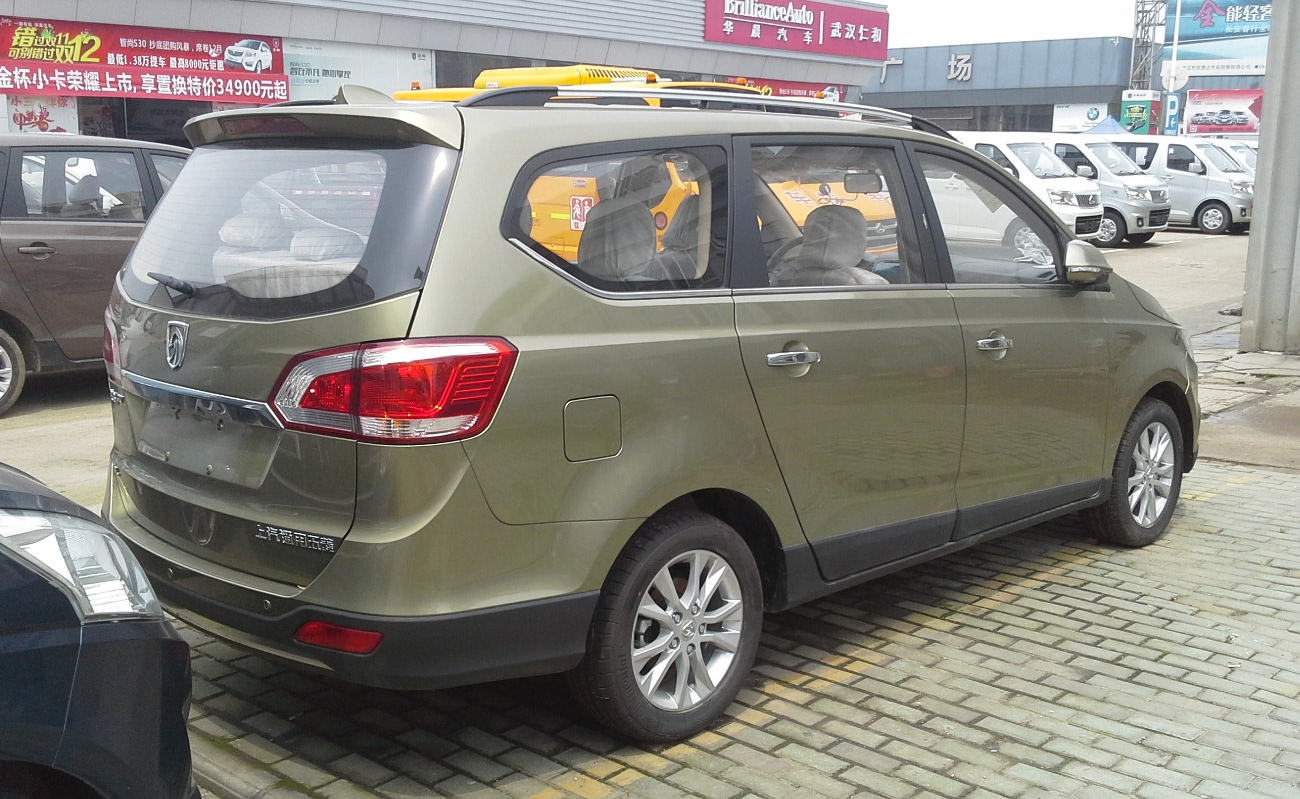
730 (pre-facelift)

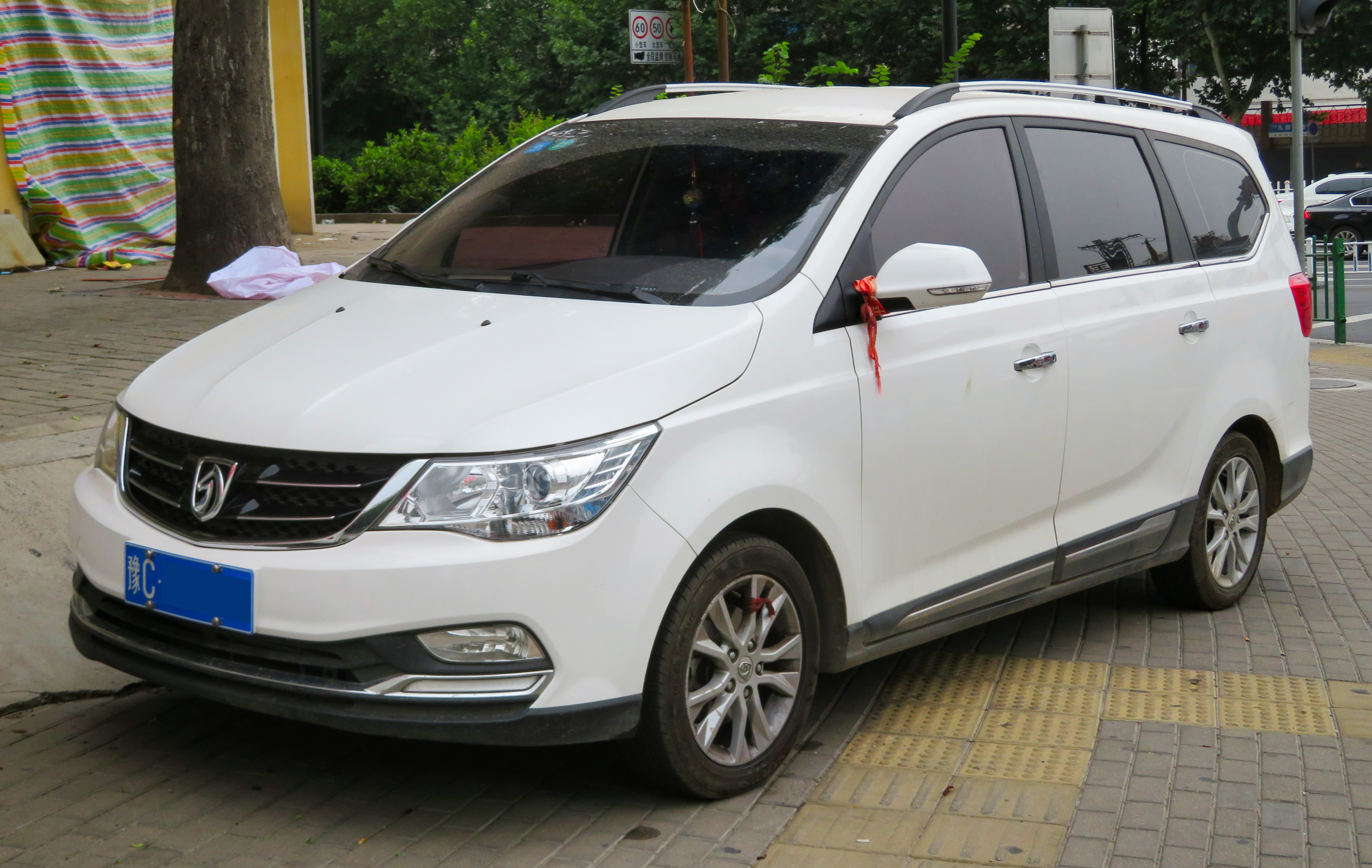
730 (facelift)

== Second generation (2017) ==
Second generation
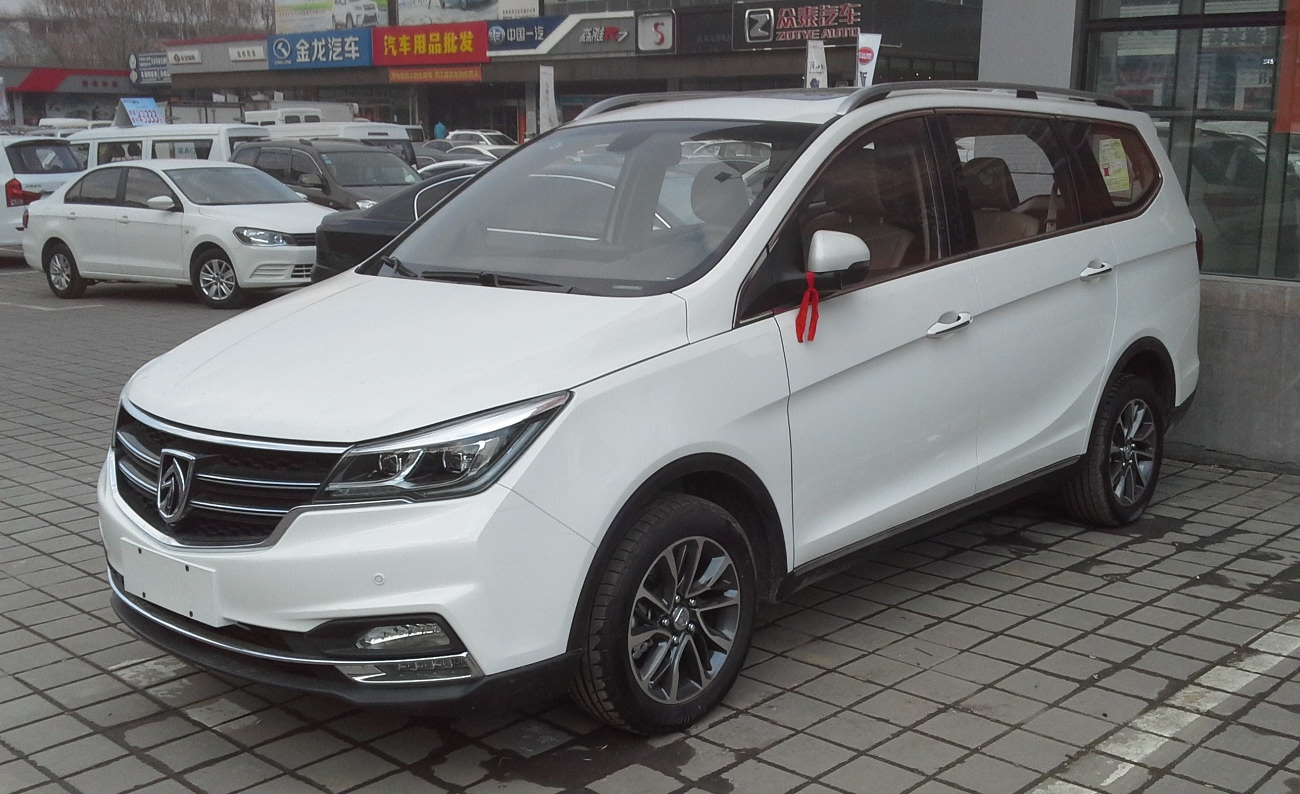

Overview
- Model code: CN210M
- Also called: Wuling Cortez (Indonesia, 2018–present; Brunei, 2021–present)
- Production: 2017–present
- Assembly: China: Liuzhou, Guangxi; Indonesia: Cikarang, West Java (SGMW Indonesia)

Powertrain
- Engine: Petrol: 1.5 L L2B I4; 1.5 L LJO turbo I4; 1.8 L LJ479QNE2 I4
- Electric motor: Integrated Motor Generator
- Power output: 77–82 kW (103–110 hp; 105–111 PS) (L2B); 103–114 kW (138–153 hp; 140–155 PS) (LJO); 96 kW (129 hp; 131 PS) (LJ479QNE2)
- Transmission: 5-speed manual (1.5 L); 6-speed manual (1.5 L, 1.5 L turbo and 1.8 L); 5-speed automated manual (1.8 L); 6-speed dual-clutch (1.5 L turbo); CVT (1.5 L turbo)
- Hybrid drivetrain: 48V mild hybrid
- Battery: Lithium Ion

Dimensions
- Wheelbase: 2,750 mm (108.3 in)
- Length: 4,780 mm (188.2 in)
- Width: 1,765–1,780 mm (69.5–70.1 in) (730); 1,816 mm (71.5 in) (Cortez)
- Height: 1,740–1,775 mm (68.5–69.9 in) (730); 1,755 mm (69.1 in) (Cortez)
- Kerb weight: 1,420–1,564 kg (3,131–3,448 lb)

Chronology
- Successor: Baojun RM-5; Wuling Starlight 730

The second-generation 730 was announced with an updated powertrain options and additional improvements in late November 2017. Apart from the engines available from the first-generation model, a turbocharged 1.5-litre four-cylinder engine and a six-speed dual-clutch transmission options were added. The engine produces 110 kW (148 hp; 150 PS) and 230 N⋅m (170 lbf⋅ft) of torque. The second-generation 730 also has a multi-link rear suspension.

In November 2018, a 48V mild hybrid variant was added to the line up. It is only available for the 1.5-litre turbo engine and paired to a 6-speed manual transmission. The 1.8-litre model was also discontinued.

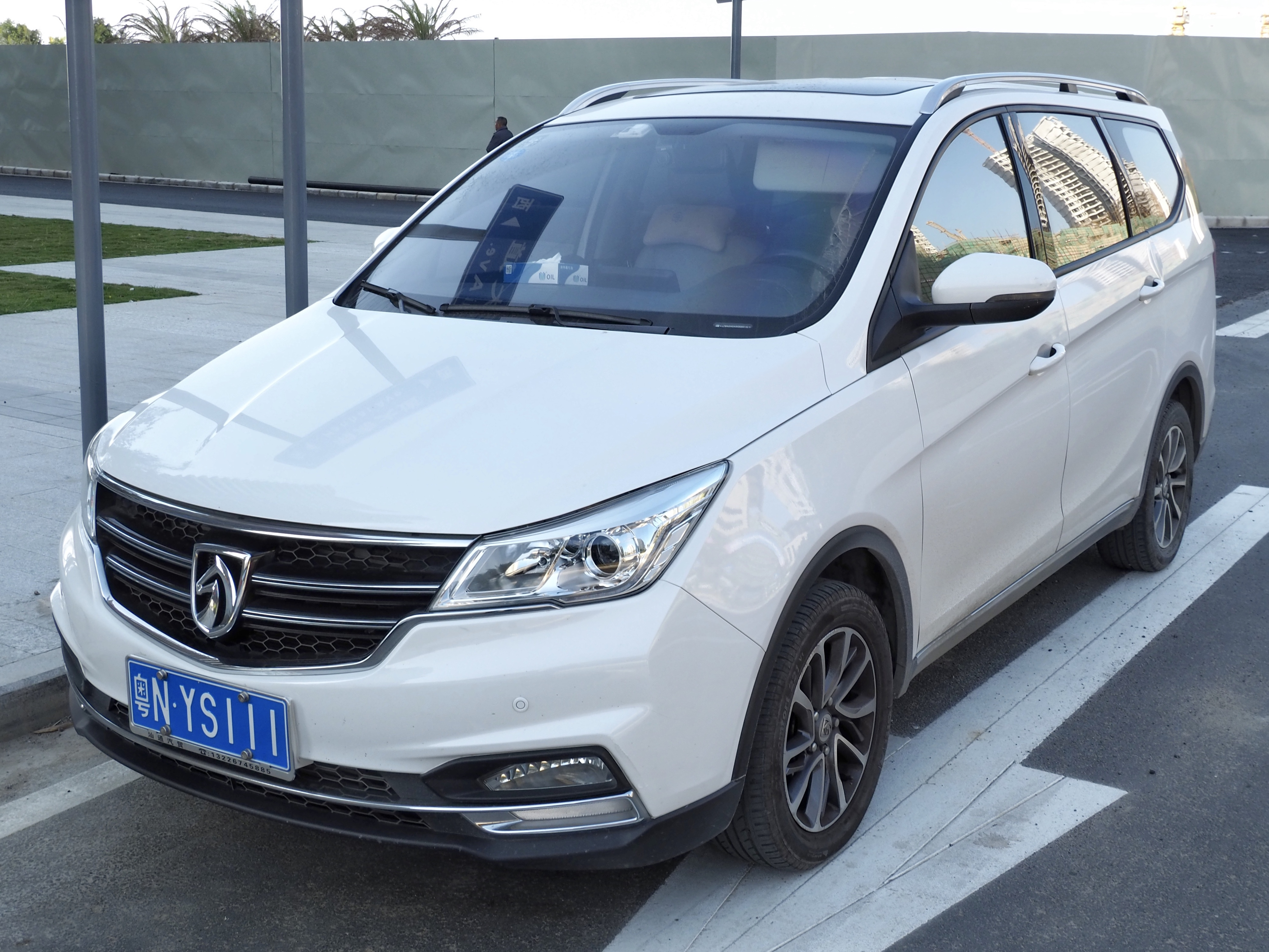
Front view

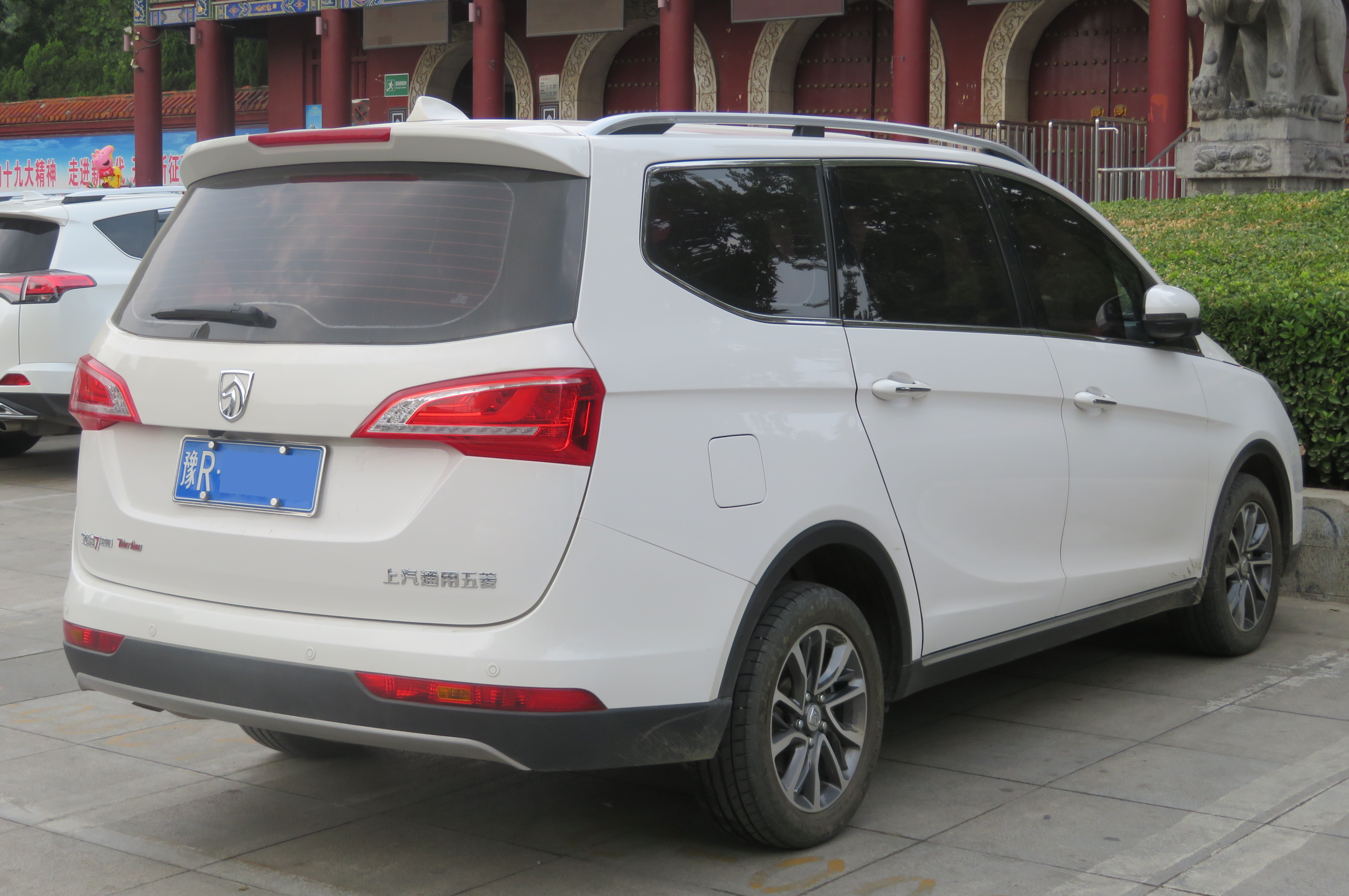
Rear view

=== Wuling Cortez ===
In Indonesia, the second-generation 730 is marketed under Wuling marque as the Wuling Cortez. The name "Cortez" is taken from Spanish word "cortés", which means "courteous" in English. The car was launched on 8 February 2018 with two trim levels; C and L. Initially, there is only one engine option, a 1.8-litre (1,798 cc) engine producing 96 kW (129 hp; 131 PS) and 174 N⋅m (128 lbf⋅ft) of torque mated to either a 6-speed manual transmission or a 5-speed automated manual unit (i-AMT) developed by Aisin. The 1.5-litre engine option was added in April 2018 with a sole 6-speed manual transmission, it is only available for the C trim and new S trim as the base model.

The "Cortez CT" with a turbocharged 1.5-litre engine option was made available from April 2019. It is mated to a continuously variable transmission sourced from Bosch. The car also received several improvement such as new front grille, new interior colour, one push start-stop button, keyless entry and emergency stop signal. Later in July 2020, both the 1.5-litre and 1.8-litre naturally aspirated engines were discontinued and leaving the turbocharged 1.5-litre unit as the sole powertrain option. The base model CT S was later added to the line up in the same month. Compared to the old S trim, the engine cover, engine hood insulation and third row USB port were deleted, but it received CVT transmission just like the higher trims.

In February 2021, the Cortez CT was launched in Brunei Darussalam.

The Indonesian market Cortez was updated in March 2022 to include MyWuling+ vehicle telematics system and WIND (Wuling Indonesian Command) voice command system, which only supports the Indonesian language. It is also improved with new interior color, alloy wheels, 10.25-inch LCD, anti pinch power windows, silver Wuling emblem and multipurpose seat tray on the second row. The "CT" naming was removed, the car is now sold with S, CE and EX trims.

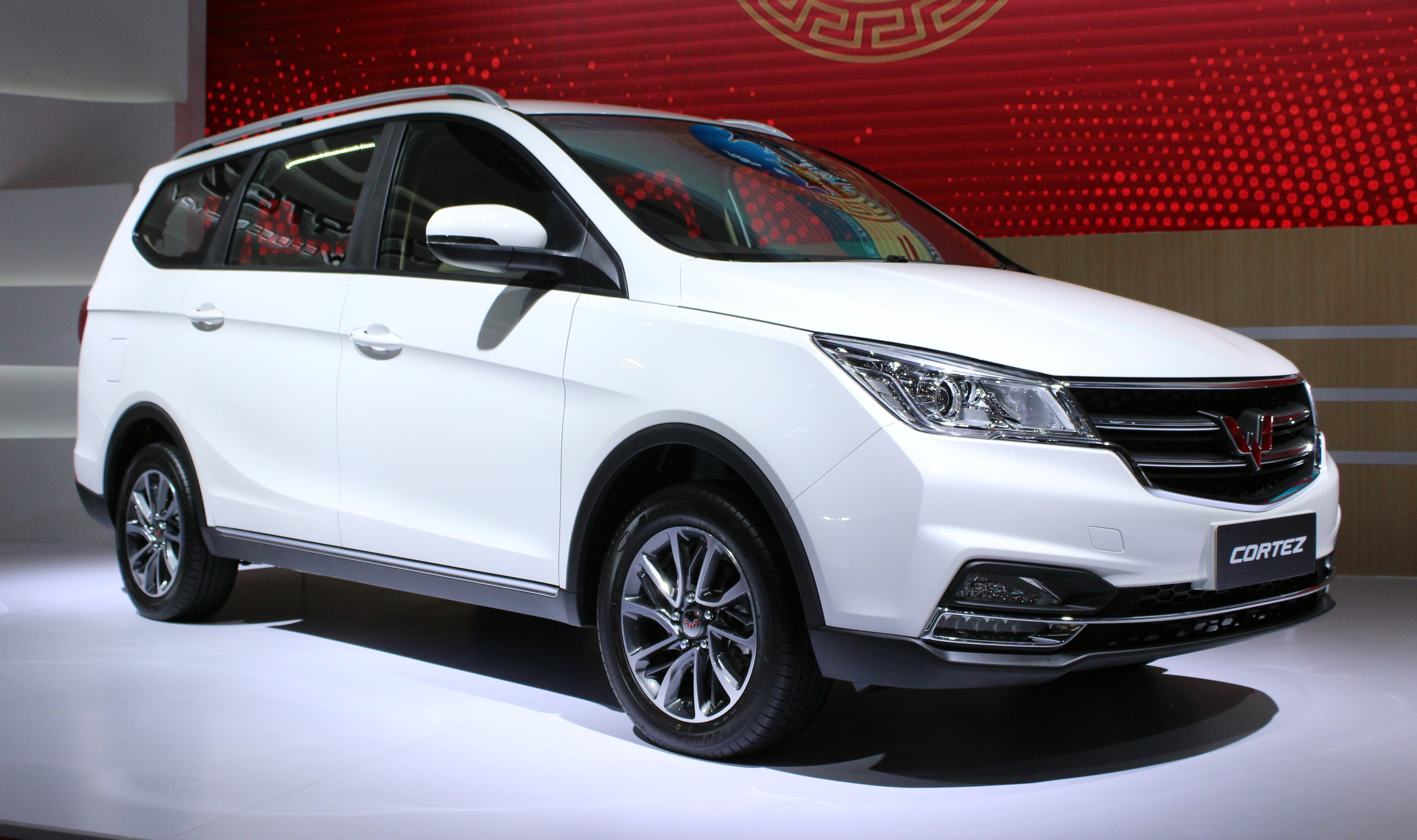
2018 Wuling Cortez 1.5 C (Indonesia)

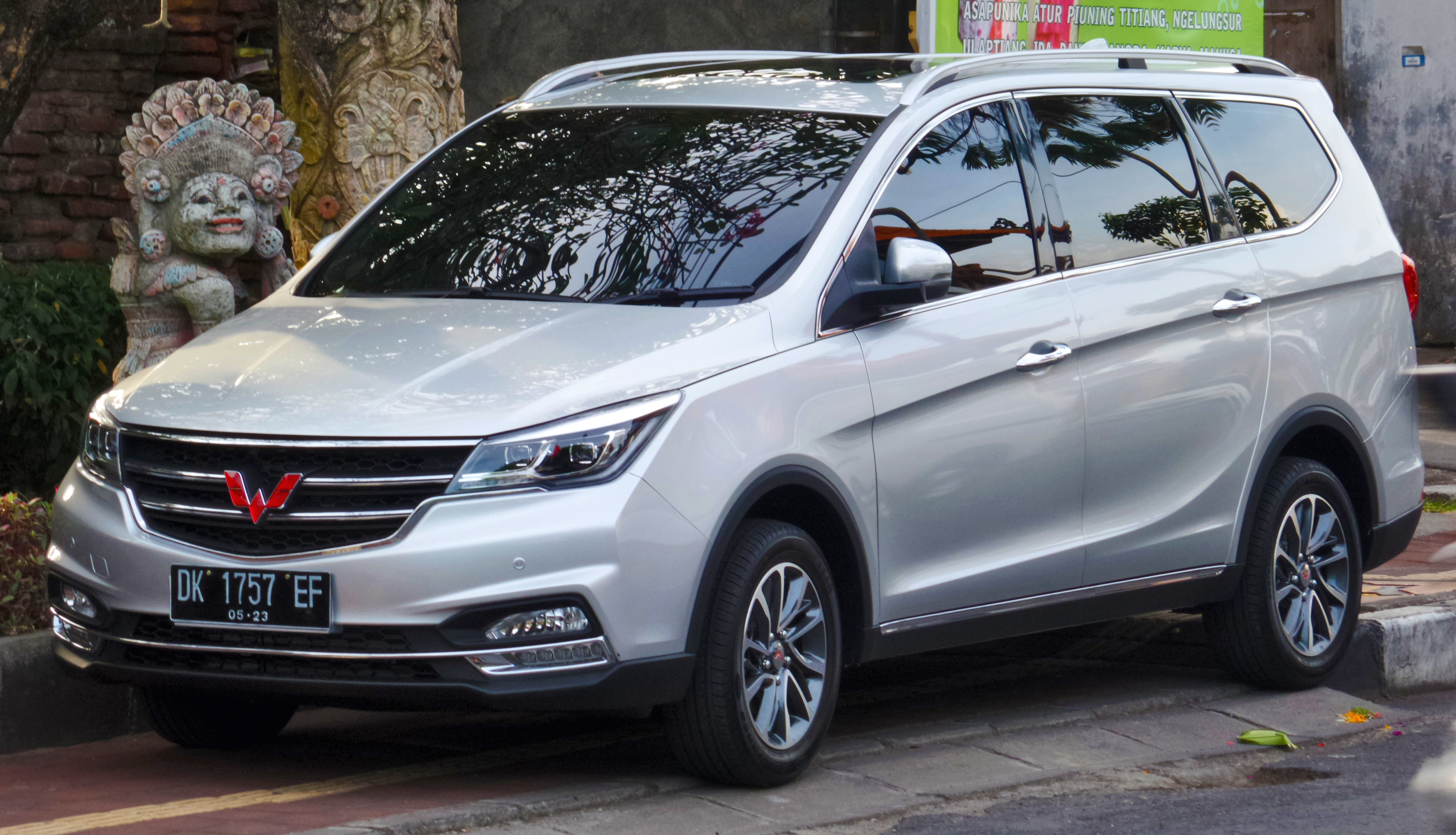
2018 Cortez 1.8 L (Indonesia)

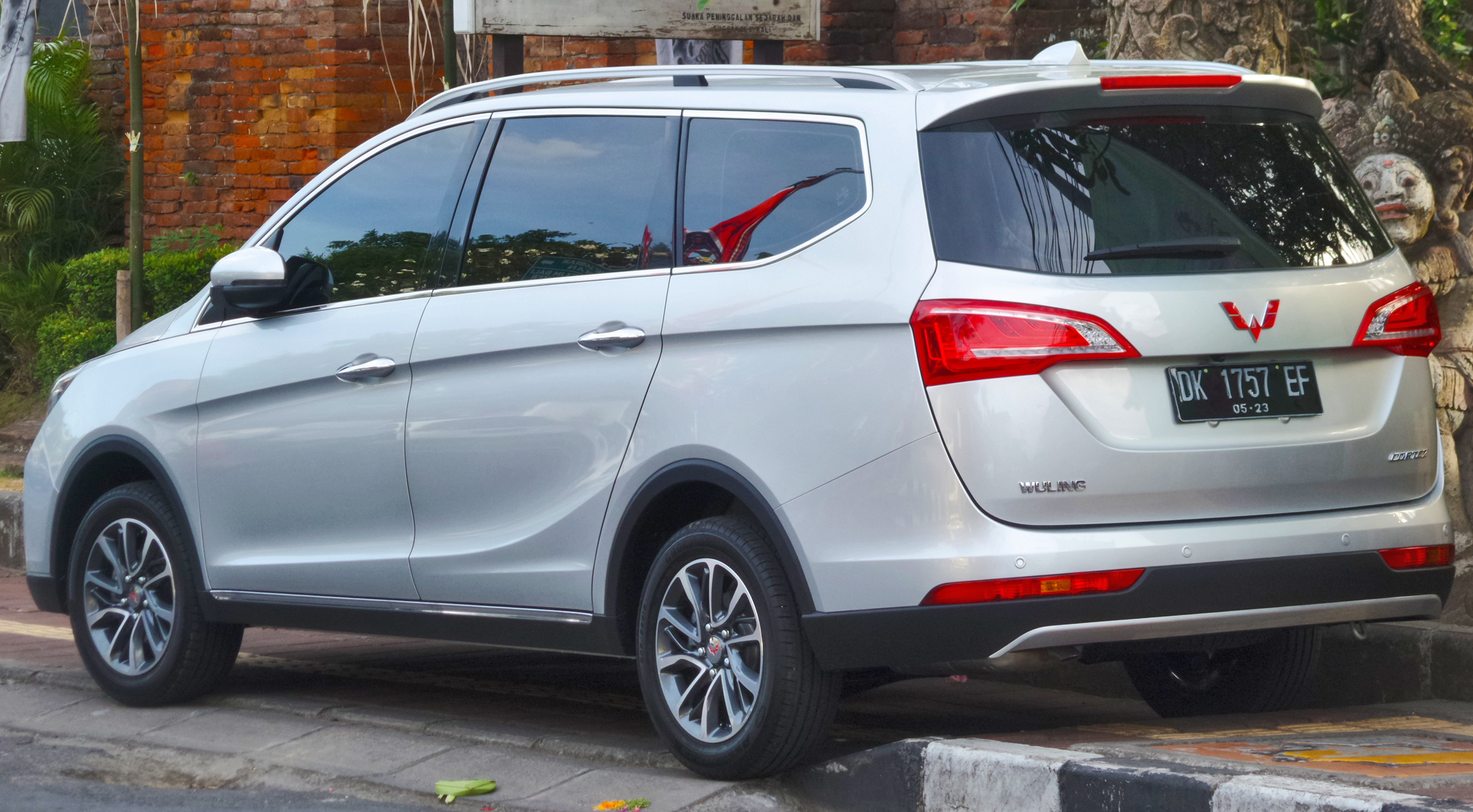
2018 Cortez 1.8 L (Indonesia)

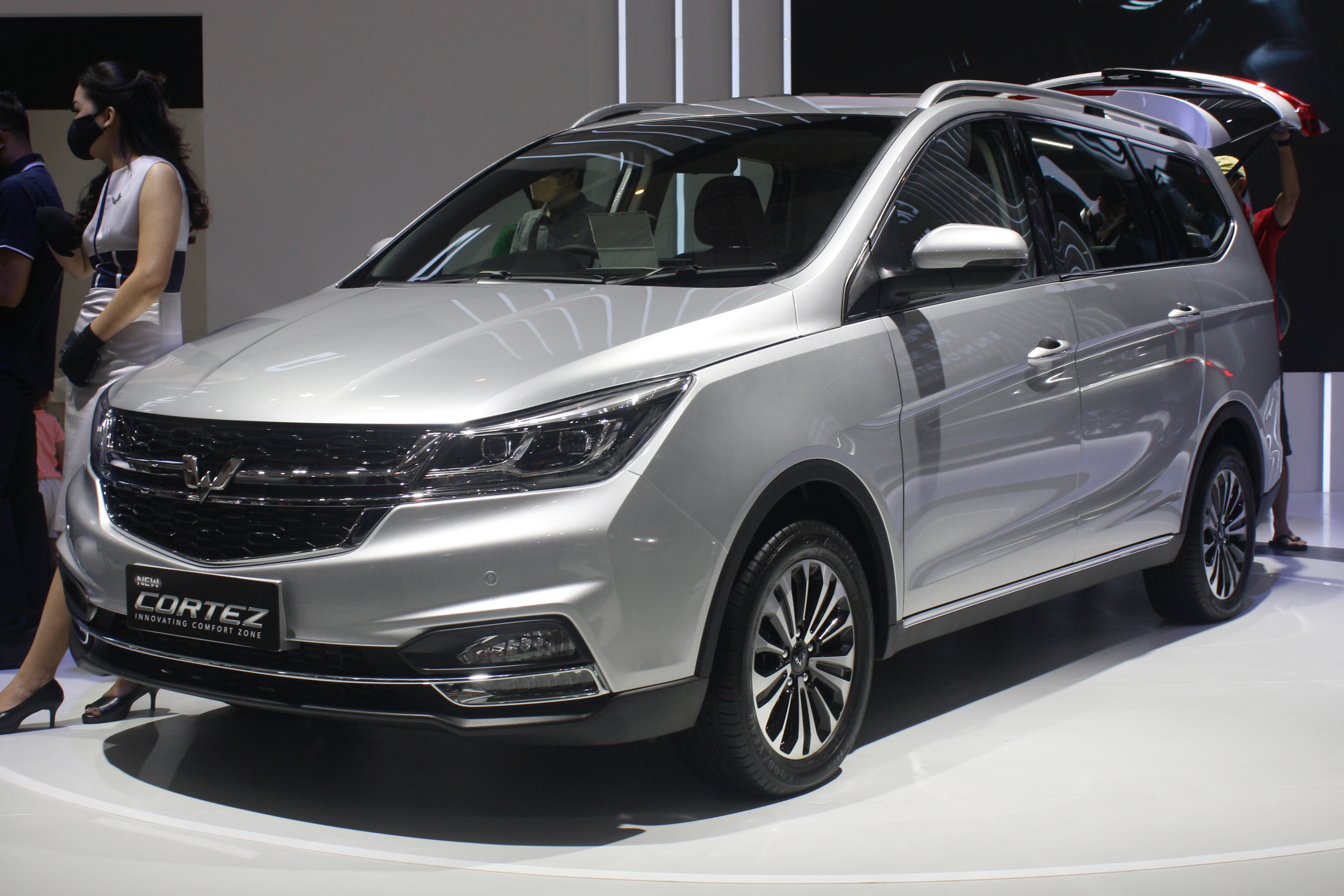
2022 Cortez EX 1.5T L (Indonesia)

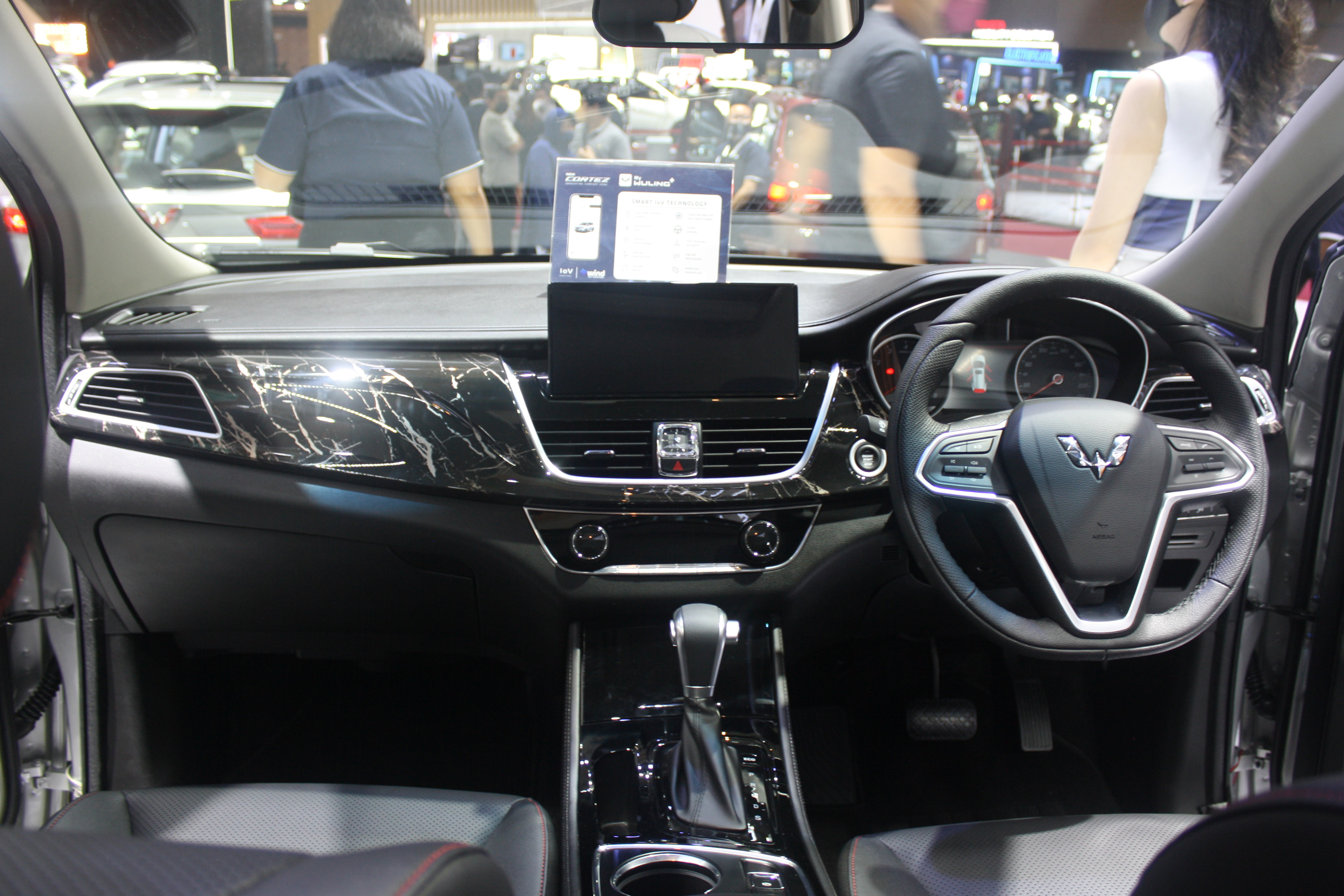
2022 Cortez EX interior (Indonesia)

== Sales ==
Calendar year	China	Indonesia
2014	120,089	
2015	321,069	
2016	370,169	
2017	275,277	
2018	111,507	5,857
2019	98,912	3,160
2020	50,240	5,676
2021	25,625	4,423
2022	5,965	3,905
2023	41	824
2024	3	255
2025		768
