= 360° (Chelo album) =

Studio album by Chelo
- Released: June 19, 2006 (digitally); June 25, 2006 (physically)
- Genres: Latino, pop, world
- Length: 39:59
- Label: Sony BMG (US Latin)
- Producers: Chelo and Nir Seroussi (exec.)

Singles from 360°
- 1. "Cha Cha" Released: January 31, 2006; 2. "Yummy" Released: 2006; 3. "Un Corazón (One Heart)" Released: 2007

360° (sometimes credited as 360 Degrees or simply 360) is the debut studio album by Puerto Rican recording artist Chelo, released in 2006. The following singles from this album include "Yummy" and "Un Corazón". The album is recorded in Spanglish.

== Track listing ==
No.	Title	Writer(s)	Producer(s)	Length
1.	"Un Corazón (One Heart)" (See note: A)	Chelo, Genzō, Willie Colon, Hector Lavoe	Genzō	3:06
2.	"U Got Me"	Genzō	Genzō	4:05
3.	"Can't Let It Go"	Kenneth Pratt, Neely Dikkins Jr., Vito Colapietro	The Co-Stars	4:06
4.	"Slow Motion"	Mischke, Colapietro, Neely Dikkins Jr.	The Co-Stars, Mischke	4:32
5.	"Cha Cha"	Chelo, Jeeve, Nir Seroussi	Jeeve	3:13
6.	"Voodoo" (featuring Lova Boy)	Chelo, Genzō, Lova Boy	Genzō	3:23
7.	"Fantasy"	Genzō, Cheryl Yie	Genzō	5:03
8.	"Just Maybe"	Chelo, Jeeve, Travis House, Seroussi	Jeeve	4:12
9.	"Tus Ojos (Your Eyes)"	Chelo, Genzō, Rogelio Vélez	Genzō	4:07
10.	"We Comes 2 Party" (featuring Medeiros)	Genzō, Medeiros, Chelo	Genzō	3:14
11.	"Yummy" (See note: B)	Chelo, Genzō	Genzō	3:42
12.	"Touch 2nite"	Chelo, Genzō, Alex Ocaña	Genzō	3:50
13.	"Cha Cha (Spanglish Version)"	Chelo, Jeeve, Seroussi		3:15

Notes

- A This song contains a sample of "La Murga" as performed by Hector Lavoe.
- B A remixed version of this song was also released featuring Too $hort

== Personnel ==
Adapted from the 360° media notes.

- Don C. Tyler: mastering (Precision Mastering, L.A.)
- Linda Crespo: art direction, project manager
- Bryan Pérez: project manager
- Erika Nuño: A&R coordinator
- Raúl Vega: photography
- Sam Riddle: management

== Chart positions ==
=== Album ===
Chart (2006)	Debut position
Hungarian Albums (MAHASZ)	40
U.S. Billboard Top Heatseekers	18
