= Aira (disambiguation) =

Aira is a genus of Old World plants.

Aira or 姶良 may also refer to:

- Aira, Kagoshima, a city in Japan
- Aira, Kagoshima (Aira District), a former town in the Aira District, Kagoshima, Japan
- Aira, Kagoshima (Kimotsuki District), a former town in the Kimotsuki District, Kagoshima, Japan
- Aira District, Kagoshima, a district in Japan
- Aira Caldera, a caldera in Japan
- Aira Force, a waterfall in the Lake District, United Kingdom

== People with the given name ==
=== Real people ===
- Aira Azman (born 2004), Malaysian professional squash player
- Aira Bermudez (born 1983), Filipina dancer and actress
- Aira Ferreira (born 1997), Brazilian fashion model
- Aira Kaal (1911–1988), Estonian writer
- Aira Samulin (1927–2023), Finnish dance teacher and entrepreneur
- Aira Yūki (結城 アイラ, born 1981), Japanese singer

=== Fictional characters ===
- Aira Shiratori (白鳥 愛羅), a character in Dandadan
- Aira Shiratori (白取 愛良), a character in the visual novel Sekai to Sekai no Mannaka de

== People with the surname ==
- César Aira, Argentine author
- José Manuel Aira (born 1976), Spanish footballer
- Mitsuki Aira, Japanese techno-pop artist

== Other ==
- Aira (restaurant), a fine dining restaurant in Stockholm, Sweden
- AIRA, one of Roland Corporation's brand names announced in 2014
- Wuling Aira EV, a battery electric city car

== See also ==
- アイラ (disambiguation)
