= アイラ =

アイラ may refer to:

- Aira (given name)
  - Aira (Dragon Quest VII), a character in the video game Dragon Quest VII
- Ira (name)
- Isla (given name)
  - Isla (Plastic Memories), a character in the animation Plastic Memories
