= Chery QQ Ice Cream =

Battery electric city car

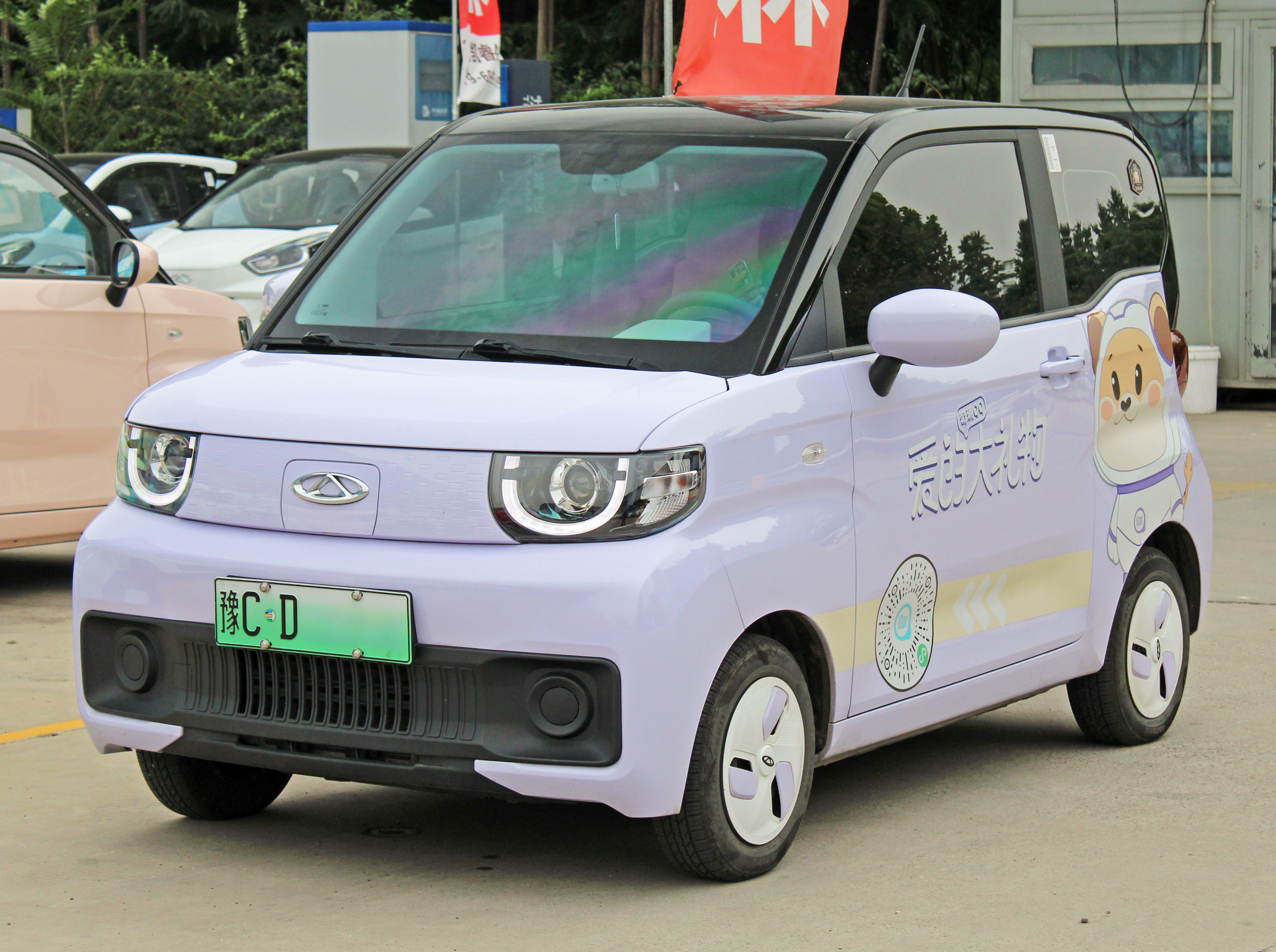

Overview
- Manufacturer: Chery
- Also called: Jetour Ice Cream (Philippines); Cenntro Avantier (Europe); MASADA QQ (South Korea); Aiqar QQ Ice Cream (Armenia, Bolivia, Cambodia, Curaçao, Georgia, Uzbekistan); Birba (Italy)
- Production: 2021–present
- Assembly: China

Body and chassis
- Class: City car (A)
- Body style: 3-door hatchback

Powertrain
- Electric motor: Permanent magnet synchronous motor
- Power output: 20 kW (27 hp; 27 PS)
- Transmission: 1-speed direct-drive
- Battery: 9.6 or 13.9 kWh Li-ion phosphate battery
- Range: Standard range 120 km NEDC; Long range 170 km NEDC

Dimensions
- Wheelbase: 1,960 mm (77.2 in)
- Length: 2,980 mm (117.3 in)
- Width: 1,496 mm (58.9 in)
- Height: 1,637 mm (64.4 in)
- Curb weight: 699–778 kg (1,541–1,715 lb)

The Chery QQ Ice Cream (Chinese: 奇瑞 QQ 冰淇淋; pinyin: Qíruì QQ Bīngqílín) is a battery electric city car manufactured by Chery since 2021.

== Overview ==
The Chery QQ Ice Cream was first showed in July 2021 in an ice cream-themed camouflage wrap and was described by the automaker as an SUV. The QQ Ice Cream was later revealed at the Chengdu Auto Show in August as the fourth new nameplate under the Chery QQ series of a small cars, intended to be a competitor of the slightly smaller and similarly shaped Wuling Hongguang Mini EV. The QQ Ice Cream is marketed towards the female car buyer demographic, and a variant for ride-sharing companies is planned to be offered. The QQ Ice Cream is expected to be sold at a starting price of ¥30.000 ($4,655) and will be one of the cheapest EVs to be on sale in China.

The QQ Ice Cream is the first Chery vehicle to use the automaker's iCar Ecology technology, which has signed deals with Chinese electronic manufacturer Haier and cloud computing company Alibaba Cloud to develop cloud-based internet of things services and connect the car to internet-connected devices at home or the office as well as nearby businesses.

The QQ Ice Cream was launched in the Philippines in 2023 under the Jetour badge.

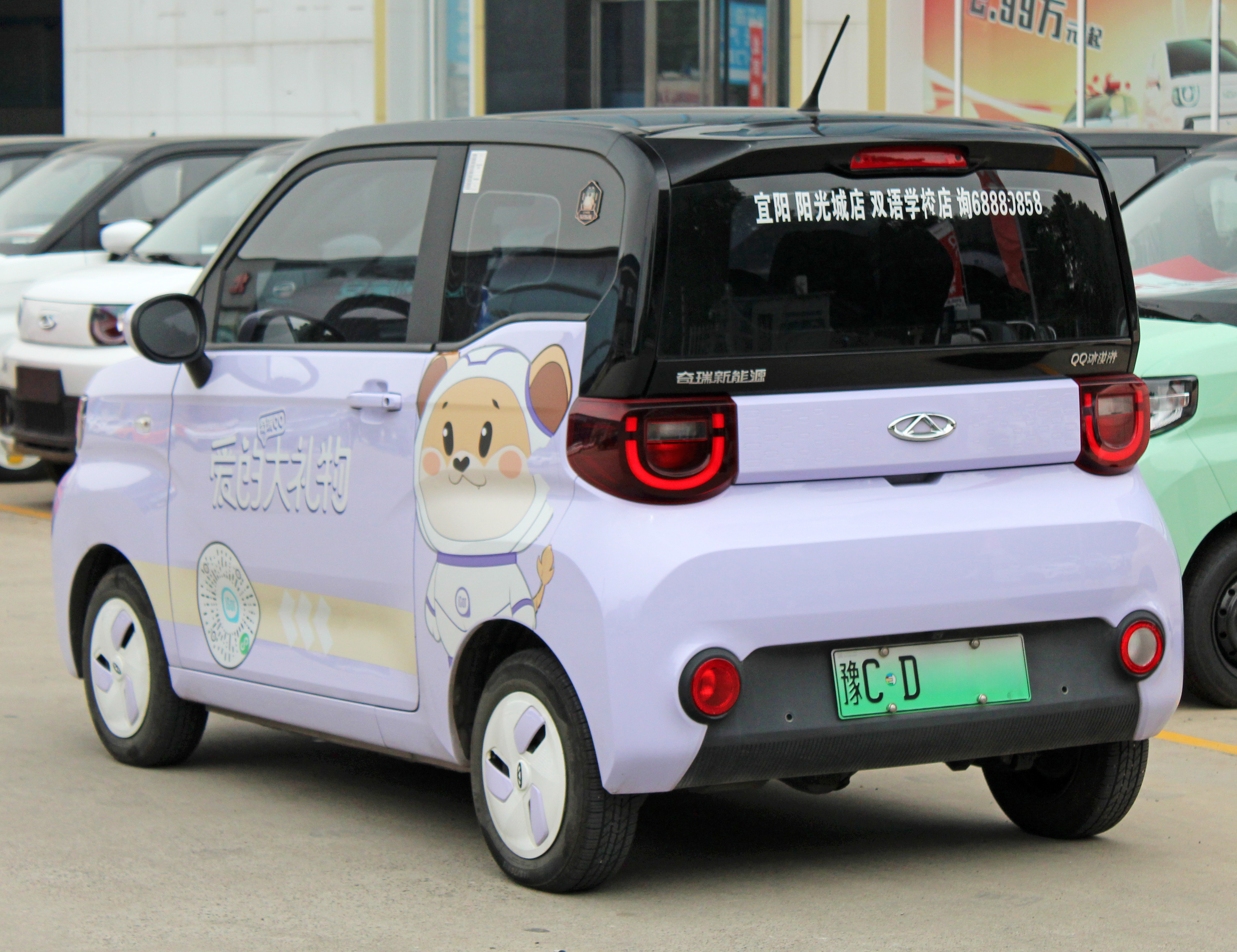
Rear view

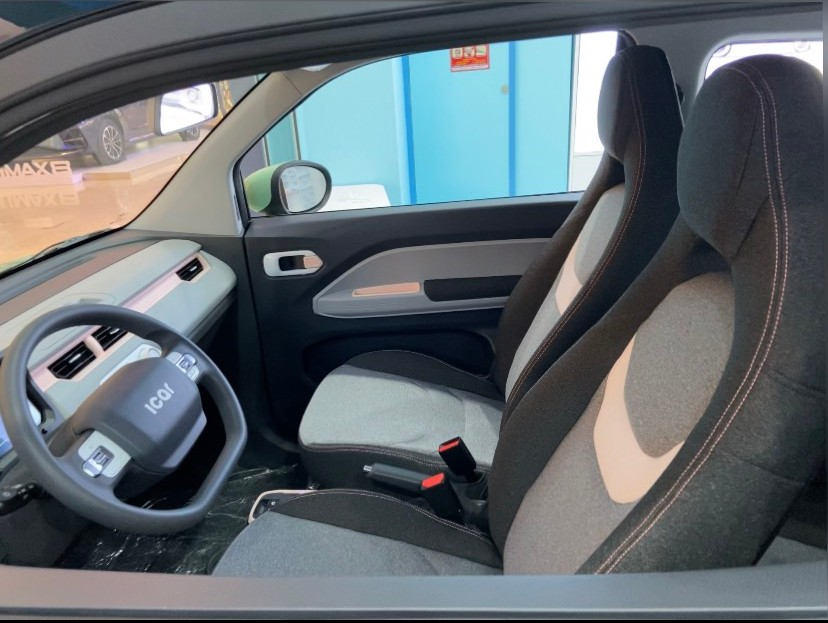
Interior

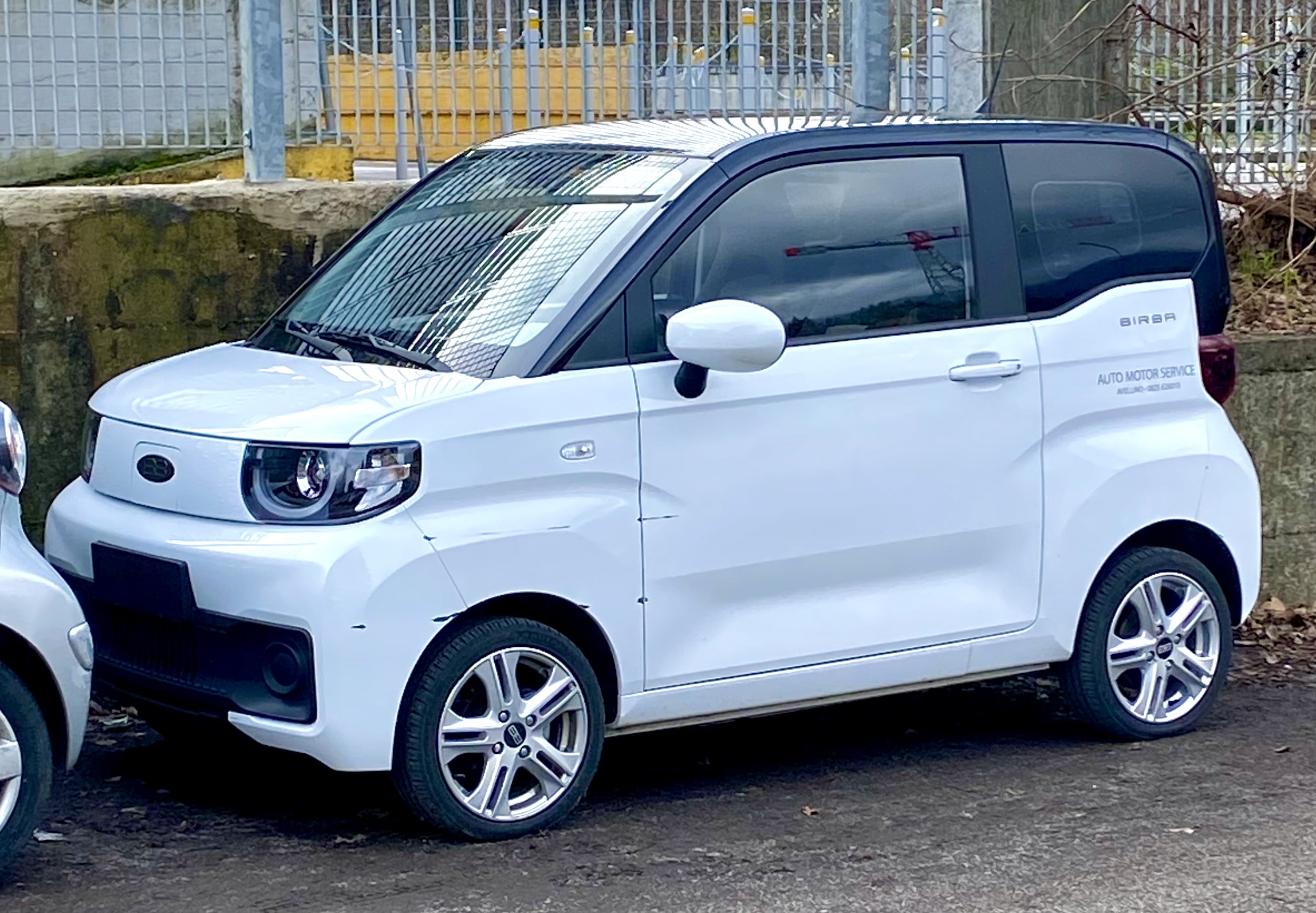
The Birba, rebadged version by DR Automobiles.

== Specifications ==
The QQ Ice Cream is powered by a 27 hp Chery TZ160XFDM13A electric motor, which uses a lithium iron phosphate battery pack. The car has an electric range of about 175 km (109 mi) and a top speed of 100 km/h (62 mph).

== Concepts ==
At the Chengdu Auto Show, Chery presented a racing-inspired concept alongside and based on the QQ Ice Cream, called the Chery QQ Ice Cream Lightning Edition. It features components such as a large rear wing, fender add-ons, side skirts, splitters, turbofan wheels, and a modified grille.

== Sales ==
Year	China
2023	64,669
2024	43,249
2025	27,688
