= Aira (restaurant) =

Restaurant in Stockholm, Sweden

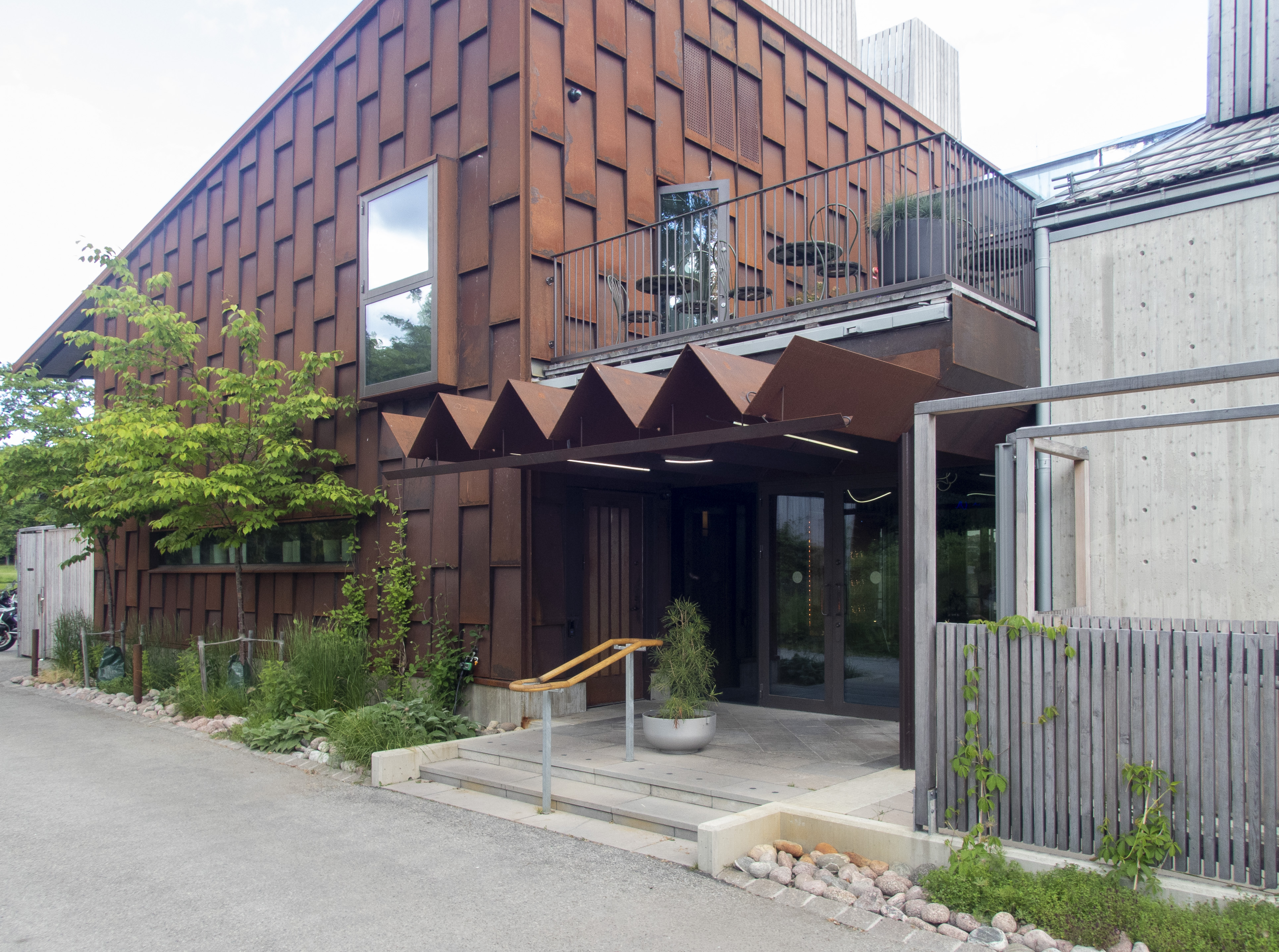
- Entrance to Aira in 2022
- Interactive map of Aira

Restaurant information
- Established: 17 March 2020; 6 years ago
- Rating: Michelin stars
- Location: Biskopsvägen 9, Stockholm, Sweden
- Coordinates: 59.320833°N 18.123611°E
- Website: aira.se

Aira, stylised as AIRA, is a fine dining restaurant in Stockholm, Sweden. Co-owned by chef Tommy Myllymäki and the Swedish restaurant group Svenska Brasserier, it opened on 17 March 2020. It has since received two Michelin stars.

== History ==
After five years in development, the restaurant was scheduled to open on 17 March 2020, in the midst of the COVID-19 pandemic. The restaurant was jointly owned by chef Tommy Myllymäki and the Swedish restaurant group Svenska Brasserier. It received its first Michelin star on 13 September 2021 and its second on 12 June 2023.

== Facilities ==
The building was constructed specifically for the restaurant and was designed by architect Jonas Bohlin. The exterior was designed to resemble a shipyard, featuring concrete and rust-coloured sheet metal.

== Reception ==
In a 2022 review in Svenska Dagbladet's Krogguiden, Aira was described as one of Sweden's most lavish restaurant ventures. It was given 5 out of 6 stars, with the reviewer highlighting culinary craftsmanship, balanced service, and nuanced flavors in a 13-course tasting menu focused on seasonal Scandinavian ingredients. However, the reviewer also felt that given the price level (the bill for two was over 10,000 SEK), there was a lack of bold or surprising flavours. Per Styregård listed Aira as among the 38 best restaurants in Stockholm in an article for Eater.
