= Aira Ferreira =

Brazilian fashion model (born 1997)

- Born: Aira Ferreira; 21 April 1997 (age 29); Fortaleza, Brazil
- Occupation: Model
- Years active: 2017–present
- Modeling information
- Height: 5 ft 10.5 in (1.79 m)
- Hair color: Brown
- Eye color: Brown<
- Agency: Supreme Management (New York, Paris); Elo Management (São Paulo); Wide Models (Fortaleza); Women Direct (Milan); View Management (Barcelona); Elite Model Management (London); 20 Model Management (Cape Town); Model Management (Hamburg); Freedom Models (Los Angeles)

Aira Ferreira (born April 21, 1997) is a Brazilian fashion model.

== Career ==
Ferreira debuted at Alberta Ferretti in 2016. The next year she walked for Christian Dior, Tommy Hilfiger, JW Anderson, Roland Mouret, Missoni, Versace, Bottega Veneta, Dolce & Gabbana, Saint Laurent, Coach New York, Elie Saab, Chanel, Giambattista Valli, Victoria Beckham, Brandon Maxwell, Tory Burch, Erdem, Azzedine Alaïa, Zara, and Tom Ford. Ferreira appeared in an Elle Italia editorial in June 2019.

Ferreira has modeled in advertising campaigns for brands including Michael Kors, Calvin Klein Collection, and Prabal Gurung. Ferreira was also cast in campaigns for Prada.

Ferreira currently ranks as a "Money Girl" on models.com.
