= Wuling Hongguang Mini EV =

Battery electric city car

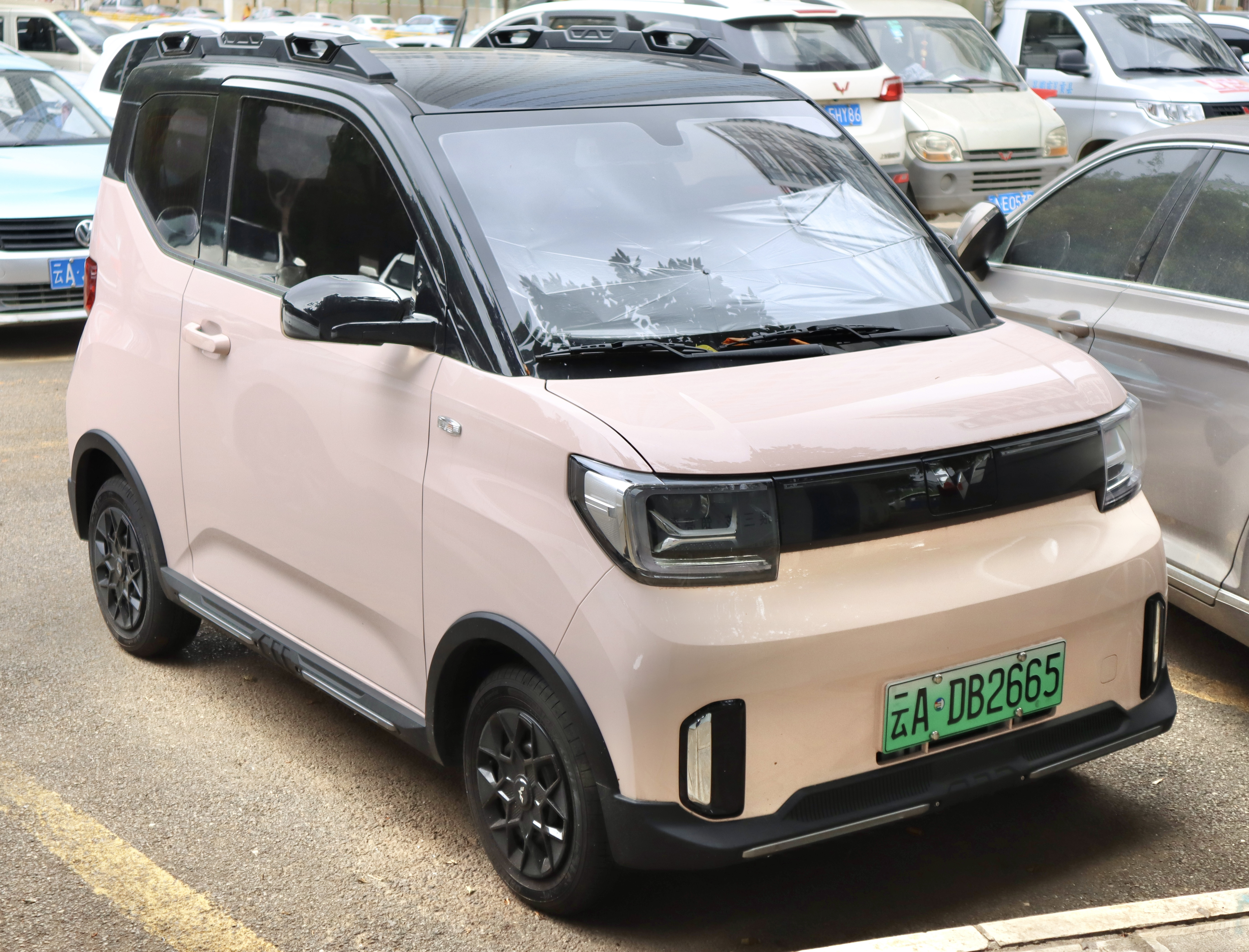
- 2022 Wuling Hongguang Mini EV GameBoy Edition

Overview
- Manufacturer: SAIC-GM-Wuling
- Production: 2020–present

Body and chassis
- Class: City car (A)
- Body style: 3-door hatchback; 5-door hatchback (2024–present); 2-door convertible (2022)
- Layout: Rear-motor, rear-wheel-drive

The Wuling Hongguang Mini EV (Chinese: 五菱宏光MINIEV) is a battery electric city car manufactured by SAIC-GM-Wuling since 2020. Retail deliveries began in China in July 2020. As of February 2023, global sales since inception have passed 1.1 million units, and the Mini EV has become the best-selling electric car in China.

== First generation (2020) ==
First generation
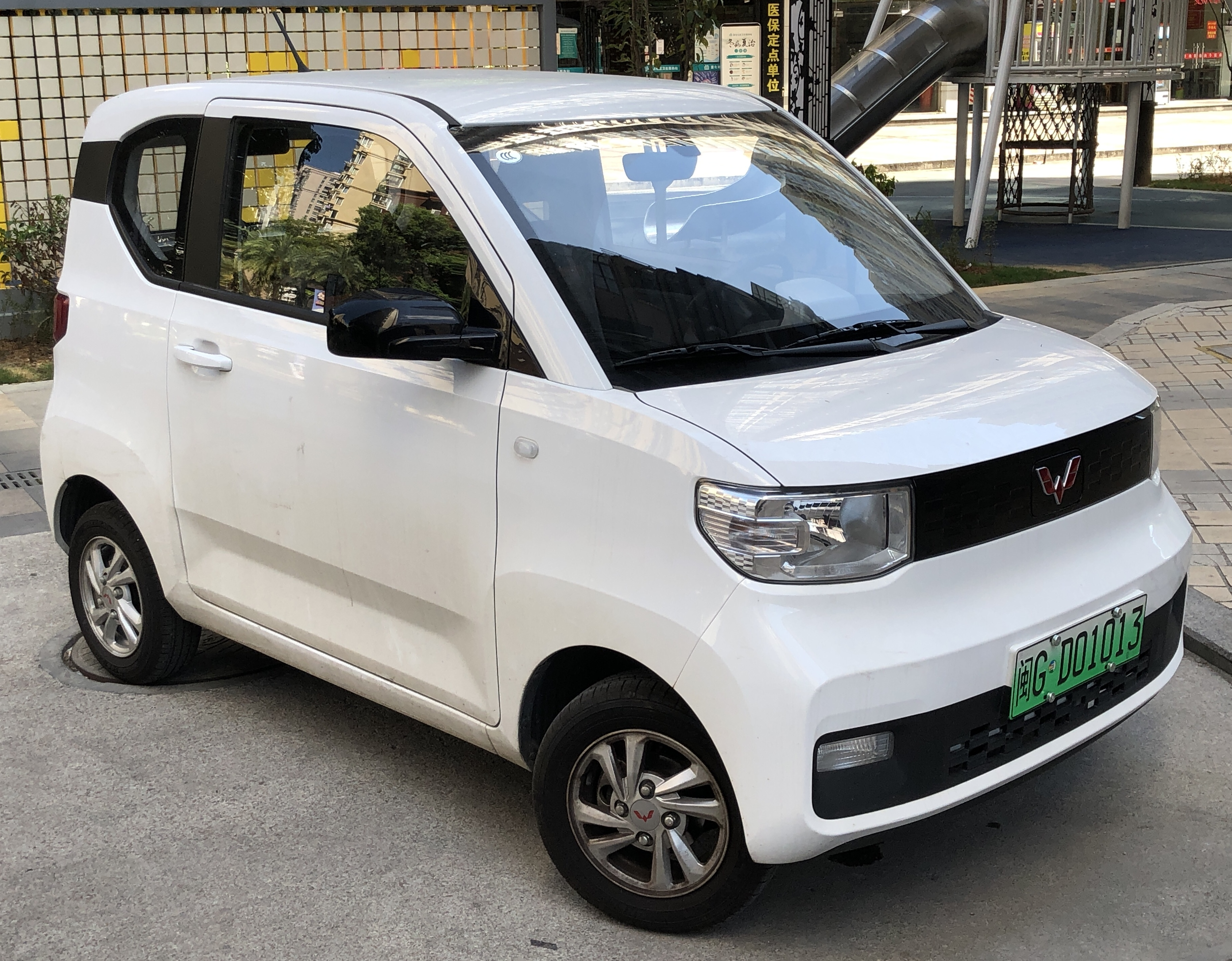

Overview
- Model code: E50
- Also called: Freze Nikrob (Lithuania); Rainwoll RW10 (Turkey); SGMW Mini EV (Vietnam); Wuling Macaron/Gameboy (Philippines)
- Production: 2020–present
- Assembly: China: Qingdao, Shandong; Liuzhou, Guangxi (SGMW); Lithuania: Vilnius (Nikrob UAB); Vietnam: Hưng Yên (TMT Motors)

Body and chassis
- Layout: Rear-motor, rear-wheel-drive
- Platform: SGMW Global Small Electric Vehicle
- Related: Wuling Air EV; Baojun E100; Baojun E200; Baojun E300

Powertrain
- Electric motor: 1x1XM AC permanent magnet synchronous motor
- Power output: 15–30 kW (20–40 hp; 20–41 PS)
- Transmission: 1-speed direct-drive
- Battery: 9 kWh NMC SinoEV; 9.3 kWh LFP Ningfu/SinoEV; 13.4 kWh NMC SinoEV; 13.4 kWh LFP Gotion/Ningu; 13.8 kWh NMC SinoEV; 13.9 kWh LFP Key Power; 17.3 kWh LFP Gotion/GPE/Ningfu; 26.5 kWh LFP SinoEV/Key Power/GPE
- Electric range: 120–300 km (75–186 mi) (NEDC)

Dimensions
- Wheelbase: 1,940 mm (76 in); 2,010 mm (79 in) (GameBoy, Cabrio)
- Length: 2,917 mm (114.8 in); 3,061–3,089 mm (120.5–121.6 in) (GameBoy); 3,059 mm (120.4 in) (Cabrio)
- Width: 1,493 mm (58.8 in); 1,521 mm (59.9 in) (GameBoy, Cabrio)
- Height: 1,621 mm (63.8 in); 1,604–1,665 mm (63.1–65.6 in) (GameBoy); 1,614 mm (63.5 in) (Cabrio)
- Curb weight: 665–700 kg (1,466–1,543 lb); 772–832 kg (1,702–1,834 lb) (GameBoy); 925 kg (2,039 lb) (Cabrio)

The first generation Mini EV can seat four people and comes equipped with standard features, including air conditioning, power windows, a stereo system, and storage compartments. Standard safety features of the Mini EV include anti-lock brakes, tire pressure monitoring sensors, and rear parking sensors. While early models did not include a driver airbag, later models, such as the Mini EV Macaron, have this feature as standard.

Power is produced by an electric motor making a peak 20 kW (27 hp; 27 PS) and 85 N⋅m (63 lb⋅ft) of torque with rear-wheel drive, propelling the car to a stated top speed of 100 km/h (62 mph). The Mini EV is equipped with a 9.2 kWh battery capable of a NEDC range of 120 km (75 mi) or a 13.8kWh battery capable of a NEDC range of 170 km (110 mi). Based on the NEDC driving cycle, the estimated energy consumption of the Mini EV is 8,1 kWh/100 km.

A 26.5 kWh model is due for 2022, with 280 kilometres (170 mi) (CLTC) estimated range, an optional more powerful 30 kW (40 hp; 41 PS) motor, and an improved interior.

In 2020, the Mini EV had a price starting at US$4,162, and topped out at US$5,607 for a fully loaded model, making it China's cheapest electric car. The car has attracted a cult following in China, with owners frequently modifying their vehicles. The popularity has been compared to that of kei cars in Japan. The vehicle has been such a success that it has inspired a number of copycats and competitors, including the Chery QQ Ice Cream, Dongfeng Fengguang Mini EV, Geely Panda Mini EV, and BAW S3.

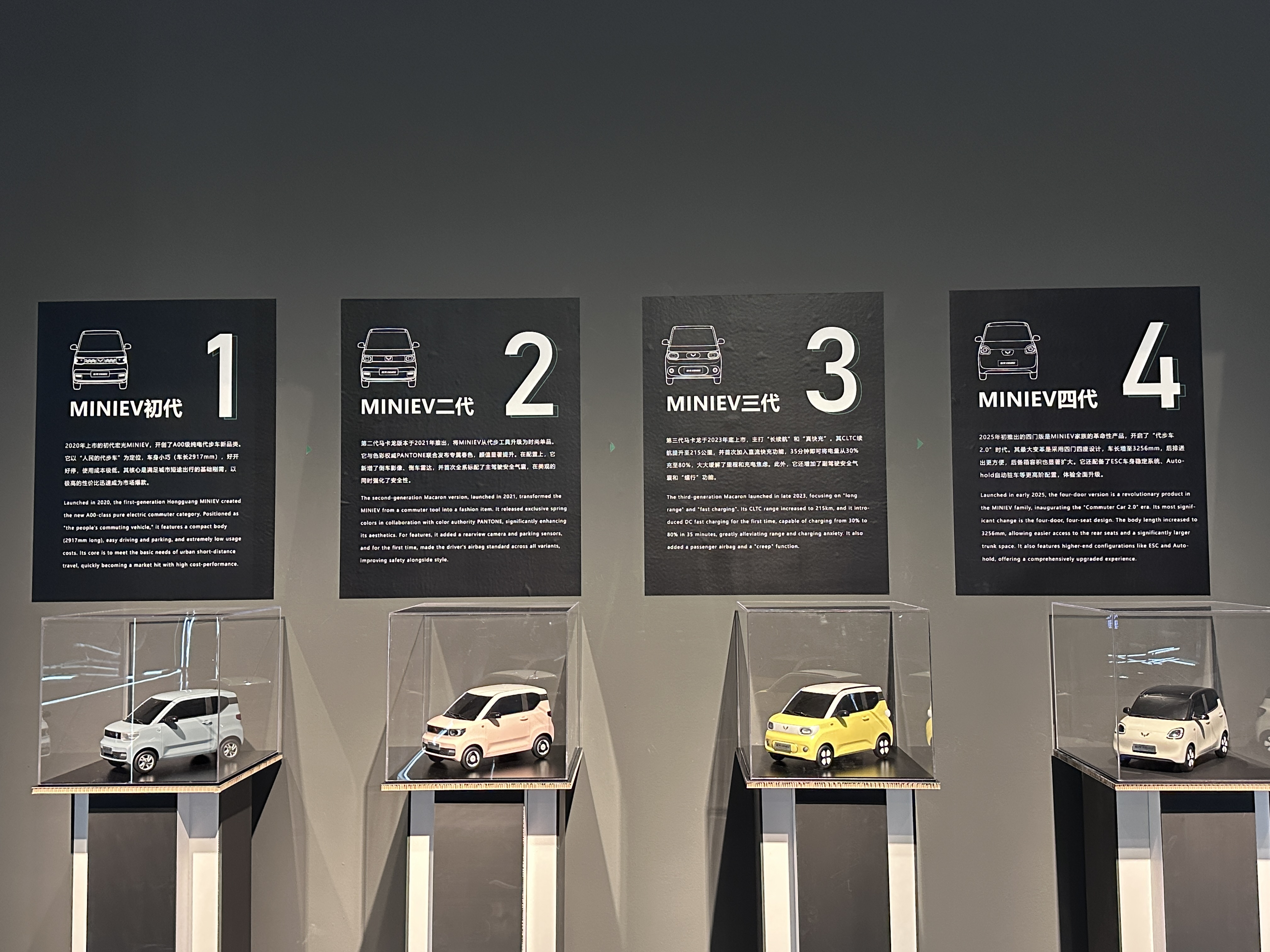
The Wuling Hongguang Mini EV first to fourth generation scale models on display during the “Revealing Future” Shanghai Art & Design Exhibition at the China Art Museum.

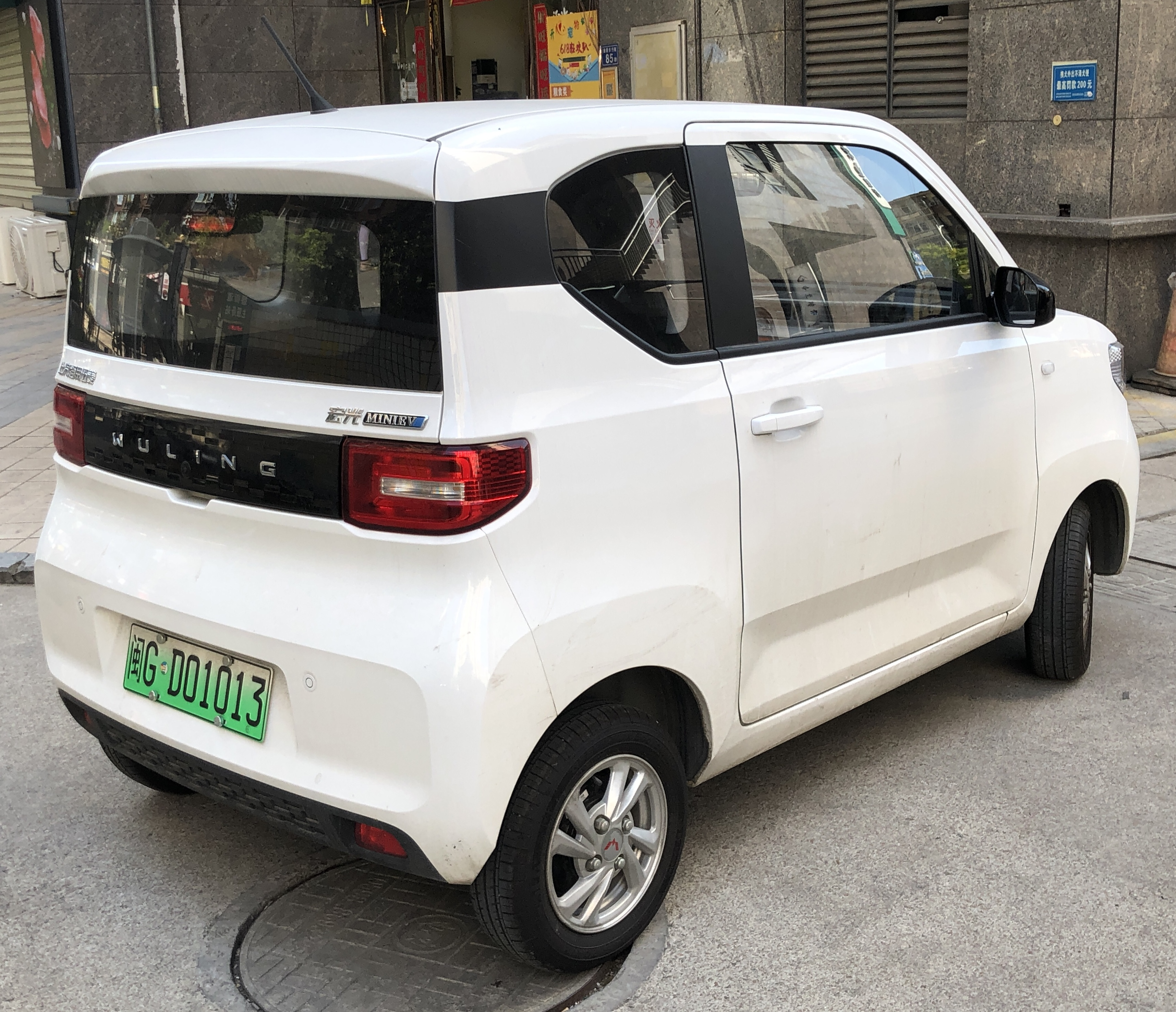
Rear view

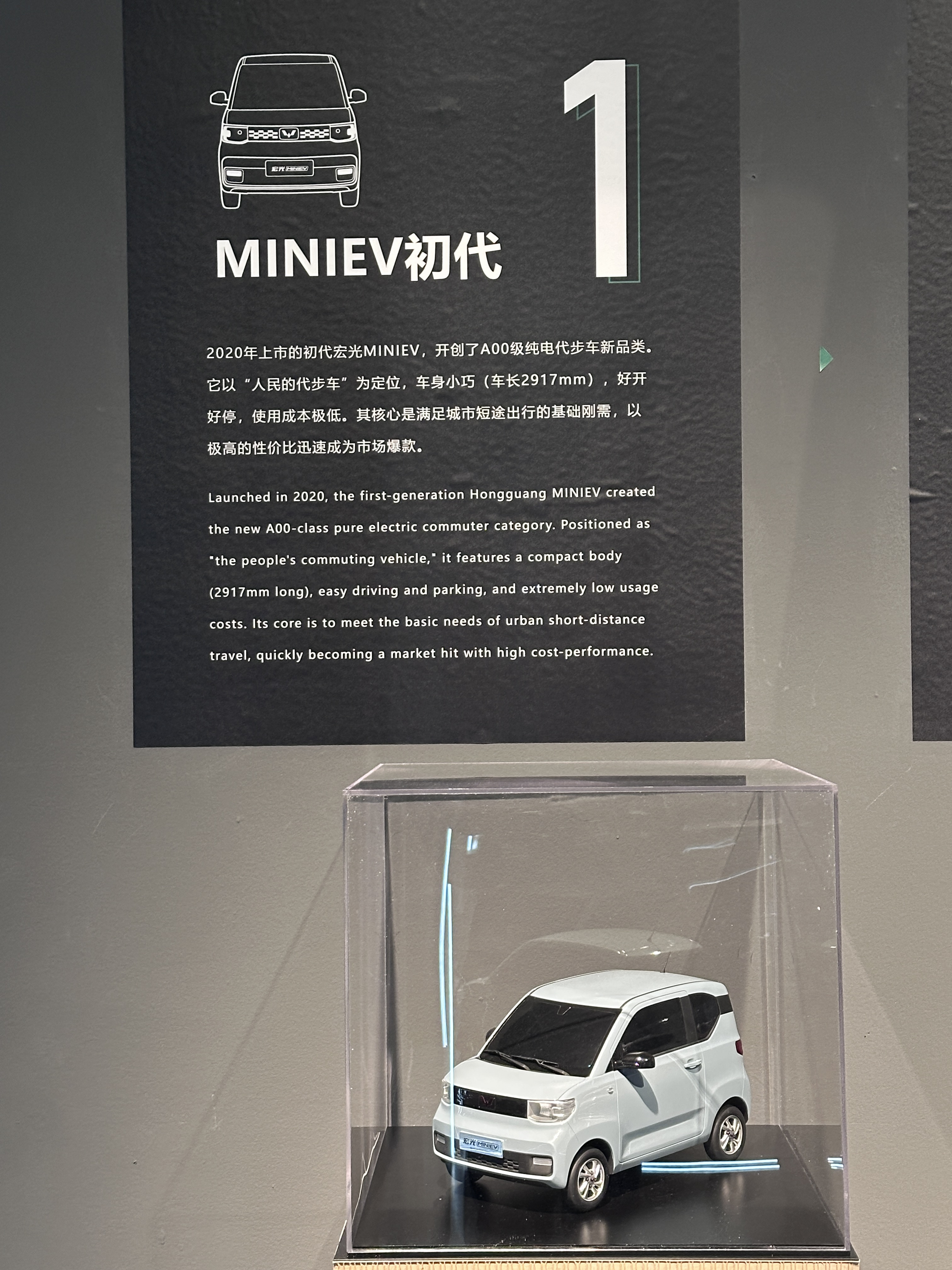
Diecast model on display

=== Freze Nikrob ===
In 2021 the Lithuanian company Nikrob UAB announced a rebadged version of the Mini EV called the FreZe Nikrob with knock-down assembly in Vilnius, Lithuania.

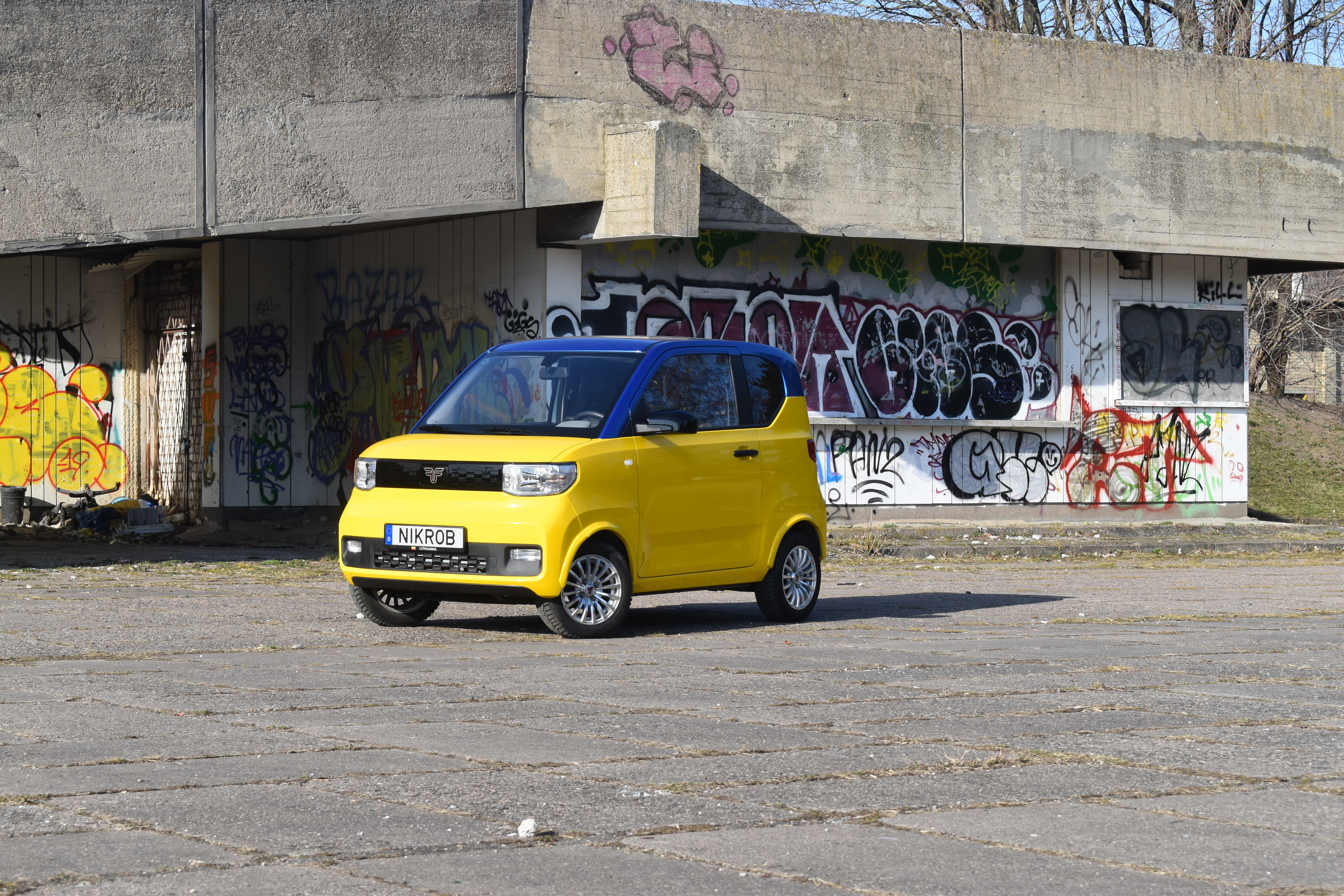
Freze Nikrob

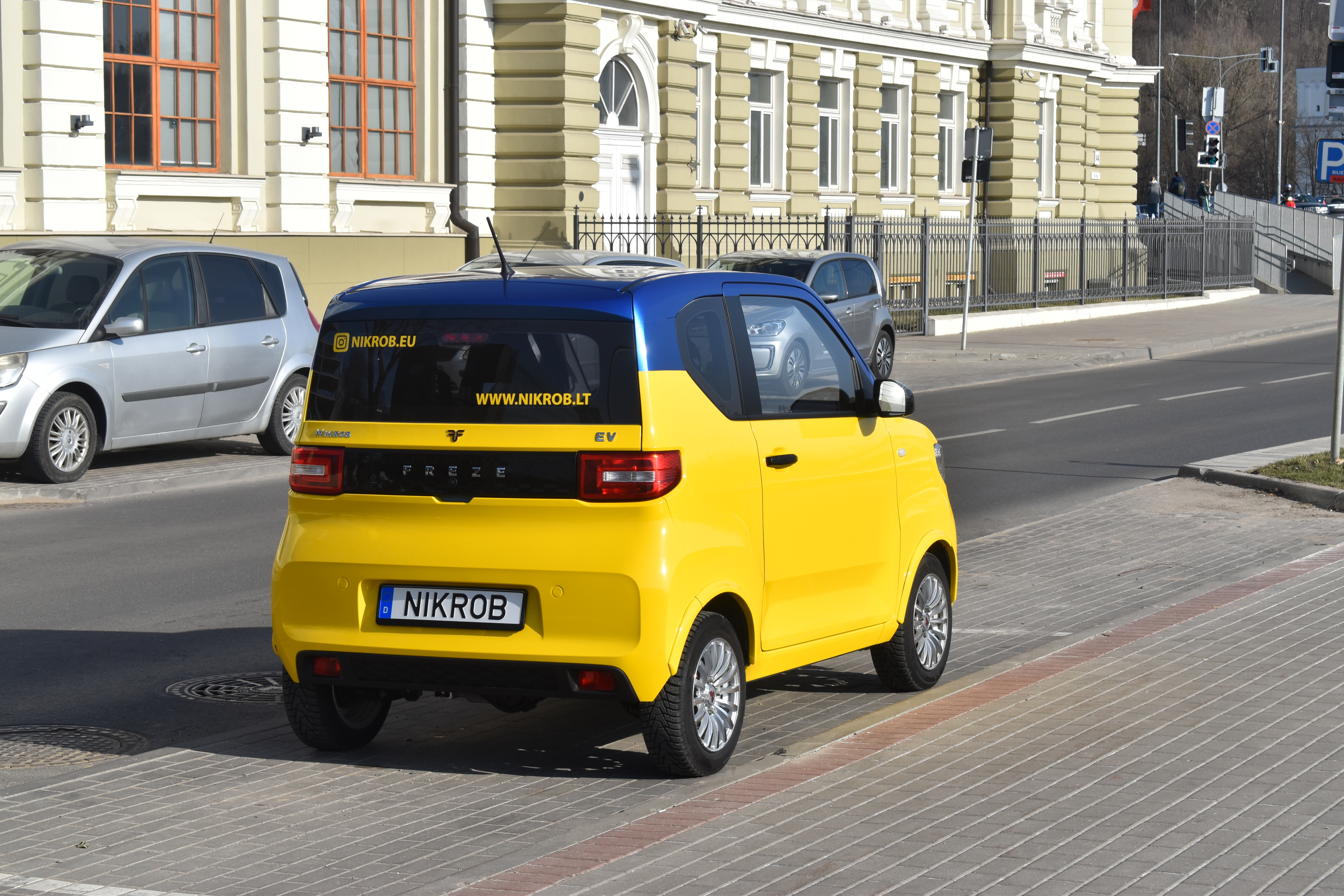
Rear view

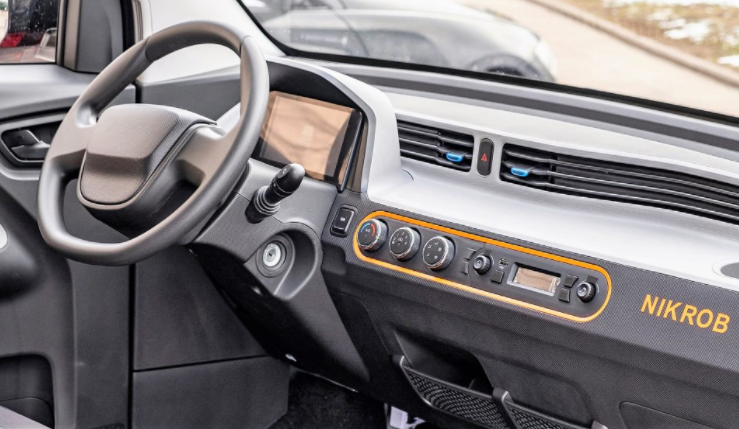
Interior

=== Rainwoll RW10 ===
In 2023, the Turkish company called Rainwoll announced a rebadged version of Wuling Hongguang Mini EV called the Rainwoll RW10. It is sold in 3 trim levels; Basic, Comfort, and Macaron.

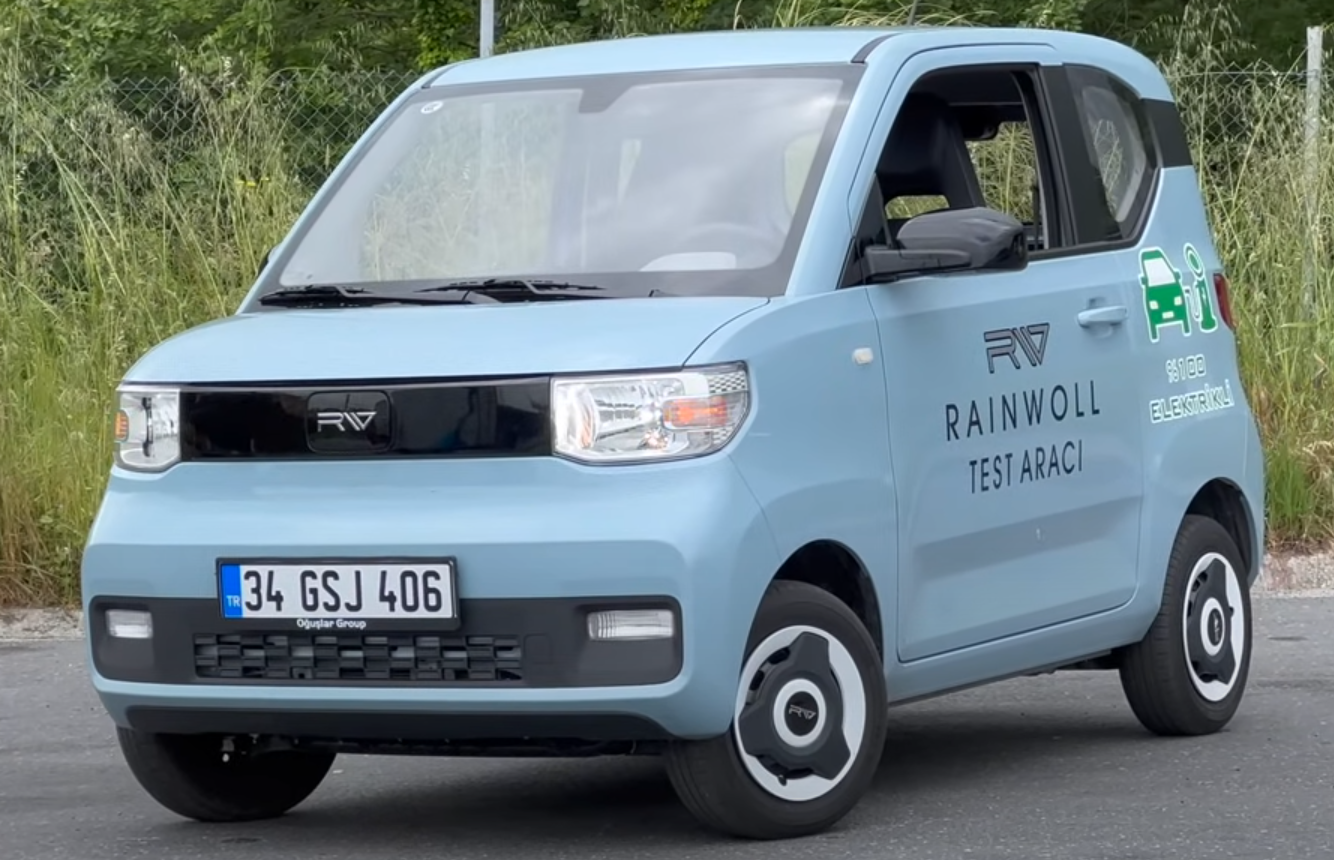
Rainwoll RW10

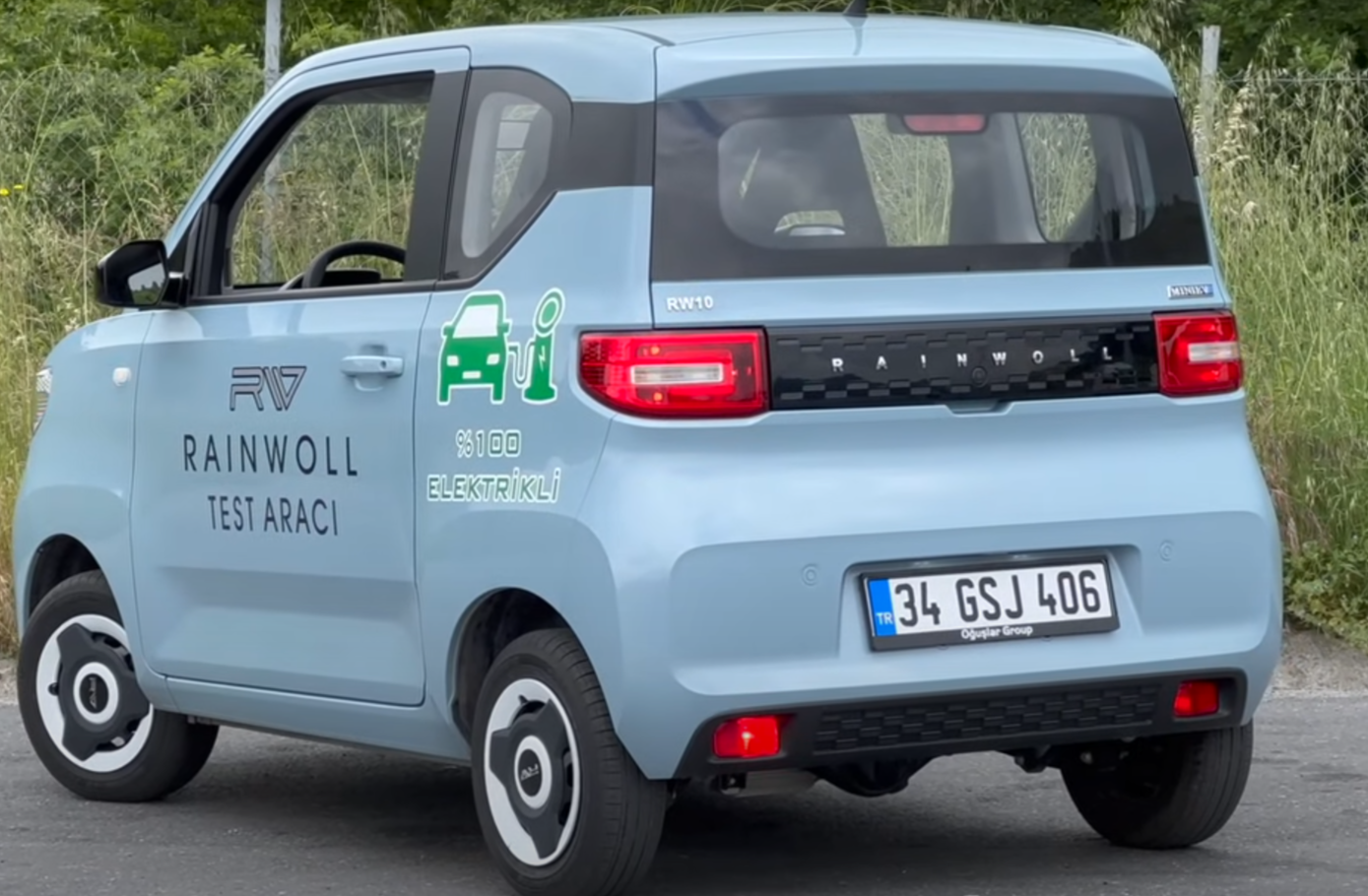
Rear view

=== Mini EV Macaron (2021) ===
The SAIC-GM-Wuling launched a variant of the Hongguang Mini EV called as the Mini EV Macaron in April 2021. Officially marketed as the second generation model, the Macaron is more premium featuring reverse cameras and radars with an additional driver airbag. Styling wise, it is available with three exclusive paint colors and more standard features. The Macaron is sold as a more premium and personalized variant that features redesigned darkened LED headlights, two-tone alloy wheels and exclusive body colors. The colors are Avocado Green, Lemon Yellow and White Peach Pink, which are the results of the collaboration of Wuling and Pantone Universe. The Macaron also receives more safety equipment compared to the previous base trim level, including low-speed pedestrian warning, a reversing camera with rear parking sonar and a driver-side airbag.

The Macaron is equipped with a small electric motor that generates a more powerful 20 kW (27 hp; 27 PS) and 85 N⋅m (63 lb⋅ft) of torque compared to the previously launched base trim while range remains unchanged.

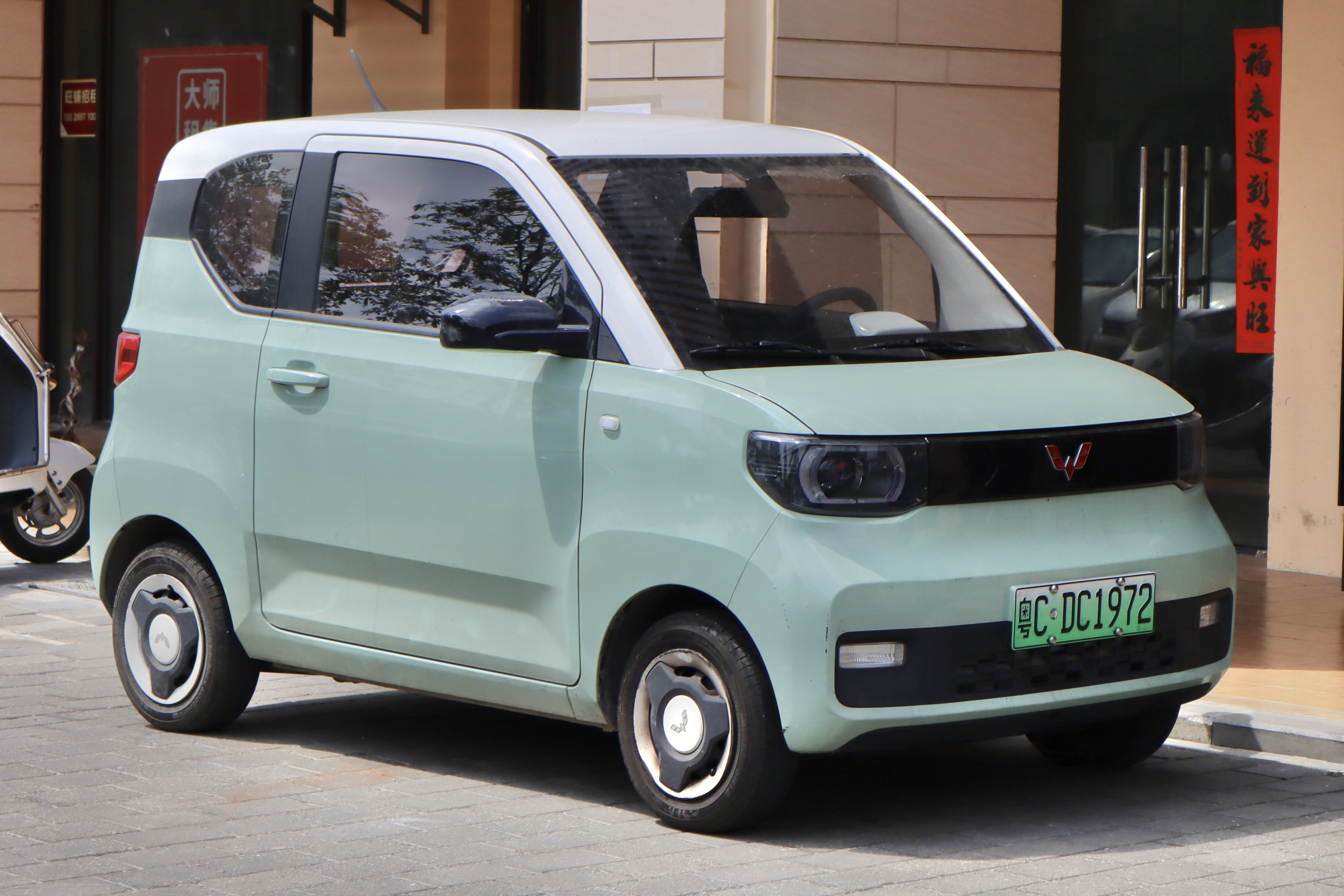
Wuling Hongguang Mini EV Macaron

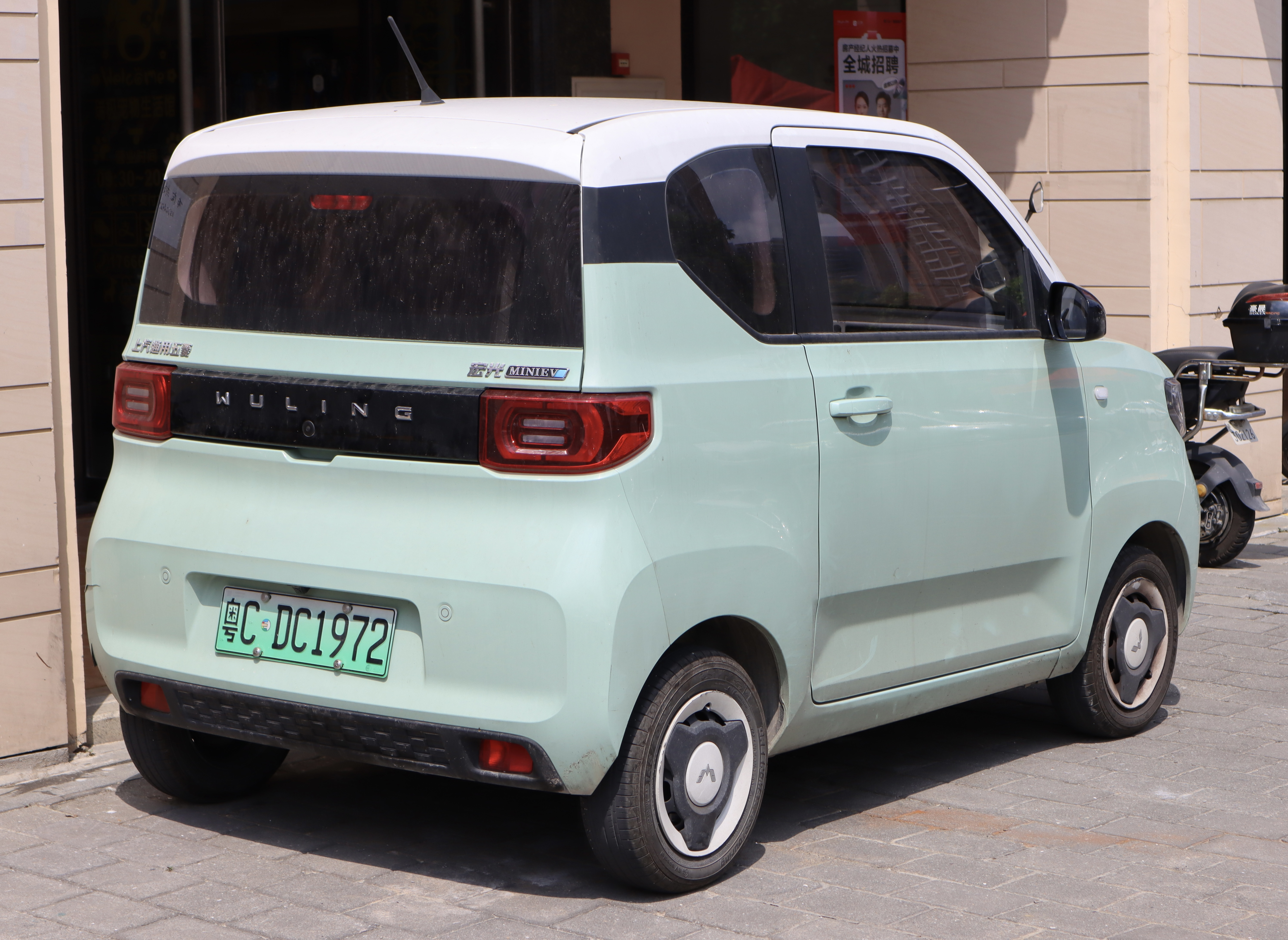
Rear view

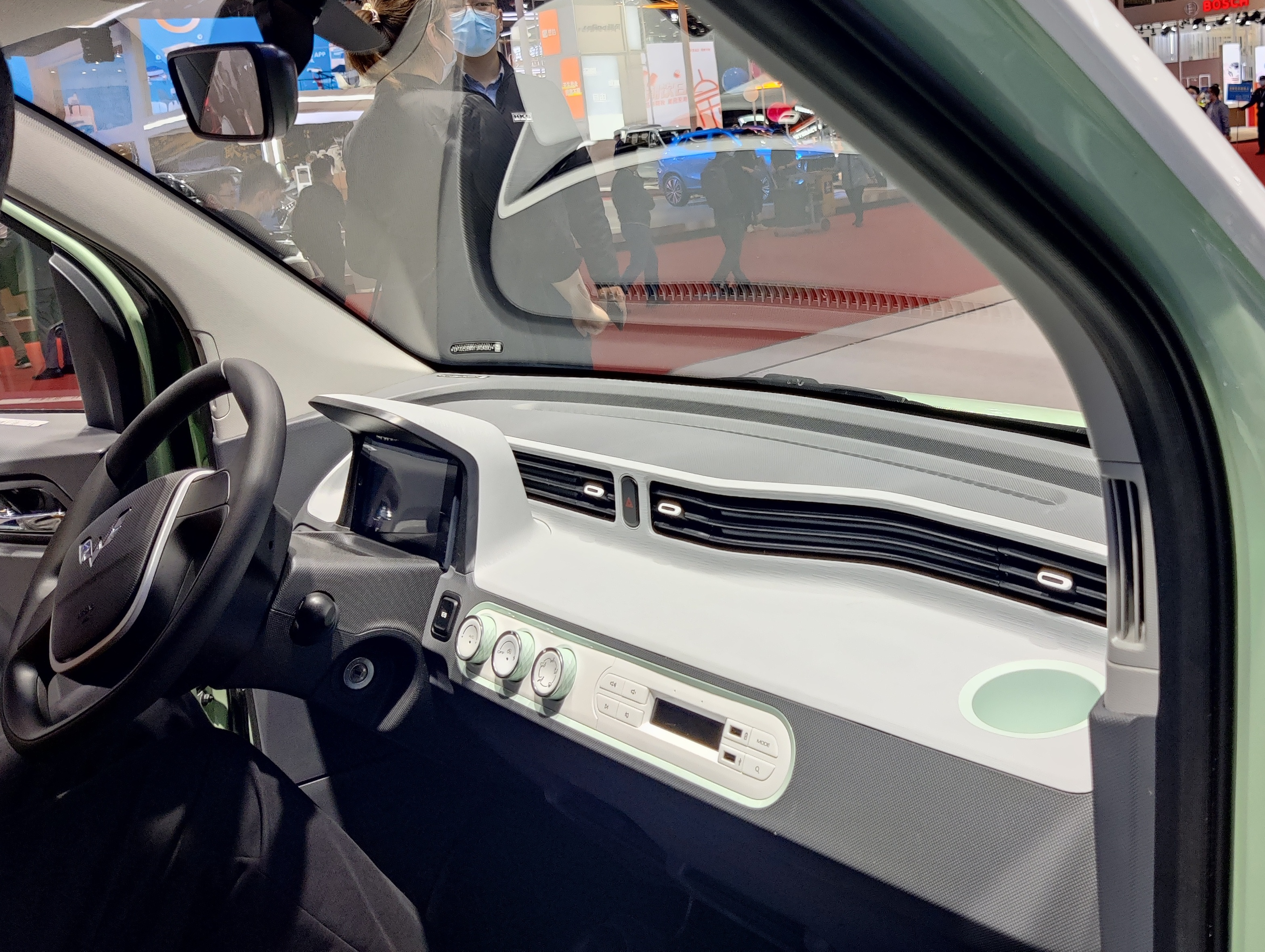
Interior

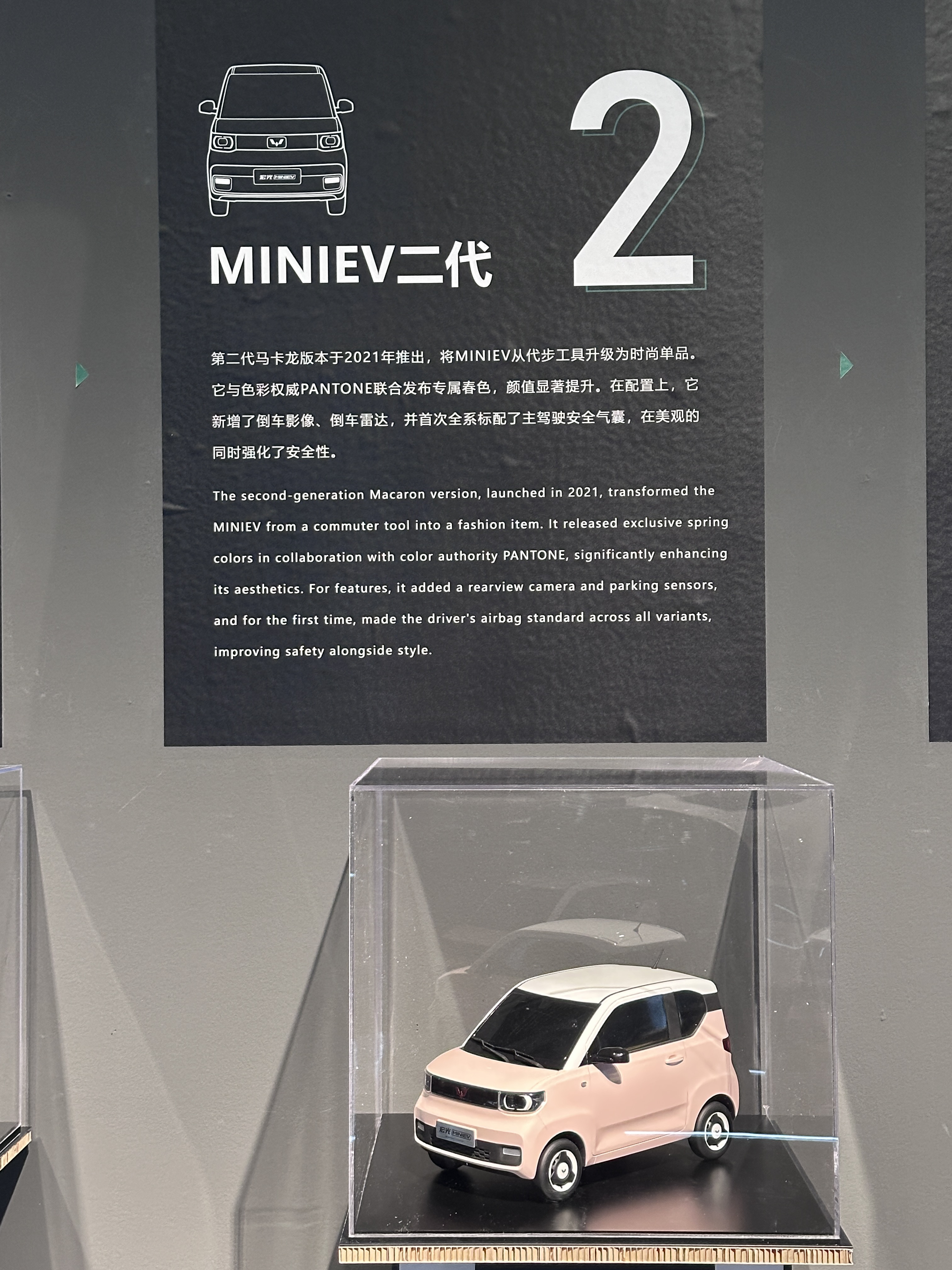
Diecast model on display stating the model as the second generation Hongguang Mini EV

=== Mini EV GameBoy Edition (2022) ===
The Mini EV GameBoy Edition was introduced in March 2022 and sold alongside the previous models. It is marketed as the third-generation model. Its exterior has been completely restyled with larger dimensions, while the power remains to be unchanged and carried over from the standard Mini EV producing 27 hp (20 kW; 27 PS) and 85 N⋅m (63 lb⋅ft) or 40 hp (30 kW; 41 PS) and 110 N⋅m (81 lb⋅ft), mated to a 9.2, 13.9, or 25.5 kWh battery.

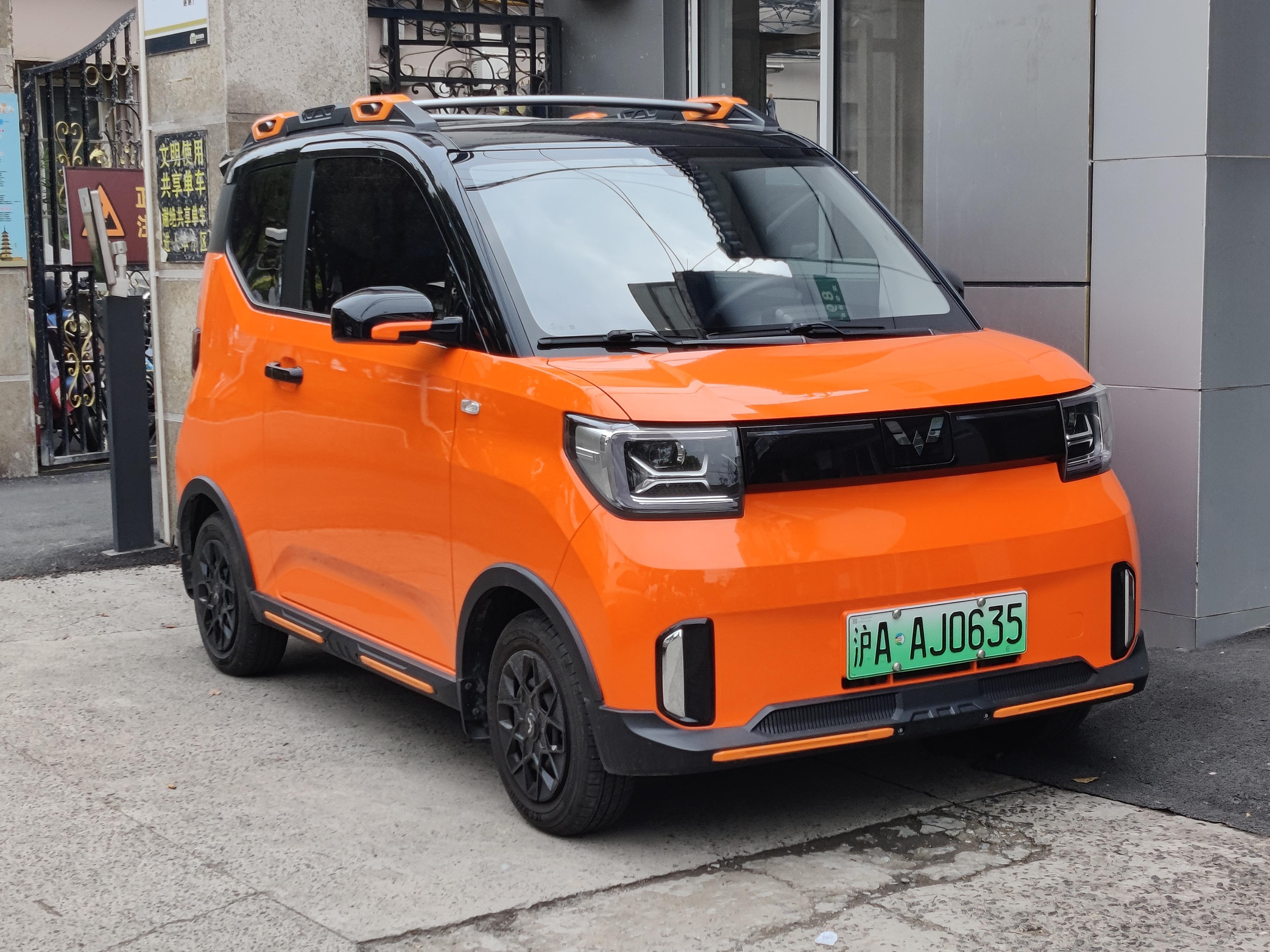
Wuling Hongguang Mini EV GameBoy Edition

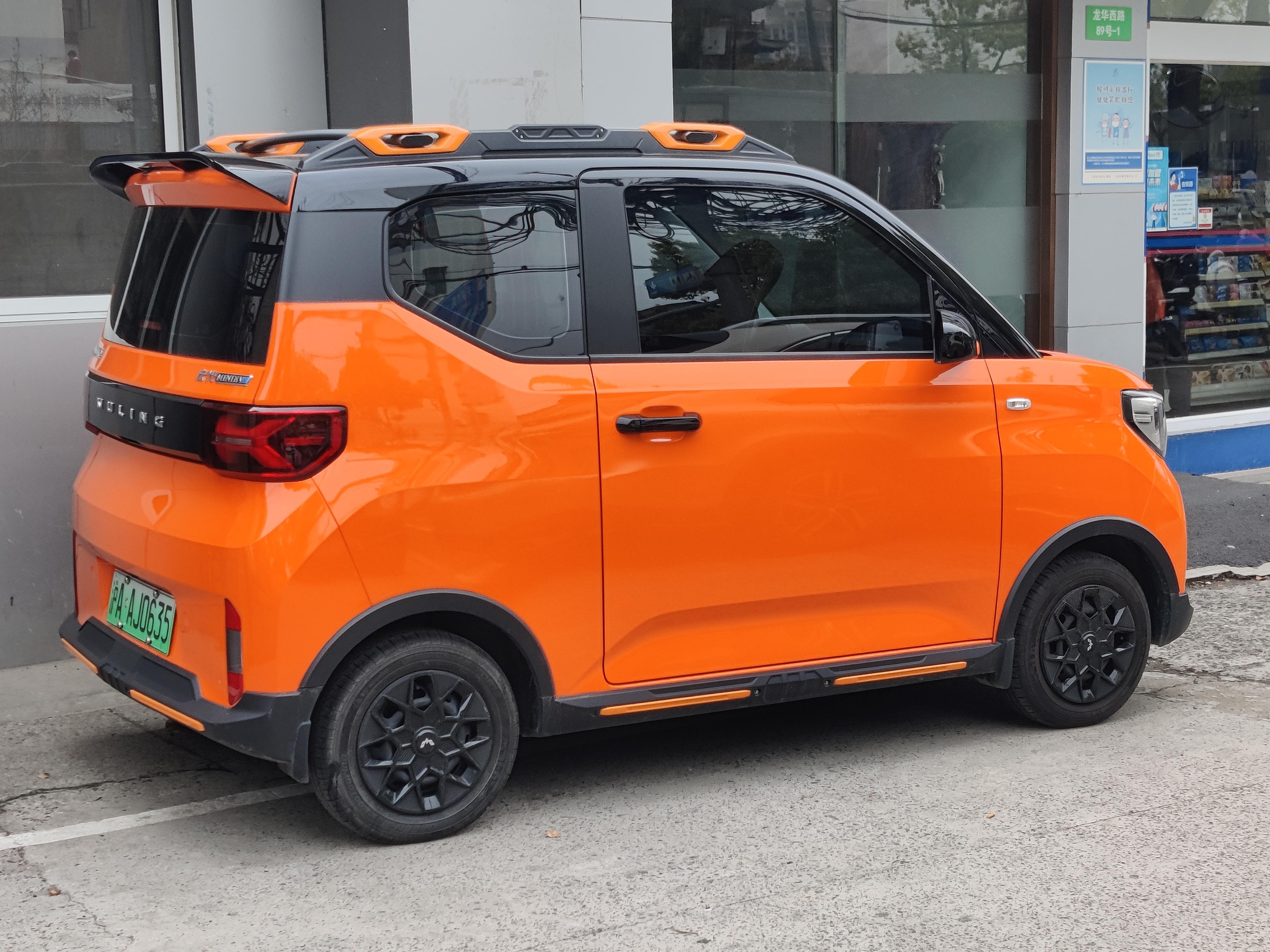
Rear view

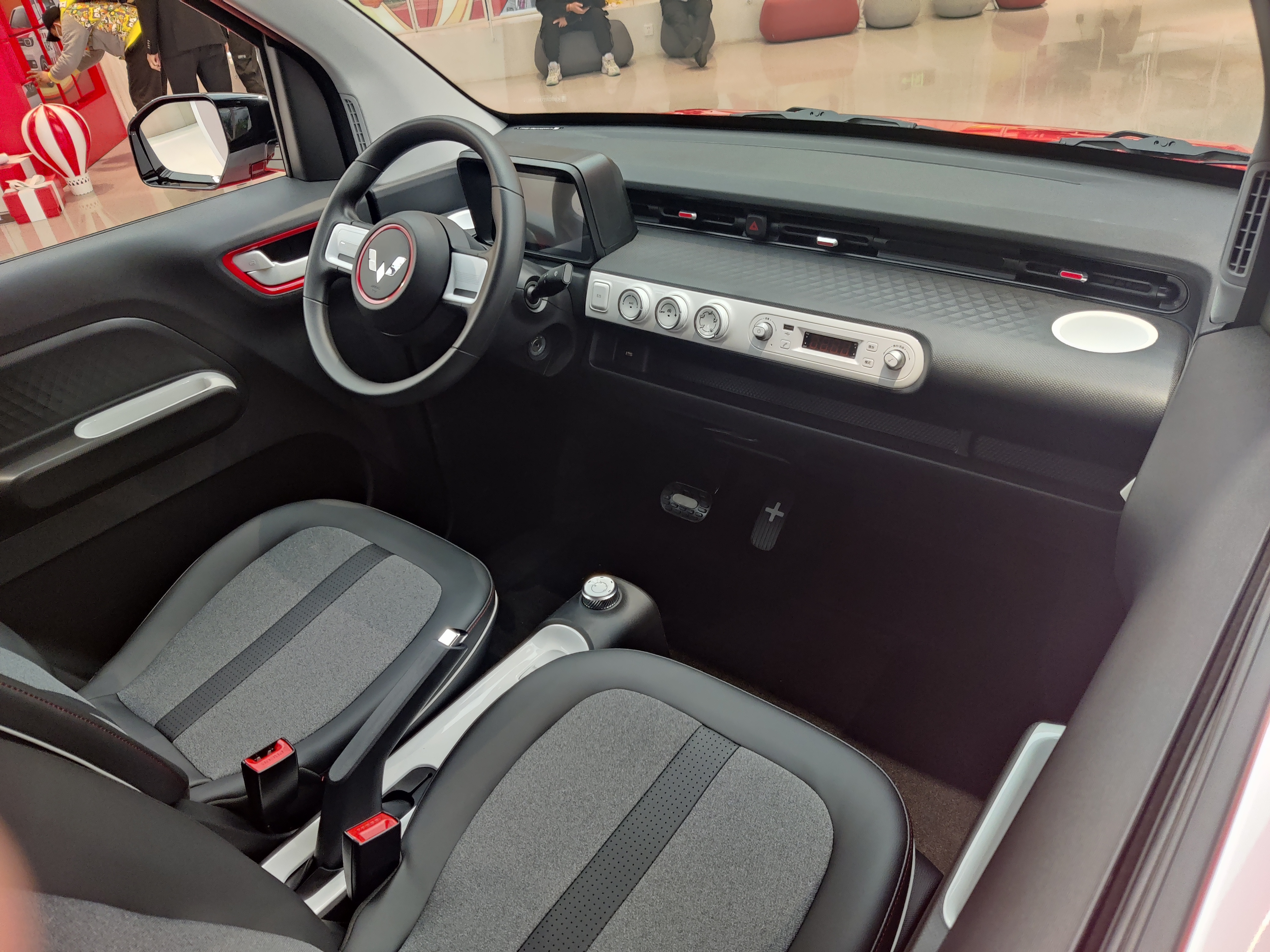
Interior

=== Mini EV Cabrio ===
A convertible concept version of the Mini EV called as the Mini EV Cabrio with a folding soft top was unveiled during the 2021 Shanghai Auto Show, with the vehicle body design based on the Mini EV Macaron. The production version vehicle body design is based on Mini EV GameBoy Edition and was launched in September 2022.

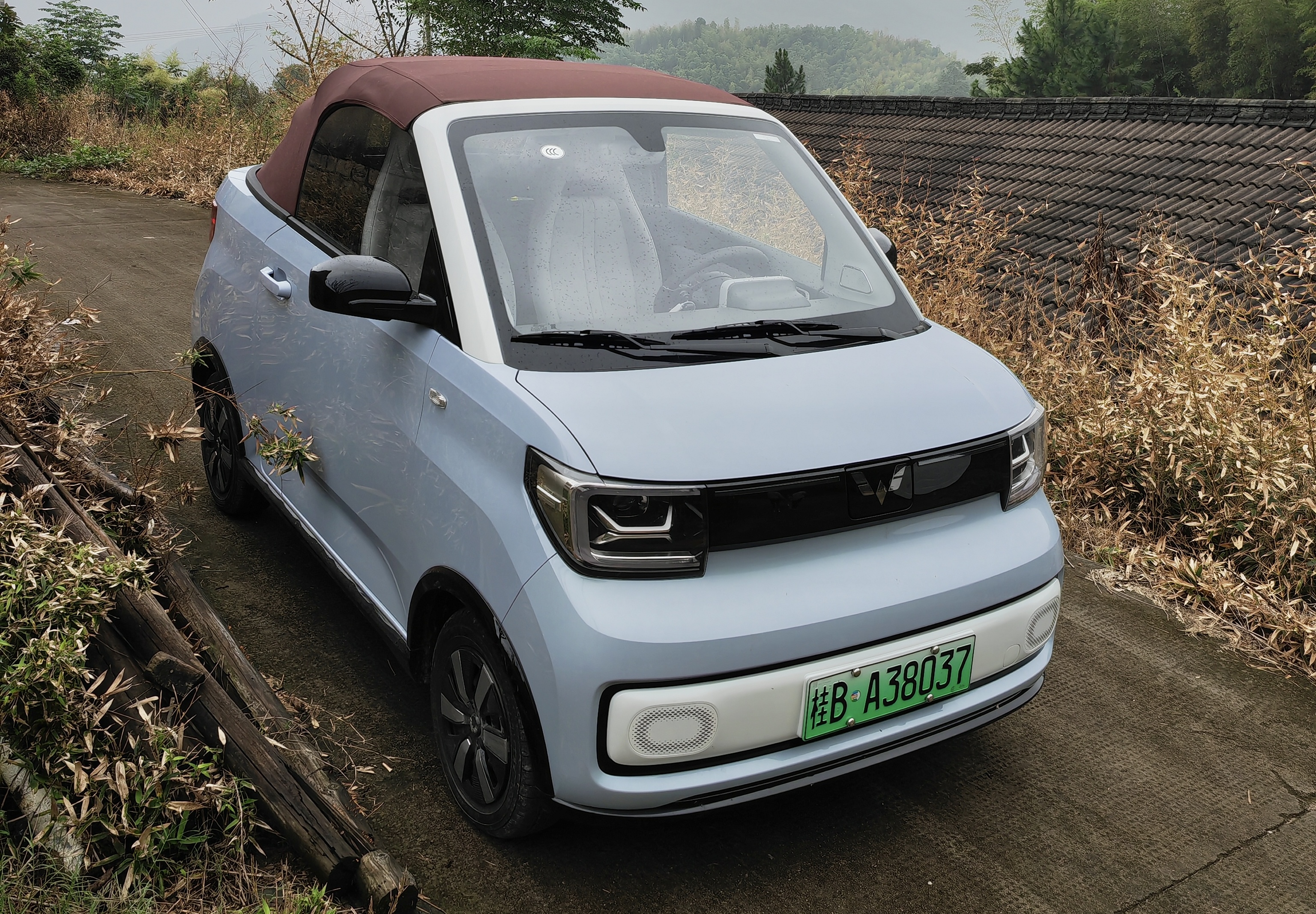
Wuling Hongguang Mini EV Cabrio

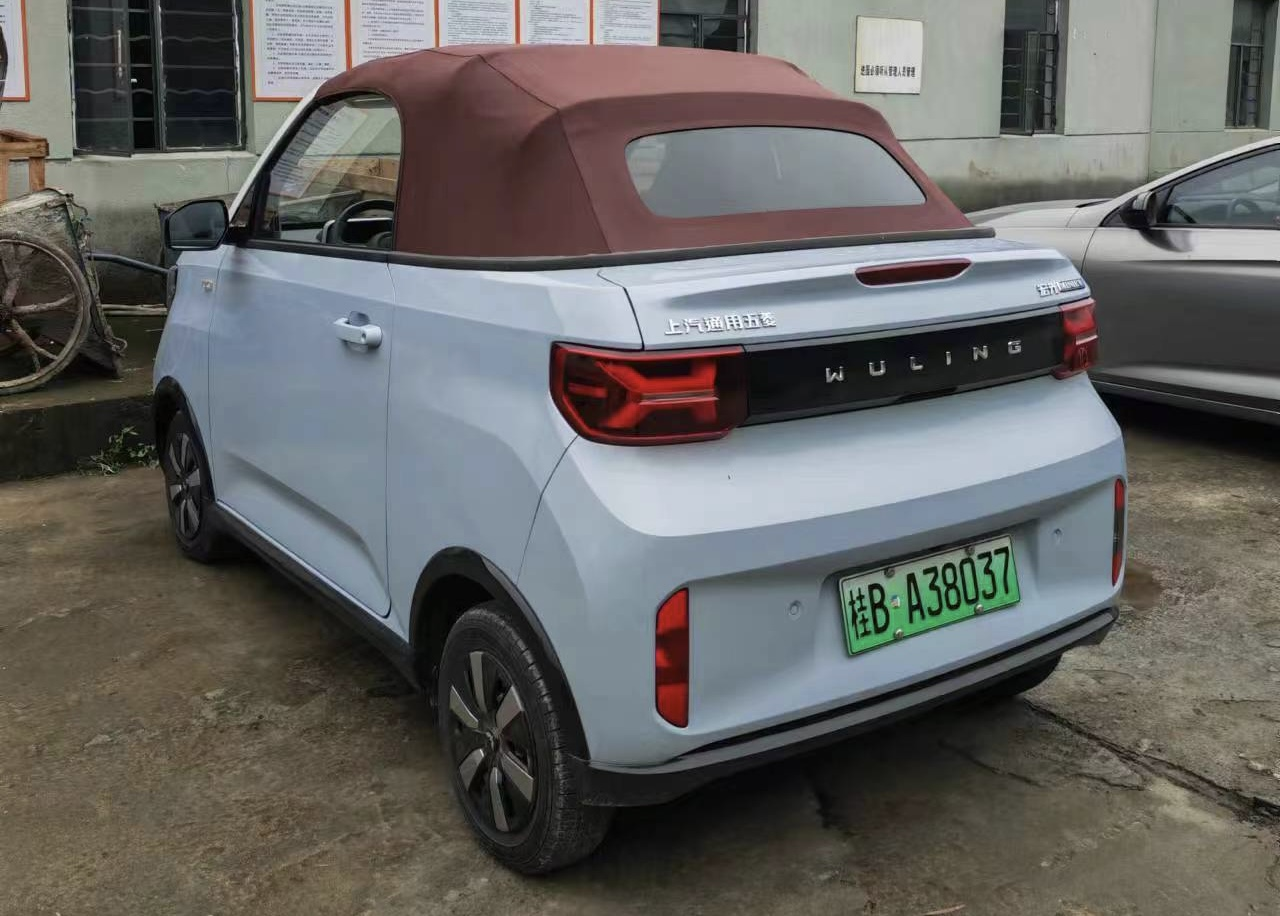
Rear view

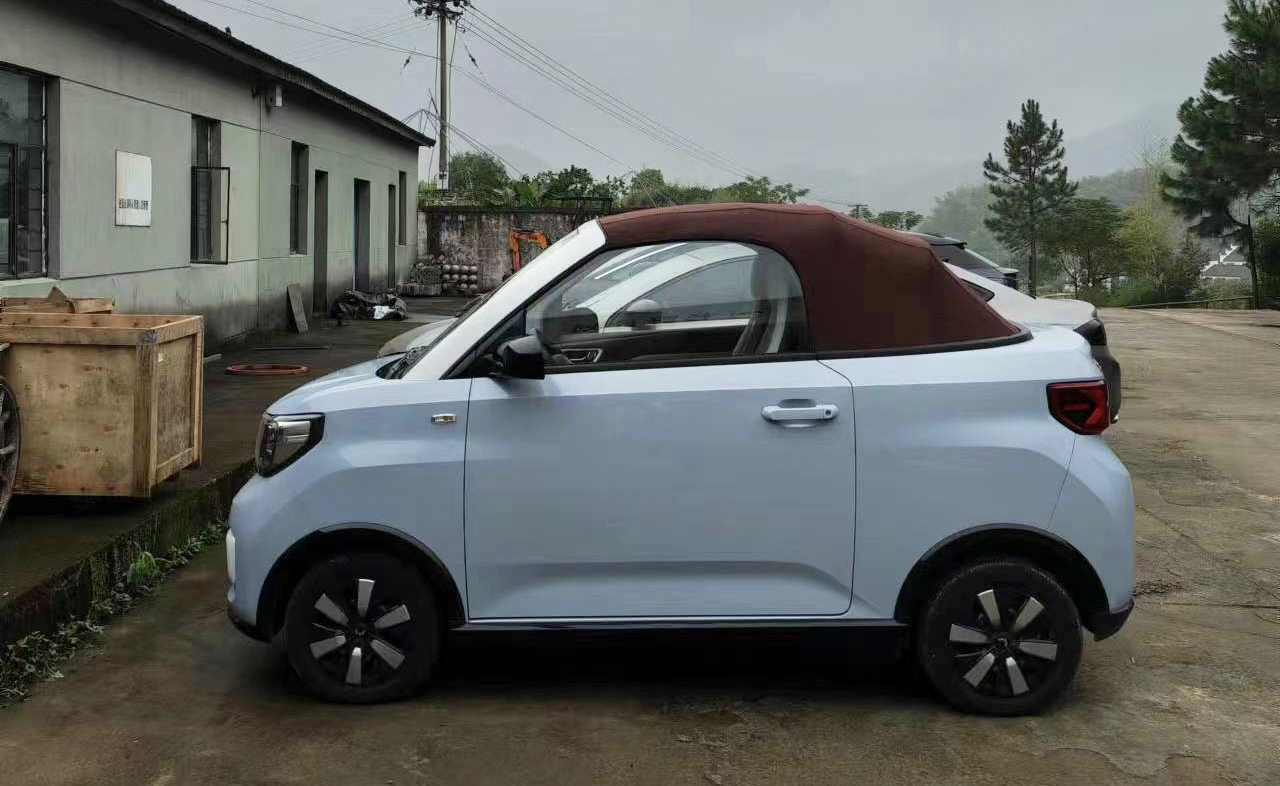
With closed roof

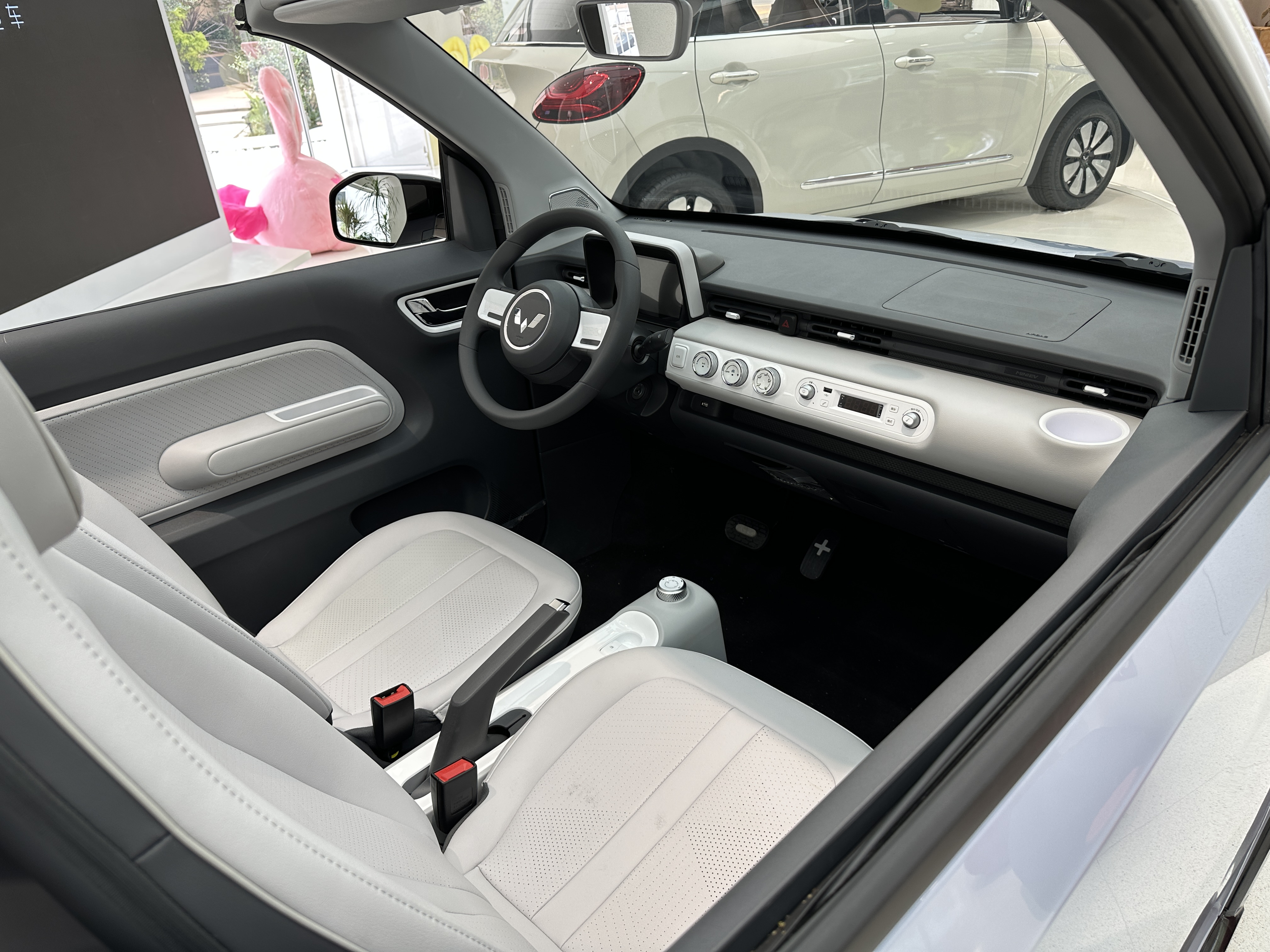
Interior

=== Macaron (2023) ===
Based on the third generation model, a new Macaron edition was launched by the end of 2023. The updated model features an additional passenger airbag and an extended CTLC range of 215 km, and fast charging enabling a 30% to 80% SoC charging time of 35 minutes.

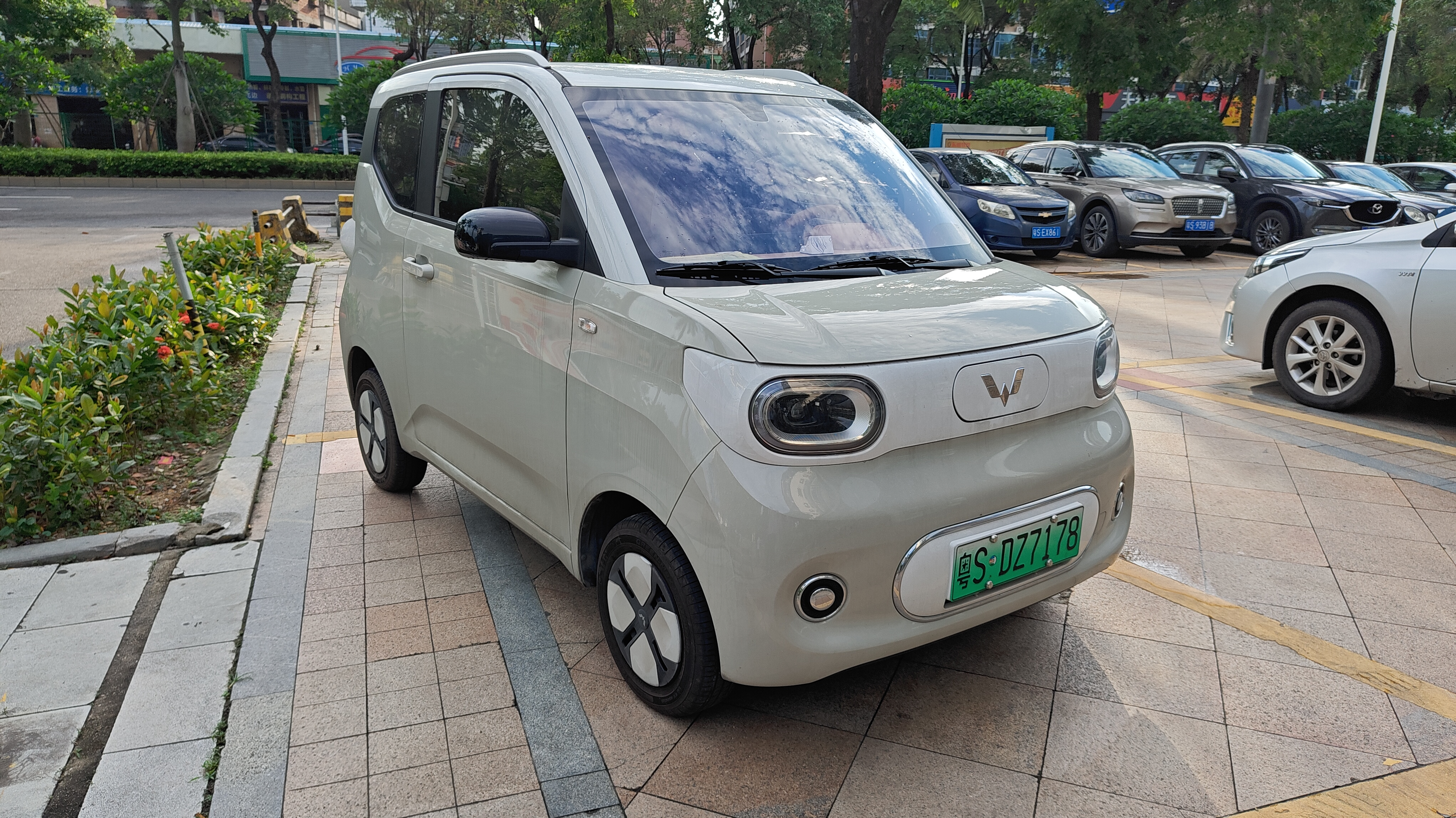
Wuling Macaron

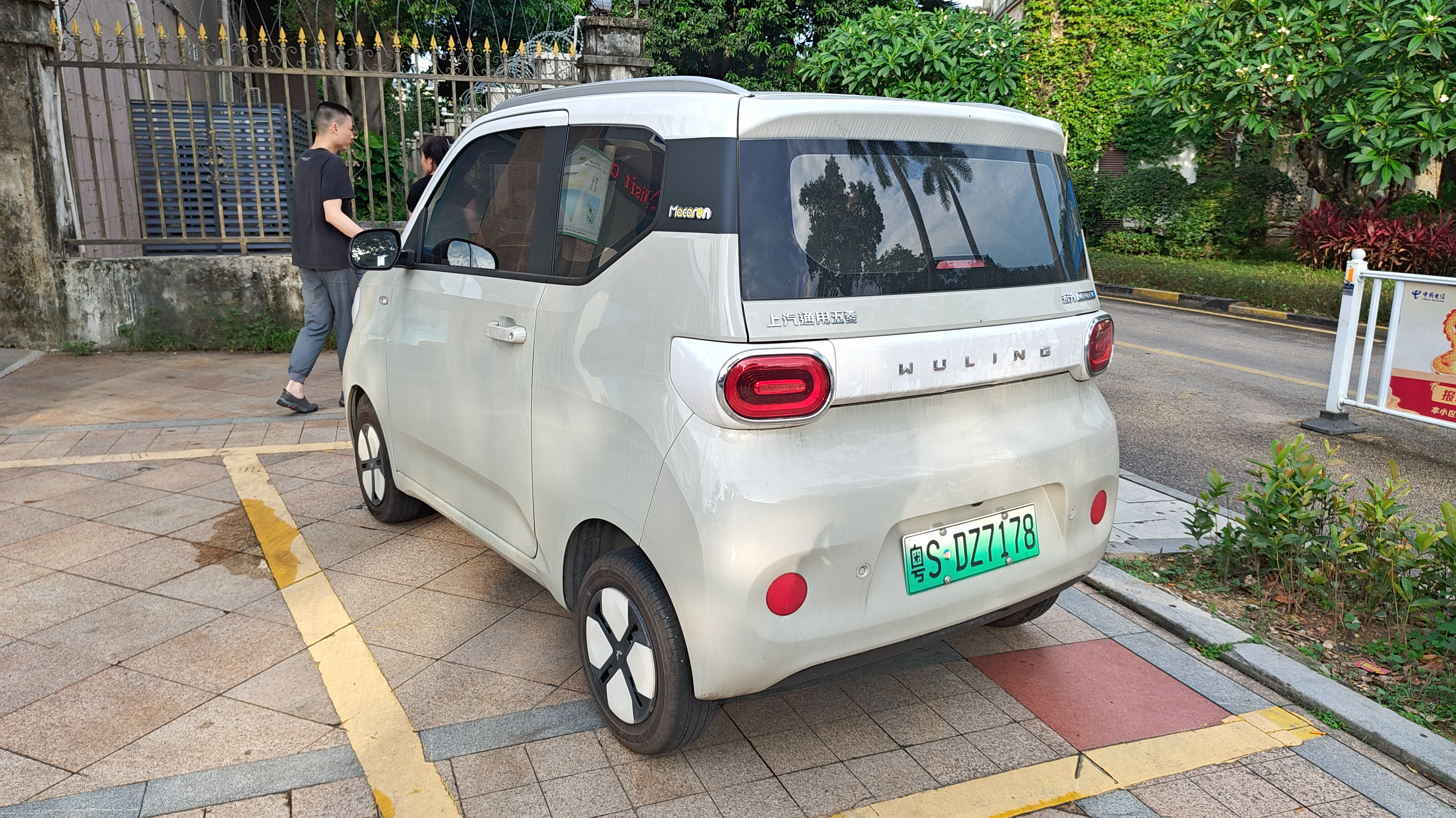
Rear view

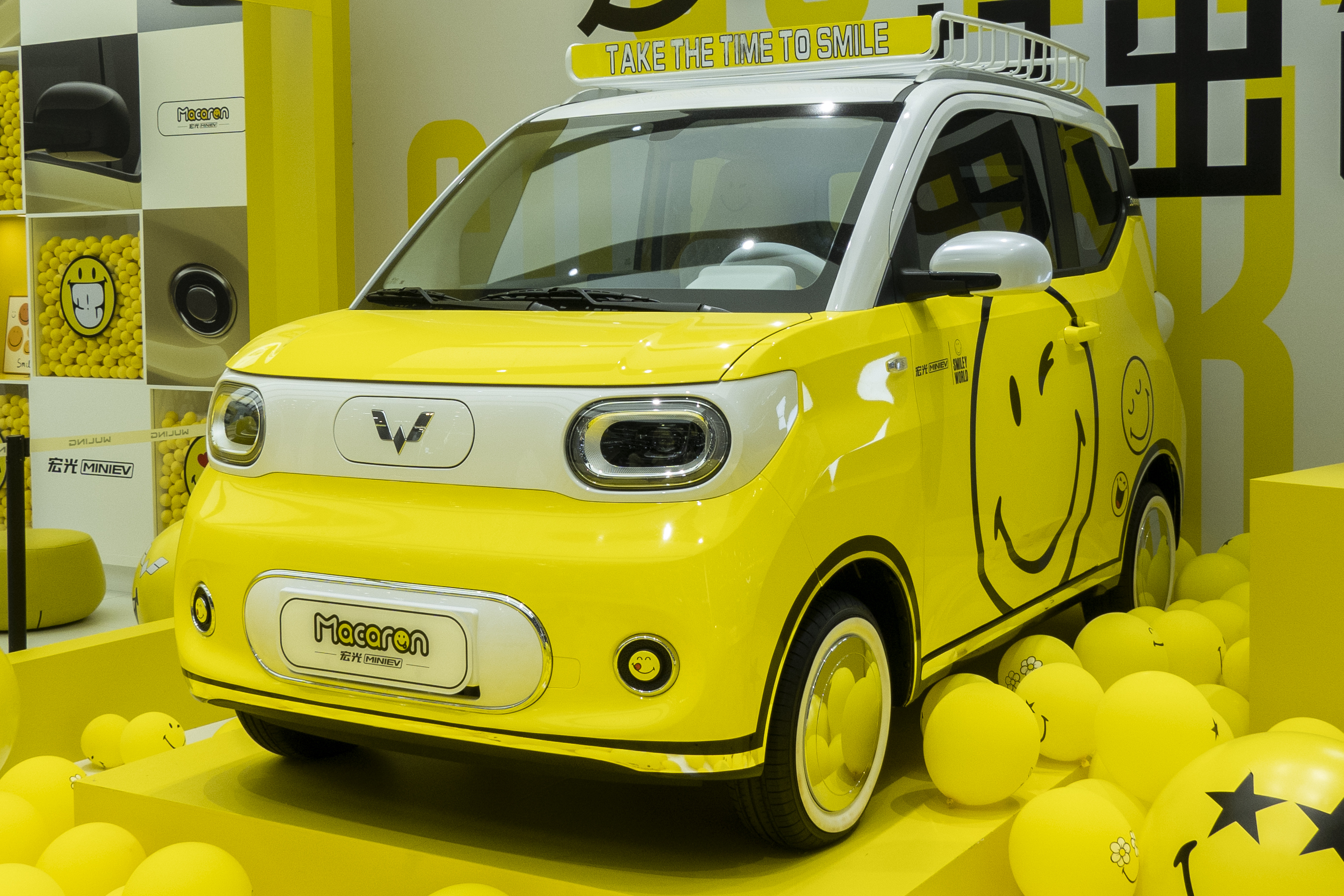
The new generation Macaron at 2023 Auto Guangzhou.

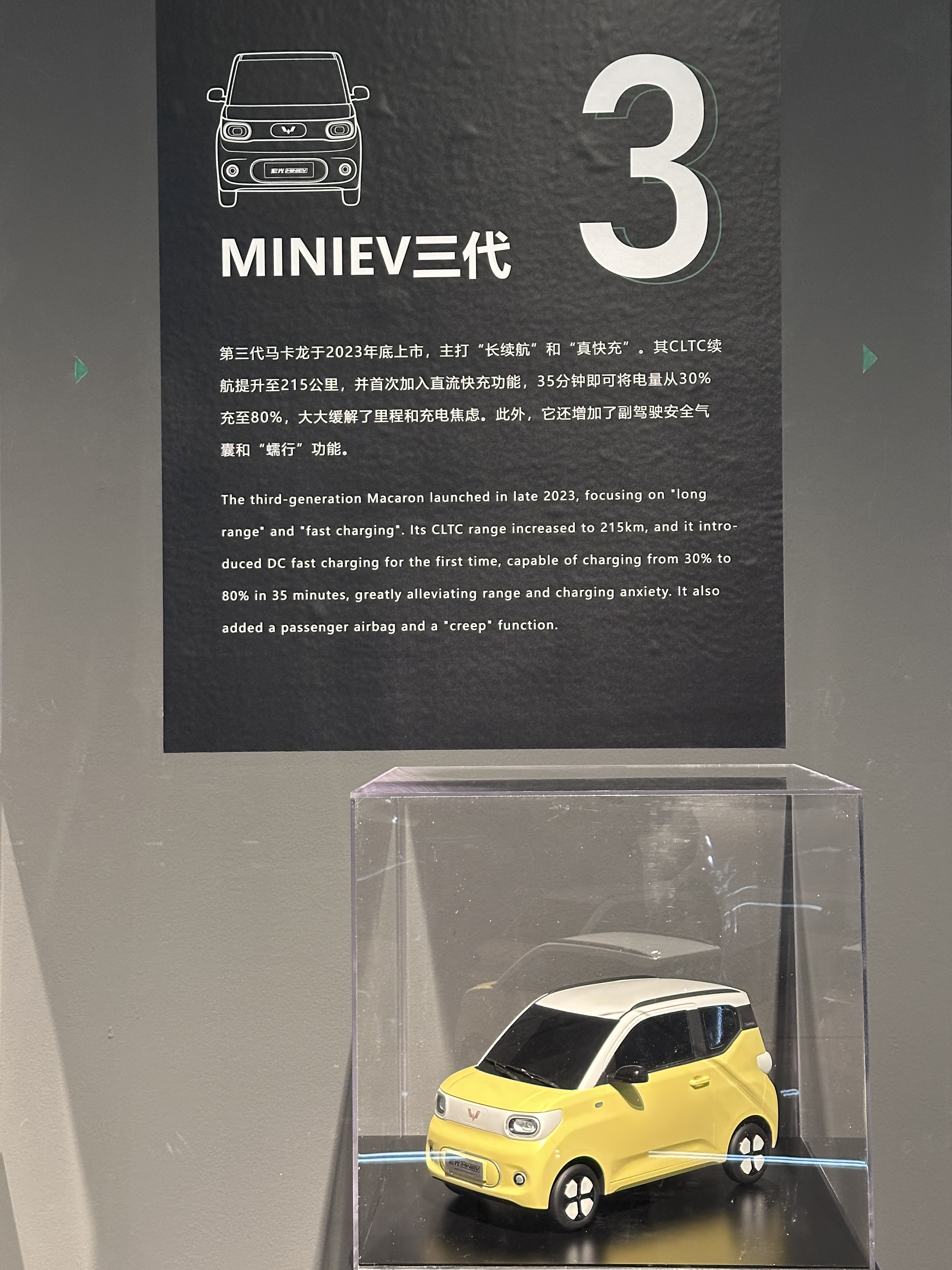
Diecast model on display as a representative of the third generation Hongguang Mini EV

== Second generation (2024) ==
Second generation
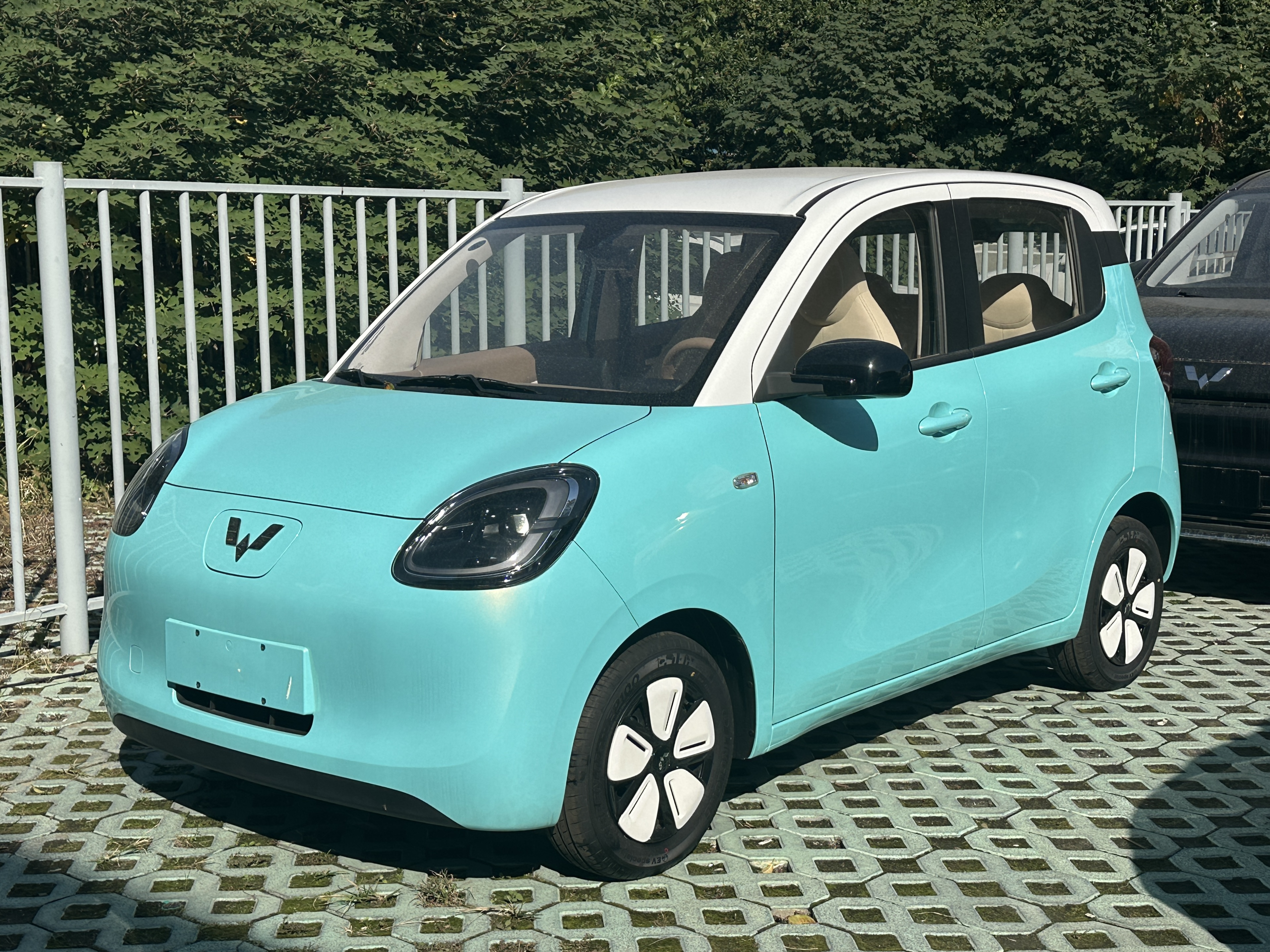

Overview
- Model code: E110C
- Also called: Wuling Aira EV (Indonesia); Wuling Mini EV (Thailand); Wuling Macaron (Vietnam)
- Production: December 2024 – present (China); July 2026 – present (Indonesia)
- Assembly: China: Qingdao, Shandong; Liuzhou, Guangxi (SGMW); Indonesia: Cikarang, West Java (SGMW Motor Indonesia)

Body and chassis
- Layout: Rear-motor, rear-wheel-drive
- Platform: Tianyu S Architecture

Powertrain
- Electric motor: 1x1XM AC permanent magnet synchronous motor
- Power output: 15–30 kW (20–40 hp; 20–41 PS)
- Battery: 9.2 kWh LFP; 13.8 kWh LFP; 16.2 kWh LFP; 25.1 kWh LFP; 26 kWh LFP
- Electric range: 120–280 km (75–174 mi)

Dimensions
- Wheelbase: 1,965–2,190 mm (77.4–86.2 in)
- Length: 3,043–3,268 mm (119.8–128.7 in)
- Width: 1,493–1,520 mm (58.8–59.8 in)
- Height: 1,575–1,614 mm (62.0–63.5 in)

The second generation Mini EV, marketed as the fourth generation model, was unveiled in December 2024 and launched on 22 February 2025.

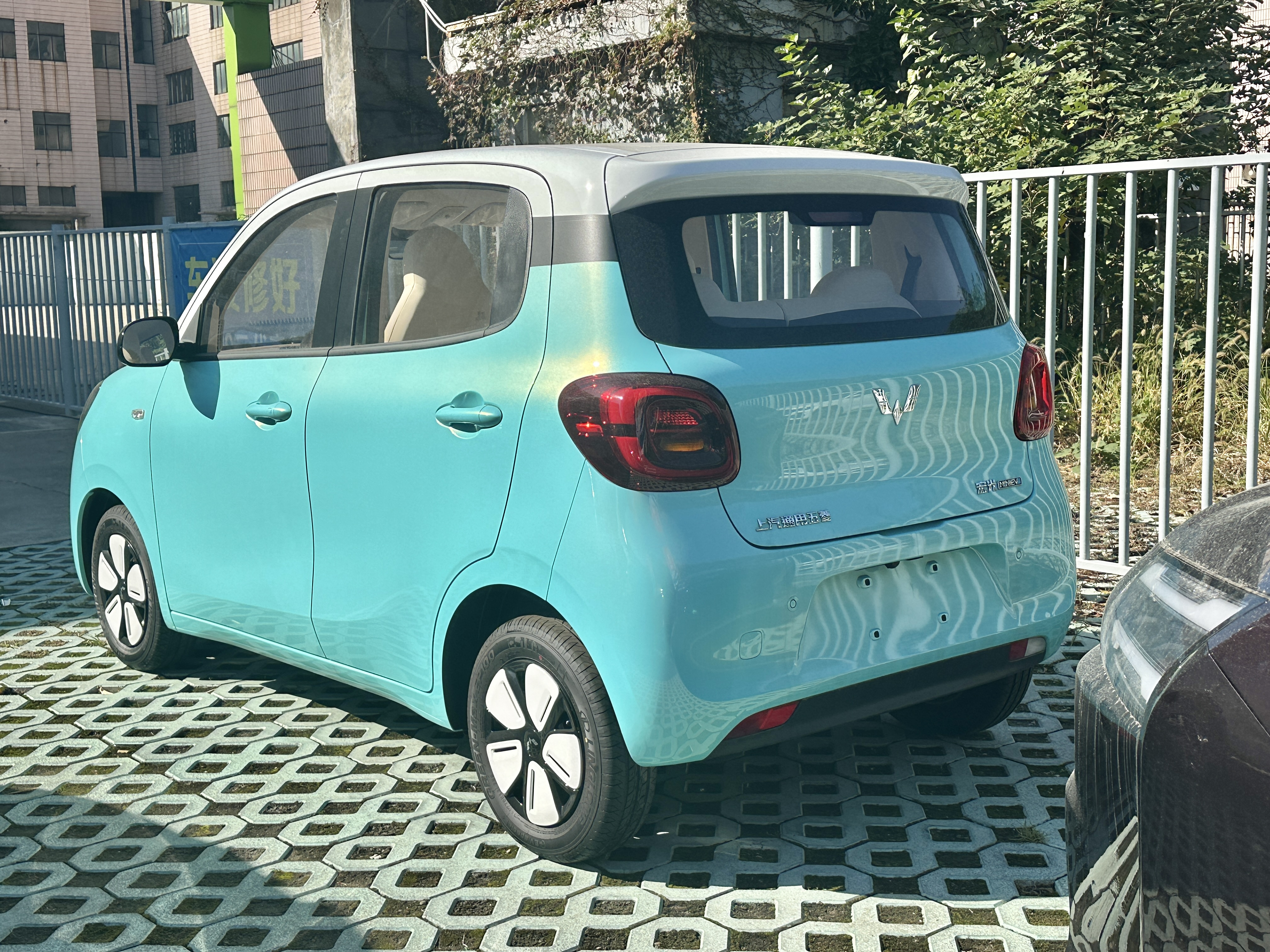
Rear view

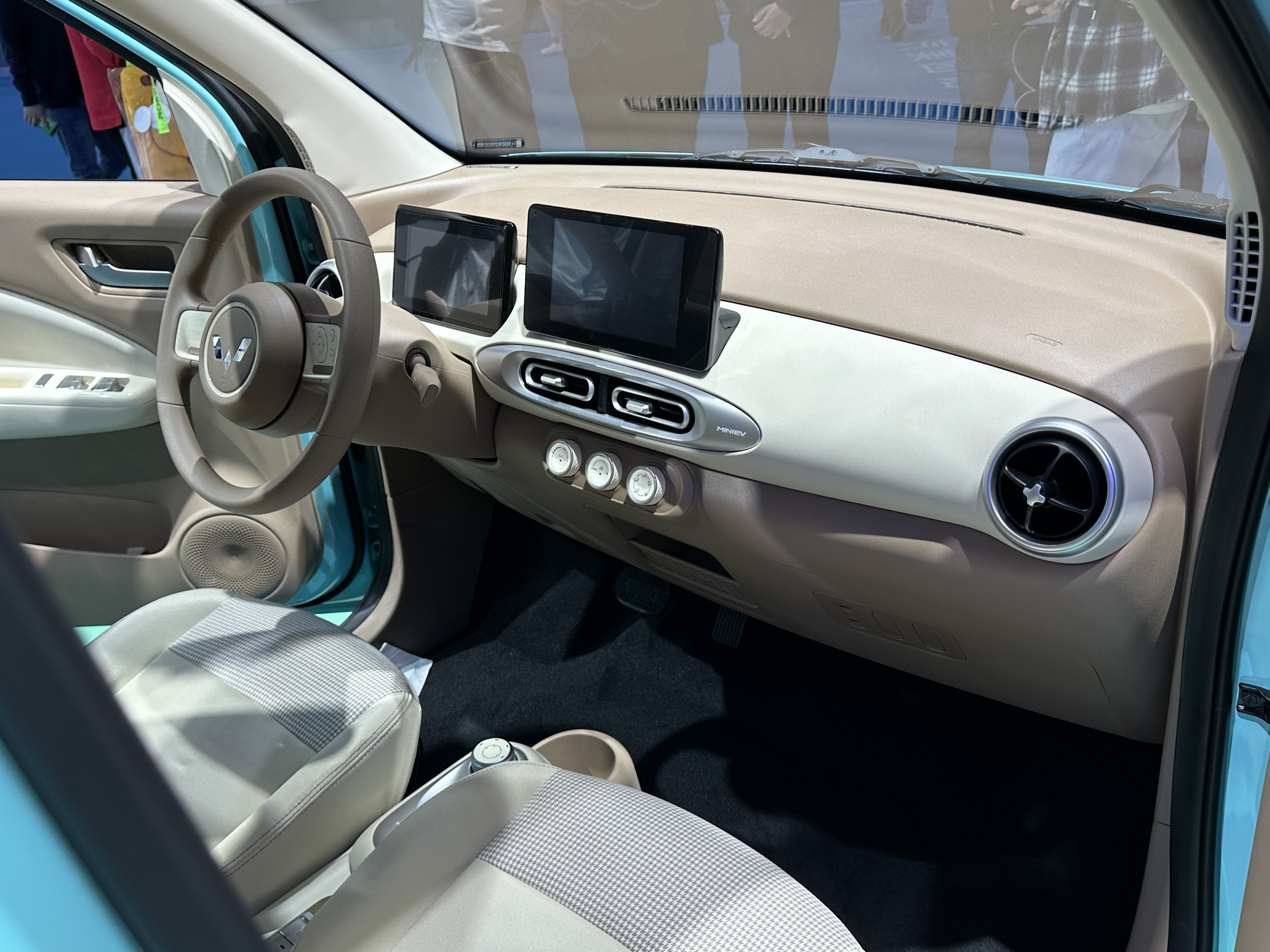
Interior

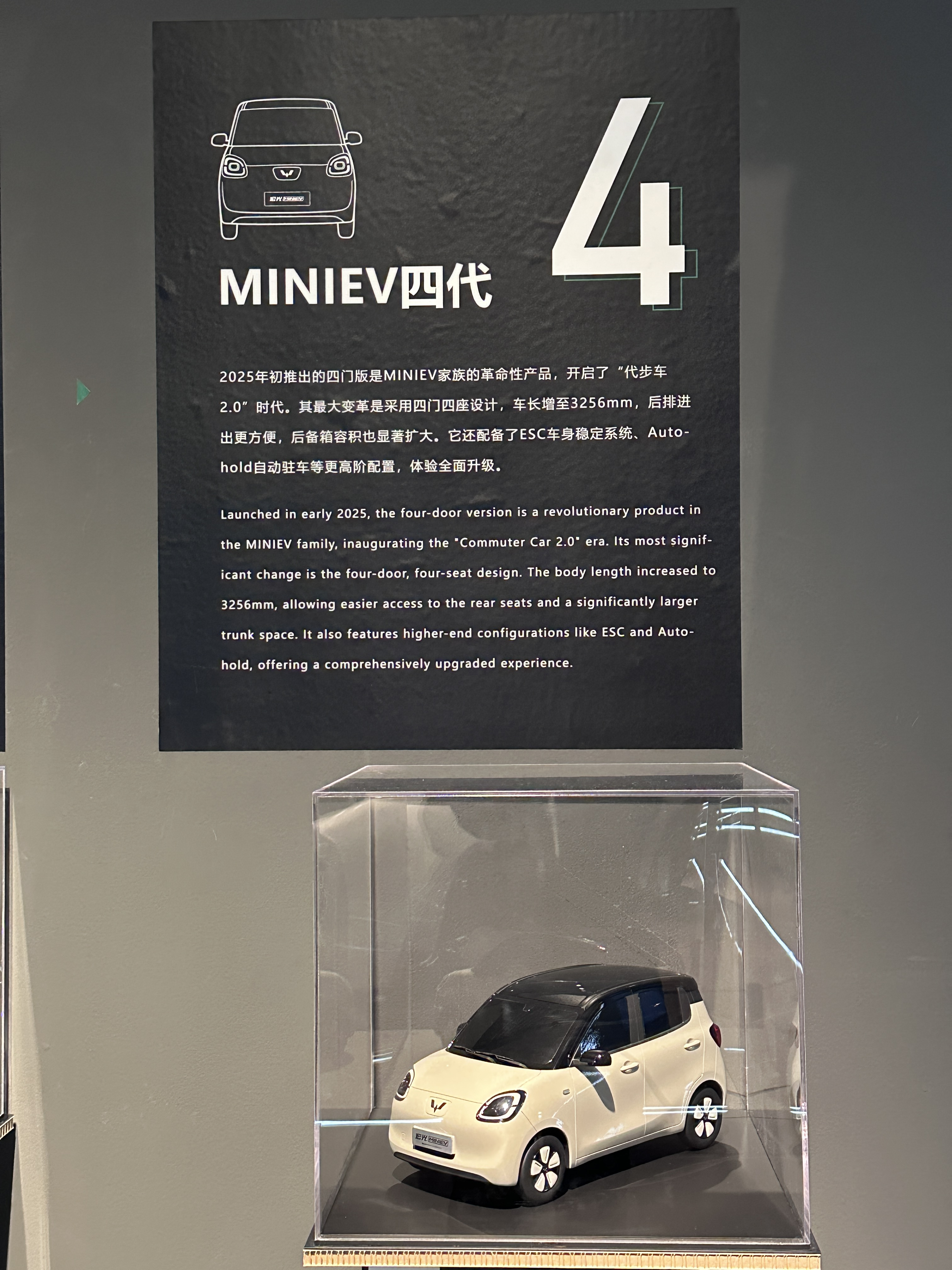
Diecast model on display stating the model as the fourth generation Hongguang Mini EV

=== 2026 (facelift) ===
The facelifted second generation Wuling Hongguang Mini EV, officially marketed as the fifth-generation model, was unveiled in February 2026. It was first unveiled via photos released by the Ministry of Industry and Information Technology in December 2025. As with the pre-facelifted second-generation model, the facelifted Hongguang Mini is available in both 3-door and 5-door versions. The facelifted model's dimensions are also different from the pre-facelift model.

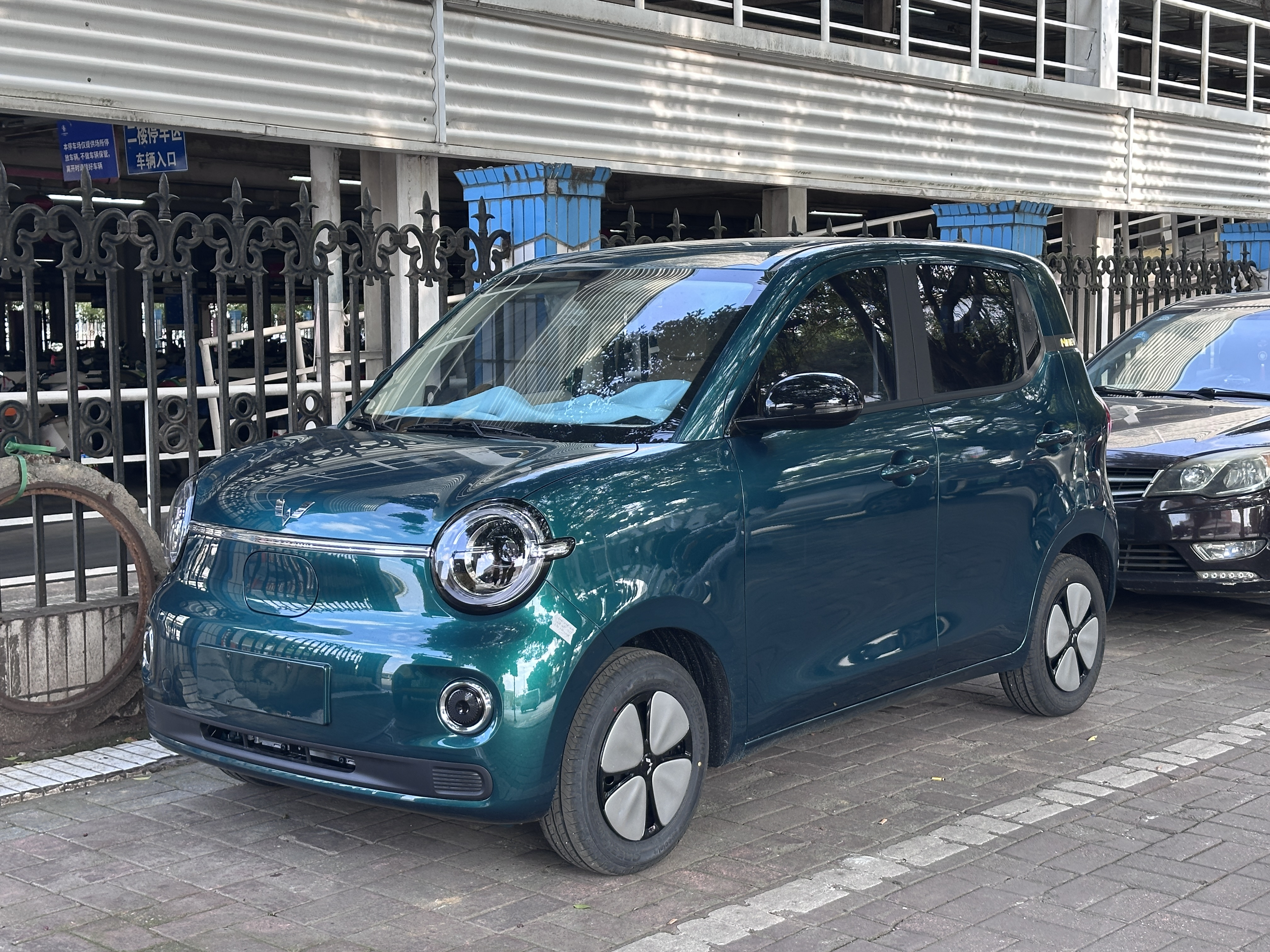
Wuling Hongguang Mini EV 2026 (facelift)

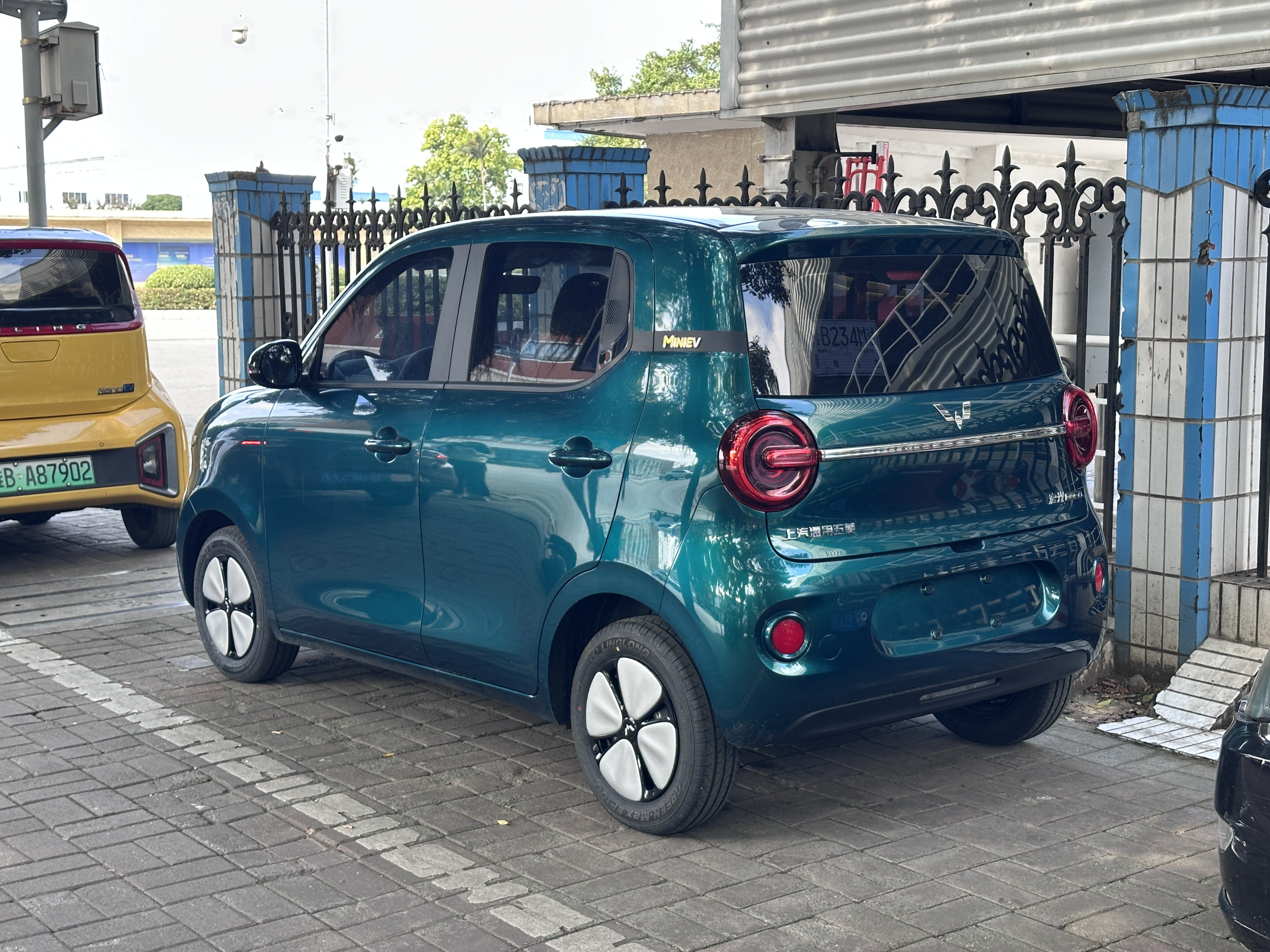
Rear view

=== Markets ===
==== Indonesia ====
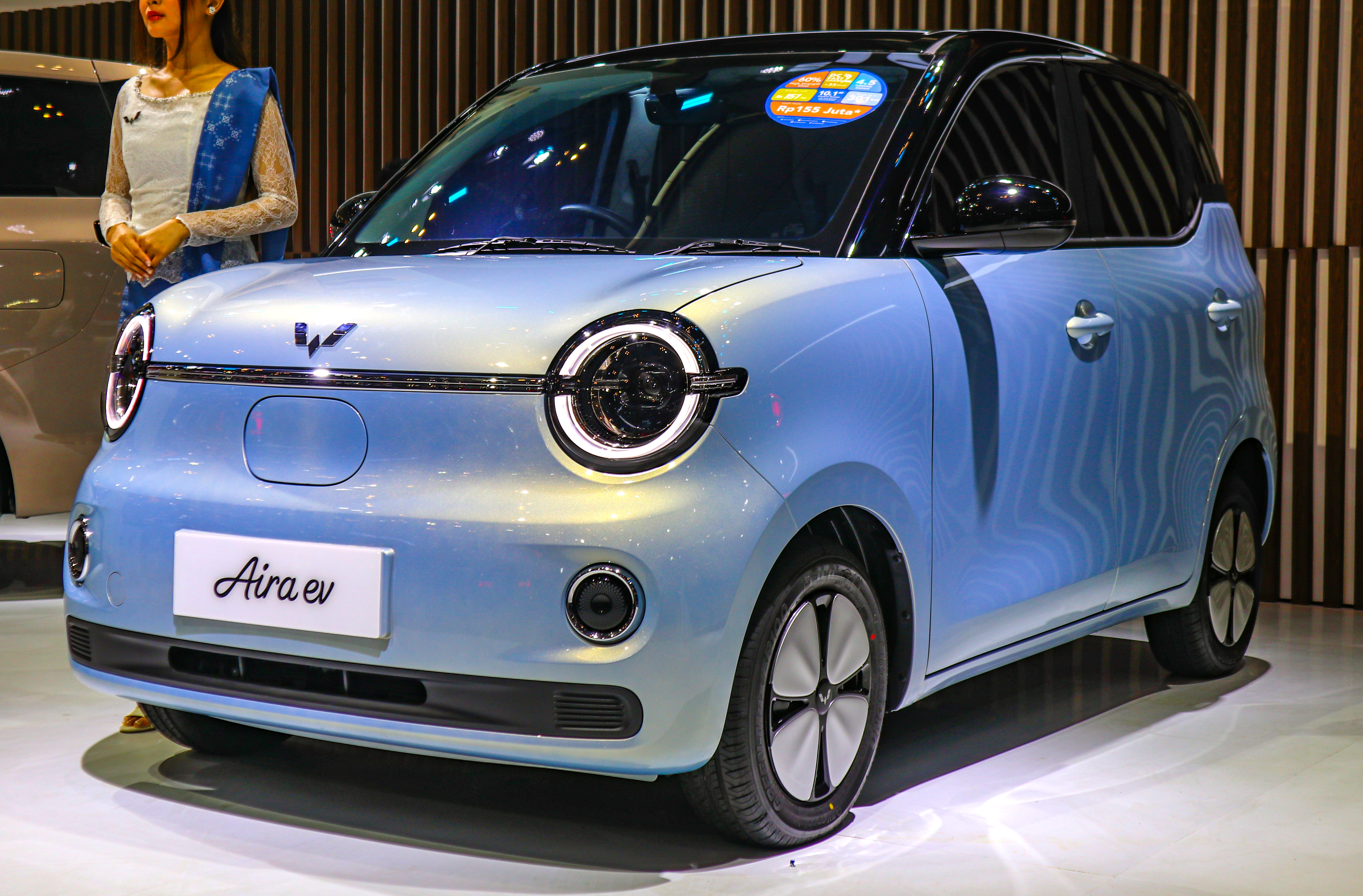
Wuling Aira EV

The 5-door version was introduced in Indonesia as the Aira EV on 11 July 2026, and was then launched on 29 July 2026 at the 33rd Gaikindo Indonesia International Auto Show. Assembled locally at Cikarang plant, It is available with Standard Range and Long Range variants.

The Toy Story edition was released at the 33rd Gaikindo Indonesia International Auto Show. Based on Long Range variant, it was limited run of 300 units. The decal stickers offered are different in each color: Black-painted colour carries the Woody character theme, light-brown colour carries the Buzz Lightyear character theme, and dark blue colour carries the Jessie character theme.

According to SGMW Indonesia, the name Aira is portmanteau of the words "Air".

==== Vietnam ====
The 5-door version was launched in Vietnam as the Mini EV Macaron on 15 July 2026, with 205 km and 300 km variants.

== Sales ==
With six months in the market, the Mini EV sold 119,255 units in 2020, and ranked as China's and the world's second best selling plug-in car after the Tesla Model 3.

In January 2021, according to the China Passenger Car Association (CPCA), the Mini EV topped new energy vehicles sales with 25,778 units, compared to the Tesla Model 3 with 13,843 units sold in China.

The Mini EV listed as the world's top selling plug-in car in January 2021.

The 2 millionth Hongguang MiniEV rolled off the production line on 20 October 2026.

Year	China
2020	127,651
2021	395,451
2022	404,823
2023	237,863
2024	261,141
2025	424,983
