= Chery QQ =

Logo Since 2026.

Chery QQ is a series of city cars produced by Chinese automobile manufacturer Chery Automobile. The first of the series was the QQ hatchback in 2003, later renamed QQ3 in 2006 to sell alongside the QQ6. Other models have been included in the lineup since then. The series includes:

- Chery QQ3 S11 (2003–2015), a 5-door hatchback
- Chery QQ3 S13 (2013–2022), a 5-door hatchback
- Chery QQ6 (2006–2010), a 4-door sedan
- Chery QQme (2009–2011), a 3-door hatchback
- Chery QQ Ice Cream (2021–present), a 3-door electric hatchback
- QQ3 (2026–present), a 5-door hatchback
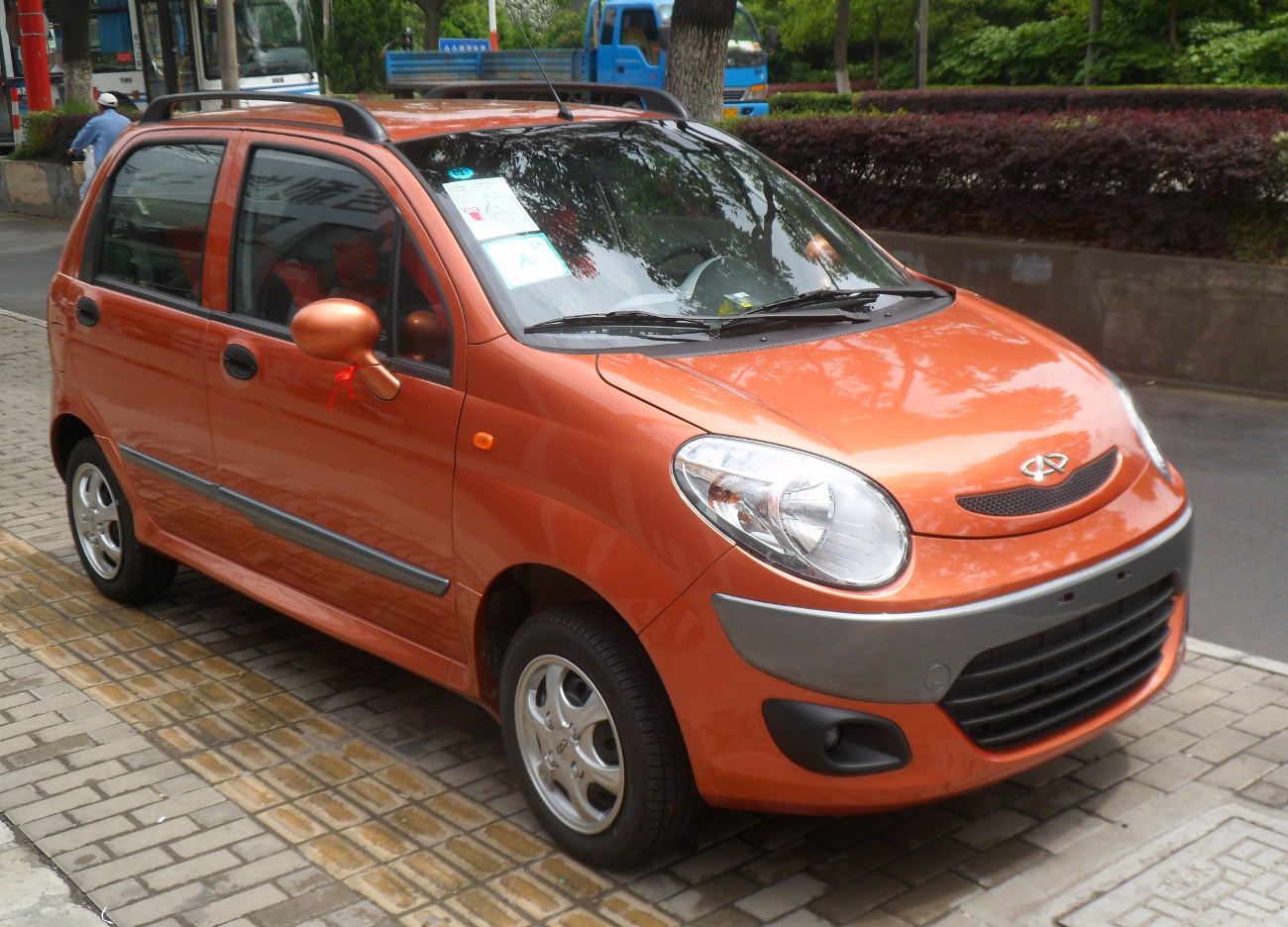
2003–2013 Chery QQ3

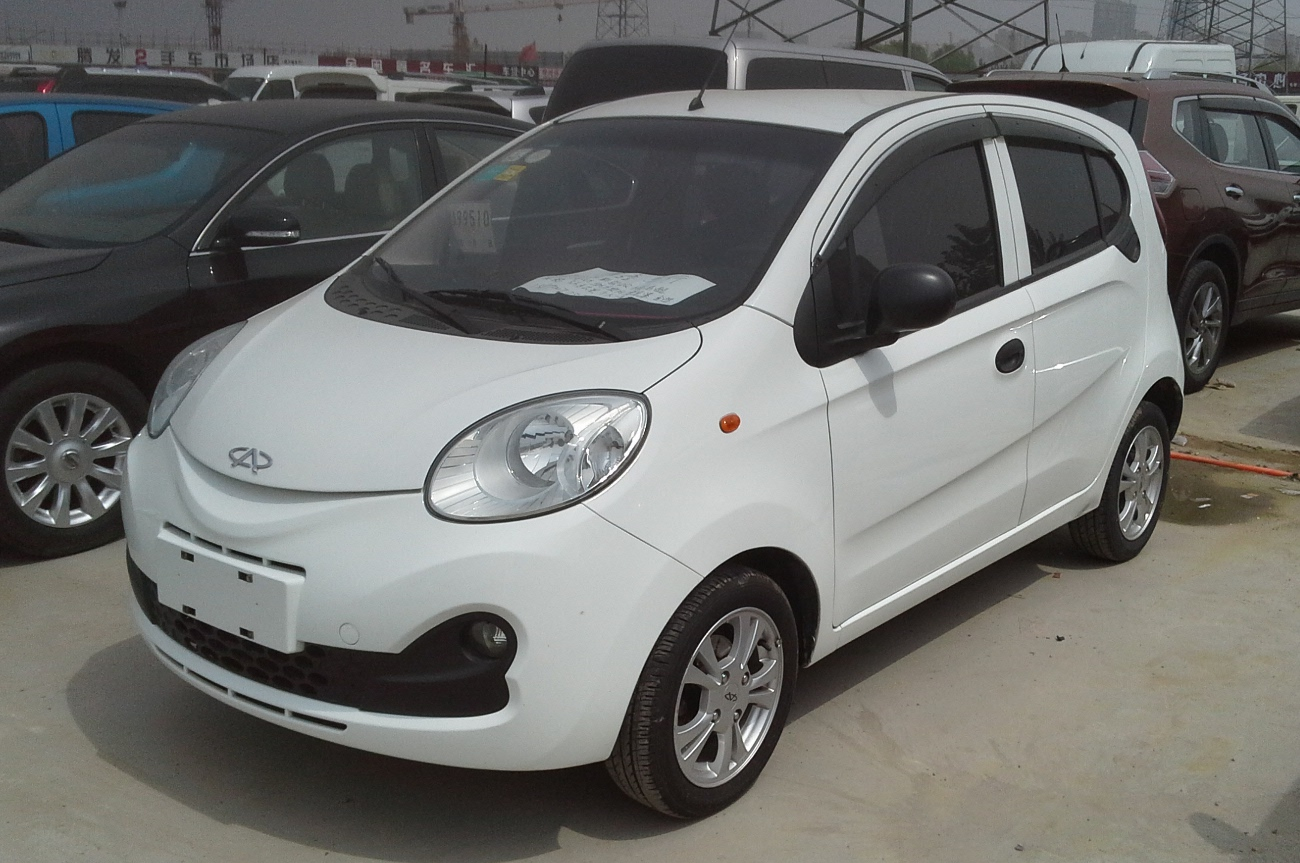
2013–2022 Chery QQ3

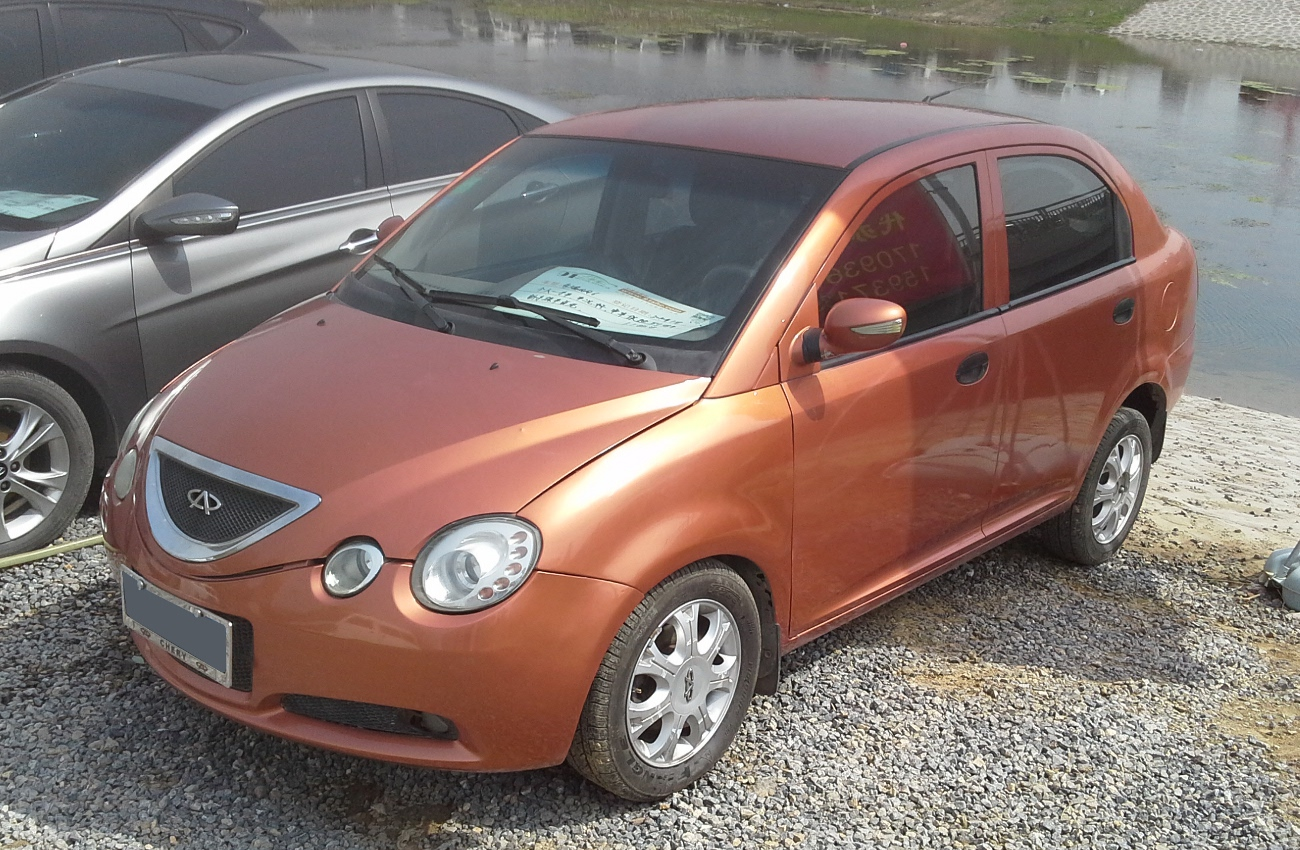
2006–2010 Chery QQ6

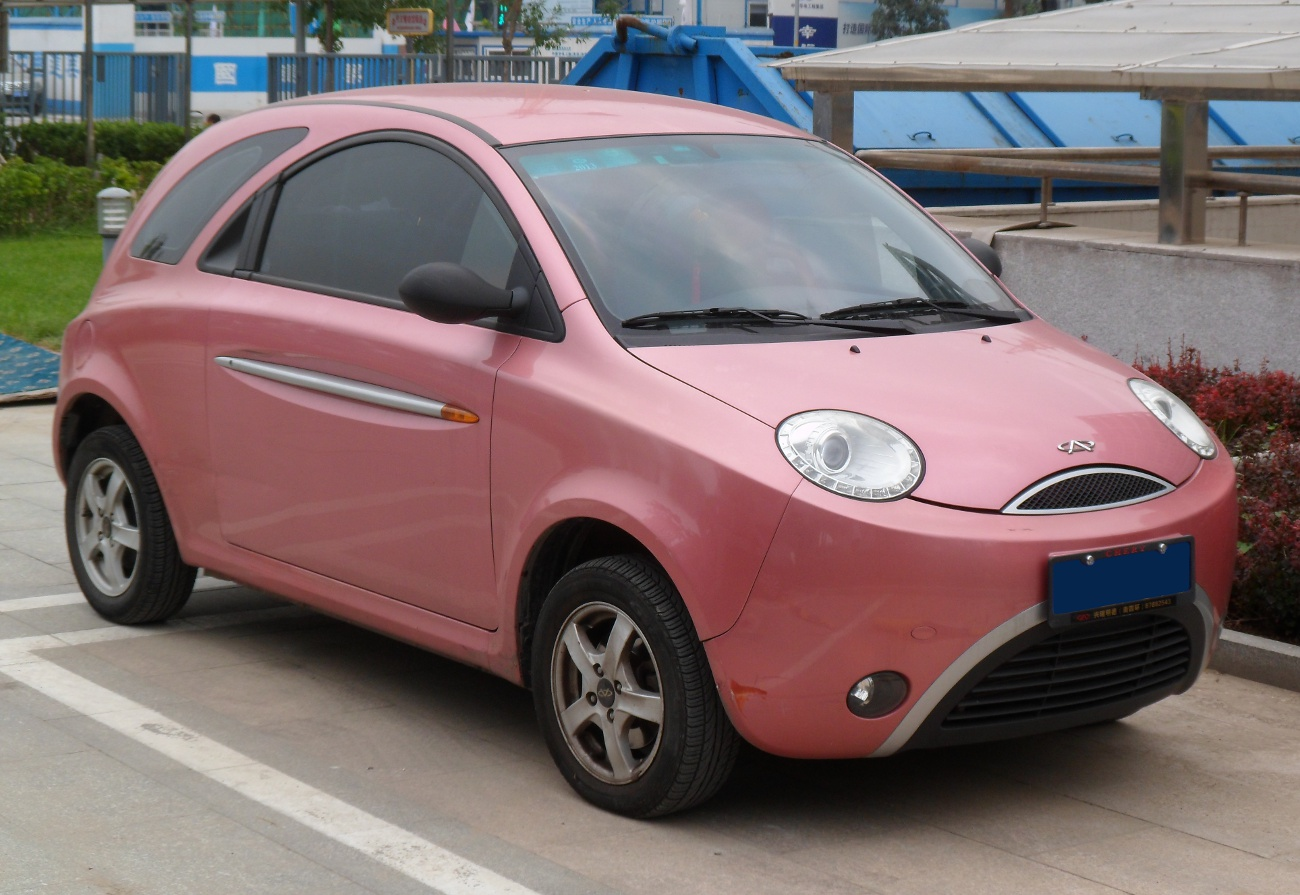
2009–2011 Chery QQme

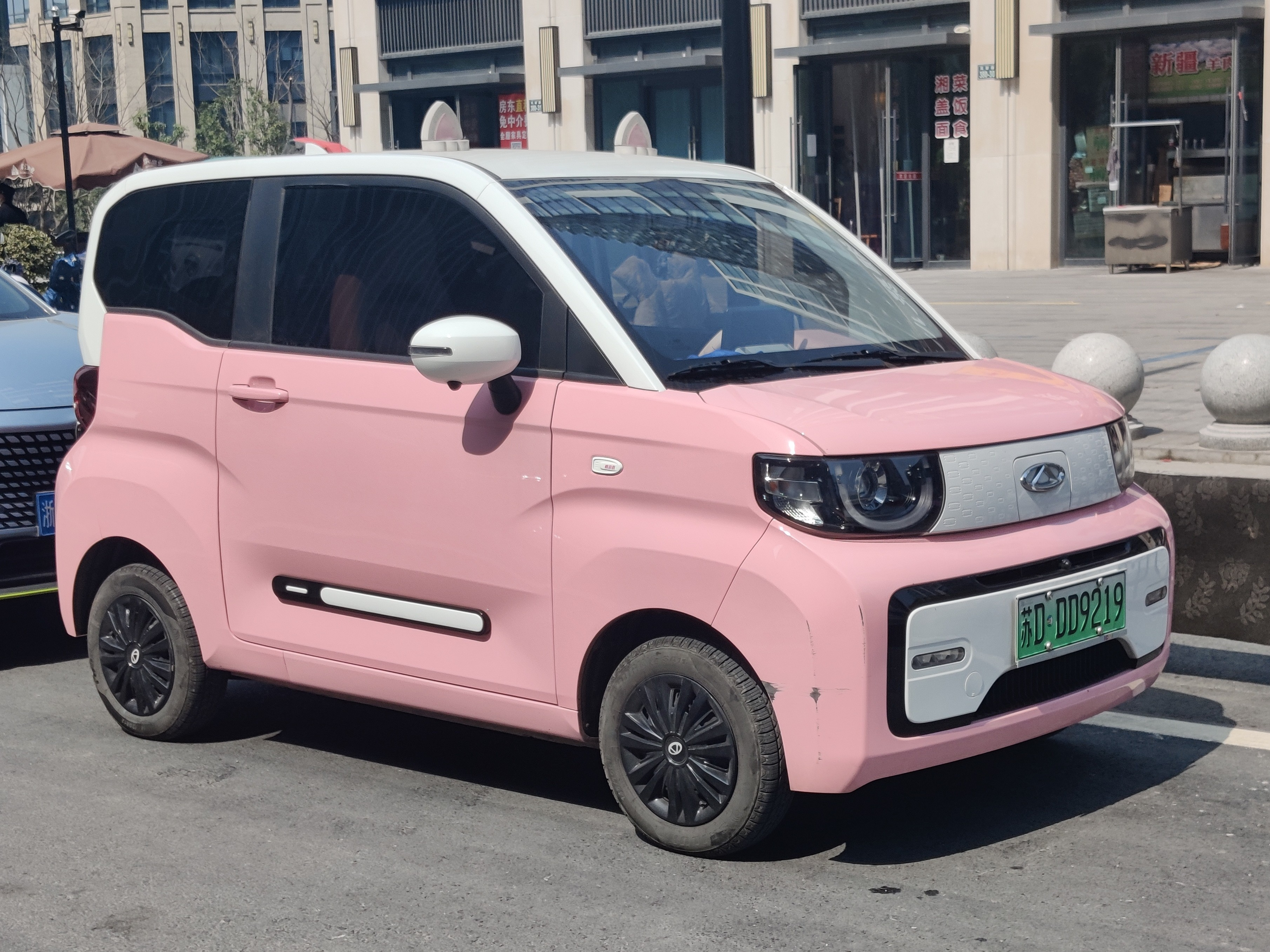
2021–present Chery QQ Ice Cream

2026–present QQ3
