= Chery QQme =

Chinese city car

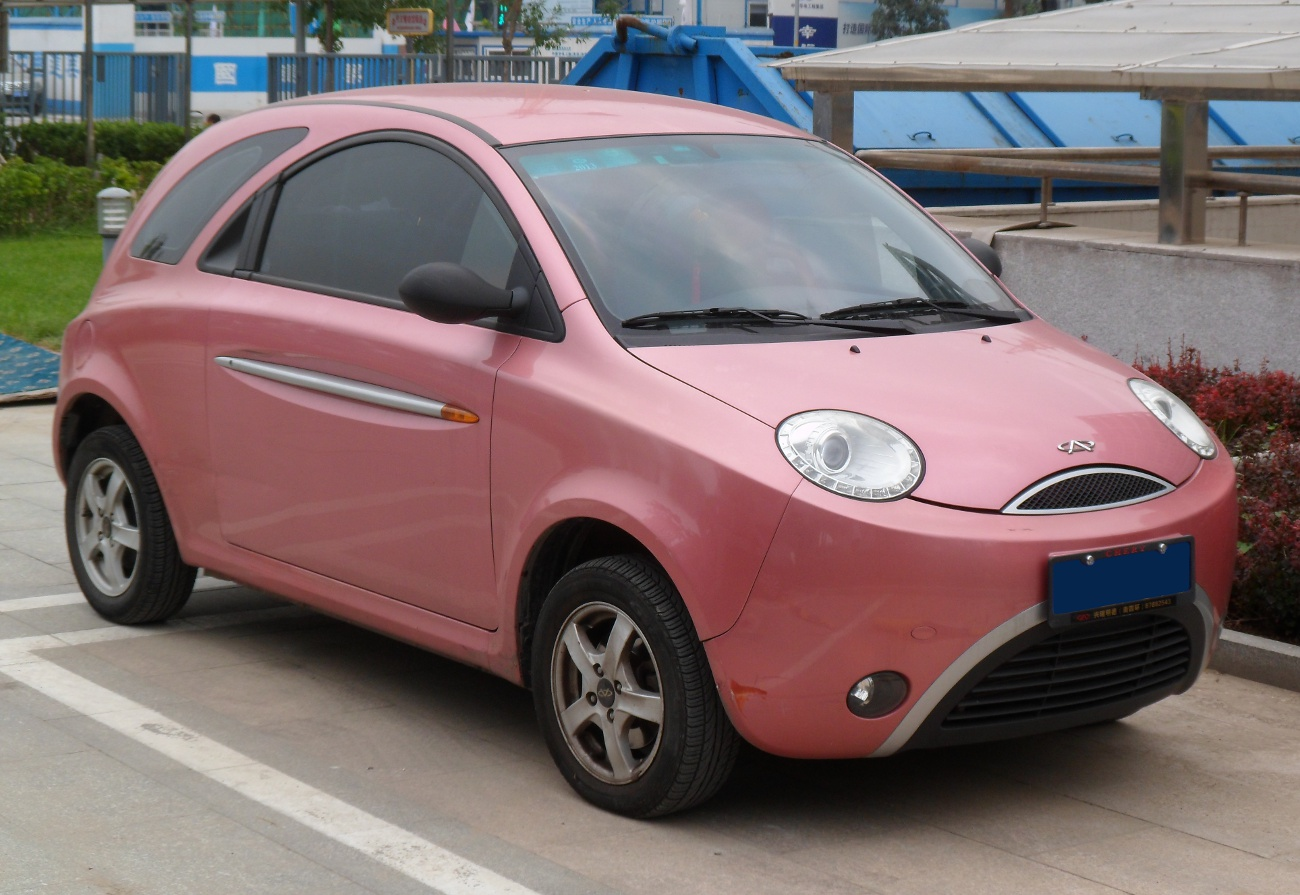

Overview
- Manufacturer: Chery
- Production: 2009–2011
- Assembly: Wuhu, Anhui, China
- Designer: Enrico Fumia

Body and chassis
- Body style: 3-door hatchback
- Related: Chery QQ6; Chery QQ3

Powertrain
- Engine: 1.3 L I4 (petrol)
- Transmission: 5-speed automatic

Dimensions
- Wheelbase: 2,315 mm (91.1 in)
- Length: 3,747 mm (147.5 in)
- Width: 1,597 mm (62.9 in)
- Height: 1,514 mm (59.6 in)

The Chery QQme (codeproject S16) is a city car produced by the Chinese manufacturer Chery Automobile from 2009 to 2011.

== Overview ==
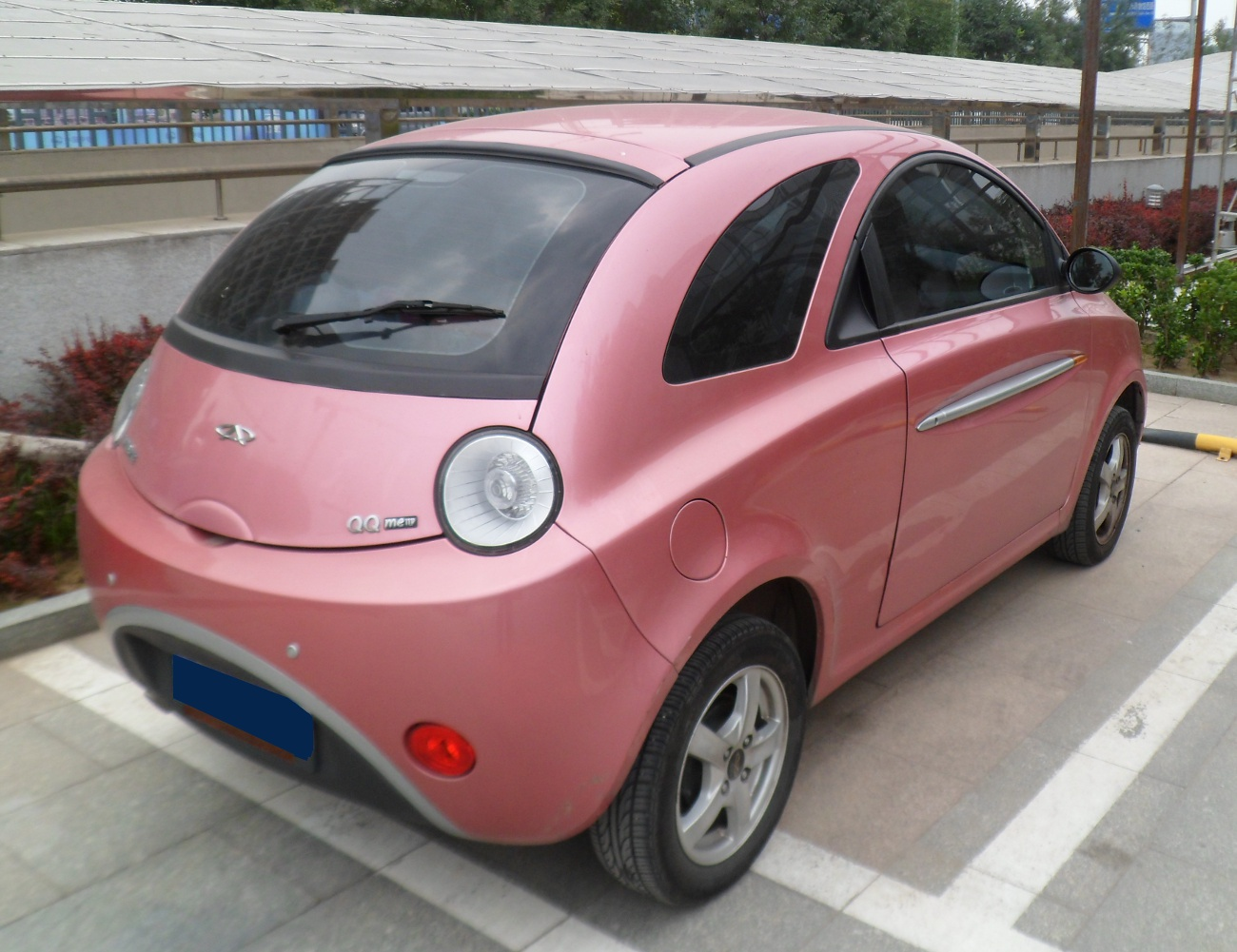
Chery QQme rear

Chery created a QQ-branded product line in 2006 that included the original QQ (rebadged as a QQ3), a sedan version called Chery QQ6 and the three door Chery QQme. Prices of the QQme ranged from 55,000 yuan to 69,000 yuan with sales per year ranging from a few hundreds up to just above a thousand units.

== Sales ==
The car sold in 1,350 units in 2009, 374 units in 2010 and only 102 cars were sold in the full 2011 fiscal year. Production has ceased. In all, the car sold in only 1,826 units.
