= Chery eQ1 =

Battery electric city car

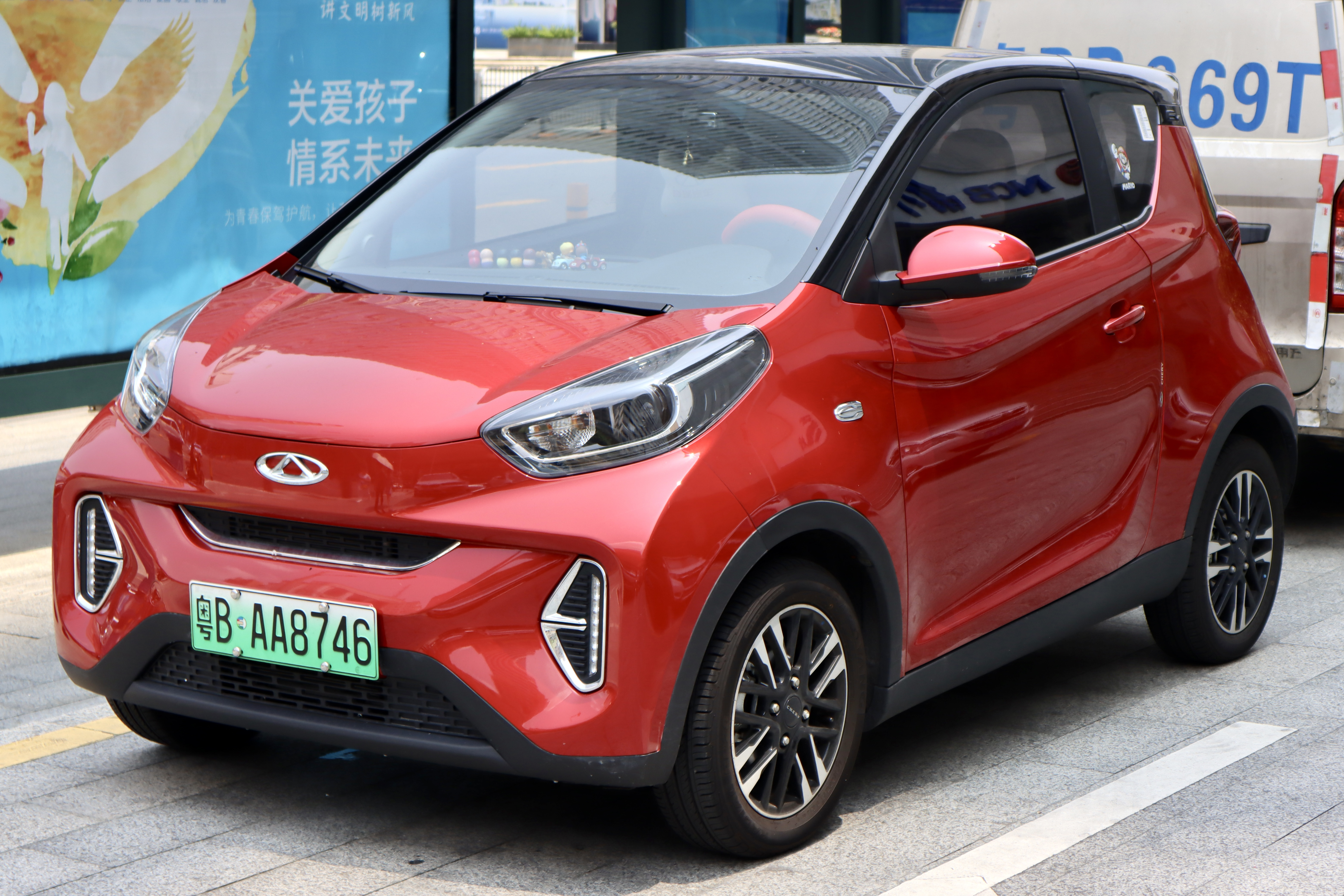

Overview
- Manufacturer: Chery
- Model code: S51 EV
- Also called: DR 1.0 (Italy); Sportequipe 1 (Italy); Chery iCar (Brazil); MASADA EQ1 (South Korea); Aiqar eQ1 (Armenia, Bolivia, Cambodia, Curaçao, Georgia, Uzbekistan)
- Production: 2017–present
- Assembly: China

Body and chassis
- Class: City car (A)
- Body style: 3-door hatchback
- Layout: Rear motor, rear-wheel drive
- Related: Chery eQ

Powertrain
- Electric motor: 30 kW permanent magnet synchronous (PMSM); 36 kW PMSM; 56 kW PMSM
- Power output: 30 kW (40 hp; 41 PS); 36 kW (48 hp; 49 PS); 56 kW (75 hp; 76 PS)
- Battery: 24.0–40.3 kWh
- Electric range: 251–408 km (156–254 mi)

Dimensions
- Wheelbase: 2,150 mm (84.6 in)
- Length: 3,200 mm (126.0 in)
- Width: 1,670 mm (65.7 in)
- Height: 1,550 mm (61.0 in)
- Curb weight: 975–1,275 kg (2,150–2,811 lb)

The Chery eQ1 is a battery electric city car that is manufactured by Chinese manufacturer Chery.

== Overview ==
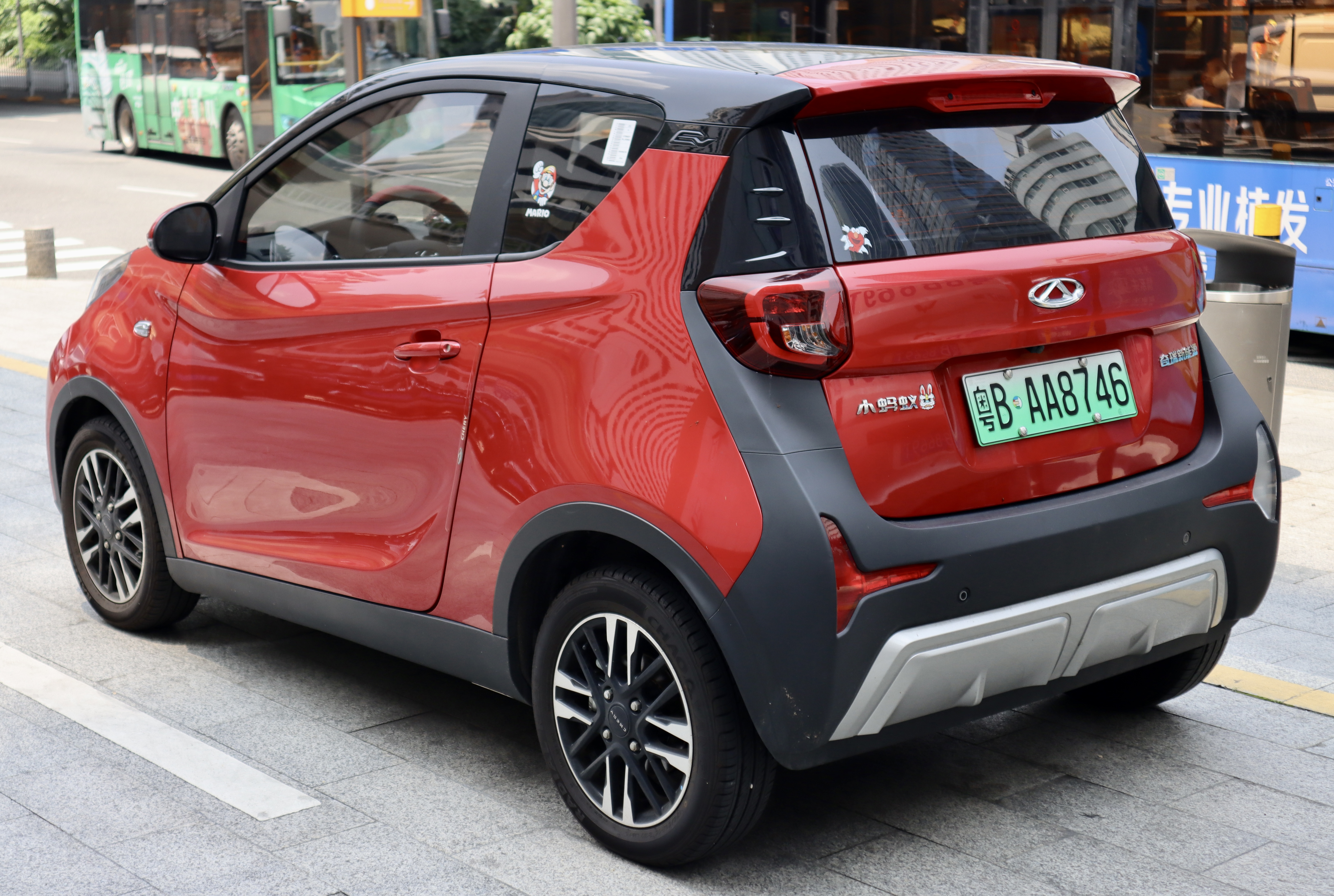
Rear view

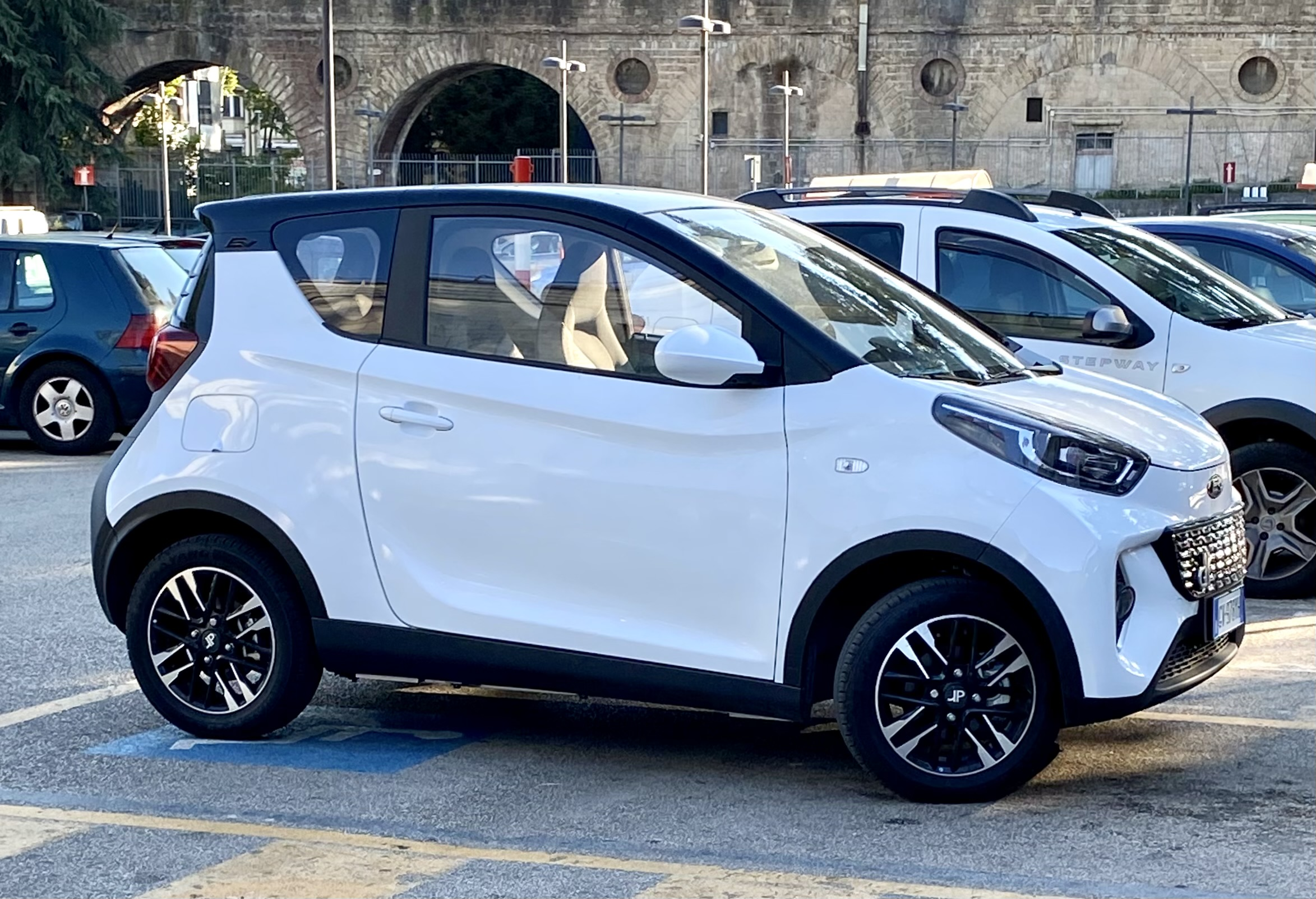
DR 1.0

The eQ1 was originally planned to be called the Chery @ant during the reveal in 2016, but was later given the eQ1 name in line with the Chery eQ. The Chinese nickname was still the "Ant" during the official launch in 2017.

Originally code-named the Chery S51 EV, the Chery eQ1 is powered by a permanent magnet synchronous electric motor putting out 30 kW (40 hp) and 120 N⋅m (89 lb⋅ft). The top speed of the eQ1 is 100 km/h (62 mph).

The Chery eQ1 was available as part of the EvCard electric car-sharing service in China as of 2018.

The battery capacity has been upgraded since the launch. (Note: The vehicle was previously offered with a smaller battery and a 151-km advertised NEDC range. As of December 21, 2019, the English-language information on the Chery website still refers only to the range with the old, smaller battery, while the specification in the Chinese language is more up to date.) For the 2019 model year, the stated battery capacity is at least 30.6 kWh, with the latest version reportedly having a 38 kWh battery. The stated NEDC range is 301 kilometres (187 mi).

Charging takes 5–7 hours using a 6.6 kW charger, while fast charging from 30% to 80% takes 30–50 minutes.

=== 2023 (facelift) ===
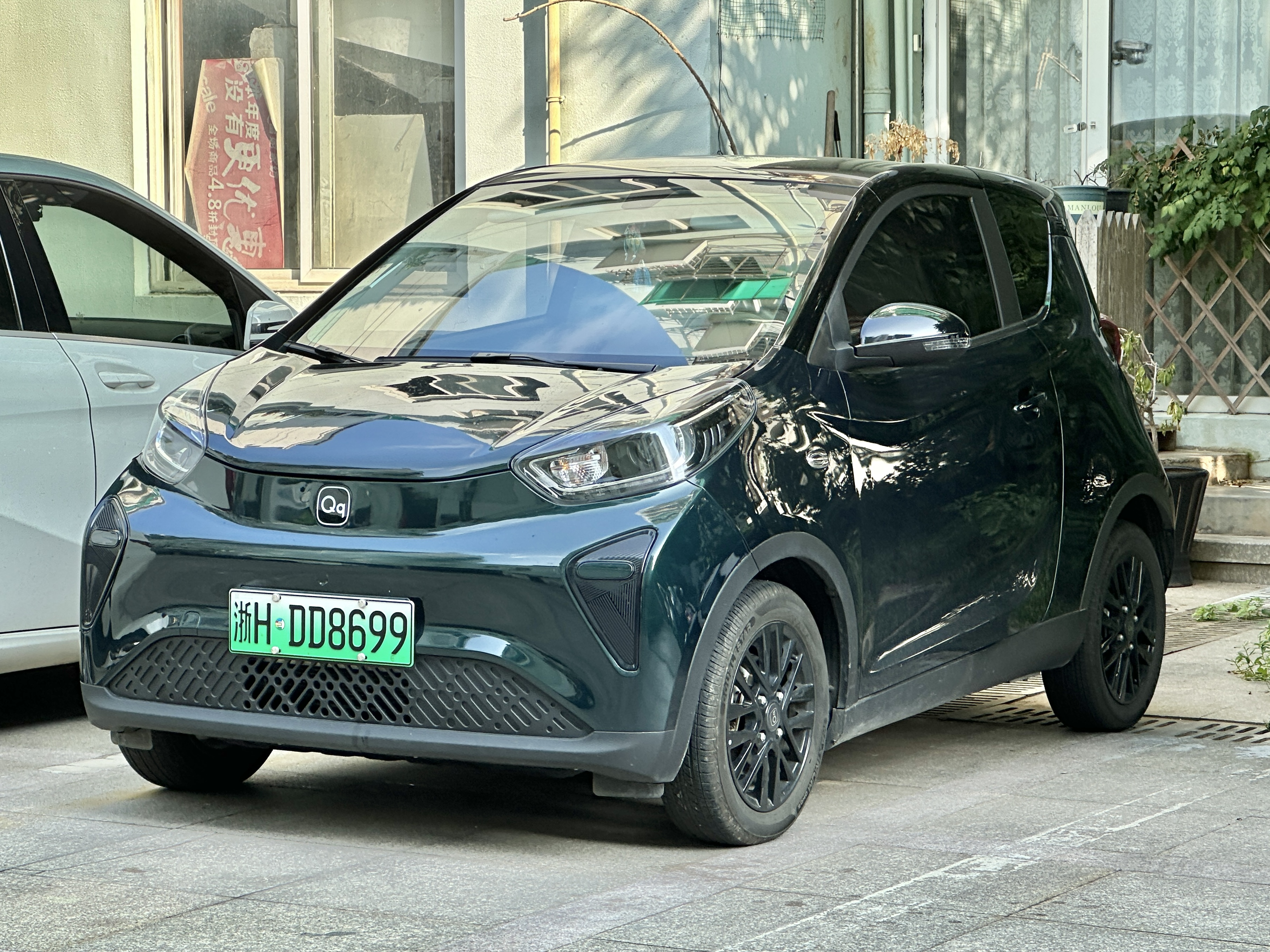
Chery Ant Q

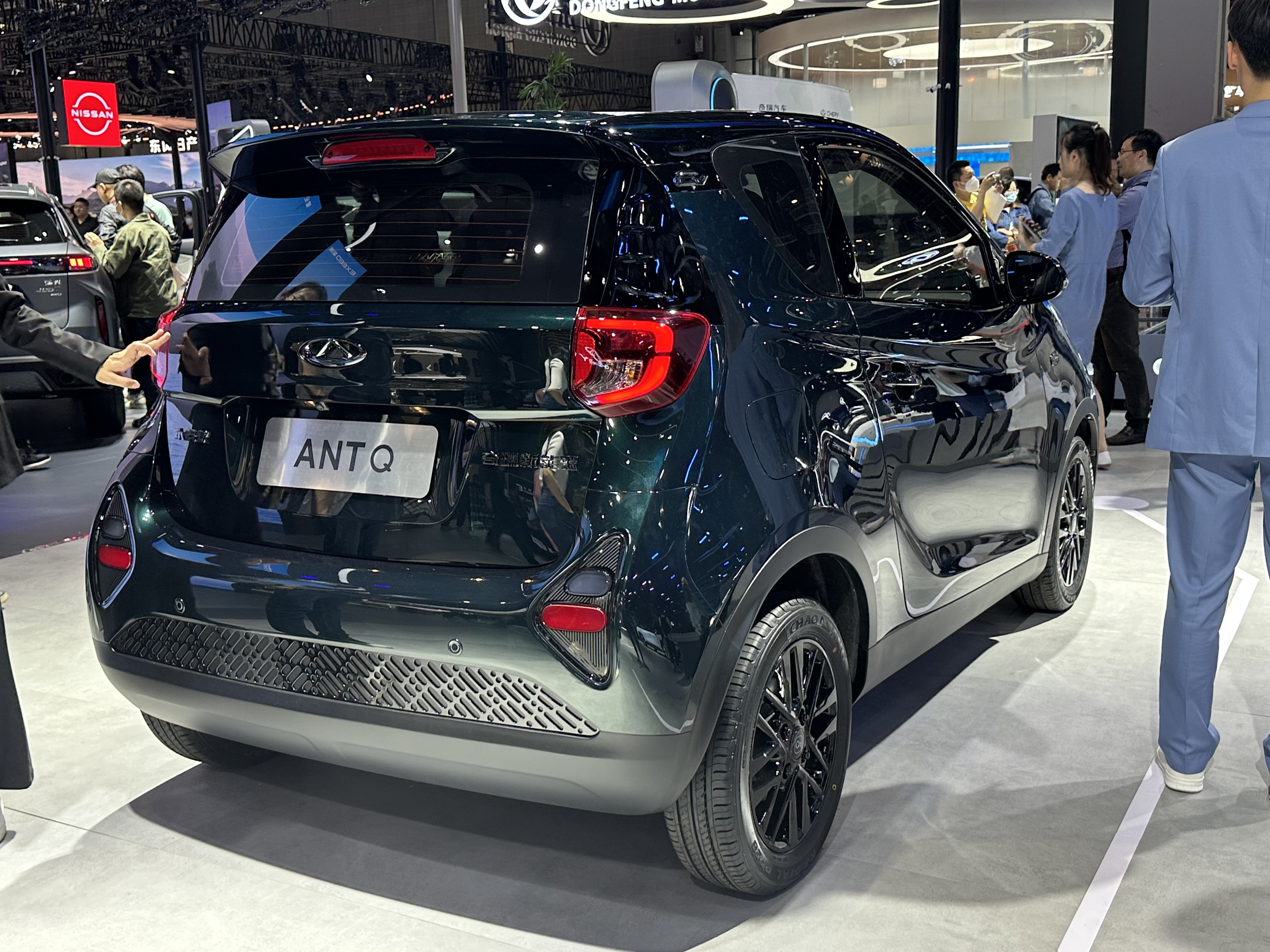
Rear view

On 28 October 2023 Chery launched an updated version of the Little Ant in China called the New Edition, which is sold alongside the previous version, marketed as the Classic Edition. The update was first previewed in April 2023 during Auto Shanghai as the Ant Q, while the production version kept the Little Ant name and was rebranded under the QQ product series.

Changes to the exterior include a new a new front clip that lacks a grille, a 'floating roof' paint design, black-painted 15-inch wheels, and updated badging, while the dimensions remain unchanged and the headlights and lower front air intake are retained. The chassis is now made fully of aluminium. The interior features two-tone seating and steering wheel upholstery, with a digital gauge cluster and a 10.1-inch central infotainment display with Bluetooth and WeChat integration along with a wireless charging pad.

== Powertrain ==
The eQ1 comes standard with a permanent magnet electric motor outputting 36 kW (48 hp; 49 PS) and 95 N⋅m (70 lb⋅ft) of torque. Several battery packs are available, including 24.0 kWh LFP, 25.1 kWh LFP, 28.9 kWh NMC, and 29.2 kWh LFP; the first two have a CLTC range rating of 251 kilometres (156 mi), while the latter two are rated at 301 kilometres (187 mi).

At launch of the facelift, a higher end powertrain with an upgraded electric motor making 56 kW (75 hp; 76 PS) and 150 N⋅m (111 lb⋅ft) of torque and a 40.3 kWh NMC battery pack with a CLTC range rating of 408 kilometres (254 mi) was available. However, this version appears to have been discontinued by 2024.

All versions have a top speed of 100 km/h (62 mph) and are capable of DC fast charging, allowing for 30–80% charging time of 40 minutes.

Powertrains
Battery		Motor		Range (CLTC)
Type	Supplier	Power	Torque	Range (CLTC)
23.99 LFP	One Energy	36 kW (48 hp; 49 PS)	95 N⋅m (70 lb⋅ft)	251 km (156 mi)
25.05 LFP	Gotion	36 kW (48 hp; 49 PS)	95 N⋅m (70 lb⋅ft)	251 km (156 mi)
28.86 NMC	DFD Energy	36 kW (48 hp; 49 PS)	95 N⋅m (70 lb⋅ft)	301 km (187 mi)
29.23 LFP	Gotion	36 kW (48 hp; 49 PS)	95 N⋅m (70 lb⋅ft)	321 km (199 mi)
40.3 NMC	—	56 kW (75 hp; 76 PS)	150 N⋅m (110 lb⋅ft)	408 km (254 mi)

== Sales ==
Year	China	Europe (DR 1.0)
2023	29,275	490
2024	29,875	555
2025	18,299	797
