= United Auto Industries =

Pakistani automobile manufacturer

- Company type: Private
- Industry: Automotive
- Founded: 1999; 27 years ago
- Headquarters: Lahore, Pakistan
- Key people: Sana Ullah Chaudhary (CEO)
- Products: Motorcycles, Vehicles, Auto rickshaws
- Website: unitedmotorcycle.com.pk(for motorcycles) unitedcars.com.pk(for cars and trucks)

United Auto Industries (United Motors; Urdu: یونائیٹڈ موٹرز) is a Pakistani automobile manufacturer based in Lahore, Punjab.

== History ==
United Auto Industries (Pvt) Ltd. came into existence in 1999 by introducing economical 4-stroke motorcycles and Auto rickshaws with the brand name of UNITED.

United Auto is now engaged in manufacturing of loaders, scooters, rickshaws and bikes in Pakistan. It has a joint venture with a Chinese automaker to produce these two new vehicles for the Pakistani market.

== Products ==
=== Cars ===
- United Bravo (Dahe DH350 S)
- United Alpha (Chery QQ3)
- United Altas

=== Commercial Vehicles ===
- United Punjnad (light pickup truck)
- United Tezdaar (heavy pickup truck)

=== Motorcycles and Rickshaws70cc ===
- United Scooty 100cc
- United Jazba 100cc
- United 125cc
- United 125cc Deluxe
- United 150cc (Ultimate Thrill)
- United Motorcycle Rickshaw 100cc
- United Auto Rickshaw 3 Seater 200cc
- United Auto Rickshaw 6 Seater 200cc
- United High Roof Pickup Rickshaw
- United Loader 150cc
- United Loader 150cc Deluxe
- United Loader 150cc Deluxe Plus
- United Loader 150cc Premier
- United Auto Loader 200cc
- United Motorcycle for Special Person

== See also ==
- List of motorcycle manufacturers
- List of car manufacturers
