= Chery QQ3 =

City car and subcompact hatchback

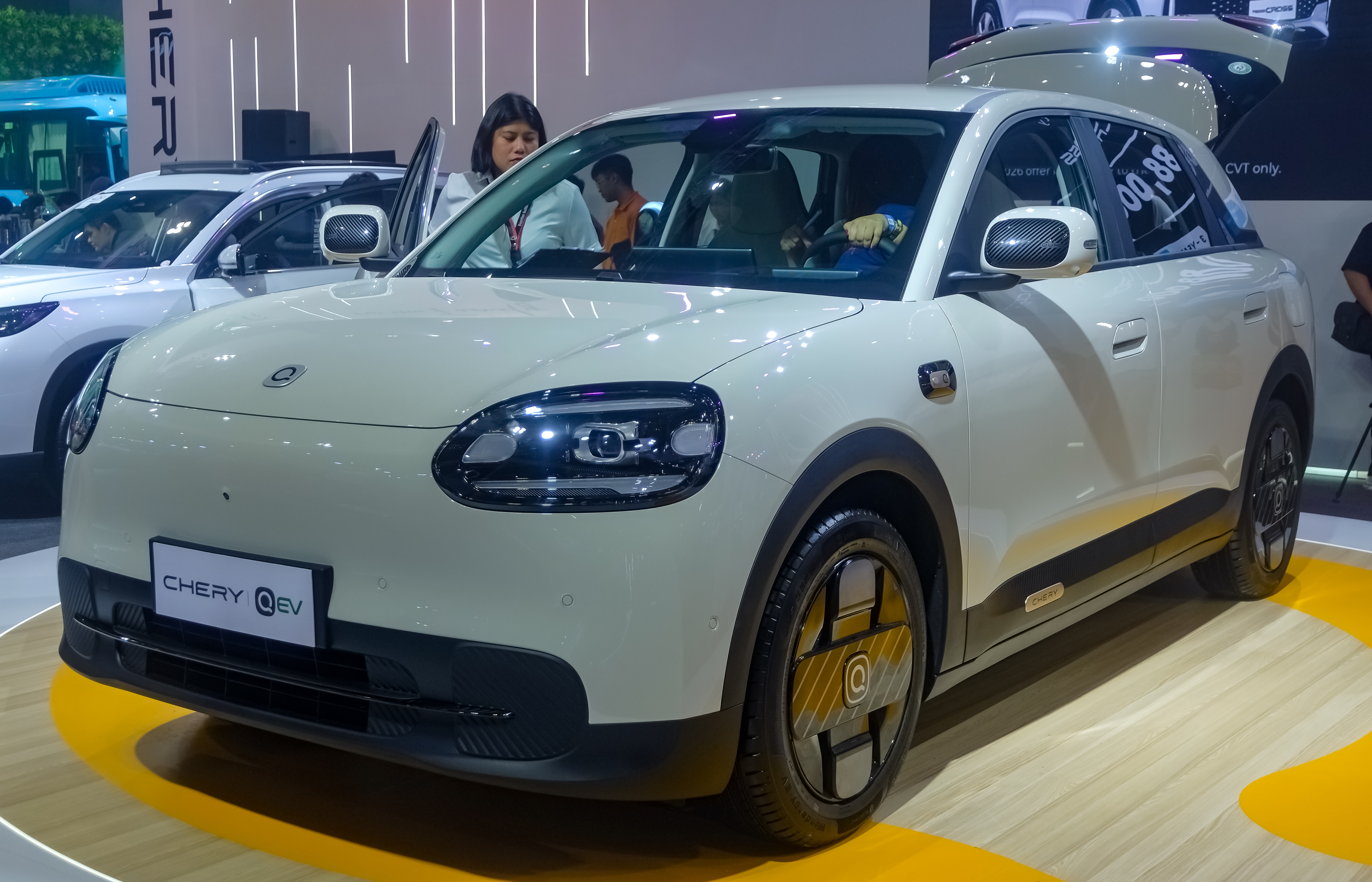

Overview
- Manufacturer: Chery
- Production: 2003–2022; 2026–present

Body and chassis
- Class: City car (2003–2022); Subcompact car (2026–present)
- Body style: 5-door hatchback

The Chery QQ3 is a city car and subcompact hatchback produced by the Chinese manufacturer Chery from May 2003. In 2006, Chery created a QQ-branded product line that included the original QQ (rebadged as a QQ3), a sedan version called Chery QQ6 released in September 2006 and a three-door hatchback called Chery QQme released in June 2009.

A slightly redesigned model of the original QQ was revealed at the 2011 Guangzhou Auto Show, and was renamed Chery QQ3 Sport.

At the 2013 Shanghai Auto Show, Chery introduced the second generation. It was sold by the DR Automobiles as the DR Zero in Italy.

In 2025 at Chengdu Auto Show, the third-generation Chery QQ3 made its official debut. Unlike the previous two generations of the QQ3 which were city cars, the third-generation QQ3 is a subcompact hatchback with a wheelbase exceeding 2,700 mm.

== First generation (2003) ==
First generation (S11)
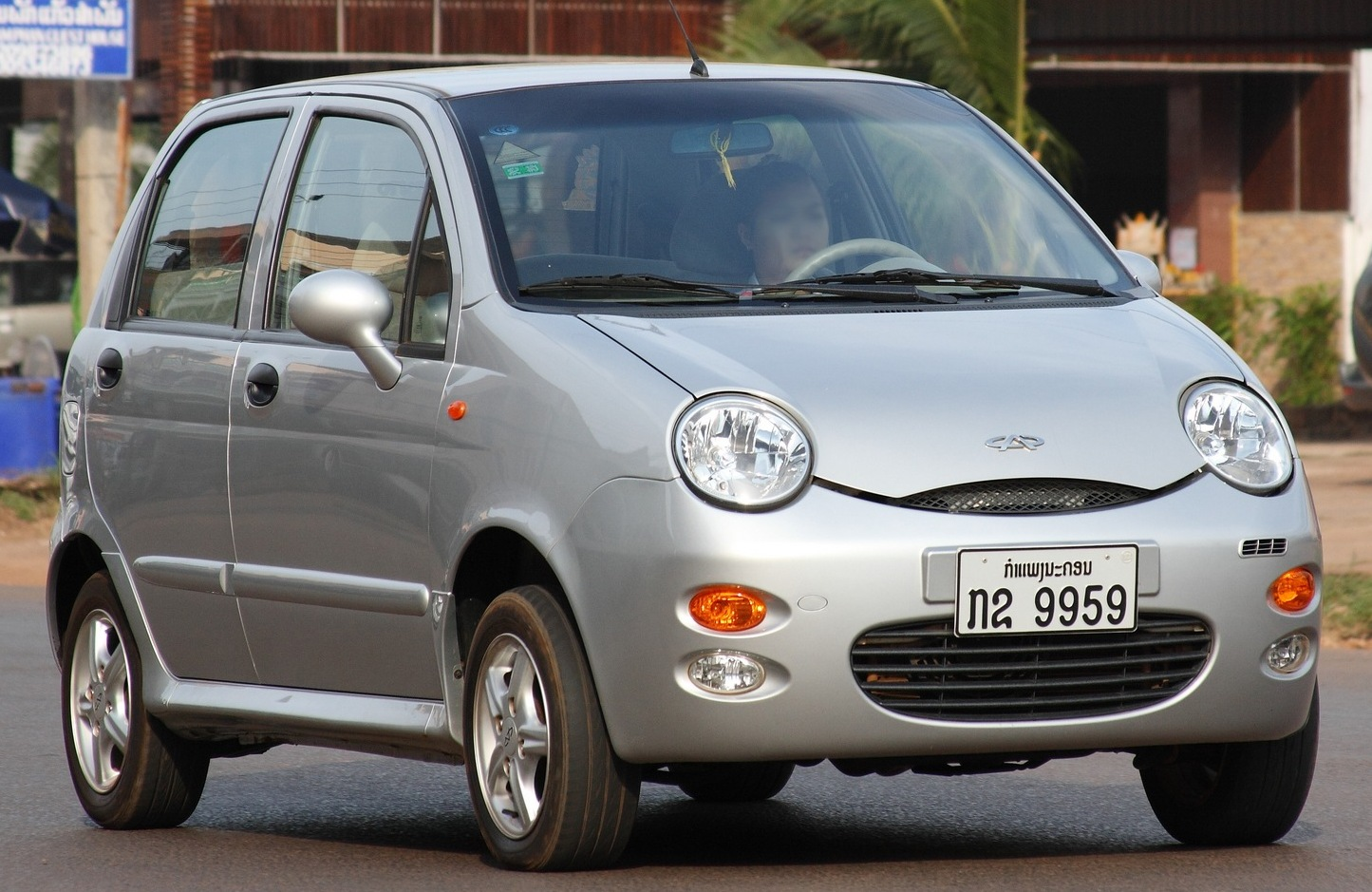

Overview
- Also called: Chery IQ (Chile); Chery Sweet (Russia); MVM 110 (Iran); Miles ZX50S (United States); United Alpha (Pakistan); Ruitesi Q1; Ruitesi Q2
- Production: July 2003–2015; 2021–2023 (Pakistan)
- Assembly: China: Wuhu, Anhui; Indonesia: Jakarta (National Assembler, 2006–2011); Iran: Bam, Kerman Province (MVM, 2005–2015); Pakistan: Lahore (United Motors, 2021–2023)

Body and chassis
- Layout: Front-engine, front-wheel-drive
- Related: Chery QQ6; Chery QQme; Chevrolet Spark

Powertrain
- Engine: 0.8 L SQR372 I3 (petrol); 1.1 L SQR472F I4 (petrol)
- Transmission: 5-speed manual; 5-speed automated manual

Dimensions
- Wheelbase: 2,340 mm (92.1 in)
- Length: 3,550 mm (139.8 in)
- Width: 1,495 mm (58.9 in)
- Height: 1,485 mm (58.5 in)

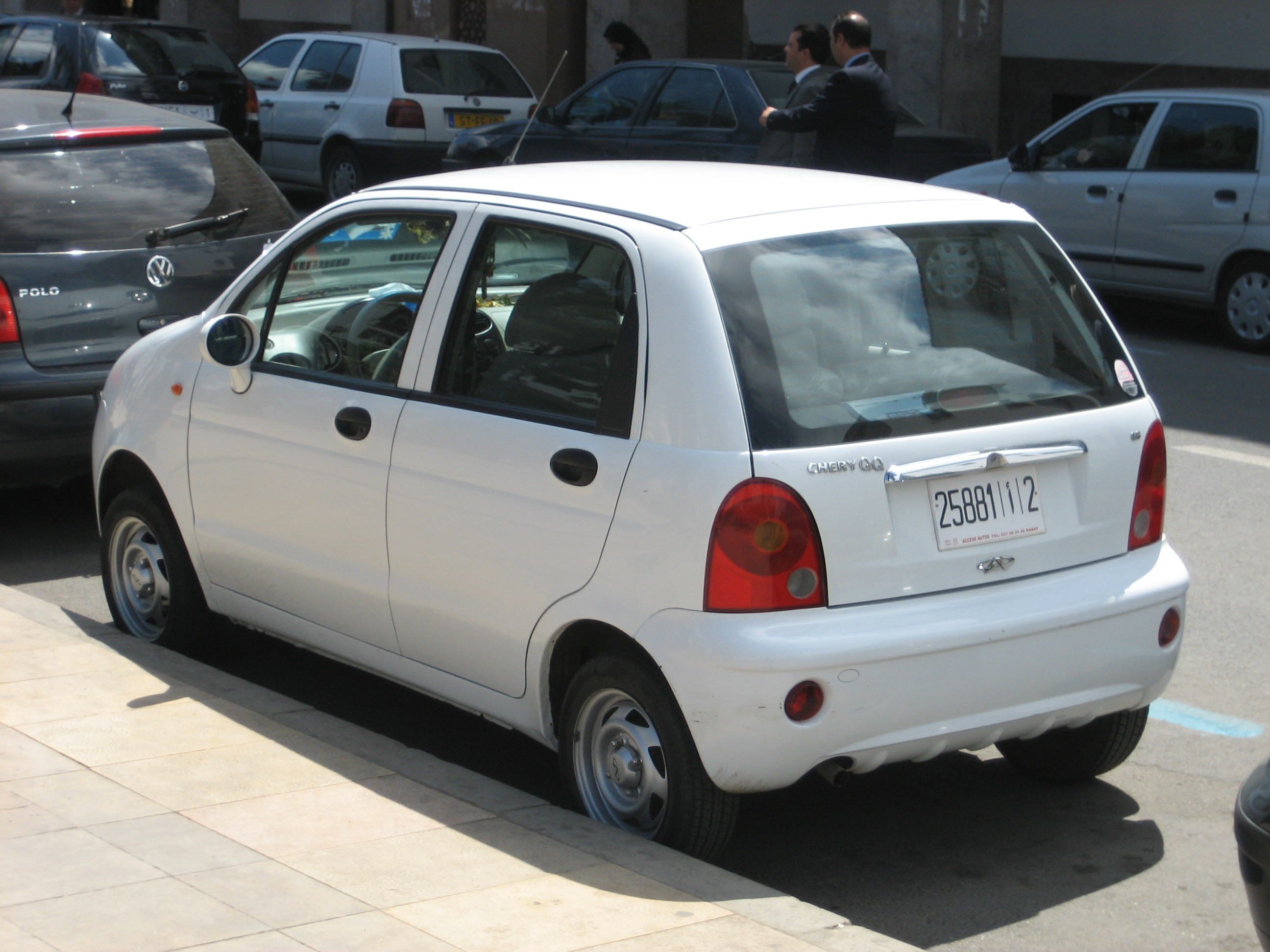
Rear view

Its cheap price (in 2008 it may have been the cheapest production car in the world) made the car popular in China. In the 2000s, the QQ was often Chery's most sold model, and the company itself calls the car "a legend in the Chinese history of the automobile... a mini model with the highest cumulative sales in China". However, its popularity has declined; the QQ was dropped from a list of top ten bestsellers compiled by the China Association of Automobile Manufacturers c. 2010. Even if its popularity is flagging, it remains cheap. The lowest costing QQ was about US$4,000 as of 2012.

=== Copying controversy ===
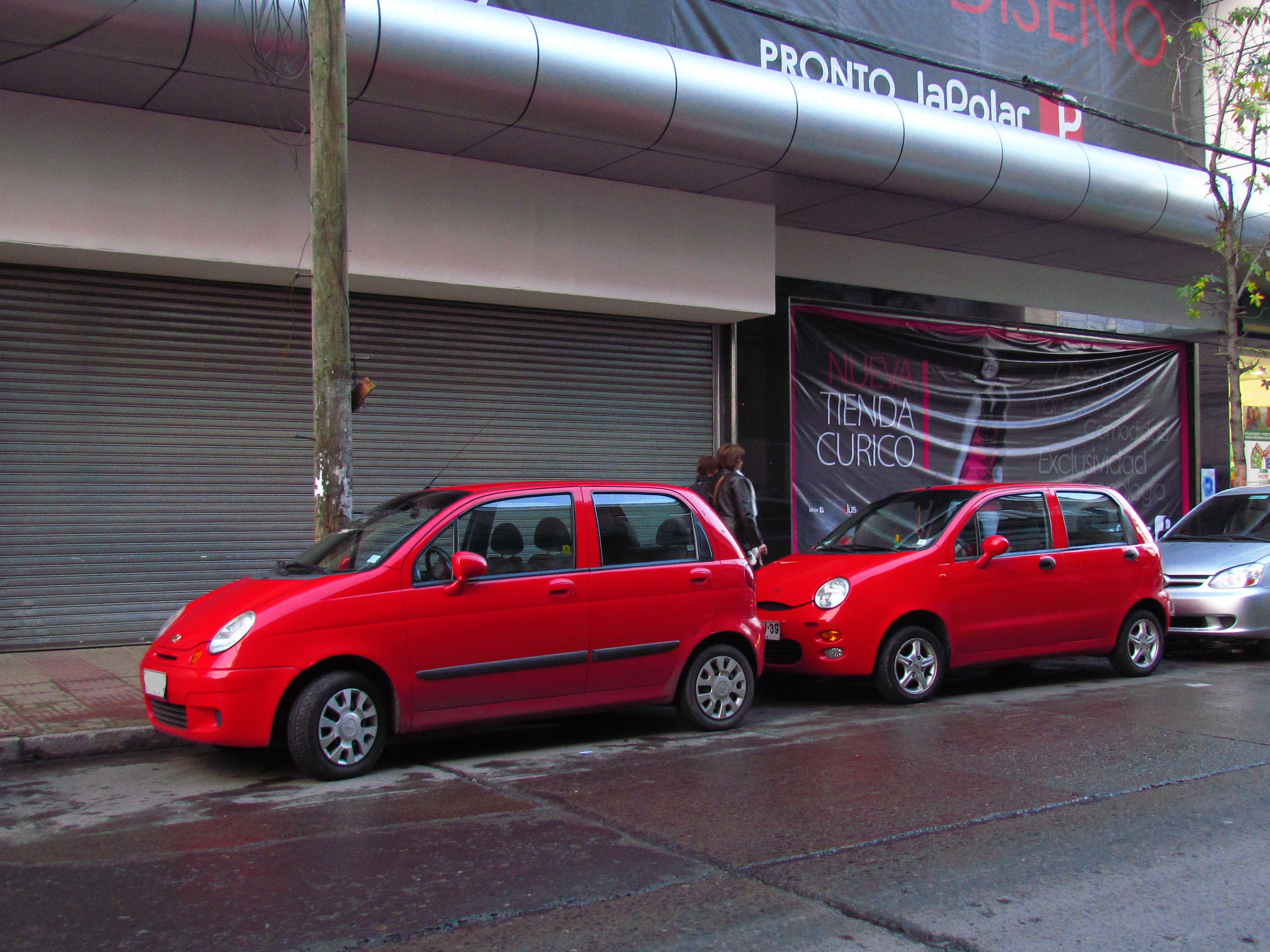
The Chevrolet Matiz/Spark (left) and the Chery QQ (right); the design of QQ is a copy of the original Matiz/Spark.

It was at the center of an intellectual property dispute between Chery and GM in the late 2000s.

General Motors claimed the car was a copy of the Daewoo Matiz (which is marketed in some countries as the Chevrolet Spark) and sued Chery in a Chinese court. The Detroit News reported that "the dispute reflects the confusion, risks and ambitions in China's new auto industry, where global carmakers are battling pugnacious upstarts for a piece of what may become the world's largest auto market."

The GM China Group indicated the two vehicles "shared remarkably identical body structure, exterior design, interior design and key components". MotorAuthority.com and GM executives demonstrated the extent of the design duplication, noting for example that the doors of the QQ and those of the Spark are interchangeable.

The Chery has always denied copying the design, stating that they paid to acquire it. While it seems likely that Chery somehow obtained the design, it is entirely possible that they did not pay Daewoo.

=== Safety ===
Though the Chery QQ and the Daewoo Matiz are superficially similar cars, their safety ratings differ dramatically.

==== Euro NCAP ====
A Euro NCAP front offset crash test showed that the driver's injuries in the QQ are worse than those sustained in the Matiz. Upon impact, the QQ driver will most likely suffer severe (possibly fatal) head trauma, and trauma to the neck and chest areas. The first generation Daewoo Matiz achieved a three/two star driver/passenger Euro NCAP rating.

==== South Africa ====
The South African version of the QQ3 with no airbags and no ABS received 0 stars for adult occupants and 0 stars for infants from Global NCAP 1.0 in 2017 (similar to Latin NCAP 2013).

Global NCAP 1.0 test results (South Africa) Chery QQ3 – No Airbags (2017, similar to Latin NCAP 2013)
Test	Score	Stars
Adult occupant protection	0.06/17.00	0 /5 stars
Child occupant protection	2.00/49.00	0 /5 stars

=== Engine ===
The QQ is available with three gasoline-powered engines (both EURO III compliant):

- 0.8 L SQR372 DOHC 12V I3 — 38 kW (51 hp) at 6,000 rpm, 70 N⋅m (52 lb⋅ft) at 3,500 rpm
- 1.1 L DA465Q-1A2/D SOHC 16V I4 — 38.5 kW (52 hp) at 5,300 rpm, 83 N⋅m (61 lb⋅ft) at 3,000 rpm
- 1.1 L SQR472F DOHC 16V I4 — 50 kW (67 hp) at 6,000 rpm, 90 N⋅m (66 lb⋅ft) at 3,500 rpm

=== QQ3 EV (electric version) ===
An all-electric version, the Chery QQ3 EV, began deliveries to retail customers in Wuhu, Anhui province in March 2010. The electric city car has a range of 100 km (62 mi). The QQ3 EV was the lowest priced pure electric car in China, at CN¥40,000 (~US$6,480) after government incentives.

The QQ3 EV was the top selling new energy car in China between 2011 and 2013, with 2,167 units sold in 2011, 3,129 in 2012, and 5,727 in 2013. The QQ3 EV was surpassed in 2014 by the BYD Qin plug-in hybrid as the top selling new energy car in the country. Cumulative sales between January 2011 and June 2015 reached 22,097 units.

A new model based on the Chery QQ3 Sport with a 16 hp (12 kW) electric motor was expected to be launched by the end of 2012. In the United States, Miles Electric Vehicles was planning to release the rebadged version of the QQ3 EV called the Miles ZX50S AD in 2012.

=== Global markets ===
The QQ is available in a number of export markets including Pakistan, Philippines (called QQ3), Singapore, Sri Lanka, South Africa (QQ3), Thailand and Vietnam.

In Iran, Iran Khodro reached an agreement to produce the Chery QQ domestically in 2006, and it is marketed there as the MVM 110. It is offered with two engine options, a 3-cylinder 0.8 liter and a 4-cylinder 1.1 liter.

In Iran, production of the QQ followed a 2002 decision from GM to stop supplying Kerman Khodro with Daewoo Matiz knock-down kits. Daewoo cars had been assembled by the company since 1997, but this Korean automaker stopped exporting to Iran after being acquired by GM in 2002.It is offered with two engine options, a 3-cylinder 0.8 liter and a 4-cylinder 1.1 liter. Quest Motor Corporation is also assembling the Chery QQ since some time in the year 2011.

As of 2006, the QQ is being sold in Malaysia, with the 0.8 L (812 cc) engine producing 52 hp at 6,000 rpm and a max torque of 75.5 Nm between 3,500 and 4,000rpm.

In 2012, the model received a facelift and was sold in its home market as the QQ3 Sport. With some inspiration from the 2008 Kia Morning/Picanto, the front and rear ends were completely redesigned. It mounted a new, more efficient 1.0L engine (SQR371F), a black interior with silver-painted inserts and a darker bi-color upholstery.

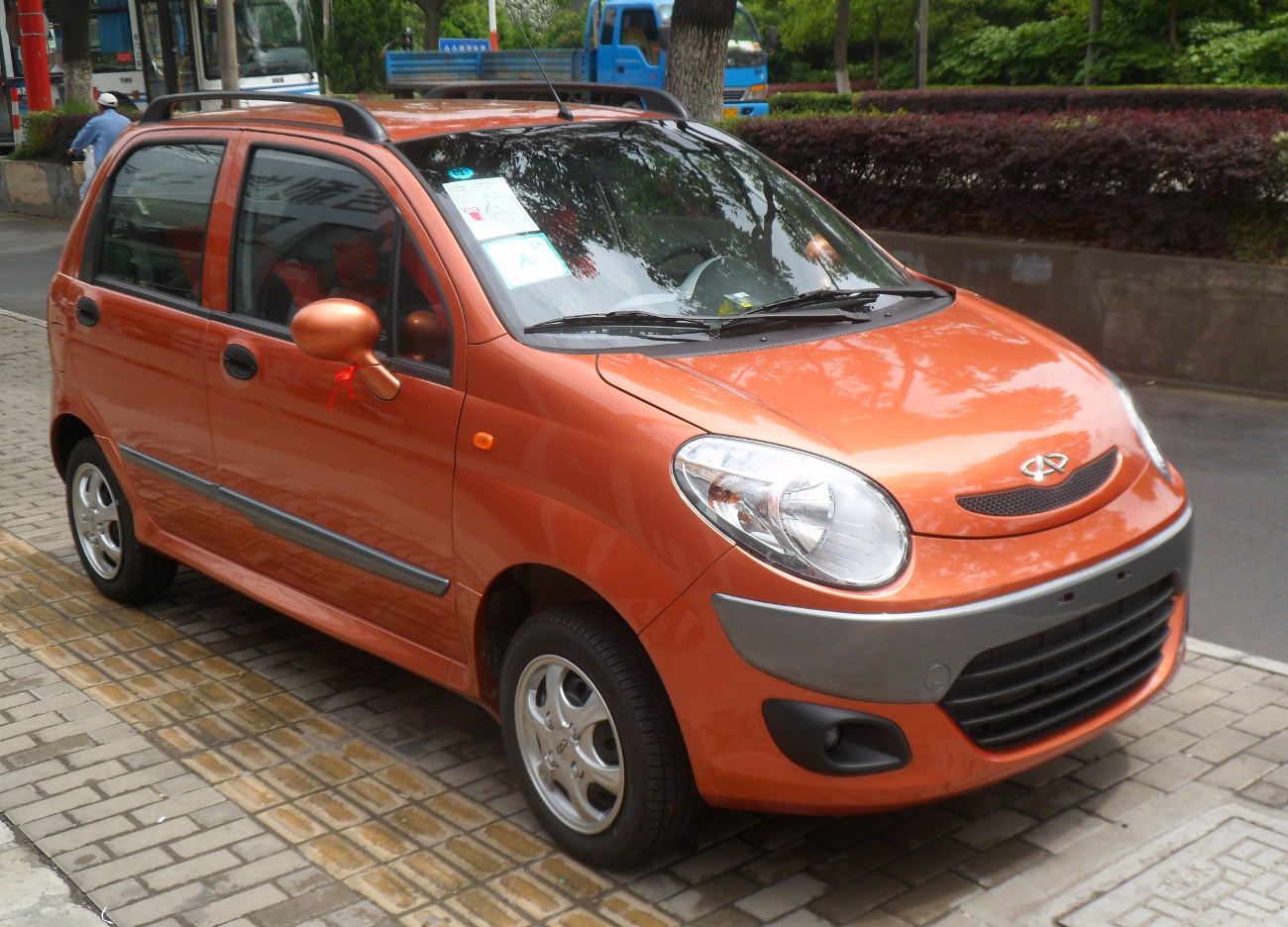
Chery QQ3 Sport 2012 (facelift)

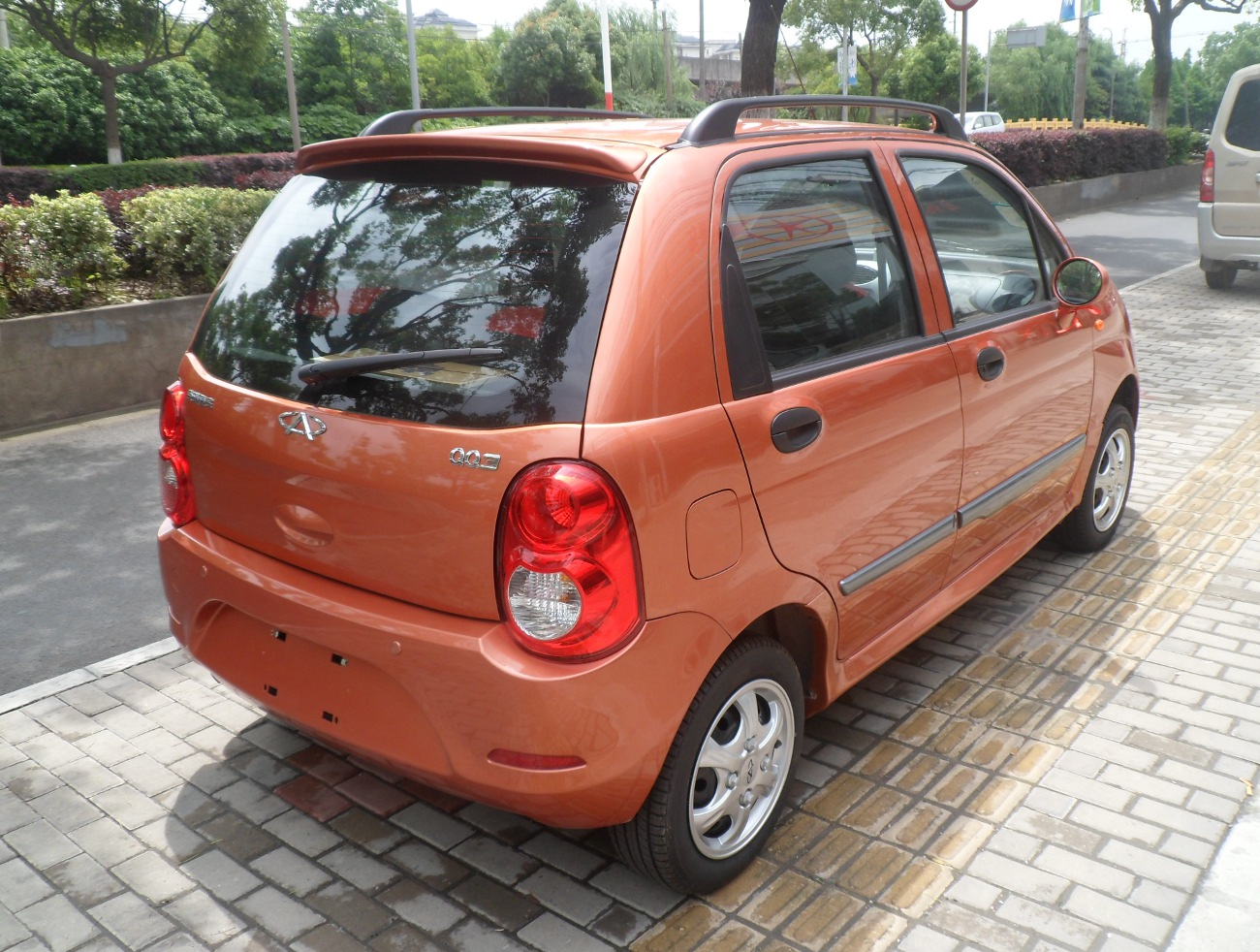
Rear view

== Second generation (2013) ==
Second generation (S15)
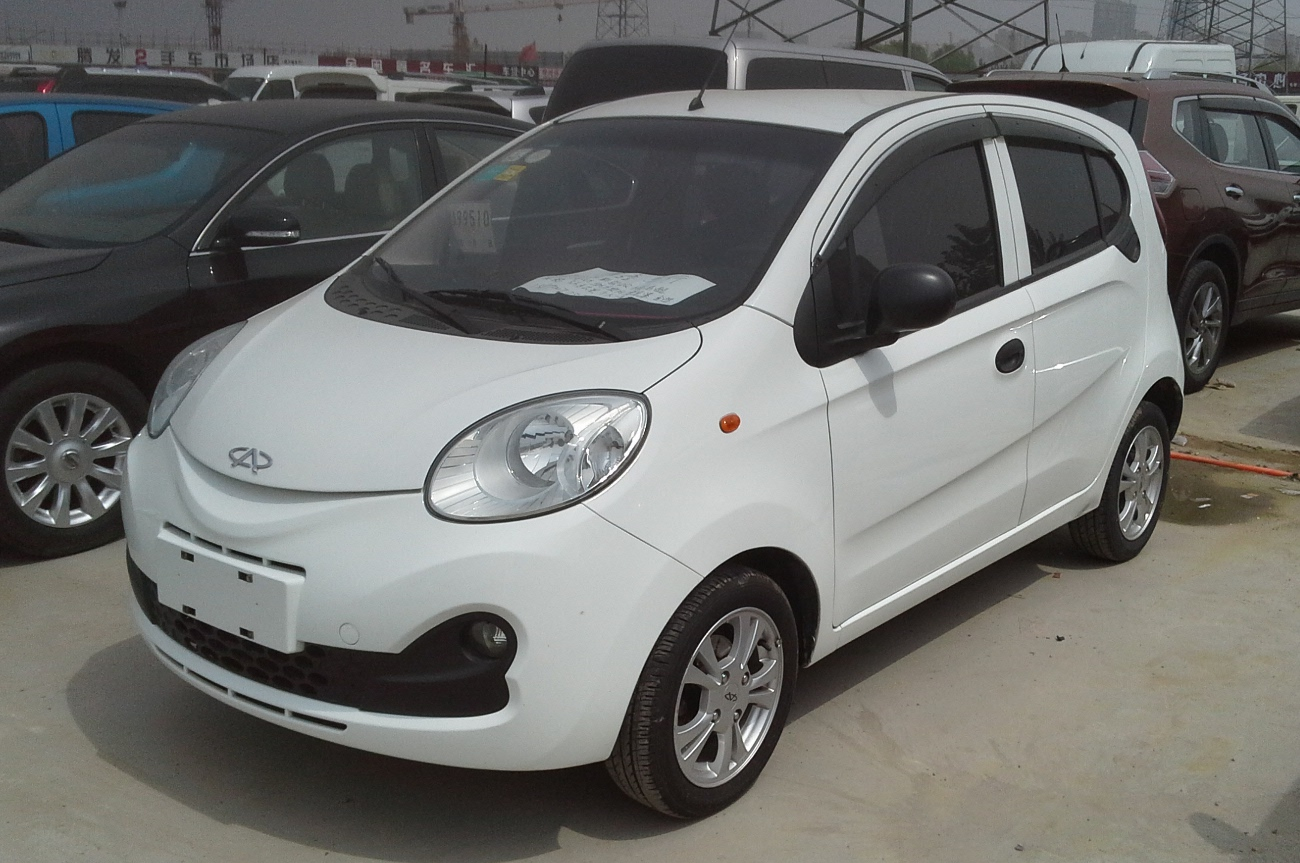

Overview
- Also called: DR Zero (Italy); Chery eQ (electric version); Chery iQ (Chile); Chery Arauca (Venezuela); MVM 110S (Iran)
- Production: 2013–2022
- Assembly: China: Wuhu, Anhui; Brazil: Jacareí, São Paulo; Iran: Bam, Kerman Province (MVM, 2015–2018)
- Designer: Giuliano Biasio at Torino Design

Body and chassis
- Layout: Front-engine, front-wheel-drive
- Related: Riich M1; Chery eQ1

Powertrain
- Engine: 1.0 L SQR371F I3 (petrol)
- Transmission: 5-speed manual; 5-speed automated manual

Dimensions
- Wheelbase: 2,340 mm (92.1 in)
- Length: 3,564 mm (140.3 in)
- Width: 1,620 mm (63.8 in)
- Height: 1,527 mm (60.1 in)
- Curb weight: 936–945 kg (2,064–2,083 lb)

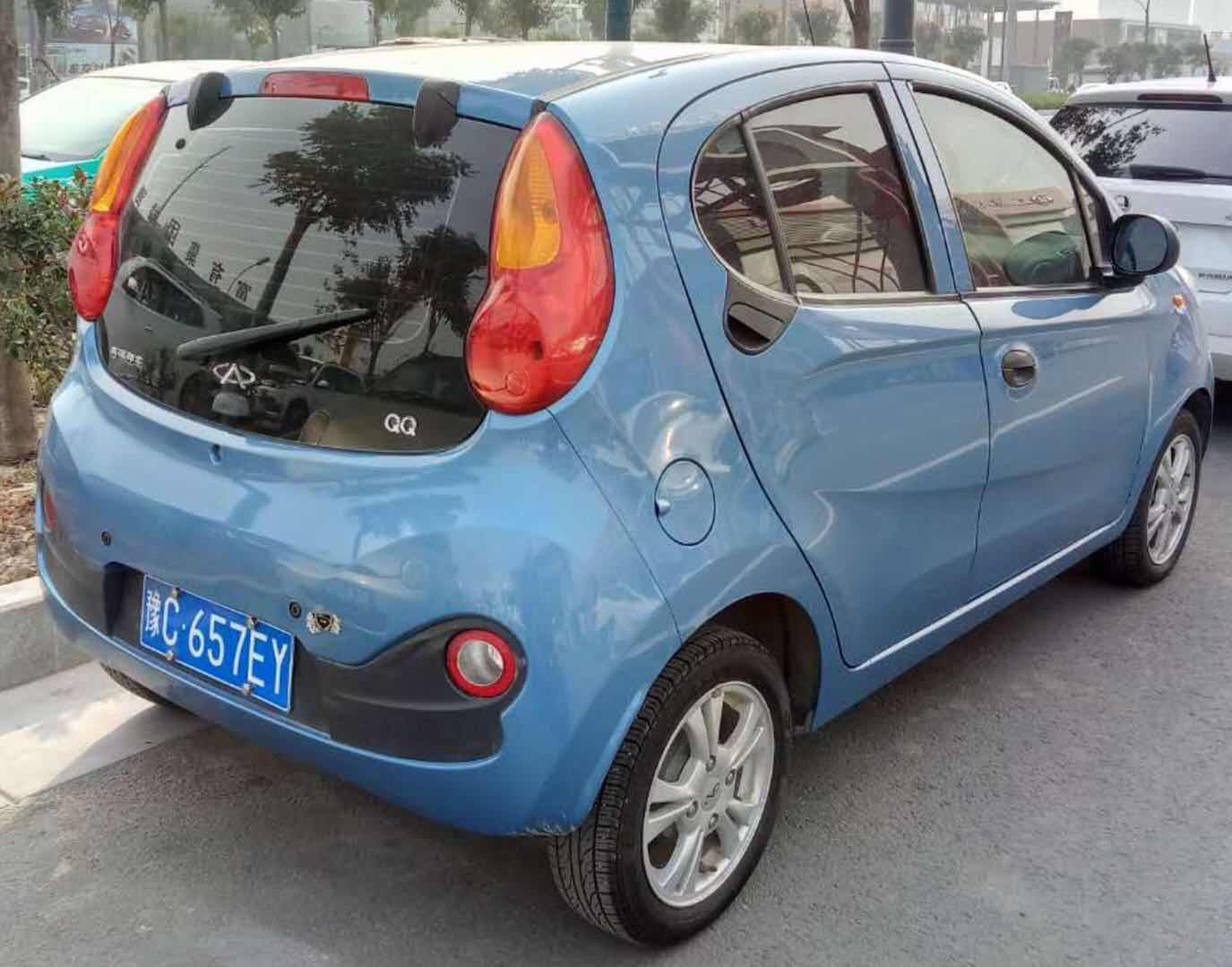
Rear view

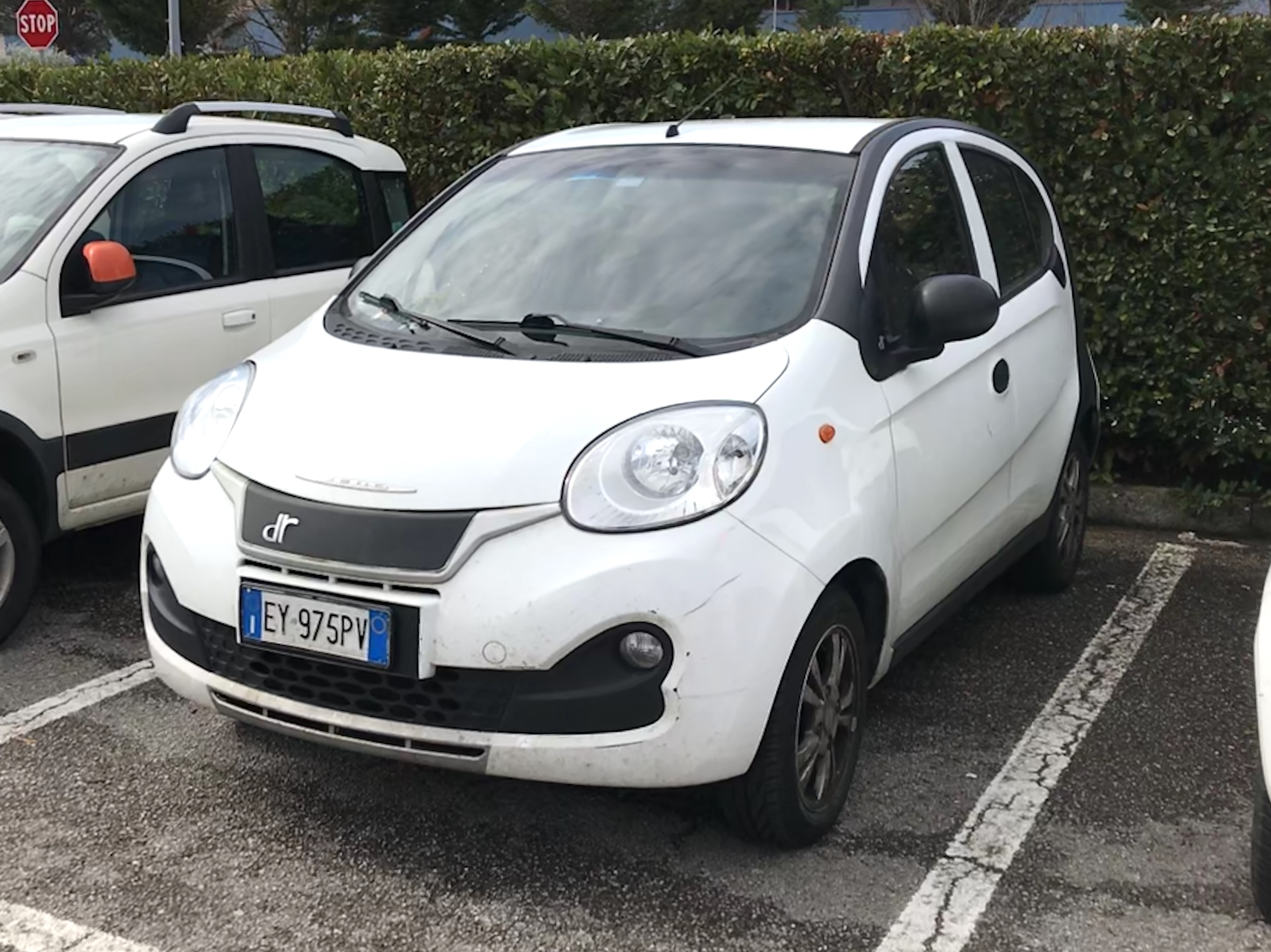
DR Zero

The second generation was launched at the Shanghai auto show in 2013 and was based on a modified platform of the previous generation. The engine is a 1.0L I3 petrol derived from the 0.8L of the first QQ, for the export market (like South America) the QQ used a 1.0L flex fuel version. From 2015 the Chery QQ was imported in Italy by DR Automobiles and rebadged as a DR Zero.

Codenamed "S15", this long-awaited redesign hit its home market in March 2013. It is based in a slightly larger QQ3-based platform, with bigger 14' inch wheels as standard and several mechanical improvements, sharing many of its components with previous models of the brand, like the A1 and the Riich M1, as a way to reduce development costs and simplify its assembly process, following a similar strategy to what was done in the Toyota Aygo/Citroën C1/Peugeot 107 line-up (which the new QQ looks similar to by the way). A good example of this can be seen on the back of the car, where an enlarged glass replaces the rear door seen on the previous model. The interior habitability, design and materials were also improved, introducing for the very first time customisable upholstery and dashboard accents.

The 1,000,000th Chery QQ was built on 1 September 2013, cumulative production include first and second generation, sedan QQ6 and the QQme.

=== Safety ===
The Chinese—made iQ in its most basic Latin American market configuration with no airbags and no ABS received 0 stars for adult occupants and 0 stars for toddlers from Latin NCAP 1.0 in 2015.

Latin NCAP 1.5 test results Chery iQ - NO Airbags (2015, similar to Euro NCAP 2002)
Test	Points	Stars
Adult occupant:	0.00/17.0	0 /5 stars
Child occupant:	3.00/49.00	1 /5 stars

=== Chery eQ (electric version) ===
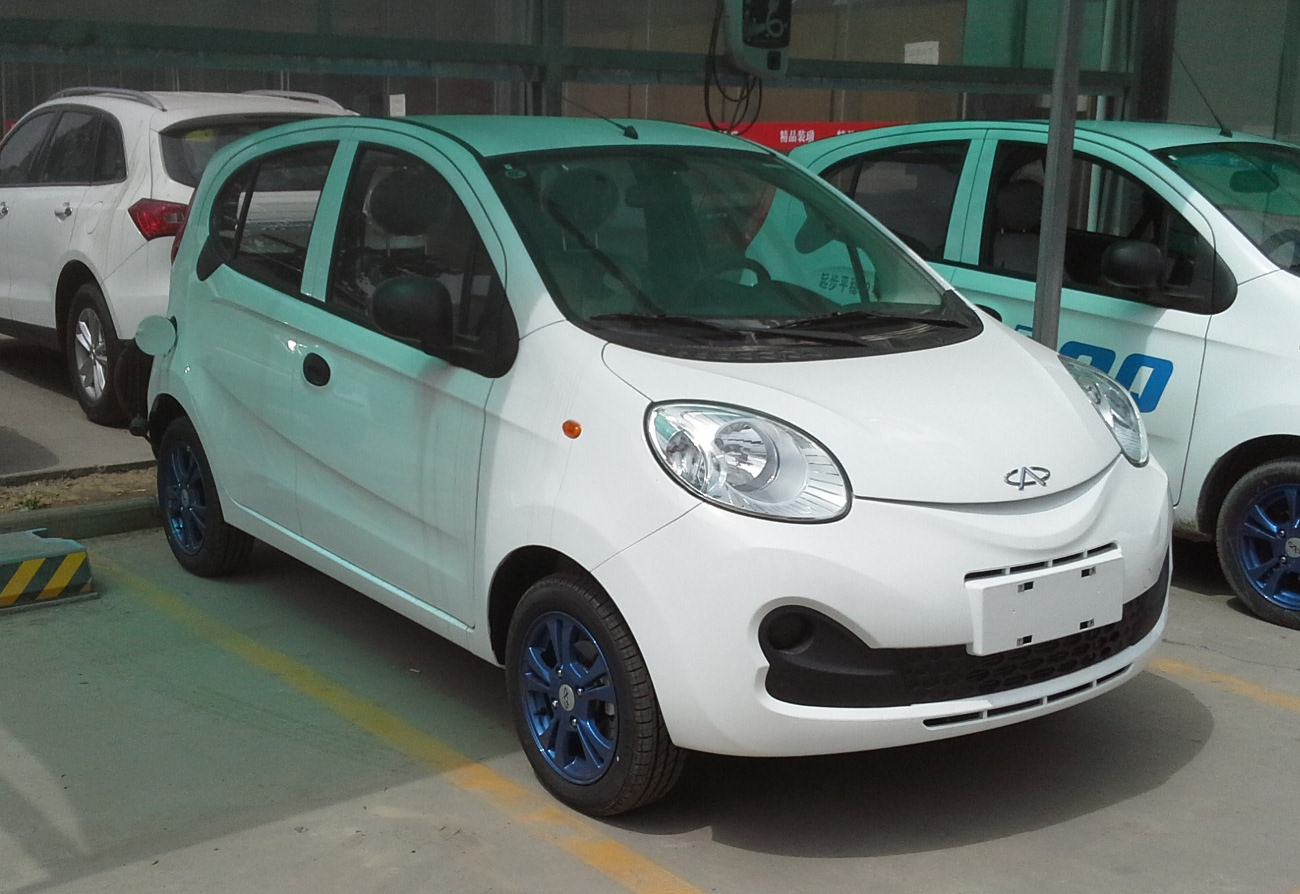
Chery eQ

The Chery eQ is a full-electric minicar based on the new generation QQ, was launched in the Chinese car market in November 2014. Pricing starts at CN¥59.800 (~US$9,600) after all government incentives for new energy vehicles, making the eQ one of the cheapest electric cars available in country. The electric motor delivers 57 hp and 150 nm powered by a lithium-ion battery. The eQ has a range of 200 km (120 mi), and charging takes 8–10 hours for a full charge on 220 V. A total of 542 units were sold in the country in 2014, and cumulative sales totaled 2,671 units through June 2015.

== Third generation (2026) ==
Third generation
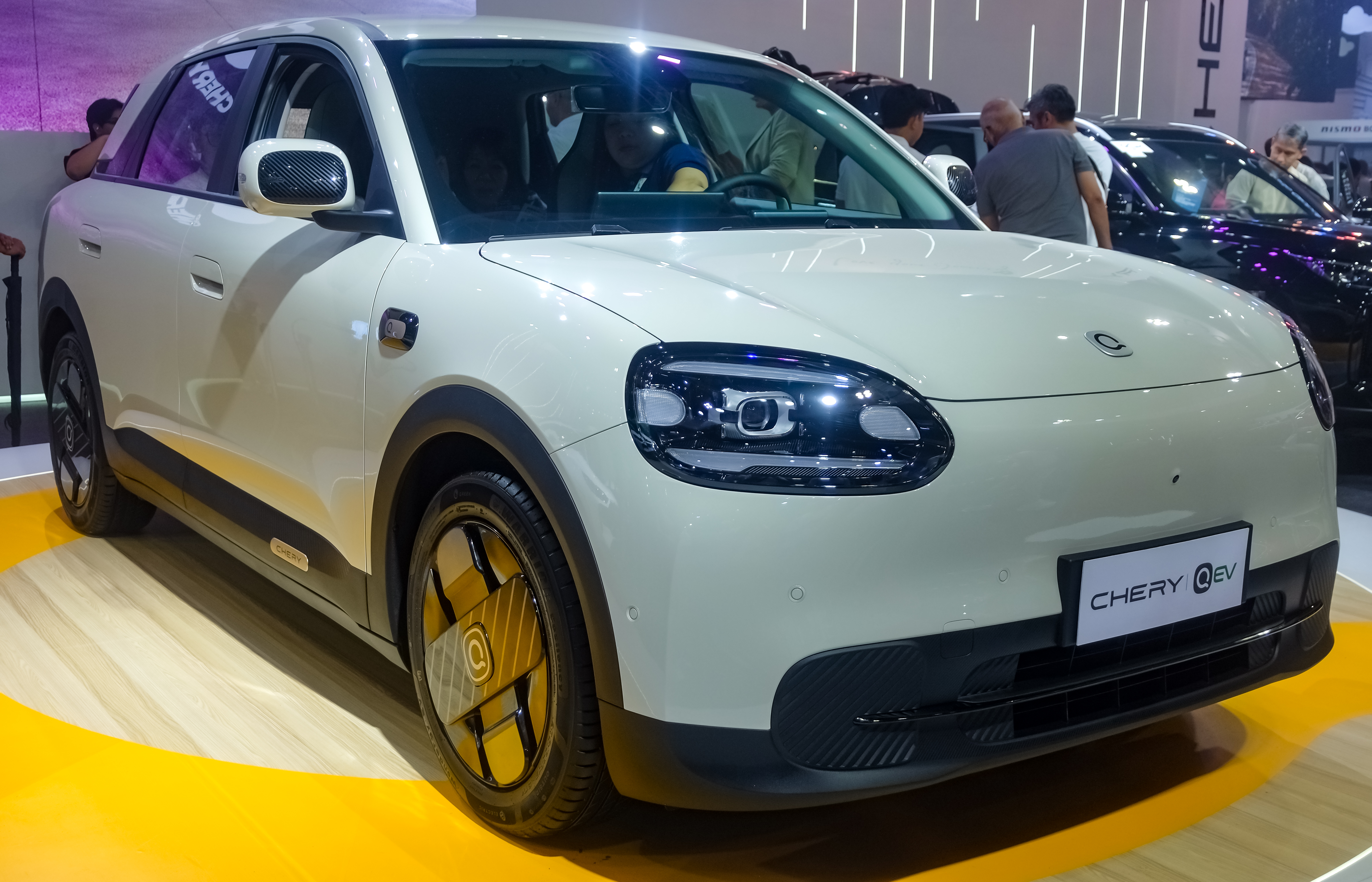

Overview
- Also called: Chery Q (export)
- Production: January 2026 – present
- Assembly: China: Wuhu, Anhui; Indonesia: Bekasi, West Java (HIM)
- Designer: Under the lead of Pierre Fengyou Gong

Body and chassis
- Layout: Rear-motor, rear-wheel-drive
- Platform: S5X-1

Powertrain
- Electric motor: 58 kW TZ180SMXB0 PMSM; 90 kW TZ180SMXB1 PMSM
- Power output: 78–121 hp (58–90 kW; 79–123 PS)
- Battery: 29.5 kWh LFP Gotion; 41.3 kWh LFP Gotion; 42.7 kWh LFP Gotion
- Electric range: 310–420 km (193–261 mi) (CLTC); 280–405 km (174–252 mi) (NEDC)

Dimensions
- Wheelbase: 2,700 mm (106.3 in)
- Length: 4,195 mm (165.2 in)
- Width: 1,811 mm (71.3 in)
- Height: 1,569 mm (61.8 in)
- Curb weight: 1,275 kg (2,811 lb)

In August 2025 at Chengdu Auto Show, the third-generation QQ3 made its official debut. Unlike the previous two generations of the QQ3 which were city cars, the third-generation QQ3 is a subcompact hatchback with a wheelbase of 2,700 mm (106.3 in). The vehicle will be built on Chery's T12 battery electric platform and equipped with the Falcon 500 intelligent driving system. Presales of the model opened on 10 March 2026, which reached a total of 35,689 units within a week, with the launch date of 30 March.

Chery says the QQ3's chassis consists of 82% high-strength steel and 16% hot-formed steel. It has a multilink rear suspension and a turning radius of 5.2 m (17 ft).

The interior features a 15.6-inch 2.5K resolution infotainment display powered by a Snapdragon 8155 SoC, which supports Carplay, HiCar, and ICCOA Carlink. It has heated and cooled seats and is available with black or Jungle Green upholstery. The rear cargo area, equipped with a power liftgate, is 375 L (13.2 cu ft) and expands to 1,450 L (51 cu ft) with the seats folded down, and is supplemented by a 70 L (2.5 cu ft) frunk and 35 L (1.2 cu ft) of storage space in drawers located underneath the rear seats.

The QQ3 is equipped with Chery's Falcon 500 ADAS system powered by the Horizon Robotics J6E SoC, capable of semiautonomous driving on highways.

At the 2026 Chengdu Auto Show, Chery released the QQ3 Modern Edition, a retro-styled variant of the QQ3. It features a unique retro lower air intake, retro disc style wheels, white decals including racing stripes, and chrome accents. Additionally, the interior features houndstooth patterned seat upholstery with contrasting panels and a velvet headliner.

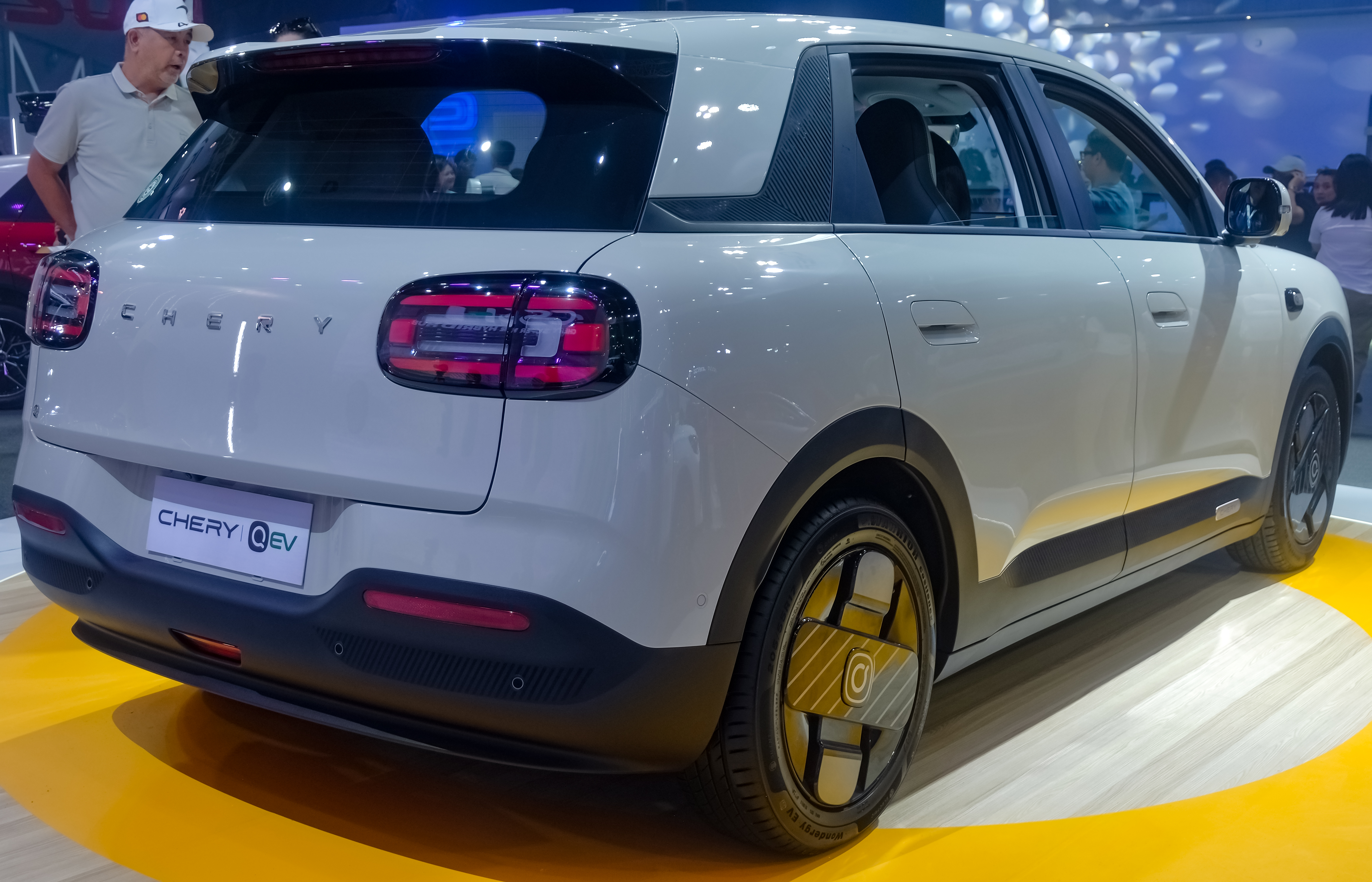
Rear view

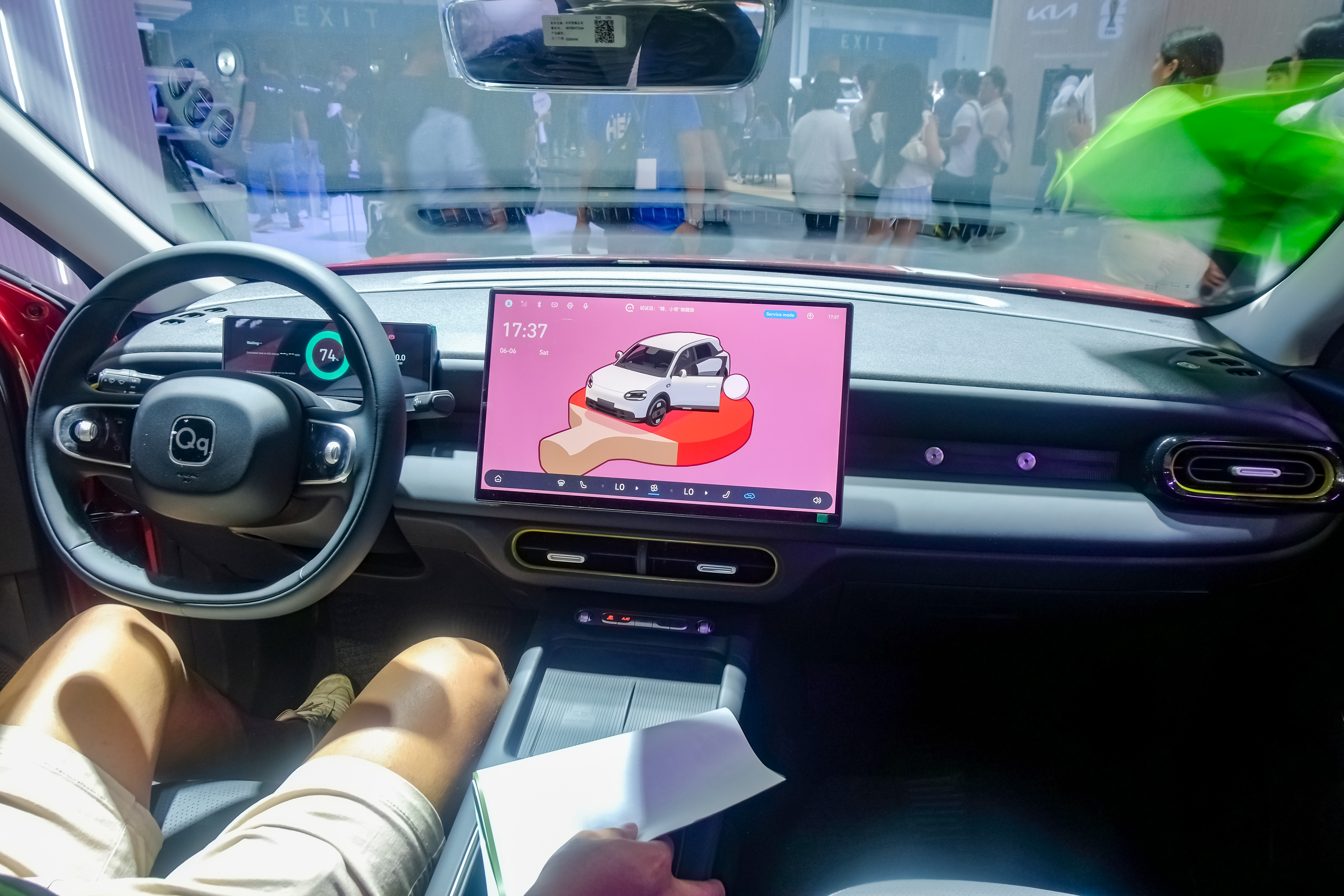
Interior

=== Powertrain ===
It is equipped with an LFP battery pack supplied by Gotion with 29.5 or 41.3 kWh capacities, providing CLTC ranges of 310 or 420 km (193 or 261 mi), respectively. Both battery packs can be charged from 30–80% in 16.5 minutes. It comes with a choice of two rear-wheel drive motors, 78 hp (58 kW; 79 PS) and 90 N⋅m (66 lb⋅ft) of torque, or 121 hp (90 kW; 123 PS) and 115 N⋅m (85 lb⋅ft) of torque equipped on the larger battery model. It has a top speed 125 km/h (78 mph).

Battery		Power	Torque	Range		Top speed
Type	Weight	Power	Torque	CLTC	NEDC	Top speed
29.6 kWh LFP Gotion	243 kg (536 lb)	78 hp (58 kW; 79 PS)	90 N⋅m (66 lb⋅ft)	310 km (193 mi)	280 km (174 mi)	125 km/h (78 mph)
41.3 kWh LFP Gotion	323 kg (712 lb)	121 hp (90 kW; 123 PS)	115 N⋅m (85 lb⋅ft)	420 km (261 mi)	405 km (252 mi)	135 km/h (84 mph)
42.7 kWh LFP Gotion	325 kg (717 lb)	121 hp (90 kW; 123 PS)	115 N⋅m (85 lb⋅ft)	420 km (261 mi)	405 km (252 mi)	135 km/h (84 mph)

=== Markets ===
==== Indonesia ====
In Indonesia, the Chery Q was unveiled during the grand final of Indonesian Idol season 14 aired on RCTI on 18 May 2026, which was the main prize for the winner and second place. It was launched on 31 July 2026 at the 33rd Gaikindo Indonesia International Auto Show, with two variants: Pure and Rizz, powered by the 42.7 kWh LFP Gotion battery pack.

==== Philippines ====
The Chery Q was launched in the Philippines on 4 June 2026 at the 2026 Philippine International Motor Show. It is available in the sole variant powered by the 42.7 kWh LFP Gotion battery pack.

==== South Africa ====
The Chery Q was launched in South Africa on 28 August 2026, with two variants: Comfort and Elite, powered by the 42.7 kWh LFP Gotion battery pack.

==== Thailand ====
The Chery Q was launched in 24 June 2026, with three variants: Qlick, Qool and Quint, all variants powerd by the 41.3 kWh LFP Gotion battery pack.

== Sales ==
At its launch on 30 March 2026, the third generation QQ3 accumulated 56,879 orders within 2 hours, including pre-orders which opened on 10 March 2026.
