= Chery QQ6 =

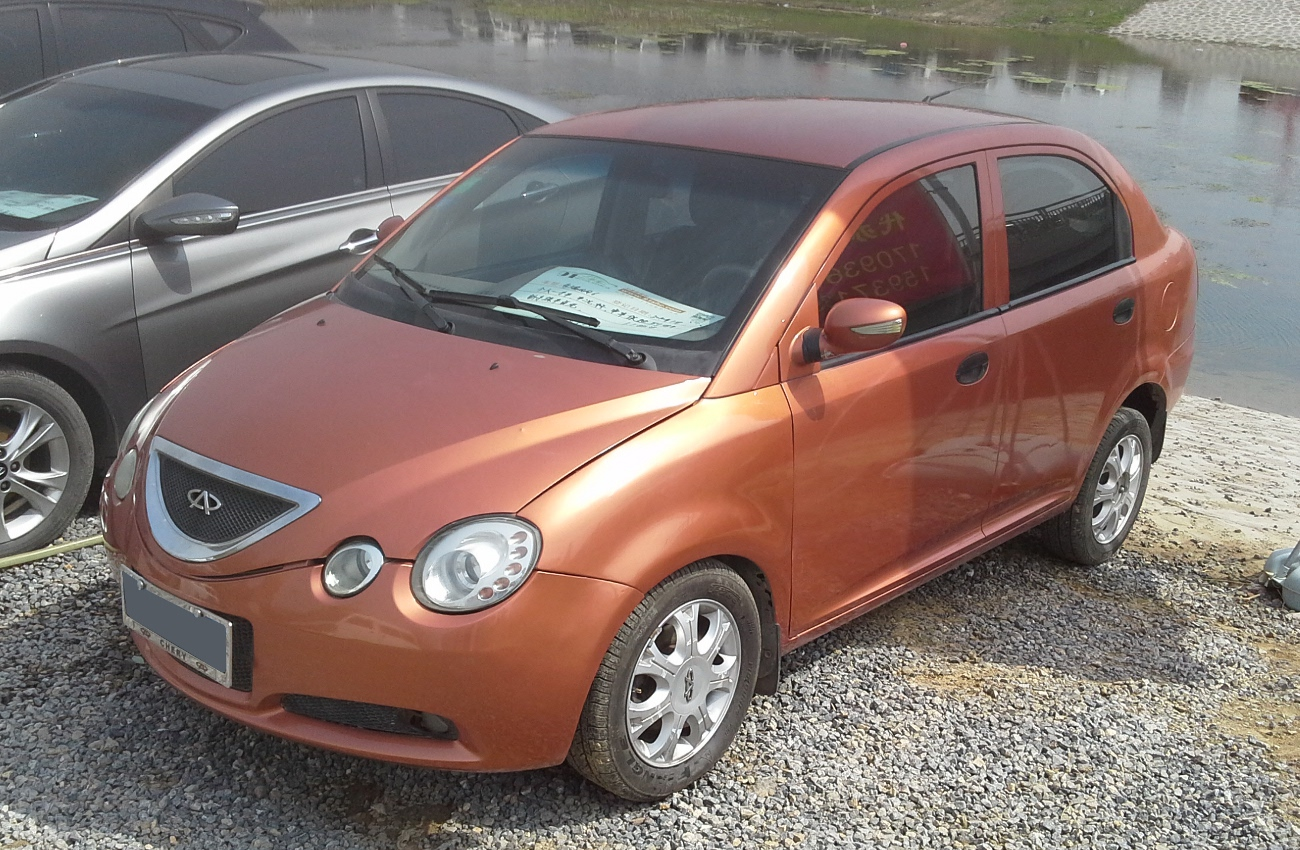

Overview
- Manufacturer: Chery
- Also called: Chery Cowin 1 Chery Jaggi (Ukraine); Chery S21 (South America); Speranza A213 (Egypt)
- Production: 2006–2010
- Assembly: Wuhu, Anhui, China; Cairo, Egypt (Speranza)

Body and chassis
- Class: City car
- Body style: 4-door sedan
- Related: Chery QQ3

Powertrain
- Engine: 1.1 L SQR472F I4; 1.3 L SQR473F I4
- Transmission: 5-speed manual

Dimensions
- Wheelbase: 2,340 mm (92.1 in)
- Length: 3,998 mm (157.4 in)
- Width: 1,640 mm (64.6 in)
- Height: 1,535 mm (60.4 in)
- Curb weight: 990 kg (2,183 lb)–1,050 kg (2,315 lb)

The Chery QQ6 (codename S21) is a city car produced by the Chinese manufacturer Chery. It is a four-door sedan which is based on a platform self-developed by Chery. Chery discontinued the QQ6 in 2010. A facelifted variant of the QQ6 was known as the Cowin 1 and was sold from 2010 to 2013.

== Style & Body description ==
The QQ6 was designed to appeal to younger buyers with its rounded body. The interior is particularly arranged for comfort during long journeys.

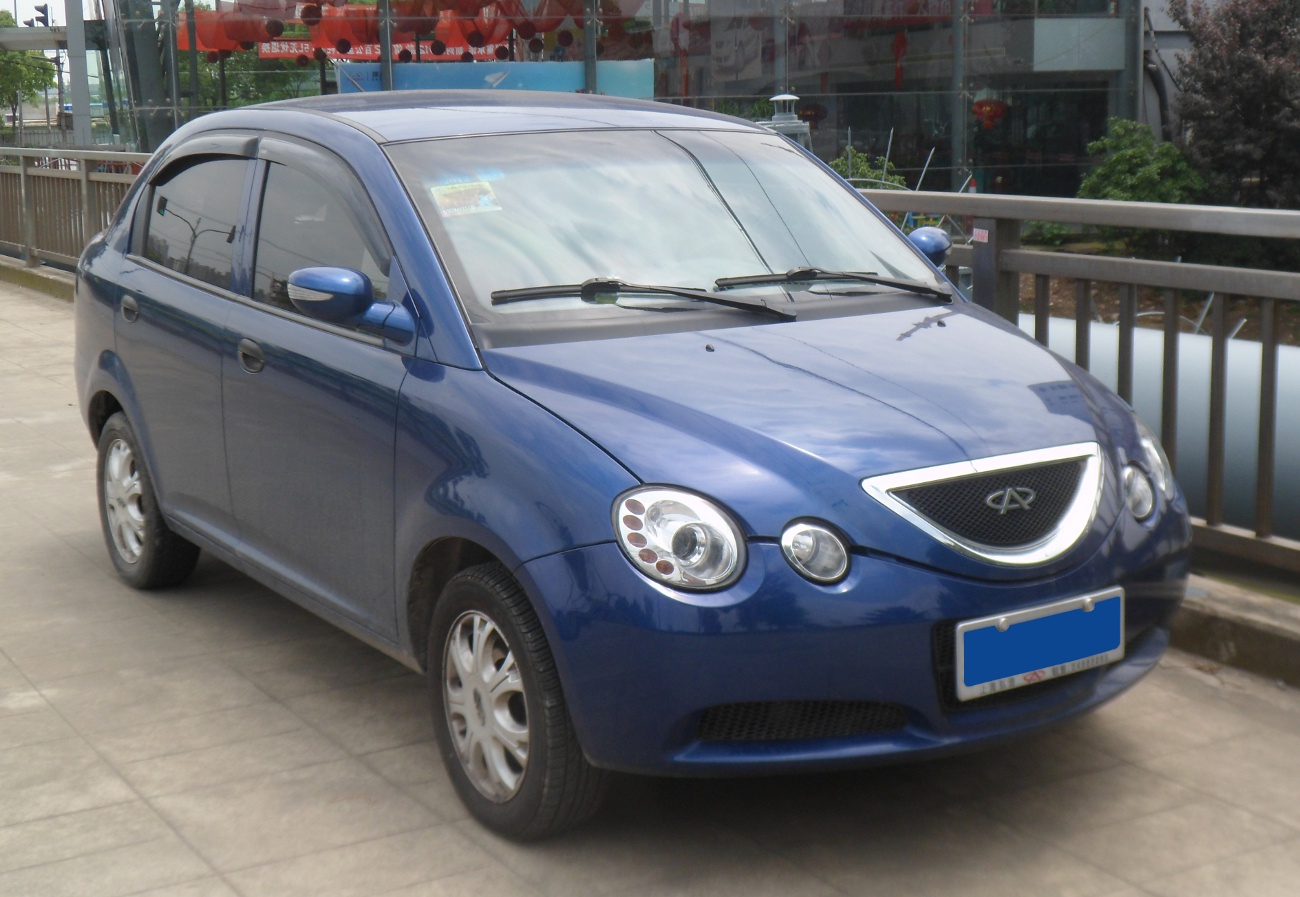
Chery QQ6 front.

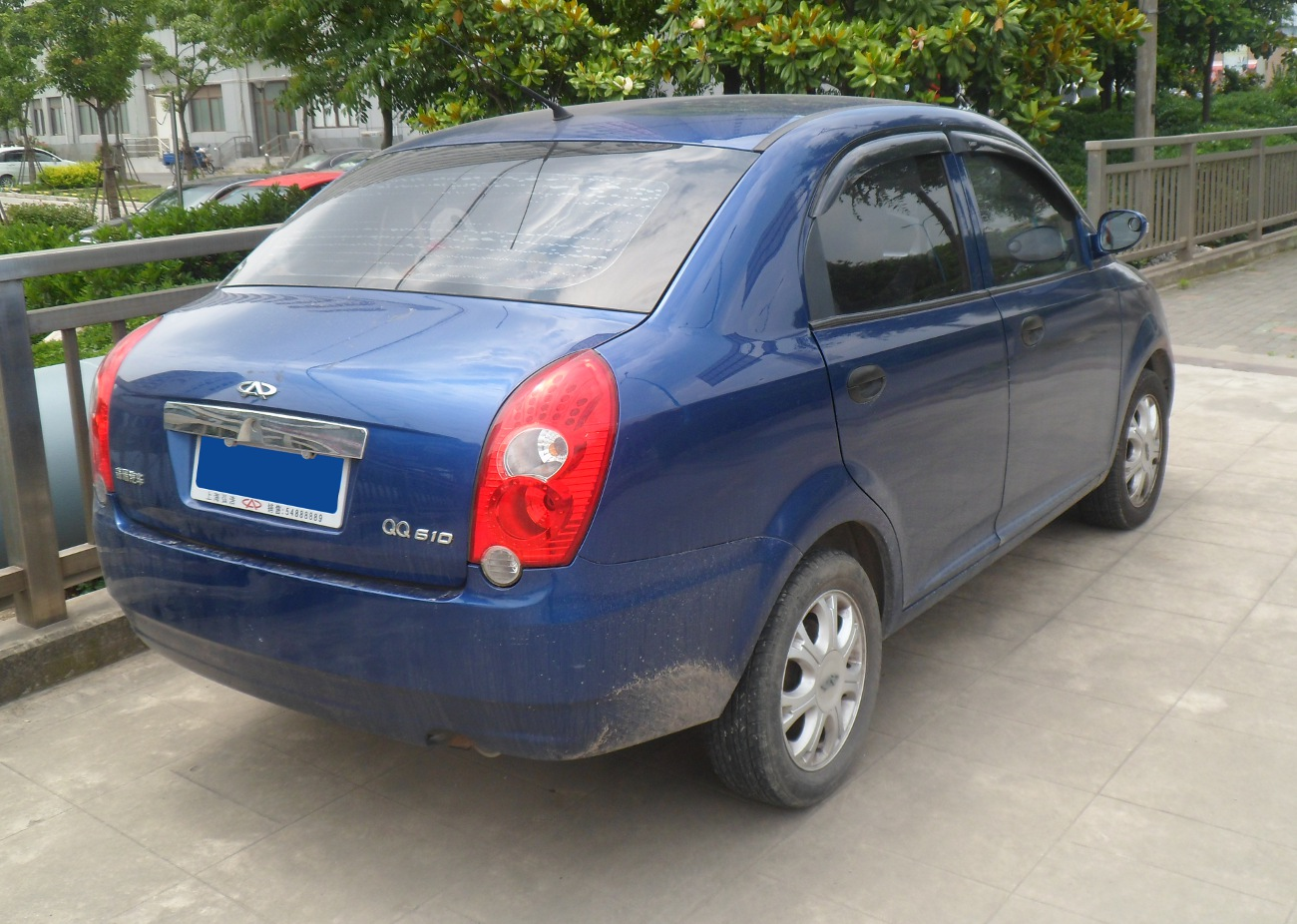
Chery QQ6 rear.

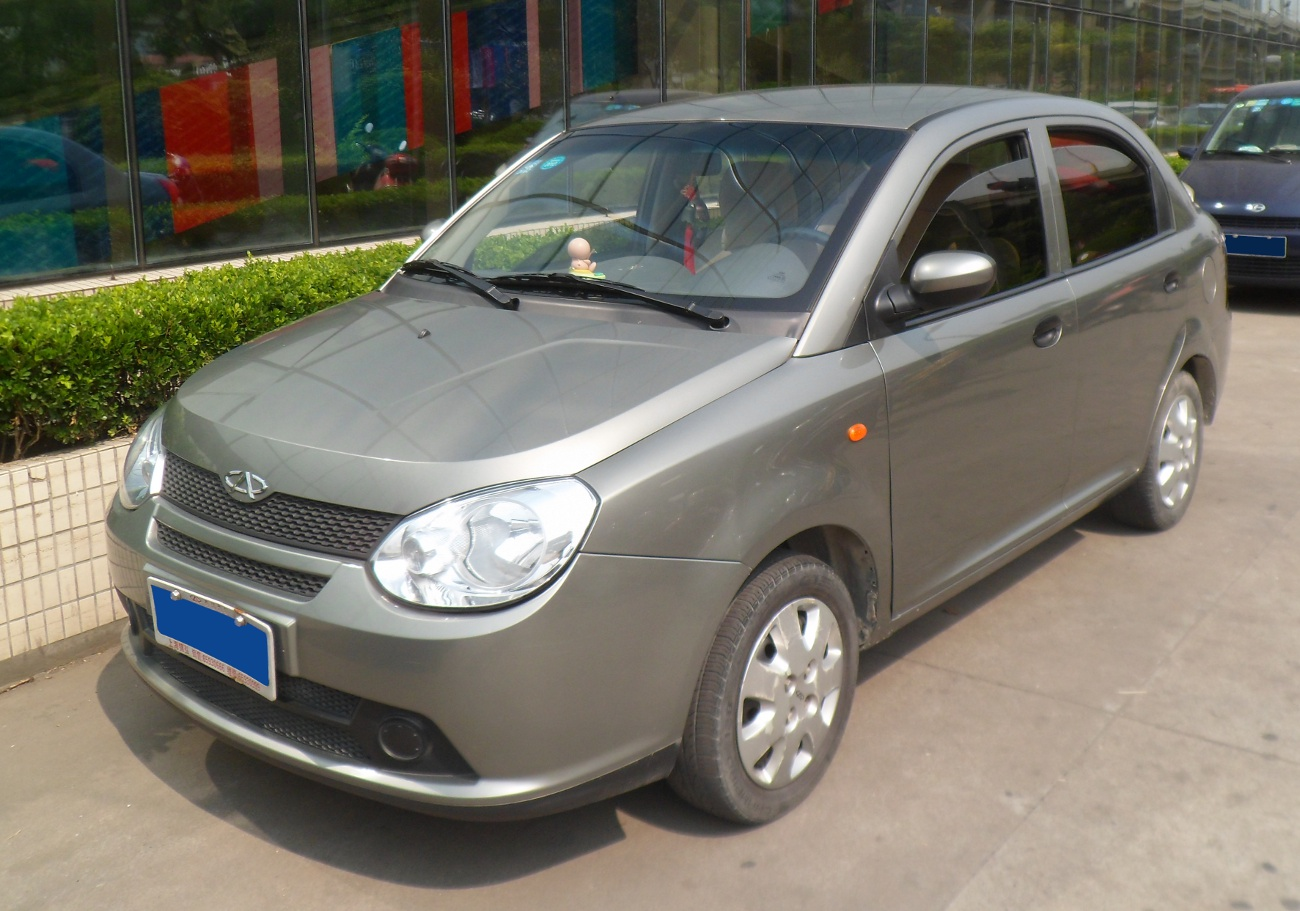
Chery Cowin 1 front.

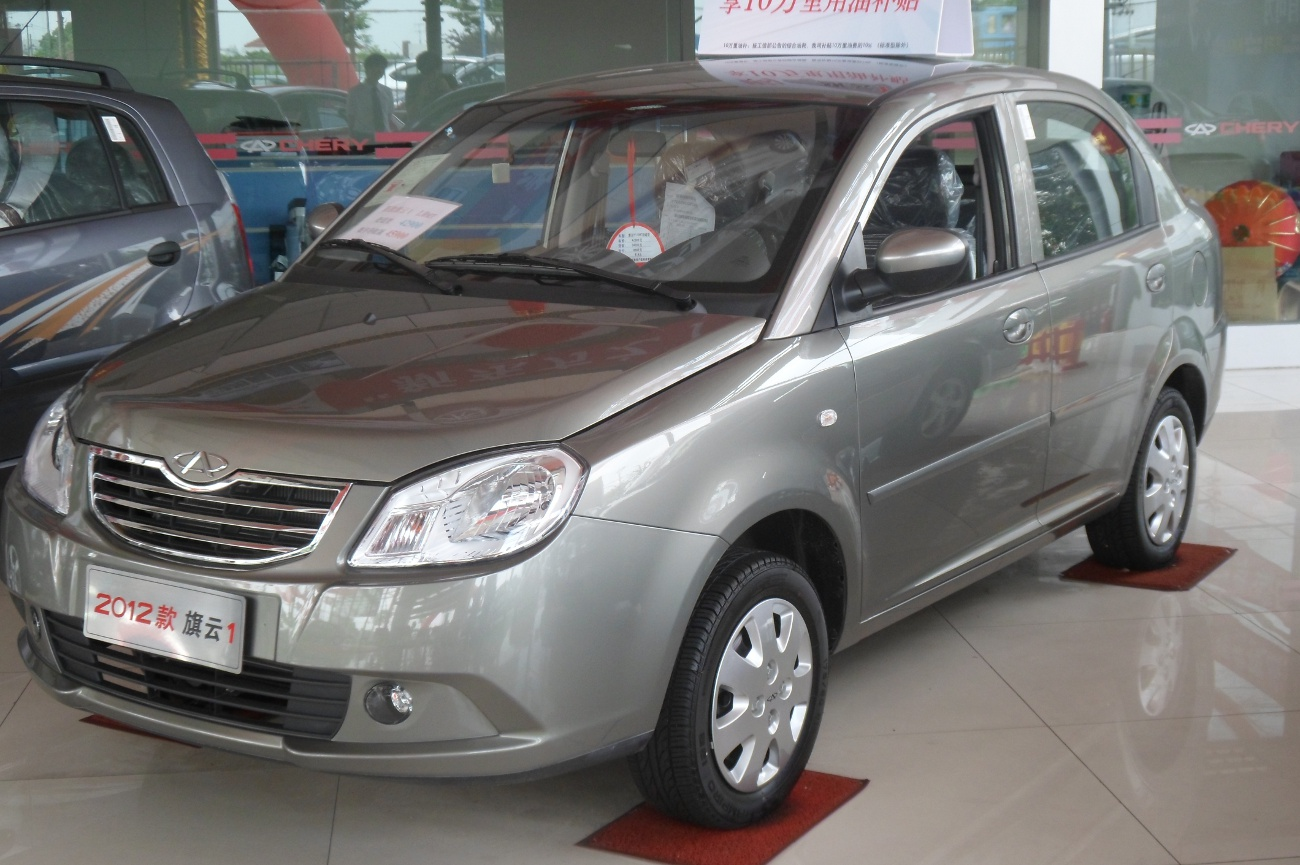
Chery Cowin 1 facelift.

== Mechanical description ==
The QQ6 is offered with a 1,297 cc 61 kW (83 PS; 82 hp) four-cylinder 16V DOHC engine or with a 1,083 cc 50 kW (68 PS; 67 hp) unit, of the same configuration as its bigger sister.

== Safety ==
The car was awarded 2 out of 5 stars in the CNCAP due to low protection in the crash tests.

== Marketing outside China ==
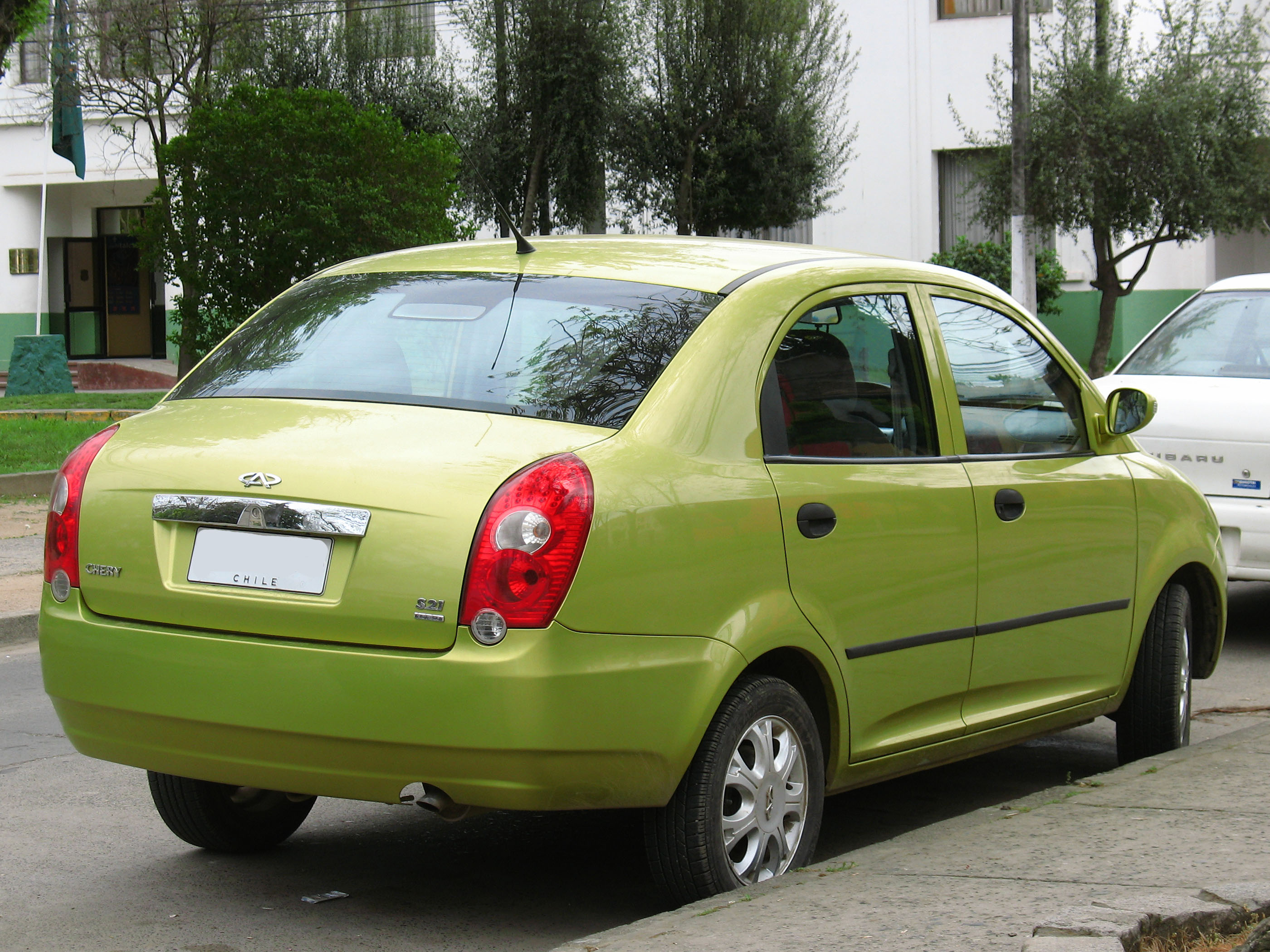
Rear view of an S21 (Chile)

The car was launched in Chile, Colombia and other Andean countries in November 2006, where it is badged as the same designation from factory, minus Chile, when is sold as the S21. This model offers the 1.1 litre engine (SQR472F). It is also assembled in Egypt as the Speranza A213. It has also been sold in Ukraine as the "Chery Jaggi".
