= Air (disambiguation) =

Air is the name given to the atmosphere of Earth.

Air or AIR may also refer to:

== Arts, entertainment, and media ==
=== Art ===
- Air (Maillol), a sculpture by Aristide Maillol
- Air (painting), by Jan van Kessel the Elder

=== Films ===
- Air (2005 film), an anime adaptation of the visual novel
- Air (2015 film), an American post-apocalyptic film
- Air (2023 American film), an American biographical sports drama
- Air (2023 Russian film), a Russian aviation film
- "Love is destructive", known in Japan as "Air", the first half of the 1997 anime film The End of Evangelion

=== Music ===
==== Groups ====
- Air (French band), a French electronic music duo
- Air (free jazz trio), founded in 1971
- Air (jazz rock band), a jazz rock group featuring Tom and Googie Coppola
- Air (singer), Japanese singer

==== Albums ====
- Air (Cecil Taylor album), 1960
- Air (Agua de Annique album), 2007
- Air (Astronoid album), 2016
- Air (Sault album), 2022
- Air (EP), by Yeji, 2025
- Air, by Air (jazz rock band), 1971
- Air, by Pete Namlook, 1993
- Air, by Kym, 2005
- Air, by Andreas Vollenweider, 2009
- AIR, an EP by Afgan, 2019

==== Songs ====
- "Air" (Tyson Ritter song), 2013
- "Air" (Marcus & Martinus song), 2023
- "Air" (Yeji song), 2025
- "Air", in the musical Hair
- "Air", Air on the G String, by Ekseption from their self-titled 1969 album Ekseption
- "Air", by Brian Eno and Talking Heads from the 1979 album Fear of Music
- "Air", by Ben Folds Five from the 1998 soundtrack Godzilla: The Album
- "Air", by Frente! from the 1996 album Shape
- "Air", by Sault from the 2022 album Air
- "Air", by Shawn Mendes and Astrid S from the 2015 album Handwritten
- "Air", by Winner from the 2018 album Everyday
- "A.I.R.", by Anthrax from their 1985 album Spreading the Disease

==== Other music-related uses ====
- Air (music), a song-like vocal or instrumental composition
  - Air on the G String, August Wilhelmj's adaptation of an air by Johann Sebastian Bach
- Air de cour, secular vocal music in France in the late Renaissance and early Baroque period
- Air guitar, a form of dance and movement in which a performer pretends to play an imaginary guitar
- Associated Independent Recording (AIR), an independent recording company and recording studio based in London, UK
- Australian Independent Record Labels Association, organisation representing Australian-owned record labels and independent artists

=== Radio ===
- All India Radio, broadcast service in India
- Art International Radio, an arts-oriented radio station

=== Television ===
- AIR: America's Investigative Reports, PBS documentary series 2006–2007, retitled Exposé: America's Investigative Reports with second season in 2007
- "Air" (Stargate Universe), the series premiere of the television series Stargate Universe
- AIR: All India Rankers, 2025 Indian TV series
- The Air, 2026 Thailand TV series

=== Video games ===
- Air (video game), a 2000 Japanese visual novel
- Air, an air combat based mainframe computer game by Kelton Flinn

=== Other arts, entertainment, and media-related uses ===
- ABS-CBN International Report, a defunct international newscast of ABS-CBN Broadcasting Corporation
- A.I.R. Gallery, an all female artists cooperative gallery in the US
- Air, a common colloquialism for a broadcast ("on air")
- Air (comics), a comic book series published by the Vertigo imprint of DC Comics
- AIR (nightclub), a 2000 capacity superclub in Digbeth, Birmingham in the UK
- Air (novel), 2005, by Geoff Ryman
- Air (roller coaster), the former name of a flying roller coaster at Alton Towers theme park in the UK, now re-themed as Galactica
- Annals of Improbable Research, a bi-monthly magazine devoted to scientific humour
- Art Is Resistance, an organization in the game Year Zero

== Brands and organisations ==
- AIR Worldwide, an American risk modeling and data analytics company
- AAR Corporation (New York Stock Exchange ticker symbol AIR)
- Air Jordan, a popular brand of basketball shoes promoted by Retired Chicago Bulls Superstar, Michael Jordan
- American Institutes for Research, commonly abbreviated AIR, a social science research organization

== Computing and technology ==
- AIR (program), a program suite for medical image registration
- Adobe AIR, a cross-platform run-time system
- DJI Air, a Chinese camera drone
- iPhone Air, an Apple smartphone
- iPad Air, an Apple tablet
- MacBook Air, an Apple ultraportable laptop

== Places ==
- Aïr Mountains, a massif in northern Niger
- Sultanate of Agadez, also known as the Sultanate of Aïr
- Arab Islamic Republic, failed union attempt between Tunisia and Libya

== People ==
- Air Noland (born 2005), American football player
- Donna Air (born 1979), British actress
- Glen Air (born 1978), Australian rugby league player
- Michael Jordan, American basketball player nicknamed His Royal Airness
- Steve McNair, American football player nicknamed Air

== Science and healthcare ==
- Aminoimidazole ribotide
- Anterior interval release, a type of arthroscopic knee surgery
- Oxygen
- Gas or atmosphere of a planet
- The sky

== Sports ==
- Adelaide International Raceway, a car-racing circuit in Adelaide, South Australia
- Air, a range of boardsport tricks consisting of jumps without rotation
- "Airs" above the ground, a term used in dressage

== Technology ==
- Active Infrared, combines infrared illumination of spectral range 700–1,000 nm (just below the visible spectrum of the human eye) with CCD cameras sensitive to this light
- Air conditioning, any form of cooling, heating, ventilation or disinfection that modifies the condition of air
- Air injection reactor, a very early automobile emissions control system
- Air-to-air rocket or air interception rocket, an unguided projectile fired from aircraft to engage other flying targets
- Ampere interrupting rating, the maximum current a circuit breaker is capable of interrupting without damage

== Transportation ==
- Airbles railway station, in Motherwell, Scotland (National Rail code "AIR")
- AIR-X, a Soviet aircraft series by Yakovlev
- Airport station (MTR), Hong Kong (MTR station code "AIR")
- Lucid Air, a 2021–present American electric executive sedan
- Wuling Air EV, a 2022–present Chinese electric microcar

== Other uses ==
- Air (classical element), an element in ancient Greek philosophy and in Western alchemy
- Airoran language, an Indonesian language with ISO 639-3 code AIR
- Applied Innovative Research, a scientific journal
- Compressed air, the air kept under a pressure that is greater than atmospheric pressure
- Another word for ambience (character, mood, etc.)
- An historical slang term, chiefly US, for a breakup as in giving the other person space or separation

== See also ==
- Air University (disambiguation)
- Aiir (EP), by British band Sault, 2022
- Aire (disambiguation)
- AIRS (disambiguation)
- Ayr (disambiguation)
- Ayre, one of six sheadings in the Isle of Man
- Éire
- On air (disambiguation)
- On the Air (disambiguation)
