= List of medical abbreviations: A =

Sortable table
Abbreviation	Meaning
ā	(a with a bar over it) before (from Latin ante) before
A	assessment
a.a.	of each (from Latin ana ana) amino acids: A or Ala – alanine; C or Cys – cysteine; D or Asp – aspartic acid; E or Glu – glutamic acid; F or Phe – phenylalanine; H or His – histidine; I or Ile – isoleucine; K or Lys – lysine; L or Leu – leucine; M or Met – methionine; N or Asn – asparagine; O or Pyl – pyrrolysine; P or Pro – proline; Q or Gln – glutamine; R or Arg – arginine; S or Ser – serine; T or Thr – threonine; U or Sec – selenocysteine; V or Val – valine; W or Trp – tryptophan; Y or Tyr – tyrosine
A_{1C}	glycated hemoglobin (hemoglobin A1c)
Aa.	arteria, see Artery
Aag	abdominal aortic aneurysm (pronounced "triple-A")
AAD	antibiotic-associated diarrhea
AAI	acute arterial insufficiency
AAPMC	antibiotic-associated pseudomembranous colitis
AAT	activity as tolerated atypical antibody test
AAL	anterior axillary line
AAOx3	awake, alert, and oriented, times 3 (i.e., to person, place, and time)
AAOx4	awake, alert, and oriented, times 4 (i.e., to person, place, time, and event)
A/B	acid-base ratio
ab	abdomen, abdominal abortion
Ab	antibody
AB	abortion, AB (blood type)
ABC	airway, breathing, circulation aspiration biopsy cytology
ABCD	airway, breathing, circulation, disability asymmetry, borders, color, diameter (features on considering "Is it a malignant melanoma?"); ABCD rating (a staging system for prostate cancer)
ABCs; ABCDs; ABCDEs	airway, breathing, circulation, etc. Refers to priority of needs in emergency situations. Exact spell-out and details after "C" vary by institution, but the "ABCs" theme is recurrent.
Abd	abdomen abdominal abduction
ABD	army battle dressing
ABE	acute bacterial endocarditis
ABG	arterial blood gas
ABI	acquired brain injury ankle brachial pressure index
ABLA	acute blood loss anemia
ABMT	autologous bone marrow transplantation
Abn	abnormal
ABO	Landsteiner's blood grouping system
ABPA	allergic broncho-pulmonary aspergillosis
ABPI	ankle brachial pressure index
ABR	Auditory Brainstem Response
ABT	antibiotic therapy
ABVD	Doxorubicin (adriamycin), bleomycin, vinblastine, dacarbazine (first-line treatment for Hodgkin's lymphoma)
ABX	antibiotics
a.c. AC	before a meal (from Latin ante cibum)
AC	abdominal circumference assisted controlled ventilation acromioclavicular joint antecubital fossa anticoagulation
ACA	acinic cell carcinoma Affordable Care Act anterior cerebral artery
ACB	aortocoronary bypass
AC&BC	air conduction and bone conduction, as in Weber test
Acc	accommodation (eye)
ACCU	acute coronary care unit
ACD	anemia of chronic disease
ACD	allergic contact dermatitis
ACDF	anterior cervical discectomy and fusion
Ace	acetone
ACE	angiotensin-converting enzyme
ACEI	angiotensin-converting enzyme inhibitor
ACh	acetylcholine
AChE	acetylcholine esterase
ACL	anterior cruciate ligament
ACLS	advanced cardiac life support
ACS	altered conscious state acute coronary syndrome acute chest syndrome
ACM	arrhythmogenic cardiomyopathy
ACTH	adrenocorticotropic hormone
ACP	advance care planning Advanced Clinical Practitioner
ACPO	acute colonic pseudo-obstruction
ACU	ambulatory care unit
ad.	right ear (from Latin auris dexter)
AD	Alzheimer's disease acute distress aortic dissection right ear (from Latin auris dexter) as directed
ADA	adenosine deaminase American Dental Association; American Diabetes Association; e.g., "ADA diet" Americans with Disabilities Act
ADC	AIDS dementia complex
ADCC	antibody-dependent cell-mediated cytotoxicity
ADD	attention deficit disorder
ADE	adverse drug event
ADH	antidiuretic hormone
ADHD	attention deficit hyperactivity disorder
ADHF	acute decompensated heart failure
ADHR	autosomal dominant hypophosphatemic rickets
ADL	activity of daily living
ADLs	activities of daily living
ad lib	as desired (from Latin ad libitum)
adm	admission
Adn	adnexa (for example, adnexa of the uterus)
ADP	adenosine diphosphate
ad part. dolent	to the painful parts (from Latin ad partes dolentes)
ADR	adverse drug reaction
ADW	Ain't Doin' Well
A/E	Air entry
A+E	accident and emergency
AEB	as evidenced by (commonly used by nurses)
AED	automated external defibrillator antiepileptic drug
AEM	ambulatory electrocardiogram monitoring
AF	atrial fibrillation atrial flutter amniotic fluid
AFAB	assigned female at birth
AF-AFP	amniotic fluid alpha fetoprotein
AFB	acid-fast bacilli
AFI	amniotic fluid index
AFib	atrial fibrillation
AFL	atrial flutter
AFNTR	acute febrile nonhemolytic transfusion reaction
AFO	ankle-foot orthosis
AFP	alpha-fetoprotein
AFSOF	anterior fontanelle soft, open, flat
Ag	antigen
AGA	anti-gliadin antibodies appropriate gestational age (see birth weight)
AGAB	assigned gender at birth
AGC	atypical glandular cells
AGES criteria	age, grade, extent, size (for tumors)
AGN	acute glomerulonephritis
AH	auditory hallucinations
a.h.	every other hour (from Latin alternis horis)
AHD	arteriosclerotic heart disease
AHF	antihemophilic factor
AHG	antihemophilic globulin
AHH	aryl hydrocarbon hydroxylase
AHI	apnea-hypopnea index
AHR	airway hyper-reactivity
AHT	antihyaluronic acid test
AI	artificial insemination aortic insufficiency aromatase inhibitors
AICD	automated implantable cardioverter-defibrillator
AID	artificial insemination by donor
AIDS	acquired immune deficiency syndrome
AIH	artificial insemination by husband
AIHA	autoimmune hemolytic anemia
AIHD	artificial insemination by pooled husband and donor semen
AIPD	acute infectious and parasitical diseases autoimmune progesterone dermatitis acute inflammatory demyelinating polyneuropathy
AIIRB	angiotensin II receptor antagonist
AIN	allergic interstitial nephritis
AIR	anterior interval release acute inpatient rehabilitation
AIS	adenocarcinoma in situ androgen insensitivity syndrome
AJCC	American Joint Committee on Cancer
AjD	adjustment disorder
AK	acanthamoeba keratitis
aka	also known as
AKA	above-knee amputation also known as
AKI	acute kidney injury, previously called Acute Renal Failure (ARF)
ALA	aminolevulinic acid
ALCAPA	anomalous left coronary artery from the pulmonary artery
ALF	assisted living facility
ALG	antilymphocytic globulin
ALI	acute limb injury acute lung injury
Alk phos	alkaline phosphatase (sometimes abbreviated as ALP)
ALL	acute lymphoblastic leukemia allergies
ALP	alkaline phosphatase (sometimes abbreviated as Alk phos)
ALPS	autoimmune lymphoproliferative syndrome
ALS	amyotrophic lateral sclerosis, also known as motor neurone disease ('MND), Lou Gehrig's disease or Charcot disease advanced life support
ALT	alanine transaminase
ALTE	apparent life-threatening event
altern. d.	every other day (from Latin alterno die)
AMA	advanced maternal age (often defined as 35 years or greater) against medical advice antimitochondrial antibody American Medical Association
AMAB	assigned male at birth
Amb	ambulate
AMC	arthrogryposis multiplex congenita
AMI	acute mesenteric ischemia acute myocardial infarction
AML	acute myeloid leukemia
AMO	advanced medical optics
AMP	adenosine monophosphate
Amp	ampule ampere
AMPA receptor	alpha-amino-3-hydroxy-5-methyl-4-isoxazolepropionic acid receptor of the brain
AMS	acute mountain sickness atypical measles syndrome altered mental status
Amt	amount
ANA	antinuclear antibody
ANCA	antineutrophil cytoplasmic antibody
AND	allowing natural death
ANDI	aberrations of normal development and involution (of breast)
ANF	atrial natriuretic factor
ANP	atrial natriuretic peptide
ANS	autonomic nervous system
Ant	anterior
Anti-	refers to an antibody to the suffixed antigen
ANTR	asymmetrical tonic neck reflex
ANUG	acute necrotizing ulcerative gingivitis
A&O or A/O	aware and oriented or alert and oriented
A&Ox3	alert and oriented, times 3 (to person, place, and time)
A&Ox4	alert and oriented, times 4 (to person, place, time, and circumstances) (often used interchangeably with A&Ox3)
AODM	adult-onset diabetes mellitus (now called diabetes mellitus type 2)
AOE	acute otitis external
AOM	acute otitis media
AOS	apraxia of speech
a.p.	before a meal (from Latin ante prandium)
AP	action potential alkaline phosphatase angina pectoris anteroposterior apical area postrema
A&P	auscultation and percussion anterior and posterior anatomy and physiology assessment and plan
A/P	anatomy and physiology assessment and plan
APACHE II	Acute Physiology and Chronic Health Evaluation II
APAP	paracetamol (aka acetaminophen) (from its chemical name, N-acetyl-para-aminophenol) automatic positive airway pressure
APC	atrial premature contraction antigen-presenting cell activated protein C argon plasma coagulation
APD	adult polycystic disease automated peritoneal dialysis
APKD	adult polycystic kidney disease
APECED	autoimmune polyendocrinopathy-candidiasis-ectodermal dystrophy
APGAR	appearance, pulse, grimace, activity, respiration (used to assess newborns)
APH	antepartum haemorrhage
APLS	antiphospholipid syndrome
APMPPE	acute posterior multifocal placoid pigment epitheliopathy
applic.	applicandus (Latin meaning "to be applied")
appy	appendectomy
APP	as per protocol (e.g., per institutional clinical protocol or per scientific protocol)
APR	abdominoperineal resection
APS	autoimmune polyendocrine/polyglandular syndrome antiphospholipid syndrome
APSAC	anisoylated plasminogen streptokinase activator complex
aPTT	activated partial thromboplastin time
aq.	water (from Latin aqua)
aq. bull.	boiling water (from Latin aqua bulliens)
aq. calid.	warm or hot water (from Latin aqua calida)
aq. dist.	distilled water (from Latin aqua distillata)
aq. gel.	cold water (from Latin aqua gelida)
AR	aortic regurgitation attributable risk
ARB	angiotensin II receptor antagonist
ARBI	alcohol-related brain injury (such as a fetal alcohol spectrum disorder or alcohol-related dementia)
ARC	AIDS-related complex
ARD	absolute risk difference alcohol-related dementia
ARDS	acute respiratory distress syndrome
ARF	acute renal failure
ARFID	avoidant/restrictive food intake disorder
Arg	arginine
ARM	artificial rupture of membranes (also abbreviated as AROM)
ARMD	age-related macular degeneration
ARMS	alveolar rhabdomyosarcoma
AROM	active range of motion artificial rupture of membranes
ART	antiretroviral therapy assuming room temperature (that is, the patient has died) assisted reproductive technology
ARVC	arrhythmogenic right ventricular cardiomyopathy
ARVD	arrhythmogenic right ventricular dysplasia
AS	aortic stenosis atherosclerosis ankylosing spondylitis
ASA	acetylsalicylic acid (aspirin); American Society of Anesthesiologists (physical status class)
ASB	asymptomatic bacteriuria
ASC	ambulatory surgery center atypical squamous cells
ASCA	anti–Saccharomyces cerevisiae antibodies
ASC-H	atypical squamous cells—cannot exclude HSIL
ASCAD	arteriosclerotic coronary artery disease
ASCUS; ASC-US	atypical squamous cells of undetermined significance
ASCVD	arteriosclerotic vascular disease (arteriosclerosis)
ASD	atrial septal defect autism spectrum disorder
ASGUS	atypical squamous glandular cells of undetermined significance
ASH; ASHD	arteriosclerotic heart disease (coronary heart disease)
ASH	asymmetric septal hypertrophy alcoholic steatohepatitis
ASIS	anterior superior iliac spine
ASM	anti-seizure medication (anticonvulsant)
ASO	antistreptolysin-O
ASOT	antistreptolysin-O titre
ASPECTS	Alberta Stroke Program Early CT Score, ASPECT Score
Ass	assessment
AST	aspartate transaminase
ASX	asymptomatic
A-T	ataxia-telangiectasia
AT	antithrombin angiotensin
AT-III	antithrombin III
ATA	antitransglutaminase antibodies
ATB	antibiotic
ATCC	ATCC (company) (formerly the American Type Culture Collection)
ATCP	atypical chest pain
ATG	anti-thymocyte globulin
ATLS	Advanced trauma life support
ATN	acute tubular necrosis
ATNR	asymmetrical tonic neck reflex
ATP	acute thrombocytopenic purpura adenosine triphosphate antitachycardia pacing
Atp	atypical
ATRA	all-trans retinoic acid
ATRT	atypical teratoid rhabdoid tumor
ATS	antitetanus serum, that is, antitetanus immunoglobulins
AU	each ear (from Latin auris utraque)
AUC	area under the curve (pharmacology)
aur.	ear (from Latin auris)
aur. dextro.	to right ear (from Latin auris dextrae)
aur. laev	to left ear (from Latin auris laevae)
aurist.	ear drops (from Latin auristillae)
AUS	Artificial urinary sphincter
AV	arteriovenous atrioventricular
AVF	arteriovenous fistula
AVM	arteriovenous malformation
AVN	avascular necrosis atrioventricular node
AVR	aortic valve replacement
AVSD	atrioventricular septal defect
afebrile, vital signs stable
A&W; A/W	alive and well associated with admitted with
Ax	axillary assessment
AXR	abdominal x-ray
AYA	adolescents and young adults
AZT	azidothymidine
