= Wuling Air EV =

Battery electric city car

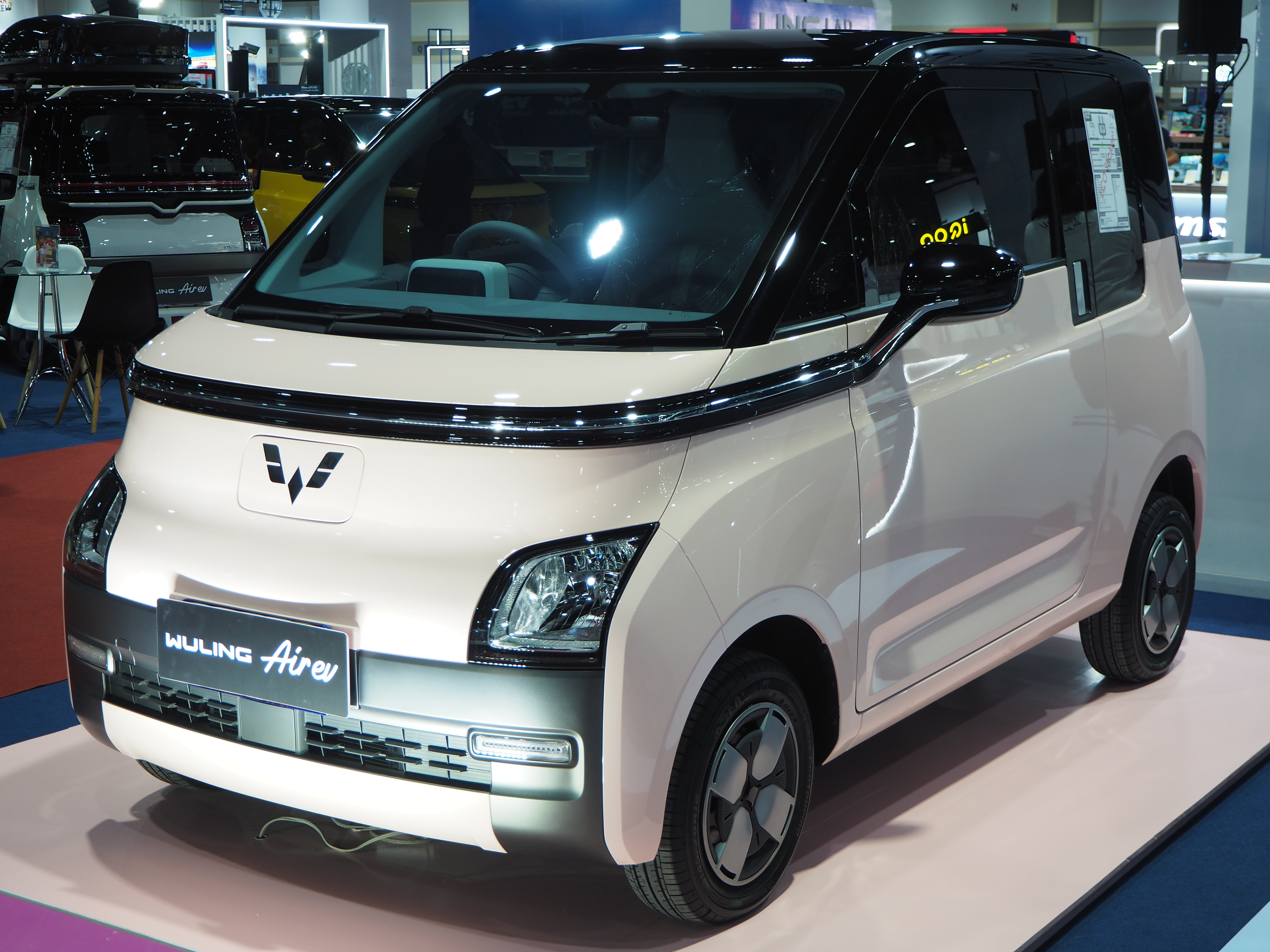

Overview
- Manufacturer: SAIC-GM-Wuling
- Model code: E230
- Also called: MG Comet EV (India)
- Production: 2022–present
- Assembly: China: Liuzhou, Guangxi; Indonesia: Cikarang, West Java (SGMW Indonesia); India: Halol, Gujarat (JSW MG Motor India)
- Designer: Gao Chenwei, Li Mu and Xia Sheng

Body and chassis
- Class: City car (A)
- Body style: 3-door hatchback
- Layout: Rear-motor, rear-wheel-drive
- Platform: SGMW Global Small Electric Vehicle
- Related: Wuling Hongguang Mini EV; Baojun E100; Baojun E200; Baojun E300

Powertrain
- Electric motor: 1x1XM AC permanent magnet synchronous motor
- Power output: 30 kW (40 hp; 41 PS); 50 kW (67 hp; 68 PS)
- Battery: Lithium-iron phosphate battery: 17.3 kWh; 26.7 kWh
- Electric range: 200–300 km (120–190 mi)
- Plug-in charging: 2.0 kW AC (Standard range); 6.6 kW AC (Long range)

Dimensions
- Wheelbase: 1,635 mm (64.4 in) (SWB); 2,010 mm (79.1 in) (LWB)
- Length: 2,599 mm (102.3 in) (SWB); 2,974 mm (117.1 in) (LWB)
- Width: 1,505 mm (59.3 in)
- Height: 1,631 mm (64.2 in)
- Kerb weight: 760–888 kg (1,676–1,958 lb)

The Wuling Air EV (Chinese: 五菱晴空; pinyin: Wǔlíng Qíngkōng; lit. 'clear sky') is a battery electric city car manufactured by SAIC-GM-Wuling (SGMW) since 2022. Based on SGMW's Global Small Electric Vehicle (GSEV) platform, the model is the third GSEV model to be marketed under the Wuling brand after the Hongguang Mini EV and the Nano EV.

== Overview ==
The Air EV was first introduced in Indonesia as the Wuling EV on 1 June 2022, before its debut in China on 3 June. For the Indonesian market, the model is assembled from knock-down kits from China at the SGMW Motor Indonesia plant in Cikarang, West Java. Indonesian models went on sale at the 29th Gaikindo Indonesia International Auto Show on 11 August.

In China, it went on sale in December 2022, and is offered in two- and four-seat configurations with differing body lengths and wheelbases.

The Air EV was one of the operational vehicles used for the 2022 G20 Bali summit in Bali.

Outside of Indonesian market, the Air EV was went on sale in Nepal in December 2022, Thailand in July 2023, and in Brunei in late September 2023.

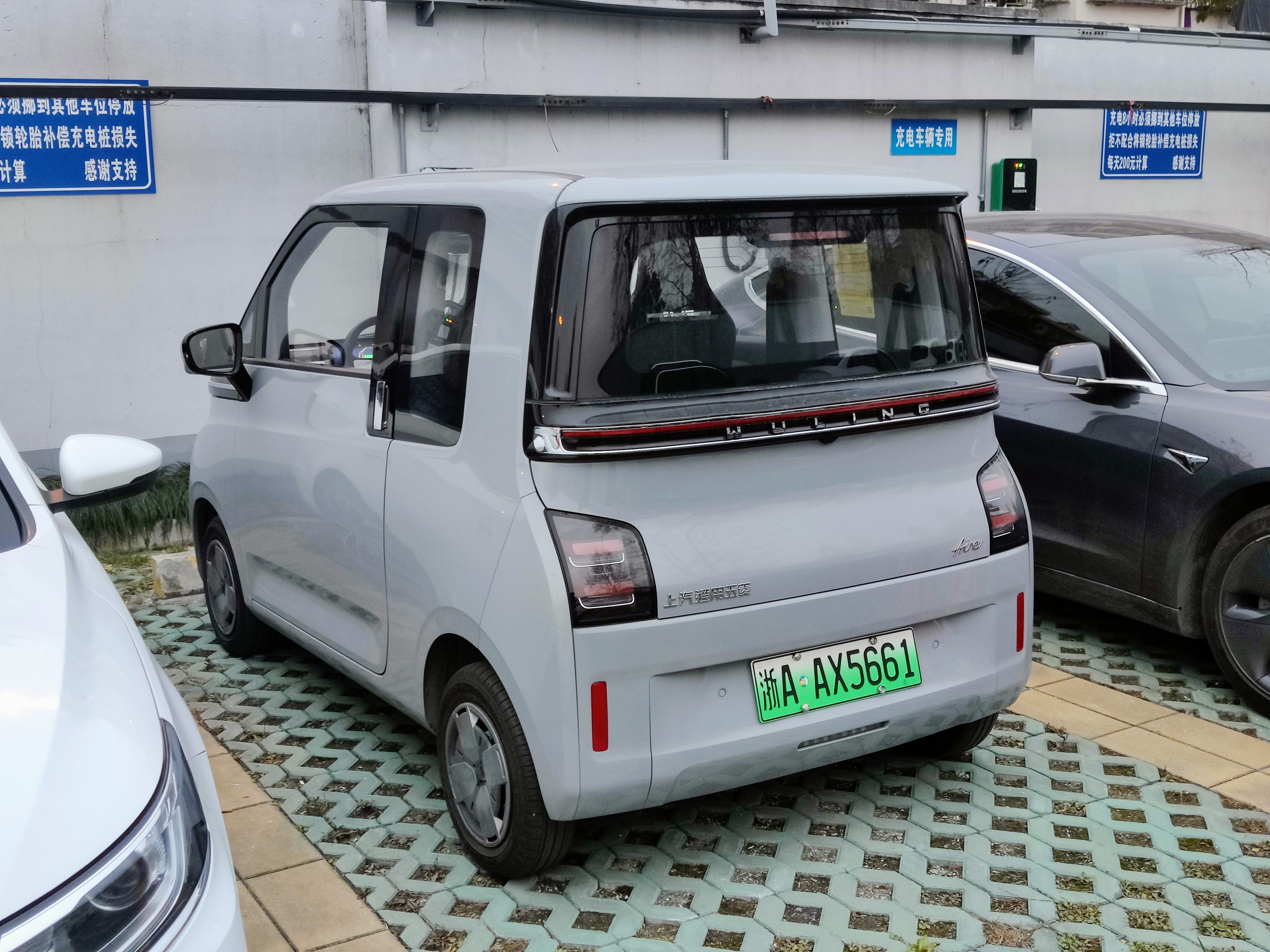
Rear view

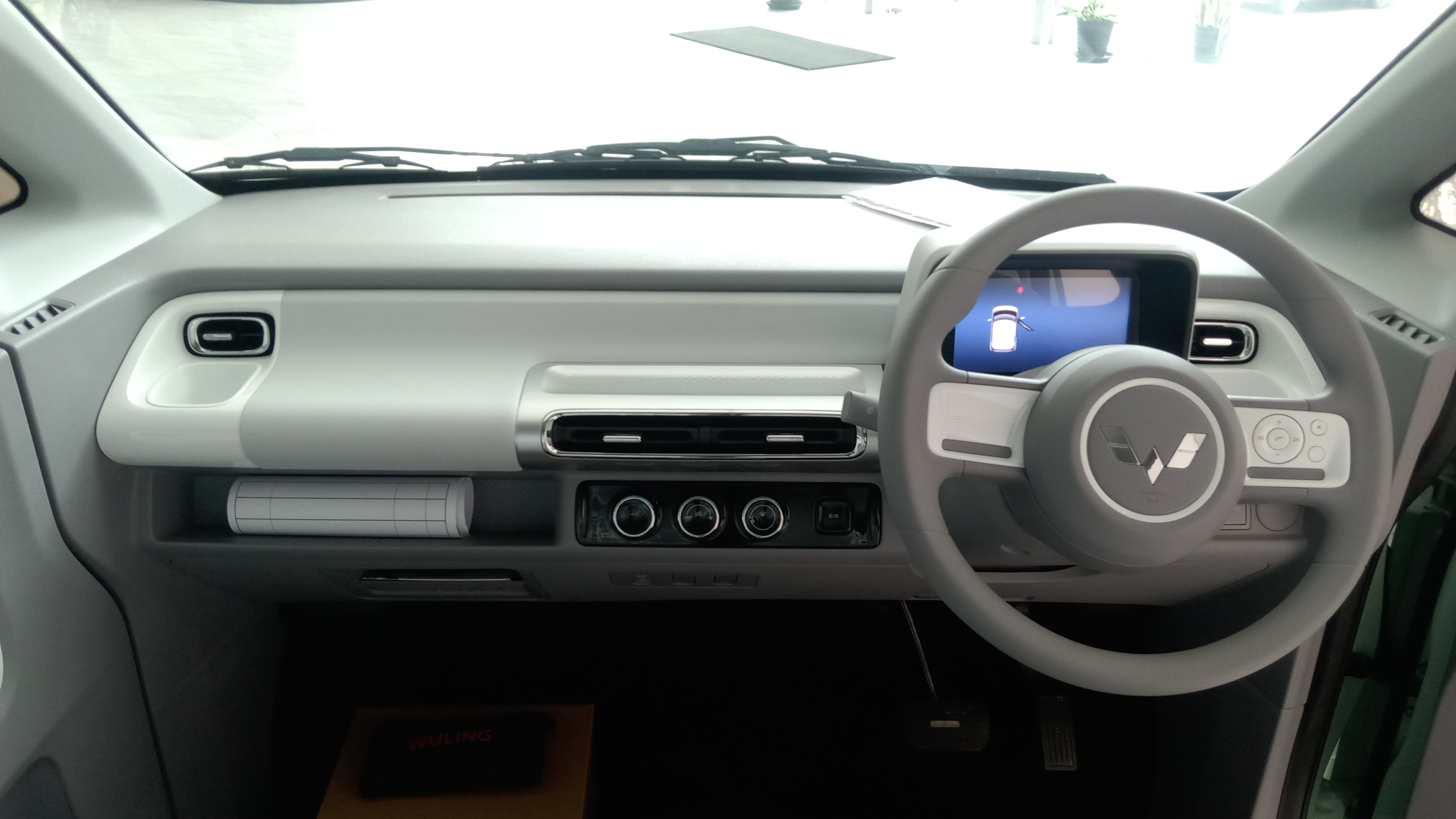
Interior

== MG Comet EV ==
In April 2023, a rebadged version of the Air EV called the MG Comet EV was launched in India by MG Motor.

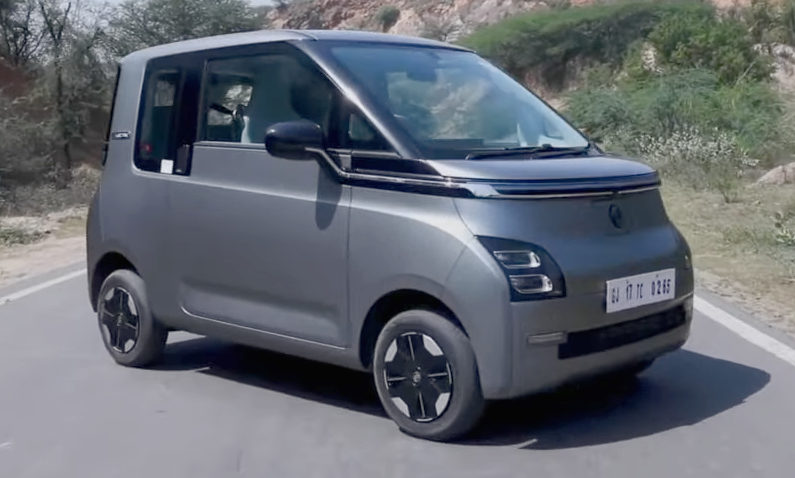
2023 MG Comet EV Plush (India)

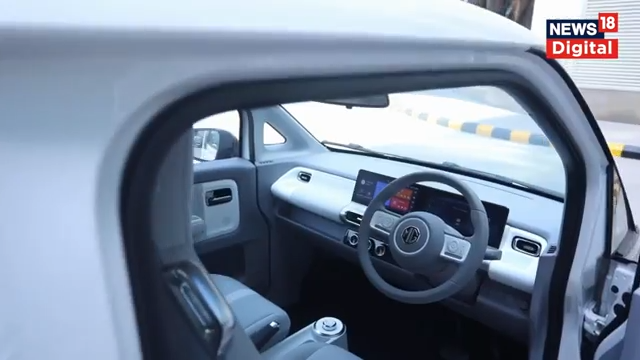
Interior

== Sales ==
Year	China	Indonesia	India	Thailand
2022	2,220	8,053		
2023	7,597	5,575	6,628	491
2024	1,936	4,440		490
2025	11	3,894	10,442	
