= Asca (disambiguation) =

Asca is a genus of mites.

Asca or ASCA may also refer to:

== Organisations ==
- ASCA (news agency), Italy (founded 1969)
- Accumulating savings & credit association, a form of microfinance
- American Swimming Coaches Association (founded 1958)
- Association for Student Conduct Administration, United States (founded 1987)

== People ==
- Asca (singer) or Asuka Ōkura (born 1996), Japanese musician

== Science ==
- Advanced Satellite for Cosmology and Astrophysics, launched from Japan in 1993
- ANOVA-simultaneous component analysis, in bioinformatics
- Anti-saccharomyces cerevisiae antibody, in immunology
