= Air University =

Air University may refer to:

- Air University (United States Air Force), at Maxwell Air Force Base, Alabama, United States
- Air University (Pakistan Air Force), in Islamabad, Pakistan
- Air University (South Korean Air Force), in Yuseong-gu, South Korea
