= AIRS =

AIRS may refer to:

- Atmospheric Infrared Sounder, a weather and climate instrument flying on NASA's Aqua satellite
- Advanced Inertial Reference Sphere, a guidance system designed for use in the LGM-118A Peacekeeper ICBM
- Put on airs, a phrase describing a person who behaves as if they are better than other people

== See also ==
- Air (disambiguation)
