= Arthrofibrosis =

Joint tissue pathology

Arthrofibrosis (from Greek: arthro- joint, fibrosis – scar tissue formation) has been described in most joints like knee, hip, ankle, foot joints, shoulder (frozen shoulder, adhesive capsulitis), elbow (stiff elbow), wrist, hand joints as well as spinal vertebrae. It can occur after injury or surgery or may arise without an obvious cause. There is excessive scar tissue formation within the joint and/or surrounding soft tissues leading to painful restriction of joint motion that persists despite physical therapy and rehabilitation. The scar tissue may be located inside the knee joint or may involve the soft tissue structures around the knee joint, or both locations.

The pathology that causes arthrofibrosis also causes other forms of fibrosis. Injury and inflammation activates fibroblasts and other cell types, turning them into myofibroblasts which create scar tissue and more inflammation.

== Arthrofibrosis of the knee (frozen knee) ==
Arthrofibrosis of the knee, also known as "frozen knee", has been one of the more studied joints as a result of its frequency of occurrence. Arthrofibrosis can follow knee injury and knee surgeries like arthroscopic knee surgery or knee replacement. Scar tissue can cause structures of the knee to become contracted, restricting normal motion. Depending on the site of scarring, knee cap mobility and/or joint range of motion (i.e. flexion, extension, or both) may be affected. Symptoms experienced as a result of arthrofibrosis of the knee include stiffness, pain, limping, heat, swelling, crepitus, and/or weakness. Clinical diagnosis may also include the use of magnetic resonance imaging (or MRI) to visualize the knee compartments affected. The consequent pain may lead to the cascade of quadriceps weakness, patellar tendon shortening and scarring in the tissues around the knee cap—with an end stage of permanent patella infera—where the knee cap is pulled down into an abnormal position where it becomes vulnerable to joint surface damage.

== Arthrofibrosis after knee injury, knee arthroscopy or other surgeries ==
The first step in treating arthrofibrosis is appropriately directed physical therapy with a focus on icing and elevating and passive stretching exercises such as continuous passive motion (CPM). Passive stretching can increase range of motion if conducted frequently and carefully so that tissues are not torn. There are a number of treatment options and treatment varies depending on the knowledge of the treating clinician and on the cause and duration of the fibrosis. Often physical therapy is used as an attempt at conservative management. Knowledge of the role of inflammation in arthrofibrosis has led a cautionary approach to exercise, because exercise increases inflammation. Advice to AF patients now typically consists of "listen to your knee" and stop, or reduce, activities that increase pain during and after exercise. Aggressive exercise of the affected limb may cause permanent damage.

If physical therapy fails options include manipulation under anaesthesia (MUA), arthroscopic lysis of adhesions and open lysis of adhesions. Although MUA and surgery can be successful, the resulting increase in inflammation may cause scar tissue to rapidly return and symptoms can worsen.

Pharmacological interventions such as anti-inflammatory medications and supplements are increasingly used to treat arthrofibrosis. Biologics that reduce the signalling of the major inflammatory cytokines TNF-α (Simponi, Humira) and IL-1β (anakinra) are promising treatments. Consultation with a rheumatologist can help to determine appropriate medications.

== After knee replacement ==
Arthrofibrosis can occur after total knee replacement or partial knee replacement, when excessive scar tissue (collagen fibril) deposition occurs in and around the knee. This can be accompanied by shortening of the patellar tendon (patella baja/infera) which can also contribute to limited flexion. The rates of AF after TKA vary widely in the literature as there is no standard definition. One study's definition is a total range of motion (ROM) <90 degrees constitutes AF, another definition is flexion contracture >10 degrees, or inability to flex the knee >100 degrees. AF is a diagnosis of exclusion; before making a final diagnosis of arthrofibrosis, other causes of stiffness following knee replacement should be excluded (ex: infection, malposition of the implants, or mechanical block to motion).

In the case of AF after total knee arthroplasty (TKA) management traditionally consisted of aggressive physical therapy, and in the case that failed, manipulation under anesthesia (MUA). As discussed above, aggressive exercise is now avoided. The rates of MUA after TKA vary widely. There are several reasons for this: there is no definite consensus to when a MUA is required (different surgeons follow different indications), there is no standardized definition of arthrofibrosis (see above), and MUA is not always a reliable treatment. MUAs can lead to adverse outcomes, including fractures, rupture of tendons, damage to the prosthesis, heterotrophic ossification, muscle tears and bleeding and the return of scar tissue. For these reasons treatment patterns vary widely. MUA after TKA is more likely to be to be successful if performed in the first 8–12 weeks after surgery. After 12 weeks manipulation is much less likely to have an acceptable outcome.

If the fibrosis is chronic (more than 12 weeks) there is a decreased likelihood of success with MUA, and open lysis of adhesions is sometime performed. However, this carries with it the attendant risks of another open procedure (i.e., infection, blood clots, blood loss, etc.) and the return of scar tissue.
