= On air =

On air or On Air may refer to:

== Music ==
- On Air (The Yardbirds album), 1991
- On Air (Alan Parsons album), 1996
- On Air (John Fahey album), 2004
- On Air (Chris Whitley album), 2008
- On Air – Live at the BBC Volume 2, by the Beatles, 2013
- On Air (Queen album), 2016
- On Air (The Rolling Stones album), 2017

== Media ==
- On air, in broadcasting, the state of currently broadcasting or prerecording a program
- On Air with Ryan Seacrest, n American radio program
  - On Air with Ryan Seacrest (TV series), an American talk show
- On Air (film), a 2012 French film
- On Air (TV series), a South Korean drama
- On Air (journal), published by the Hospital Broadcasting Association

== Other ==
- OnAir (telecommunications), a telecommunications company
- On Air (streaming service)

== See also ==
- On the Air (disambiguation)
- Radio broadcasting
- Television broadcasting
