= Baojun KiWi EV =

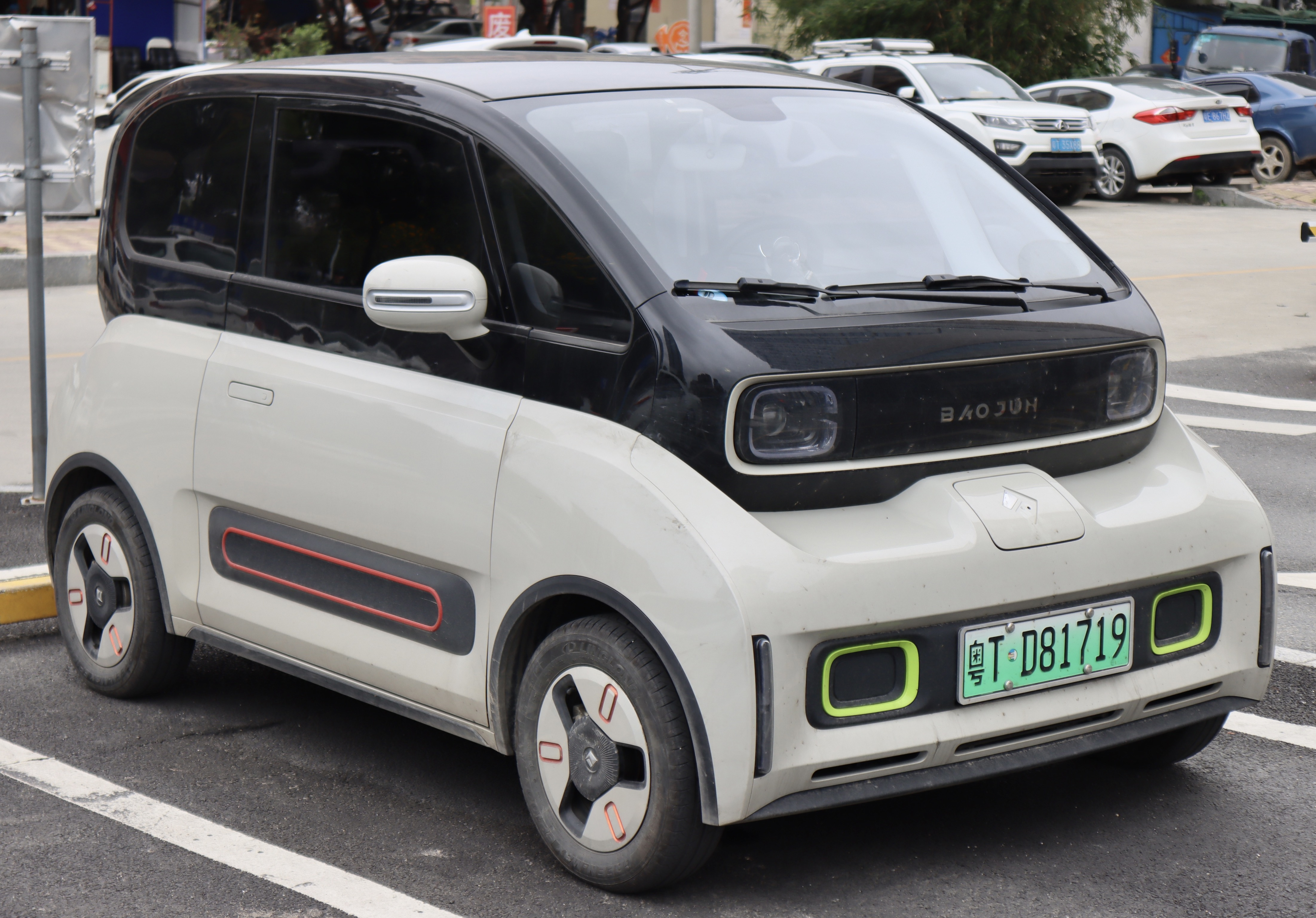

Overview
- Manufacturer: SAIC-GM-Wuling
- Also called: Baojun E300 (pre-facelift model)
- Production: 2020–2025
- Assembly: China: Liuzhou, Guangxi
- Designer: Exterior: Peng Chen, Yutian Gao, Bo Li; Interior: Haman Ezzati, Qiuchen Li

Body and chassis
- Class: Microcar
- Body style: 3-door hatchback
- Layout: Rear-motor, rear-wheel-drive
- Platform: SGMW Global Small Electric Vehicle
- Related: Baojun E100; Baojun E200; Wuling Hongguang Mini EV

Powertrain
- Electric motor: 40 kW (54 PS; 54 hp) Permanent magnet synchronous motor
- Transmission: Single-Speed
- Battery: 31.9 kWh

Dimensions
- Wheelbase: 1,750–2,020 mm (68.9–79.5 in)
- Length: 2,625–2,894 mm (103.3–113.9 in)
- Width: 1,647–1,655 mm (64.8–65.2 in)
- Height: 1,588–1,595 mm (62.5–62.8 in)
- Kerb weight: 920–1,052 kg (2,028–2,319 lb)

The Baojun KiWi EV is a battery electric city car manufactured by SAIC-GM-Wuling (SGMW) from 2020 to 2025 under the Baojun brand. It is a four-seater car with two doors and a hatch at the rear.

== History ==
SAIC-GM-Wuling showed the first pictures of the vehicle in the cubic design in December 2019. At that time, it was still announced as a new energy vehicle (NEV). The microcar had its public premiere in January 2020 in Guangxi. The E300 series has been sold in China since May 2020. In August 2021, the E300 was updated and relaunched as the Baojun KiWi EV.

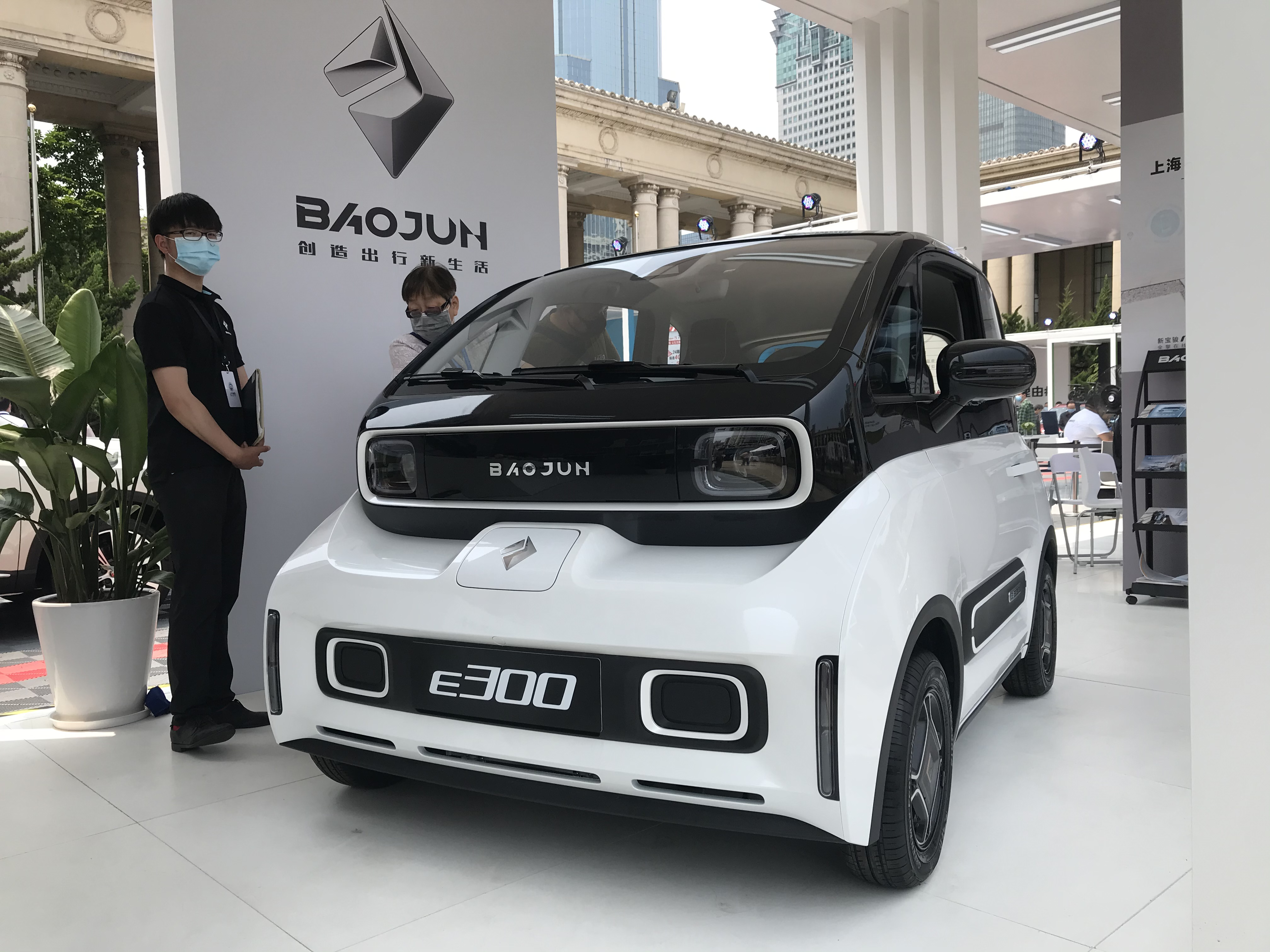
Baojun E300

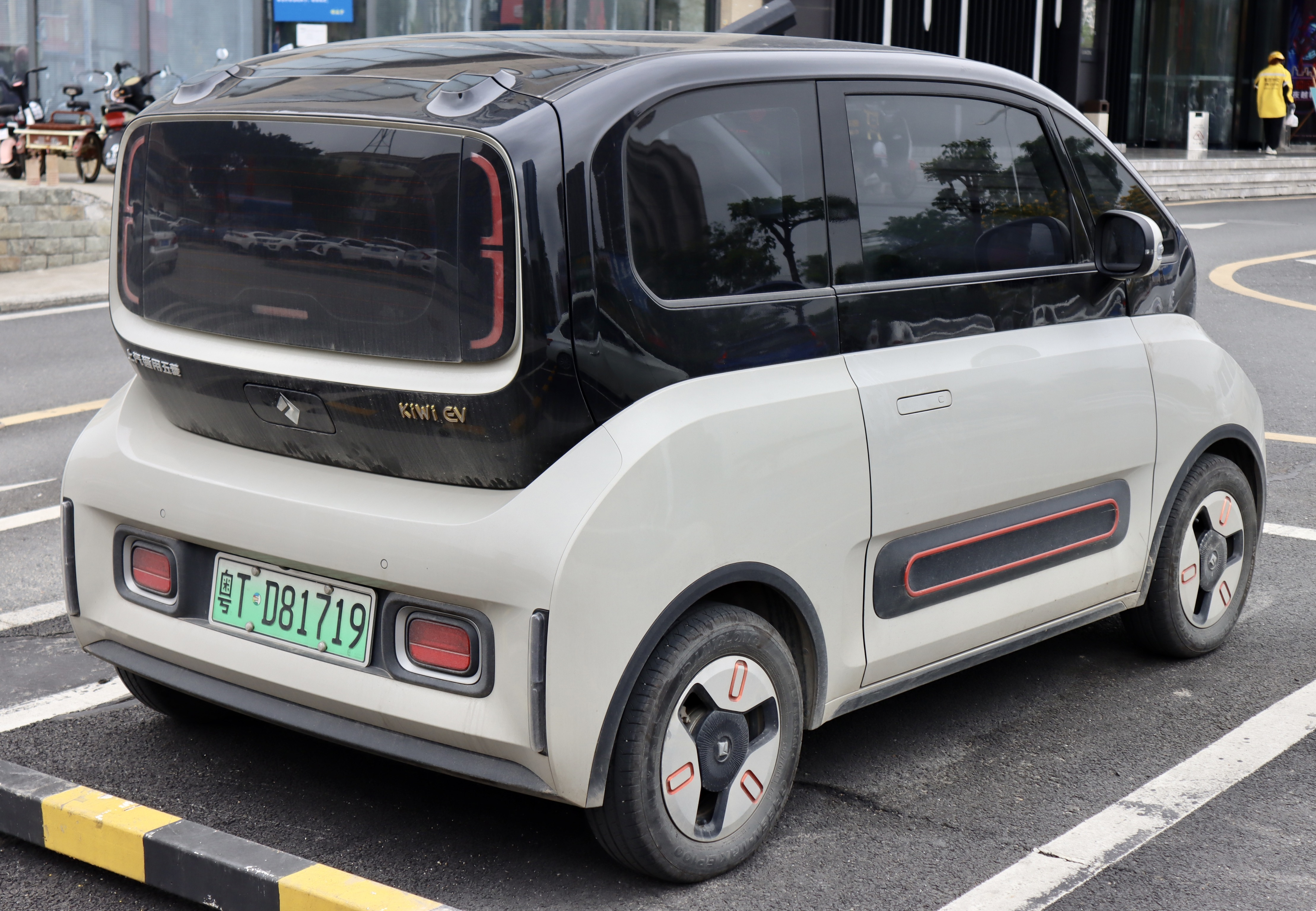
Baojun KiWi EV rear

The car is offered as a shorter E300 with two or three seats or as a longer E300 Plus with four seats.

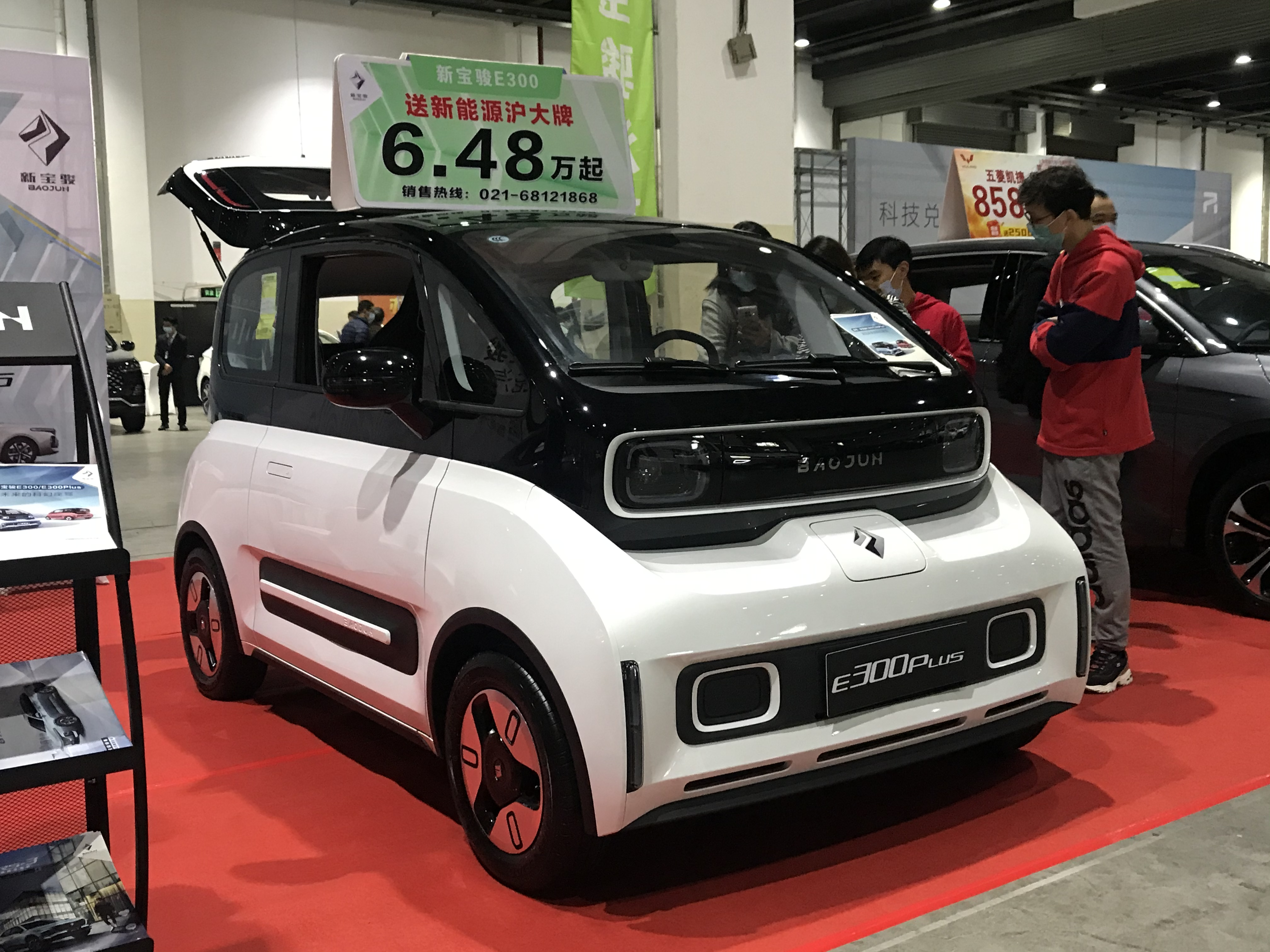
Baojun E300 Plus

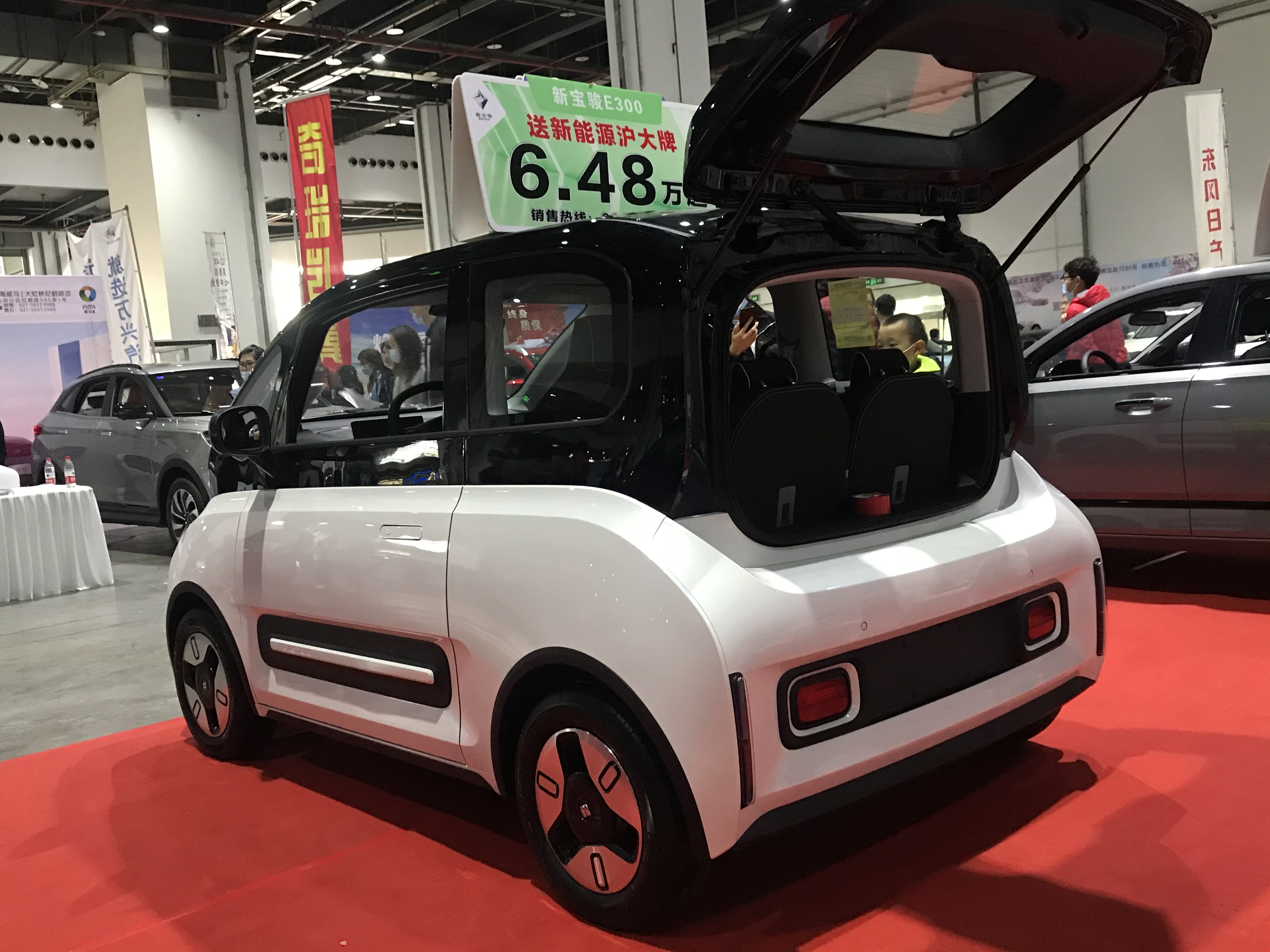
Baojun E300 Plus rear

== Specifications ==
The Baojun E300 has a synchronous fixed ratio gearbox and rear-motor, rear-wheel-drive layout, generating 40 kW (54 hp; 54 PS) of maximum power and 150 N⋅m (111 lb⋅ft) of maximum torque. It has a top speed of 100 kilometres per hour (62 mph) and supports DC fast charging, enabling it to be fully charged in one hour. The top-of-the-line version of the E300 Plus is equipped with a 31.9 kWh (115 MJ) battery and an NEDC range of 305 kilometres (190 mi).

Suspension is a McPherson independent suspension and double wishbone independent suspension design.

== Safety ==
Safety features include electronic stability control (ESC), the anti-lock braking system (ABS) with electronic brake-force distribution (EBD), hydraulic brake assist (HBA), and dual front airbags. More than 80% of the body consists of high-strength steel. The battery pack is wrapped in high-strength steel and is equipped with an active power-off system for an extra protection precaution in the event of a collision.

== Sales ==
Year	China
2023	5,639
2024	3,573
2025	191
