= Air (painting) =

Painting by Jan van Kessel the Elder

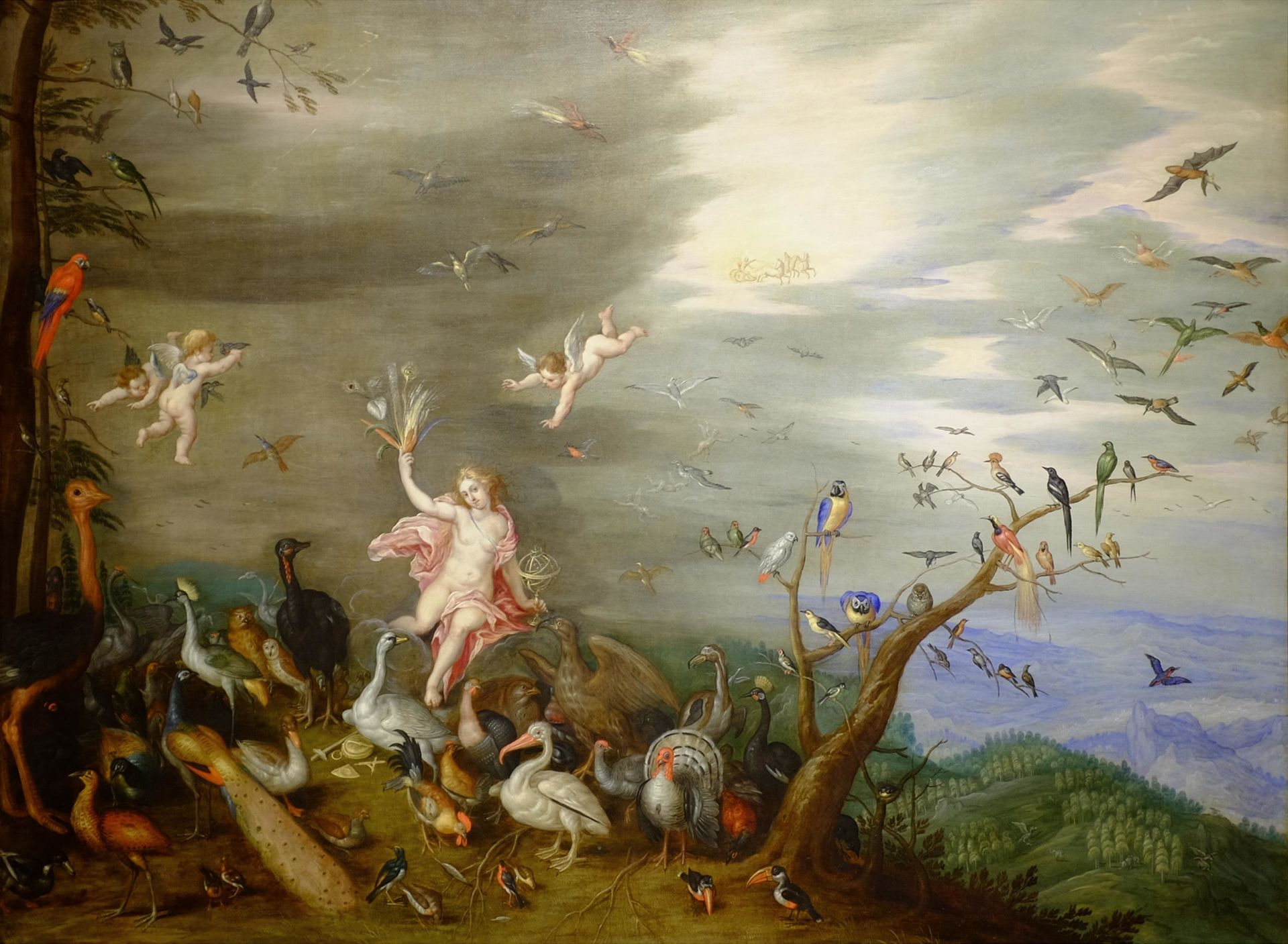
Air, oil on copper, c. 1647, 76.2 × 99.1 cm

Air is a painting created by Flemish painter Jan van Kessel the Elder (1626–1679) and was painted around the year 1647. It is a part of the permanent collection at the Flint Institute of Arts, in Flint, Michigan.

The four elements – earth, air, fire and water – were popular subjects with 17th century painters. In this painting, air is represented by a wide variety of creatures of flight, mythological figures and atmospheric conditions. A multitude of birds, including peacocks, turkeys, parrots, owls and an ostrich are shown in the painting. Several bats also appear in the painting, including one in the upper right that devours a bird while in flight, which some bats are known to do. In the center of the painting, Apollo drives his chariot across the sky. Beneath him, Urania, the Muse of Astronomy, sits on a cloud, and in her left hand she holds an armillary sphere. Another of her attributes, the compass, appears on the ground next to her along with an astrolabe, a quadrant, and a cross staff, which are all instruments used for measuring the position of the planets and stars. All of this takes place in a landscape characterized by a dark, stormy sky on the left, complete with a bolt of lightning. On the right, the sky brightens over a vast expanse of trees and mountains.

The composition can be traced back to a prototype developed by van Kessel's grandfather, Jan Brueghel I. Like his uncle, Jan Brueghel II, and other members of his family, van Kessel continued Jan I's work. In fact, the tradition of copying the elder Brueghel's composition continued into the 18th century.
