= Anterior interval release =

- Specialty: Orthopedic

Anterior interval release (AIR) is a type of arthroscopic knee surgery performed to alleviate pain and associated symptoms caused by scar tissue (or fibrosis) accumulation in the anterior region of the knee, behind and under the knee cap (or patella), in a condition called arthrofibrosis. In normal, asymptomatic knees, this anterior compartment of the knee comprises mobile, scar-free tissues such as the infrapatellar (Hoffa's) fat pad. With progression, scar tissue (or fibrosis) leads to closure of the anterior interval, tethering the patella tendon and causing pain, loss of range of motion, damage to knee cartilage, and/or pain, among other symptoms.

Diagnosis of arthrofibrosis or scar tissue in the anterior interval can consist of clinical signs such as a positive Hoffa test, loss in knee flexion, and/or diminished superoinferior patella mobility, with supplementation by magnetic resonance imaging (or MRI)

Post-surgical rehabilitation should be conservative in nature, focusing on maintaining joint mobility via early motion to avoid reformation of scar tissue. Early motion may be promoted by specific mobility exercises and use of continuous passive motion. Restoration of joint range of motion may be augmented by specialized bracing devices. Weight bearing is delayed appropriately post-surgically to promote control of swelling, pain, and joint irritation. Strengthening is delayed to a minimum of 6 weeks, often several months, post-operatively.

The origins leading to arthrofibrosis are unclear. They frequently have involved previous knee injury or trauma, such as anterior cruciate ligament reconstruction surgery. More subtle origins of fibrotic contracture in the anterior interval have also been attributed to plica (or naturally occurring folds in the knee joint lining) that become stiff and restrictive.
