= Attenuated patella alta =

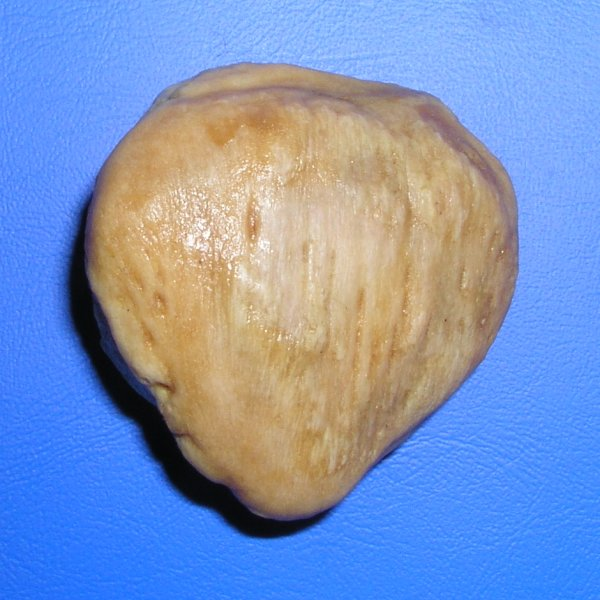
- Human left patella from the front

Attenuated patella alta is an extremely rare condition affecting mobility and leg strength. It is characterized by an unusually small knee cap (patella) that develops out of and above the joint. Typically, as the knee cap sits in the joint, it is stimulated to growth by abrasion from the opposing bones. When not situated properly in the joint, the knee cap does not experience such stimulation and remains small and undeveloped. Note that the cartilage under and around the kneecap is eight times smoother than ice, so "abrasion" may not be the best term.

A similar condition, patella alta, can occur as the result of a sports injury, though the large majority of the time it is a congenital/developmental condition that is unrelated to trauma. A kneecap in an "alta" position sits above the "trochlear groove" and therefore is less stable. The "patellar tendon" that connects the kneecap to the tibia (shinbone) is elongated (longer than normal). This cannot happen by way of trauma, unless there has been a rupture of the tendon and a less-than-optimal surgical repair.

There have been only three documented case of the disorder noted from birth. In 1988, three-year-old Eric Rogstad of Minneapolis, Minnesota was discovered to have the condition in both knees after several attempts by his parents and family physician to discover the cause of his difficulties with walking and running. After surgery and physical therapy, Eric gained the ability to walk and run without significant difficulty. Surprisingly, in 2016, two cases were discovered. 42 year old Anne Stone of Birmingham, England, and 27 year old Michael Brennan of Phoenix, Arizona, were independently diagnosed with bilateral attenuated patella alta.

Insall Ratio: This ratio is calculated with the knee flexed to 30 degrees. It is the ratio of the length of the patella to the length of the patellar tendon. Typically, this ratio is 1:1 but 20% variation represents patella alta or patella infera. Actually, the Insall-Salvati ratio can be measured at any degree of flexion, which is one reason for its popularity.

== See also ==
- Patella
