= Air University (South Korean Air Force) =

Air University (Korean: 공군대학; Hanja: 空軍大學) was a university located in Yuseong District, South Korea. The university was closed in 2011.
