= Baojun E200 =

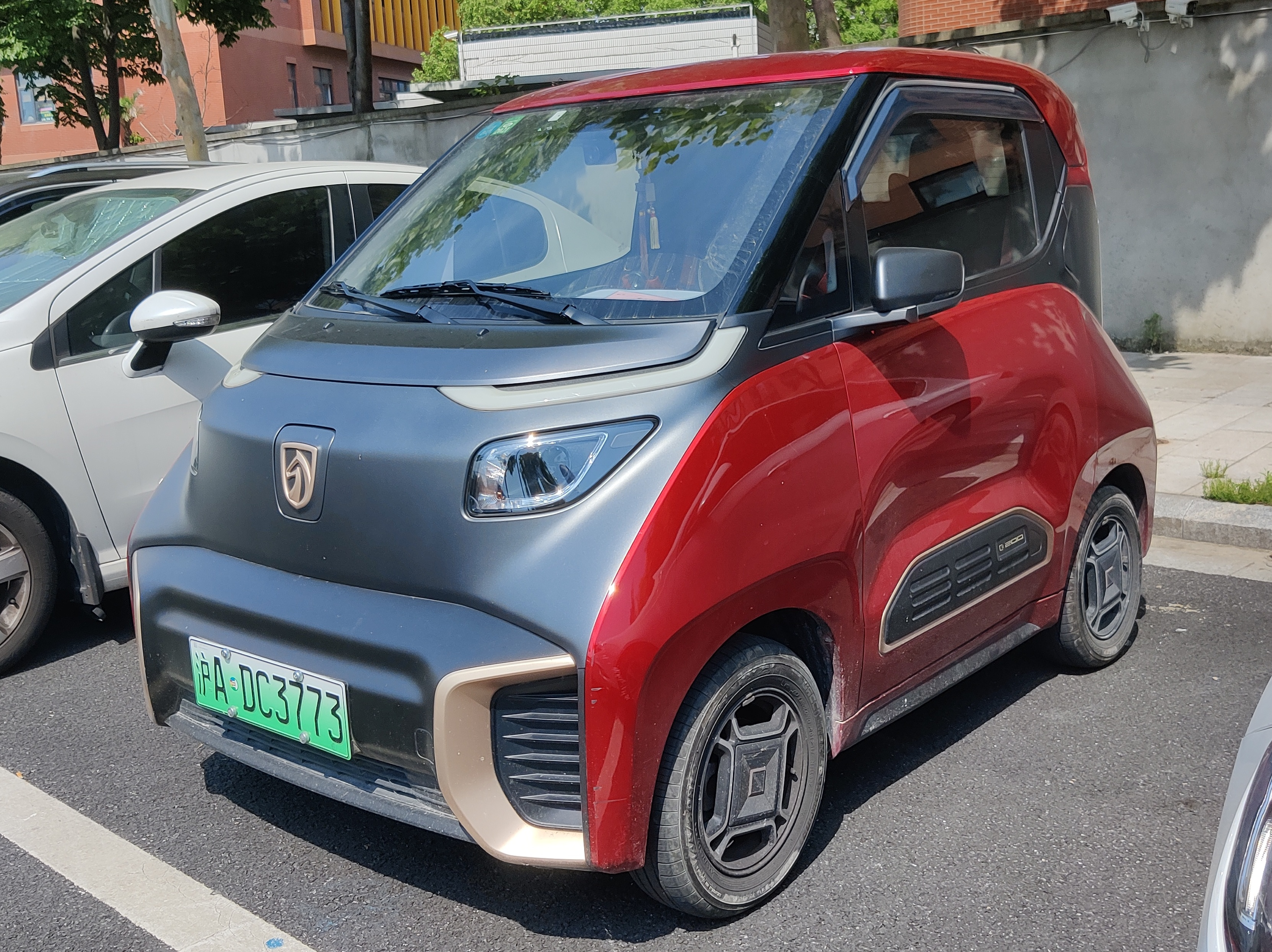

Overview
- Manufacturer: SAIC-GM-Wuling
- Also called: Wuling Nano EV
- Production: 2018–2025
- Assembly: China: Liuzhou, Guangxi
- Designer: Zhou Fang; Zida Ren

Body and chassis
- Class: Microcar
- Body style: 3-door hatchback
- Layout: Front motor, front-wheel-drive
- Platform: SGMW Global Small Electric Vehicle
- Related: Baojun E100; Baojun E300; Wuling Hongguang Mini EV

Powertrain
- Electric motor: 29 kW (39 PS; 39 hp) Permanent magnet synchronous motor
- Transmission: Single-Speed
- Battery: 24 kWh
- Electric range: 210–270 km (130.5–167.8 mi)

Dimensions
- Wheelbase: 1,600 mm (63.0 in)
- Length: 2,497 mm (98.3 in)
- Width: 1,526 mm (60.1 in)
- Height: 1,616 mm (63.6 in)
- Kerb weight: 842 kg (1,856 lb)

The Baojun E200 is a battery electric city car manufactured by SAIC-GM-Wuling (SGMW) from 2018 to 2025 under the Baojun marque. It is a two-seater car with two doors and a hatch at the rear. It is the second vehicle in Baojun's electric microcar series, after the E100 and before the E300. Since 2021, it is also known as the Wuling Nano EV.

== Overview ==
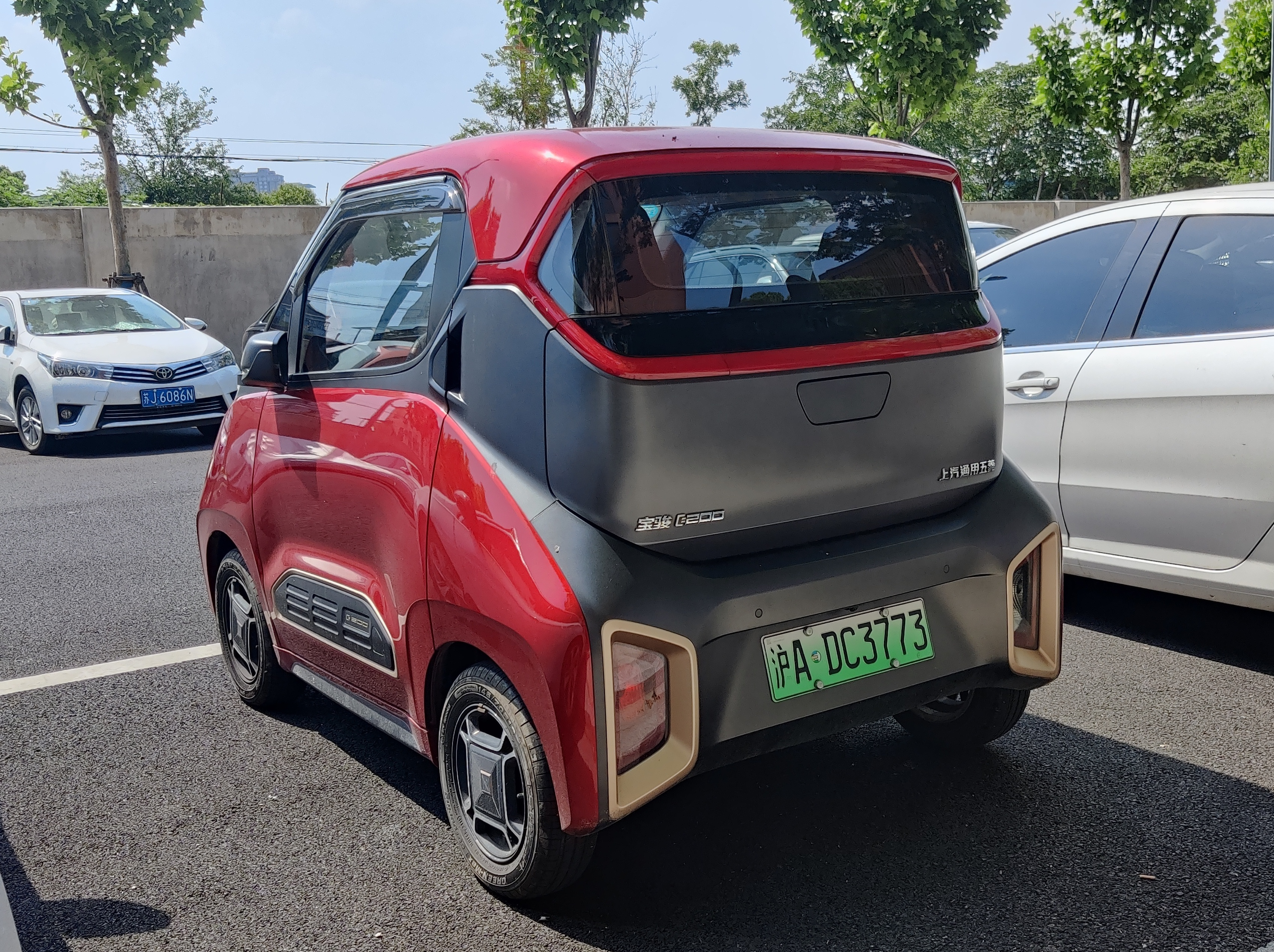
Baojun E200 rear

The Baojun brand of the General Motors-Chinese joint venture known as SAIC-GM-Wuling, commenced production on the model in September 2018 and from February 2018 the E200 was available to order at market launch throughout China. It is the second Baojun electric car following the Baojun E100.

The E200 has two different range variants with 270 kilometers (167 miles) and 210 kilometers (103 miles) respectively under the New European Driving Cycle (NEDC) on a single charge. The battery system has increased density compared to the Baojun E100, enabling the 24 kWh battery to store more energy with the same volume. The ranges represent a 6-mile improvement over the E100 and the energy consumption of the E200 is 10.3 kWh/100 km. The E200 is powered by a 29 kW (39 hp) electric motor that accelerates the car up to a top speed of 100 km/h or 63 mph. 0 to 100 km/h acceleration of the E200 is 15.8 seconds. The E200 is priced at 54,800 yuan ($7,697) and 64,800 yuan for the two range variants after government incentives.

The Baojun E200 has a list of feature including a 7-Inch colour instrument cluster, LED headlamps, dual-channel speakers and a remote interactive system that shows information on the charging status, parking navigation, power supply status and vehicle inspection. Antilock Brakes (ABS) plus Electric Brakeforce Distribution (EBD) and Electronic Stability Control (ESC) are the main E200 safety features. No airbags are equipped. The E200 comes standard with 12 inch wheels, and the curb weight of the E200 is 830 kg or 1830 lbs. The maximum operating weight 980 kg or 2 161 lbs for the E200.

== Wuling Nano EV ==
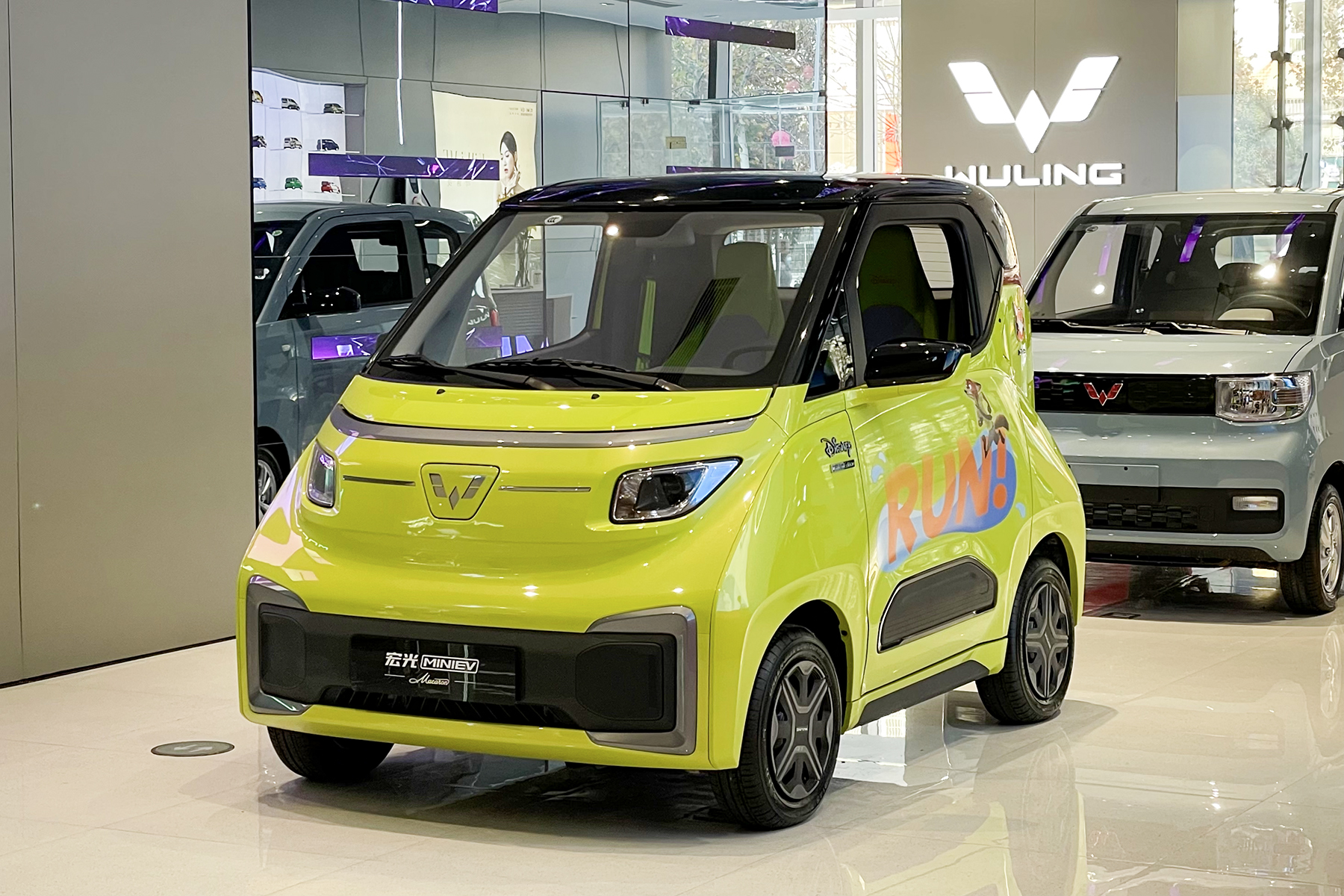
Wuling Nano EV on display

The Wuling Nano EV electric city car is a rebadged and restyled version of the Baojun E200, made for the SAIC-GM-Wuling joint-venture, and launched at the Tianjin International Auto Show with two limited editions based on characters from Disney's Zootopia.

== Sales ==
E200
Year	China
2023	200
2024	1
2025	2

== See also ==
- Baojun E100
- Baojun E300
