= On the Air =

On the Air may refer to:

- On the Air (album), 1984, by Billy Preston
- On the Air (TV series), an American sitcom
- On the Air (film), a 1934 British musical comedy
- On the Air (band), an English rock band
- On the Air (radio play), a 1931 Australian radio musical comedy play
- "On the Air", an amateur radio magazine published by the ARRL.
- "On the Air", a song by Peter Gabriel from his second solo album

== See also ==
- On the Aire, a current affairs programme in Leeds, England
- On air (disambiguation)
