= Baojun E100 =

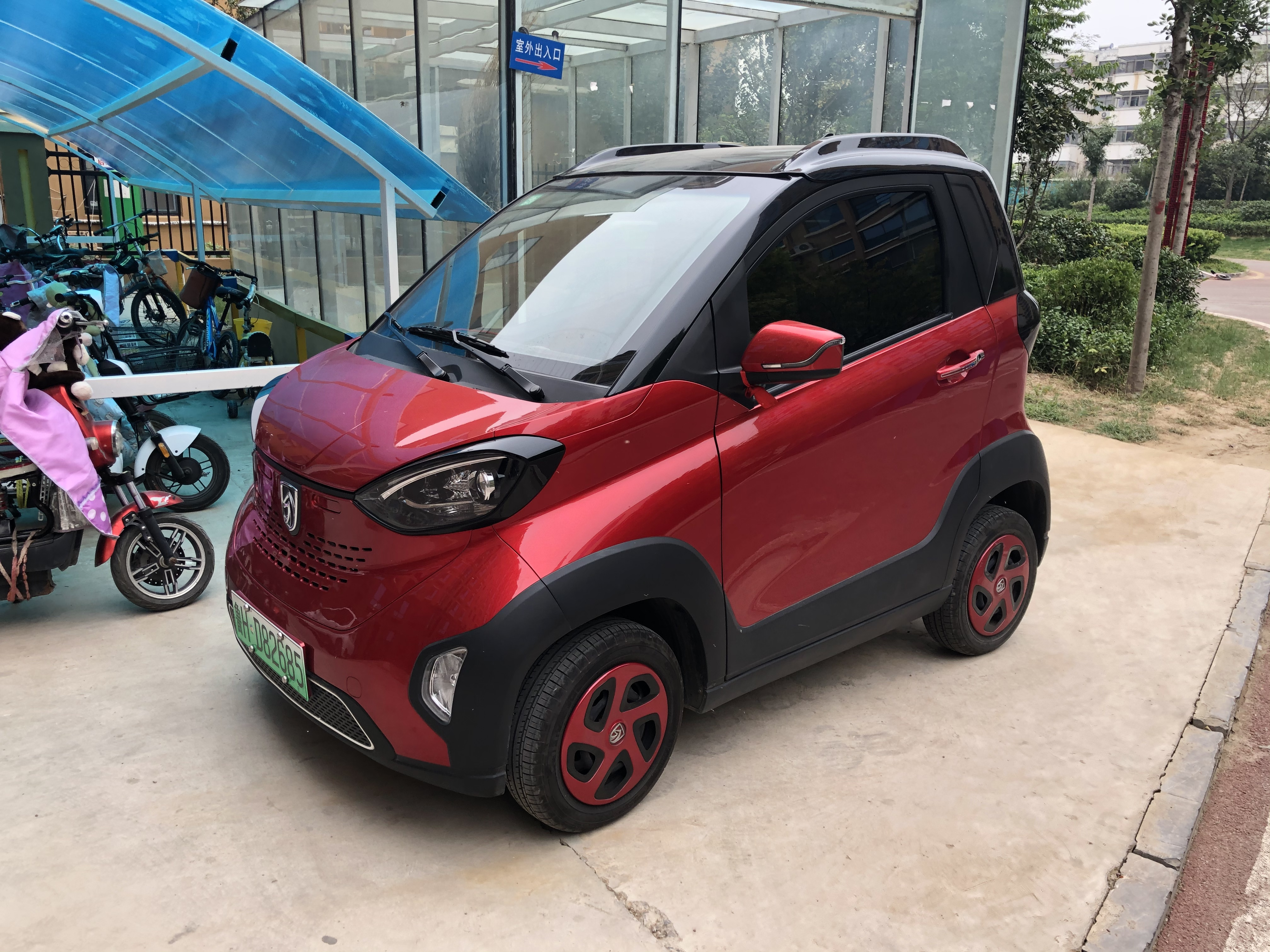

Overview
- Manufacturer: SAIC-GM-Wuling
- Production: 2017–2021
- Assembly: China: Liuzhou, Guangxi

Body and chassis
- Class: Microcar
- Body style: 3-door hatchback
- Layout: Front motor, front-wheel-drive
- Platform: SGMW Global Small Electric Vehicle
- Related: Baojun E200; Baojun E300; Wuling Hongguang Mini EV

Powertrain
- Electric motor: 29 kW (39 PS; 39 hp) Permanent magnet synchronous motor
- Transmission: Single-speed
- Battery: 14.9 kWh lithium-ion
- Electric range: 250 km (155.3 mi)

Dimensions
- Wheelbase: 1,600 mm (63.0 in)
- Length: 2,488 mm (98.0 in)
- Width: 1,506 mm (59.3 in)
- Height: 1,670 mm (65.7 in)
- Kerb weight: 840 kg (1,852 lb)

The Baojun E100 is a battery electric city car manufactured by SAIC-GM-Wuling (SGMW) from 2017 under the Baojun marque. It is a two-seater car with two doors and a hatch at the rear. It is the first vehicle in Baojun's electric microcar series.

== Overview ==
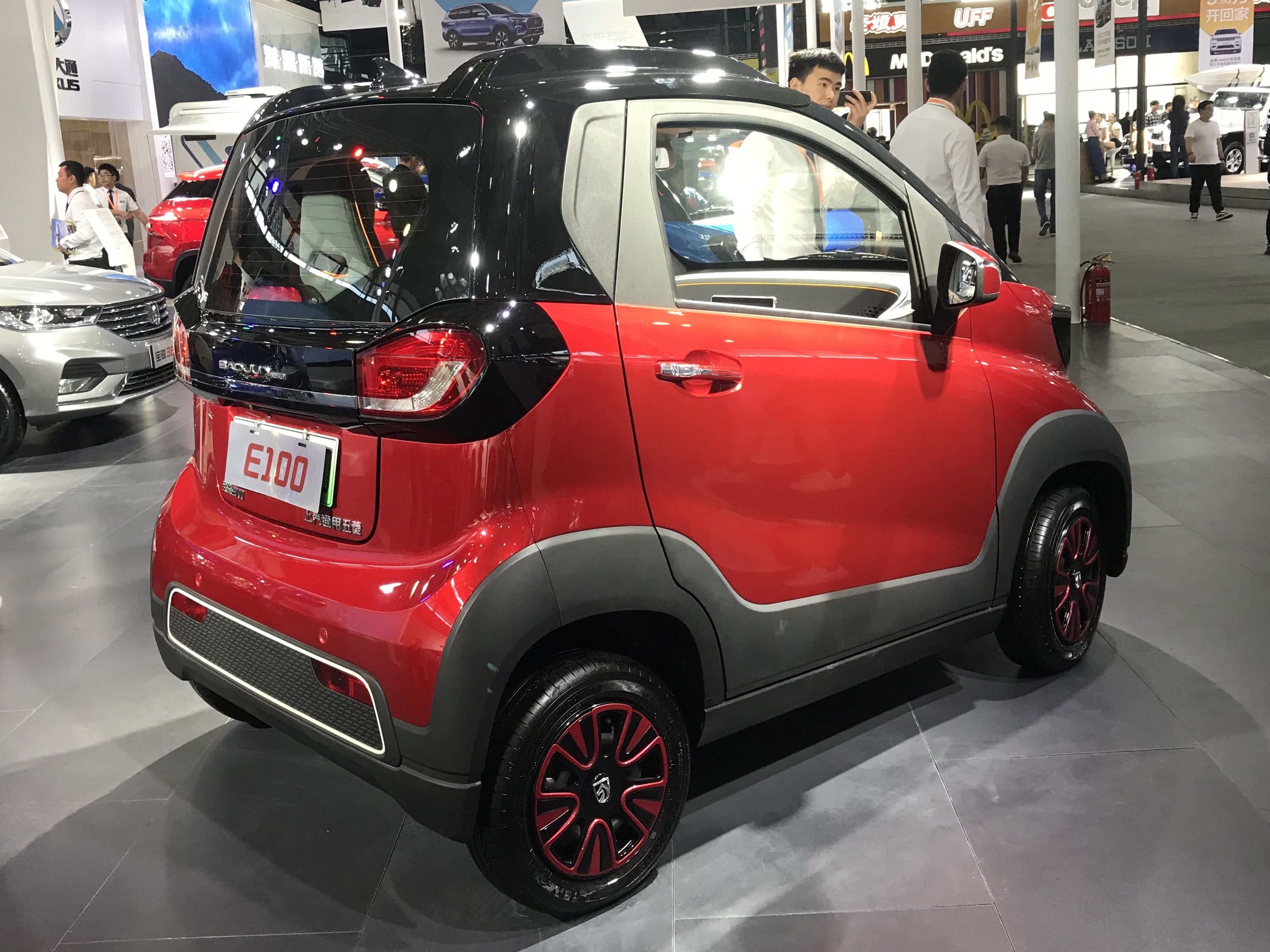
Baojun E100 rear

Baojun, in a General Motors-Chinese joint venture known as SAIC-GM-Wuling, commenced production of the model in 2016. It is the first Baojun electric car. The Baojun E100 was originally only available in Guangxi and Qingdao. Prior to mid-2018, the geographic market for the Baojun E100 was limited to Guanxi province, a southern province bordering Vietnam. However, as of June 2018, Baojun began to expand the E100's market by selling the city car in the Northern province of Shandong, in the area of Qingdao.

The Baojun E100 is powered by a 29 kW and 110 Nm electric motor producing 38 hp and 81 lb-ft torque, capable of a max speed of 100 km (62 miles) per hour. The battery of the E100 is a lithium-ion battery with a battery capacity of 14.9 kWh and can be charged fully in 7.5 hours. For suspension, the E100 uses an independent front-wheel suspension and single-arm rear suspension. The E100 also features anti-lock brakes with electronic brakeforce distribution, electric power steering, and an electronic parking brake. The turning radius of the E100 is 3.7 meters.

=== 2018 update ===
The E100 offered a range of 96 miles at launch in 2016. In June 2018, Baojun refreshed the E100 and it now offered 124 miles of range.

The 2018 E100 came in 2 variants called the Zhixing and the higher trim Zhixiang. The lower Zhixing trim received minor interior upgrades during the 2018 facelift, while the higher-end Zhixiang trim was updated with automatic folding mirrors and a parking camera. After the tech and range updates in 2018, E100 prices were adjusted slightly to RMB 46,800 ($7,257) and RMB 59,800 ($9,275) after subsidies.

== Sales ==
Year	China
2023	2
2024	7
2025	4

== See also ==
- Baojun E200
- Baojun E300
