= Anti–Saccharomyces cerevisiae antibody =

Immune response to yeast

Anti-Saccharomyces cerevisiae
- Antigen isoform: Mannans
- Antigen source: Saccharomyces cerevisiae
- Antigen gene: pro
- Affected organ(s): Large Intestine
- Affected tissue(s): Epithelium
- Associated disease(s): Colitis

Anti-Saccharomyces cerevisiae antibodies (ASCAs) are antibodies against antigens presented by the cell wall of the yeast Saccharomyces cerevisiae. These antibodies are directed against oligomannose sequences α-1,3 Man (α-1,2 Man α-1,2 Man)_{n} (n = 1 or 2). ASCAs and perinuclear antineutrophil cytoplasmic antibodies (pANCAs) are the two most useful and often discriminating biomarkers for colitis. ASCA tends to recognize Crohn's disease more frequently, whereas pANCA tend to recognize ulcerative colitis.

ASCA antibodies react to a yeast protein with mannans, a 200-kDa glycoprotein.

== Diseases ==
Diseases in which ASCA are found include the following:

- Behçet's disease - The association with ASCA is not generally strong, but increased in patients with gastrointestinal symptoms.
- Coeliac disease
- Colitis
  - Ulcerative colitis-familial.
  - Microscopic colitis
    - Collagenous colitis
- Crohn's disease
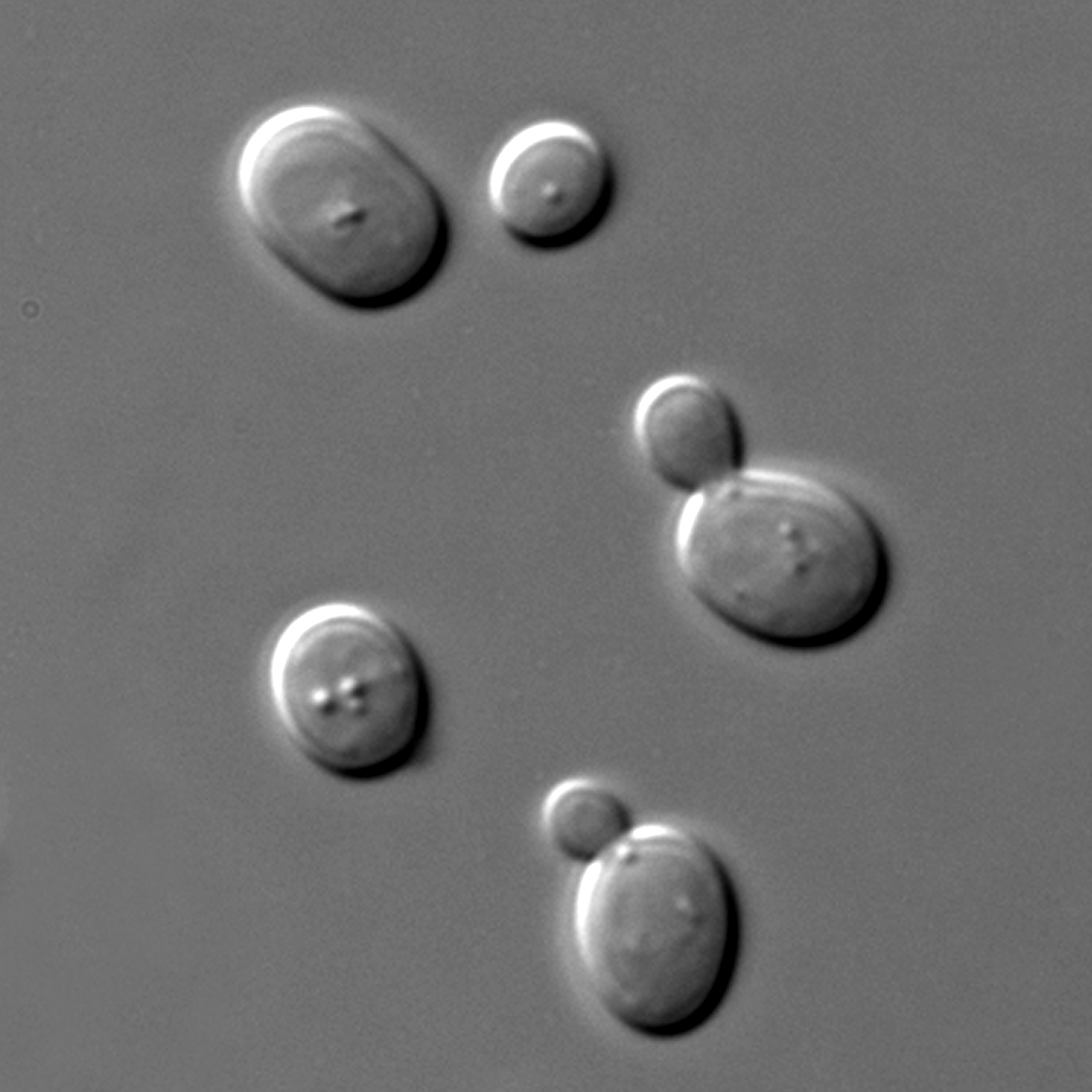
  Yeast S. cerevisiae, the cells are bordered by cell wall that contains the antigen for ASCA

== Intestinal yeast and ASCA positive ==
Intestinal yeast infections are seen in malabsorptive diseases like coeliac disease. In Crohn's disease and ulcerative colitis the presence of intestinal S. cerevisiae is rare, but the association with irritable bowel in coeliac disease remains unstudied.

== Anti-mannans ==
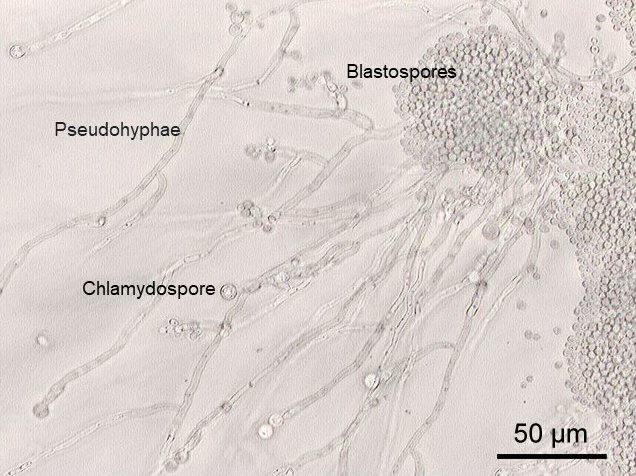
A photomicrograph of Candida albicans showing hyphal outgrowth and other morphological characteristics.

Mannan (oligomannan) is a component of the yeast cell wall. Antibodies to yeast mannans are found at increased frequency in Crohn's disease and ASCA positive Crohn's tend to have lower low levels of mannan-binding lectin. Experimentally, antibodies to mannans from yeast can also crossreact to mannans of other types of yeast. Study of the sugars indicated that a mannotetraose (4-mer) was responsible for highest response. Studies of the 200 kDa glycoprotein antibodies found them commonly in healthy people, suggesting that the disease associated antibodies are to their carbohydrate moieties. Mannans from other yeast, for example candida albicans, have found to cross react with ASCA which suggests that other yeast may induce ASCA associated diseases. ASCA are serological markers of candida albicans infections in humans and animals.

Mannan-binding lectin (MBL) is a lectin produced by humans. In ASCA positive Crohn's disease the serum level of this protein is lower. Cellular response to mannan in ASCA positive peripheral blood lymphocytes could be inhibited by adding MBL, however, a high frequency of mutations in the MBL gene was found in ASCA positive patients. Besides, MBL serum levels were inversely correlated with ASCA levels in Crohn's disease patients with severe clinical phenotypes.

== Crohn's disease ==
ASCA are consistently higher in frequency in Crohn's disease. Yeast cause a three-fold increase in lymphocyte proliferation relative to normal controls. The ASCA antibodies are also more frequently found in familial Crohn's disease. An altered humoral and cellular response to mannan is observed and may be due to a loss of yeast tolerance. This alteration is marked by increased activation markers, CD25/CD69, upon proliferative stimulation of T-helper lymphocytes.

ASCA positive is a predictor for Crohn's disease with high specificity and positive predictive value (87% and 78% respectively). ASCA are associated with proximal (gastroduodenal and small bowel involvement) rather than purely colonic disease (P < 0.001) and with a more severe disease phenotype and requirement for surgery over a median follow-up time of 9 years (P < 0.0001). There is no association between genetic markers for Crohn's disease and NOD2 protein (also known as CARD15) or antibodies to mycoprotein antigen (IgA or IgG), indicating heterogeneous causes for Crohn's disease. Experimental studies show that chemically induced colitis promotes opportunistic human fungal pathogen Candida albicans colonization. In turn, Candida albicans colonization generates ASCA. According to another study, serum samples from patients with invasive candidiasis demonstrated that ASCA levels are significantly elevated compared to healthy controls, but the same, statistically, as of those with Crohn's disease.
