= Maxus D60 =

Mid-size crossover SUV

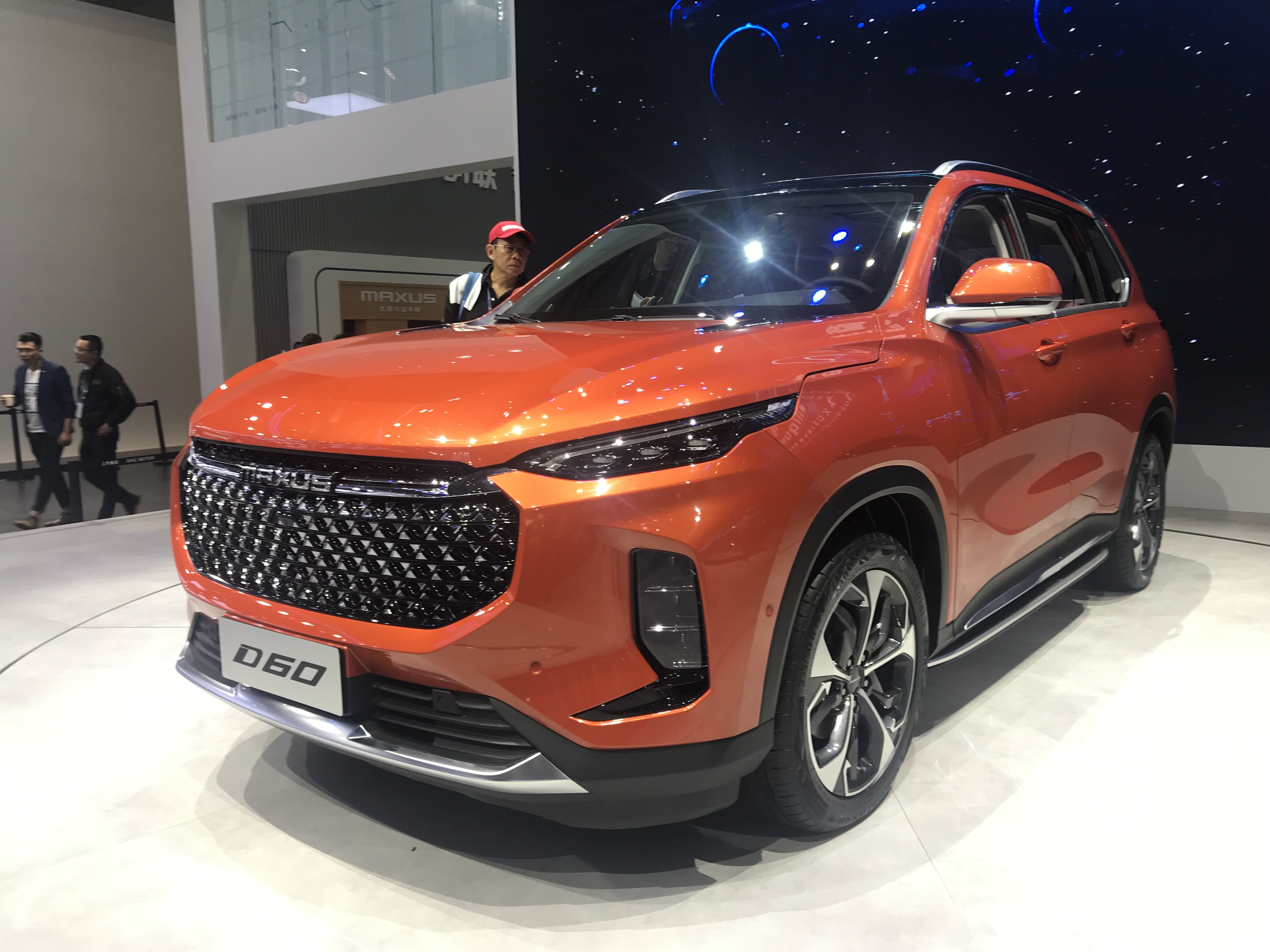

Overview
- Manufacturer: Maxus (SAIC Motor)
- Production: 2019–2024
- Assembly: China: Wuxi

Body and chassis
- Class: Mid-size crossover SUV
- Body style: 5-door SUV
- Layout: Front-engine, Front wheel drive Front-motor, front-wheel-drive (Electric); Front-engine, Four wheel drive

Powertrain
- Engine: 1.3 L LI6 I4 turbo petrol; 1.3 L LI6 I4 turbo (petrol/plug-in hybrid); 1.5 L 15E4E I4 turbo petrol
- Electric motor: 177 PS (175 hp; 130 kW) High-power Permanent Magnet Synchronous Motor (Euniq 6); 82 PS Permanent Magnet Synchronous Motor (Euniq 6); 160–190 PS (158–187 hp; 118–140 kW) Permanent Magnet Synchronous Motor (Mifa 6)
- Transmission: 6-speed manual 7-speed DCT
- Hybrid drivetrain: Plug-in hybrid (D60e / Euniq 6 / Mifa 6)
- Battery: PHEV: 13 kWh Li-ion; EV: 52 or 70 kWh Li-ion (Euniq 6); 61 or 70 kWh Li-ion (Mifa 6)

Dimensions
- Wheelbase: 2,760 mm (108.7 in)
- Length: 4,720 mm (185.8 in)
- Width: 1,860 mm (73.2 in)
- Height: 1,736 mm (68.3 in)
- Curb weight: 1,545 kg (3,406 lb)

The Maxus D60 is a mid-size crossover SUV produced by Chinese automaker SAIC under the sub-brand Maxus from 2019 to 2024.

== Overview ==
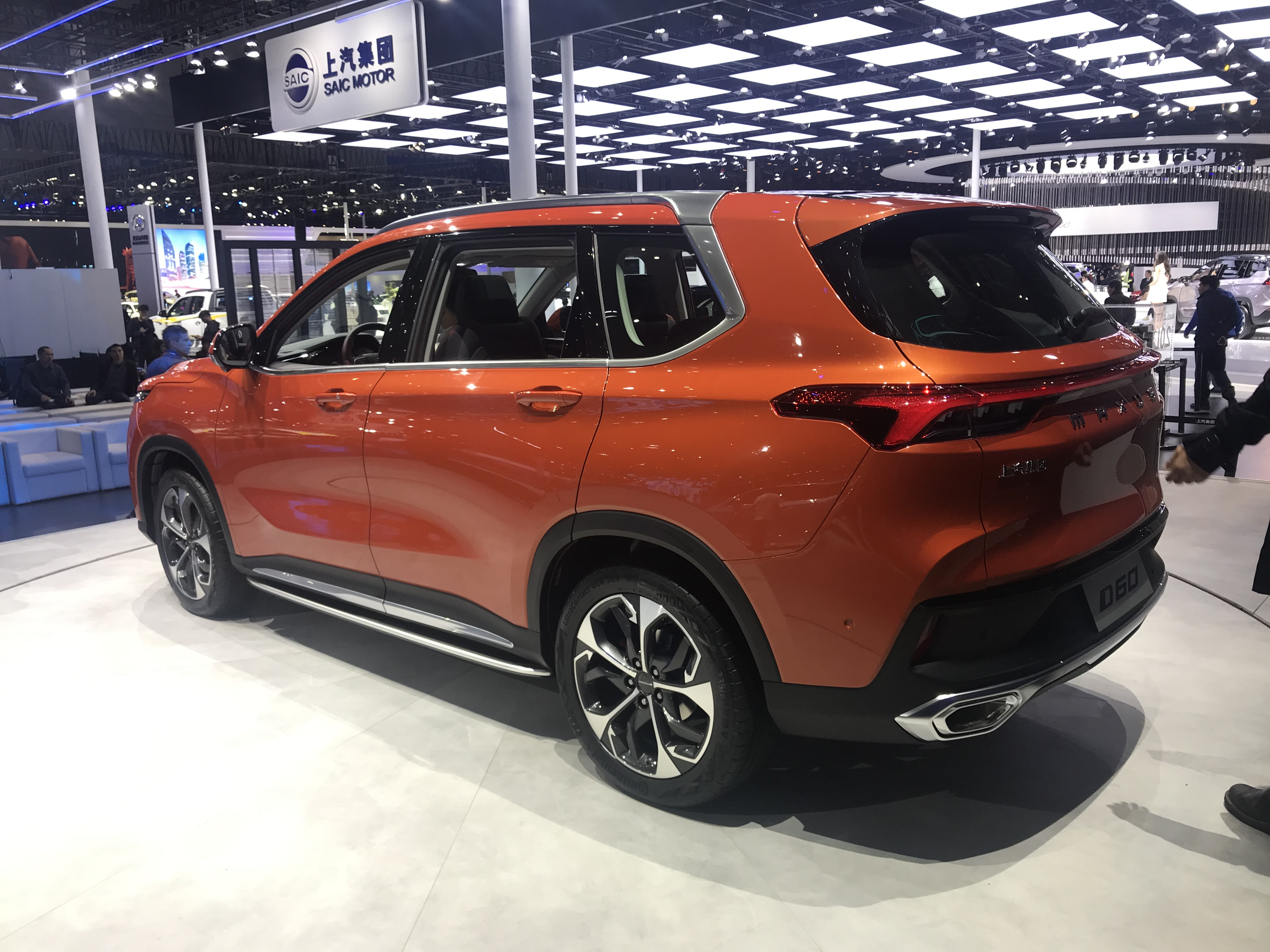
Rear view

Previewed by the Maxus Tarantula concept revealed during the 2018 Beijing Auto Show, the Maxus D60 debuted on February 28, 2019, and was first shown to the general public during the 2019 Shanghai Auto Show. The D60 is available in 5-seater and 7-seater models with 2+3, 2+2+2, and 2+3+2 seating configurations.

== Specifications ==
The Maxus D60 is capable of Level 2.5 semi-autonomous driving including cruise control and driverless parking systems equipped. The D60 comes with a 1.5 litre turbocharged petrol engine producing 169 hp (126 kW; 171 PS) and 250 N⋅m (184 lb⋅ft; 25.5 kg⋅m) and a 1.3 litre turbocharged petrol engine producing 163 hp (122 kW; 165 PS) and 230 N⋅m (170 lb⋅ft; 23.5 kg⋅m). Transmission options include a 6-speed manual transmission and 7-speed DCT.

== Maxus D60e / Maxus Euniq 6 (2019–2023) ==
A plug-in hybrid version of the Maxus D60 called the Maxus D60e and later Maxus Euniq 6 was also revealed during the 2019 Shanghai Auto Show. The exterior styling is largely the same as the petrol-powered version while subtle blue accents were added in the headlamps, grilles, and intakes.

According to Maxus officials, the Maxus Euniq 6 is equipped with CATL ternary lithium battery, and the NEDC comprehensive working range will be up to 372 mi (599 km).

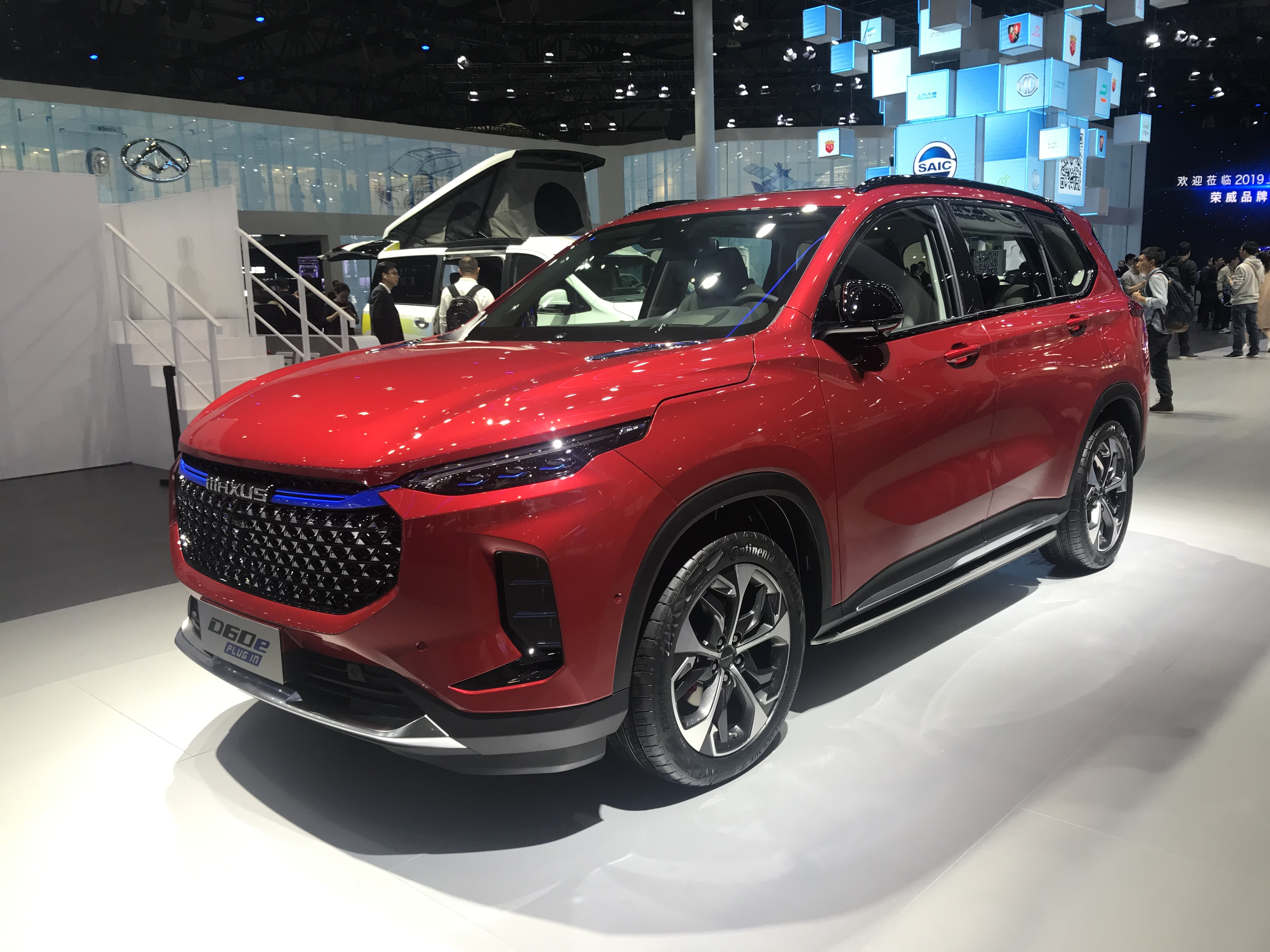
Maxus D60e

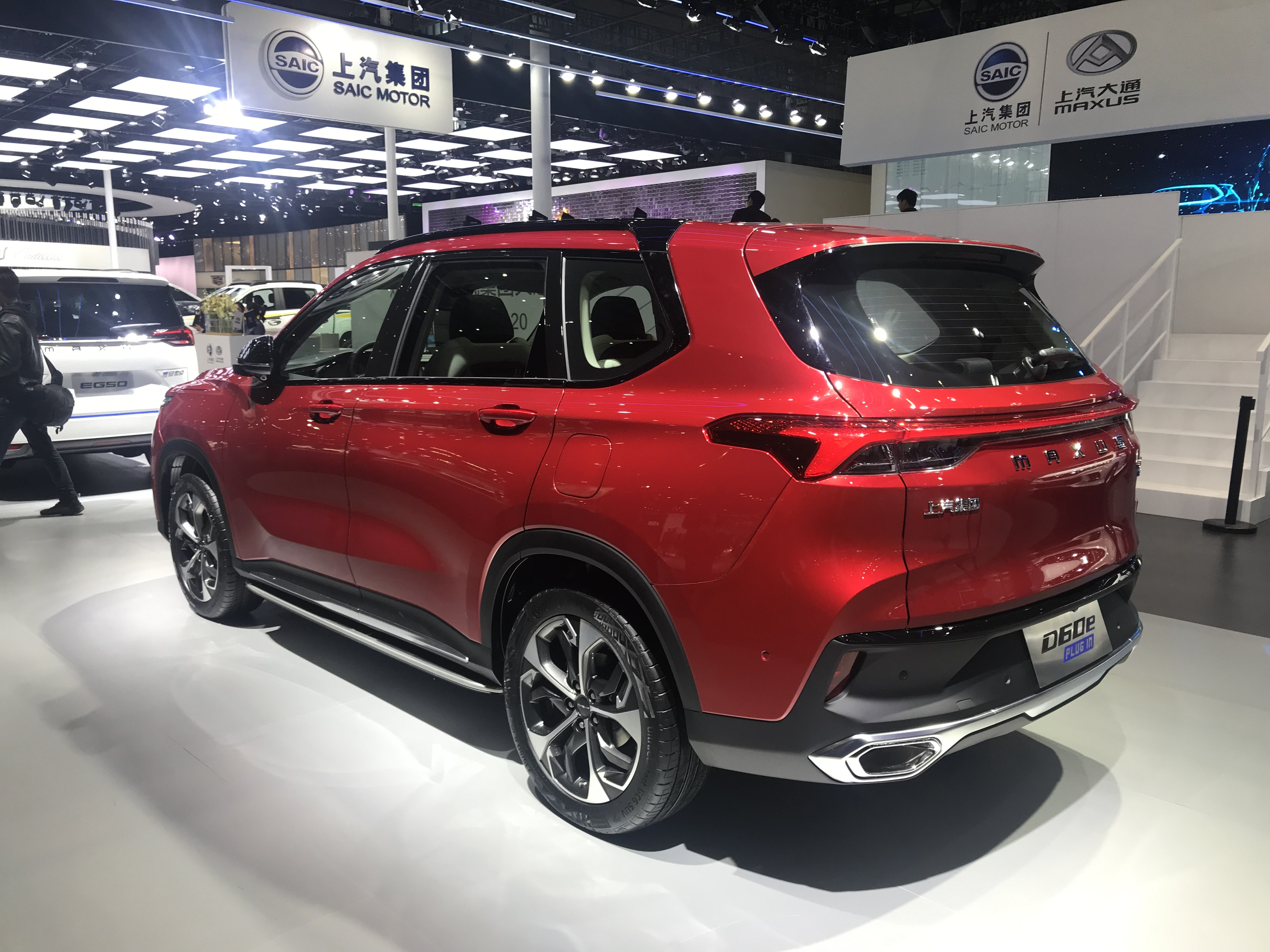
Rear view

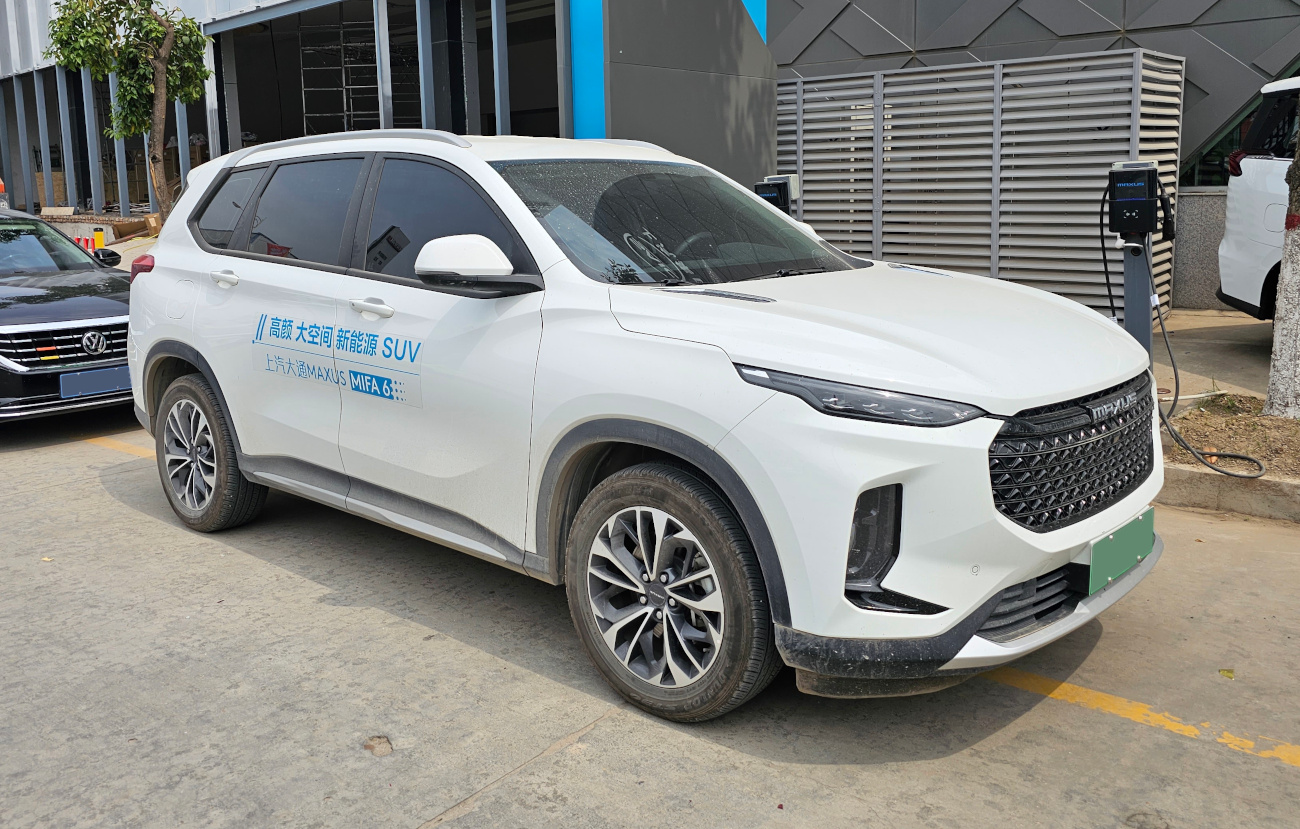
Maxus Euniq 6

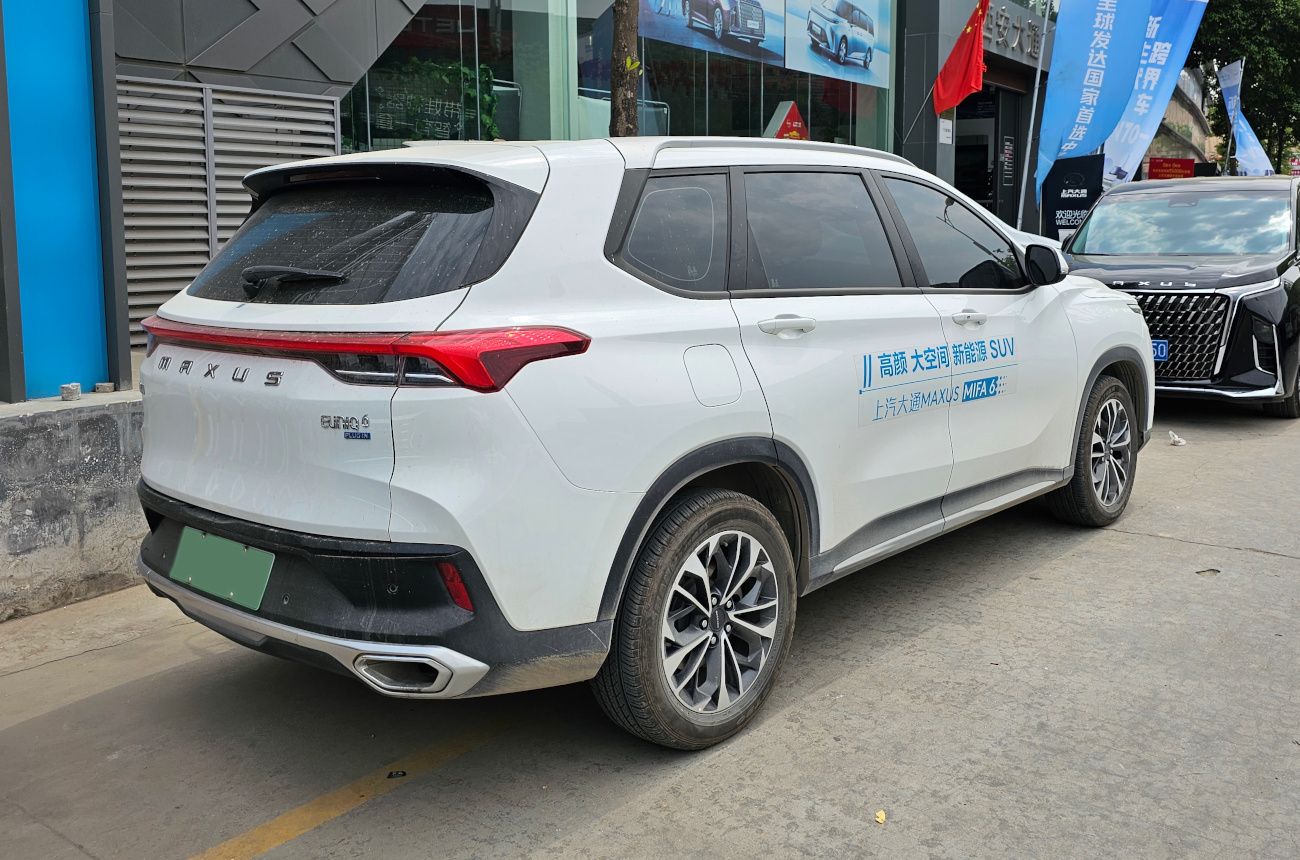
Rear view

== Maxus Mifa 6 (2023–2024) ==
The Maxus Mifa 6 was introduced 2023. The Maxus Mifa 6 is also an electric version of the petrol-powered Maxus D60, and was launched to replace the Euniq 6 phased out in 2023.
