= Maxus EV30 =

Battery electric van

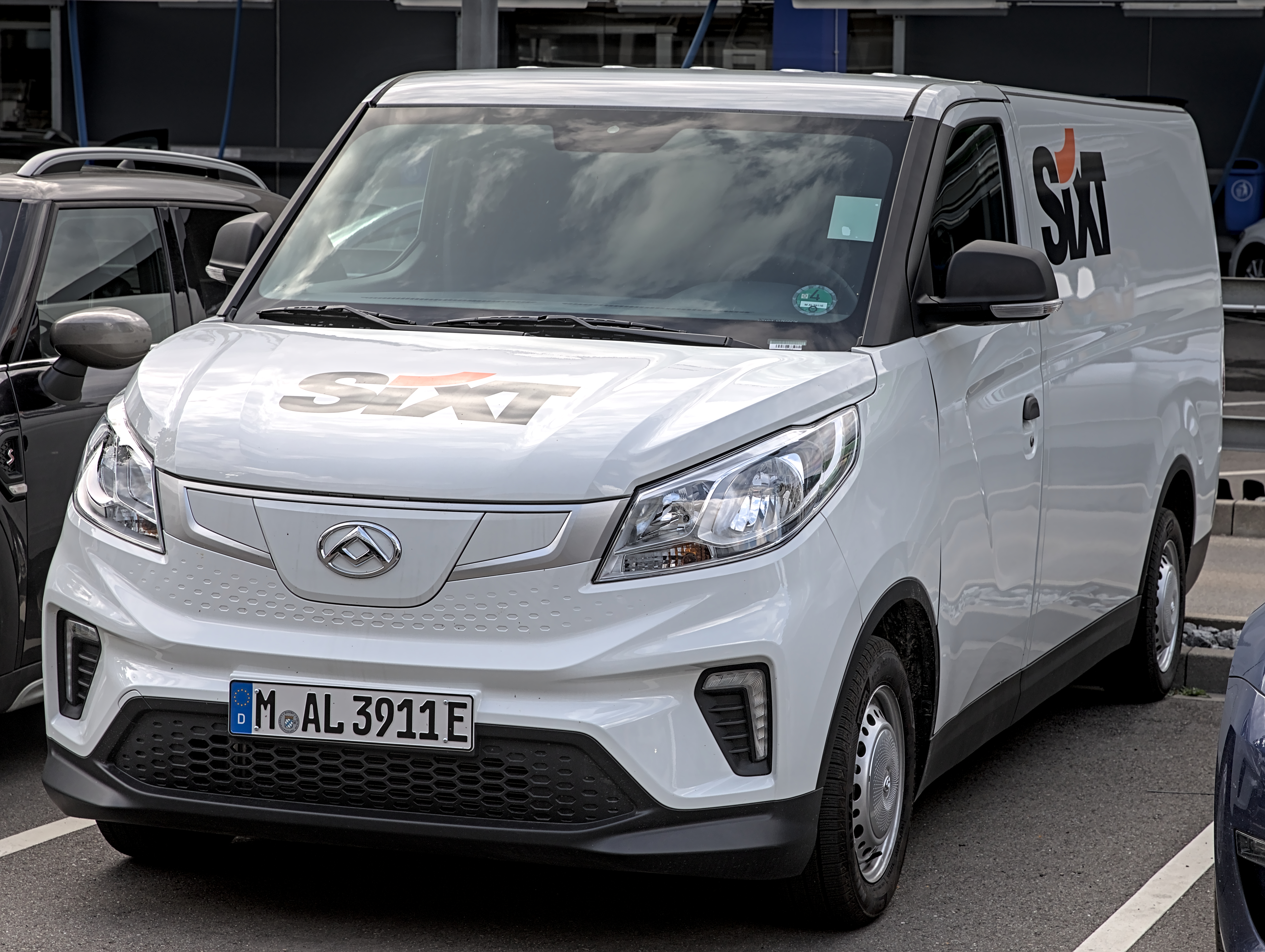

Overview
- Manufacturer: Maxus (SAIC Motor)
- Also called: Maxus eDeliver 3 (electric version); LDV EV30 (electric version in New Zealand)
- Production: 2018–2026 (China); 2020–present (export)
- Assembly: China: Wuxi
- Designer: Xiaofei Qu

Body and chassis
- Class: Light commercial vehicle
- Body style: 4-door van
- Layout: Front-engine, front-wheel-drive

Powertrain
- Electric motor: Permanent magnet synchronous electric motor
- Power output: 70 kW (95.2 PS; 93.9 hp); 90 kW (122.4 PS; 120.7 hp); 100 kW (136.0 PS; 134.1 hp); 118 kW (160.4 PS; 158.2 hp) (Export; Global)
- Transmission: 1-speed direct-drive
- Battery: Li-ion battery: 35-52.5 kWh
- Electric range: 235 km (147 mi); 158-241 km (98-150 mi) (Maxus eDeliver 3, UK market)

Dimensions
- Wheelbase: SWB: 2,910 mm (114.6 in); LWB: 3,285 mm (129.3 in)
- Length: SWB: 4,500 mm (177.2 in); LWB: 5,100 mm (200.8 in)
- Width: 1,780 mm (70.1 in)
- Height: 1,895 mm (74.6 in)
- Curb weight: 1,420 kg (3,131 lb)

The Maxus EV30 is a battery electric van designed and produced by the Chinese automaker Maxus since 2018.

== Overview ==
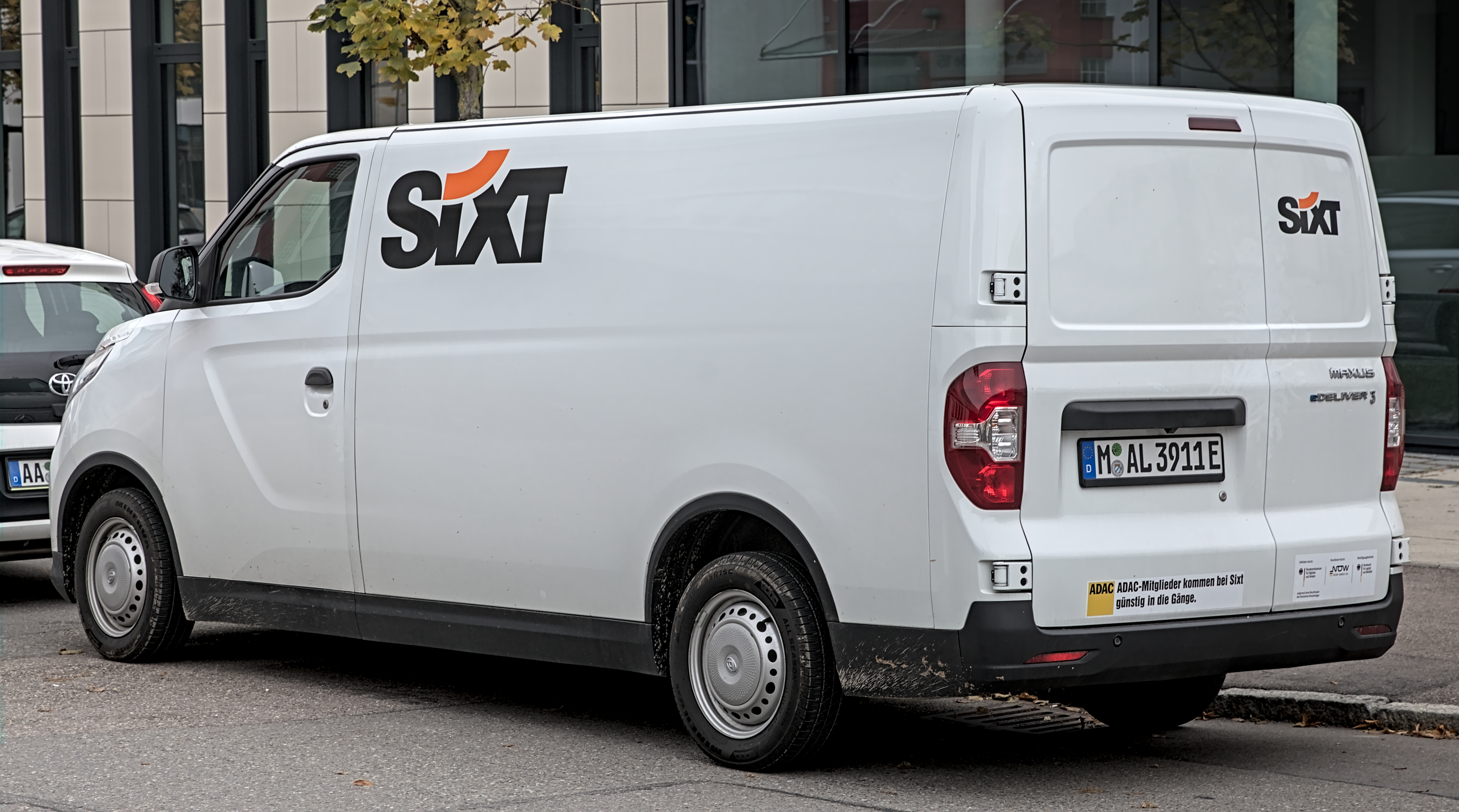
Rear view

The Maxus EV30 was launched on the Chinese car market in January 2019 as a mid-size electric distribution van of the Maxus brand.

== Specifications ==
The Maxus EV30 is a standard 2-seater panel van and is equipped with a powertrain that produces 121 hp (90 kW) of power and 220 N.m (162 lb.ft) of torque powering the front wheels. The EV30 is capable of a top speed of 120 km/h (75 mph), and accelerates to 100 km/h in 12 seconds. The EV30 for the Chinese market is a pure electric vehicle (BEV) that is equipped with a 35 kWh battery mounted under the load floor and delivering a range of 235 km (147 miles) rated by NEDC.

As a purpose-built electric van design, the EV30 is complete with aluminum monocoque construction and a composite front end. The EV30 has a ground clearance of 145 mm (6.0 inches), and comes standard with 15-inch steel wheels. The maximum payload capacity for the Chinese market model is 830 kg (1,830 lbs) and the load volume is 5 cubic meters. As of 2019, pricing for the Maxus EV30 in China ranges from 128,700 to 144,900 yuan before incentives. The EV30 is equipped with a MacPherson strut and leaf-spring configuration that is more focused on load taking.

In selected markets, the EV30 would be offered in both short and long-wheelbase EV30L variants which carry 4.8 and 6.3 cubic meters respectively. The short and long-wheelbase variants are equivalent to traditional small and medium-van segments. The short-wheelbase variant measures 4.5m with a payload of 905 kg and the long-wheelbase variant increased the wheelbase by 375mm and reached a length of 5.1m with a payload of 1,020 kg.

== Interior features ==
There were no options for trim levels for the EV30's interior available. The interior has standard equipment including air conditioning, electric windows, USB & Bluetooth connectivity, storage, cup holders, adjustable electric door mirrors, a multifunction steering wheel, and an eight-inch touchscreen infotainment system with support for Apple CarPlay and Android Auto for export models. Additionally, a reverse camera with rear parking sensors, cruise control, six cargo bay floor-mounted strapping rings and a cargo bay solid partition with a glass panel option to separate the cabin.

== Overseas markets ==
=== United Kingdom ===
The Maxus EV30 is sold as the Maxus eDeliver 3 in the UK starting in 2020. Compared to the Chinese EV30, the eDeliver 3 is a right-hand drive and features barn doors for the tailgate. The Maxus eDeliver 3 vans were exported from China, and the UK is the first export market to launch the vehicle.

There are two battery packs offered on the eDeliver 3 for the UK; a 35kWh and a 52.5kWh, returning a range of 98 miles and 150 miles respectively rated via the NEDC cycle. A rapid charge to around 90% of the battery takes 45 minutes, while a Type 2 full battery charge would take seven hours. Three-wheelbase variants are available in the UK which include a short or long-wheelbase panel van and an extended-wheelbase platform chassis. The short-wheelbase variant has a cargo volume of 4.8 cubic meters and a maximum payload capacity of 905 kg, while the long-wheelbase variant offers 6.3 cubic meters and 1,020 kg. Prices for the eDeliver 3 in the UK start from £30,000 ex. VAT (£22,800 with the plug-in van grant, ex. VAT).

=== New Zealand ===
In New Zealand, the Maxus EV30 is sold as the LDV eDeliver 3.

=== Greece ===
In Greece, the Maxus EV30 is sold as the Maxus eDeliver 3.
