= Maxus =

Chinese vehicle brand

SAIC Maxus Automotive Co., Ltd.
- Type: Subsidiary
- Industry: Automotive
- Founded: 21 March 2011; 15 years ago
- Headquarters: Shanghai, China
- Area served: Worldwide
- Products: Automobiles
- Brands: Maxus; LDV (Australia and New Zealand)
- Parent: SAIC Motor
- Website: www.saicmaxus.com

Maxus
- Simplified Chinese: 上汽大通汽车有限公司
- Traditional Chinese: 上汽大通汽車有限公司
- Literal meaning: Shanghai Automotive "Great Transportation" Automobile Co., Ltd.
Transcriptions
Standard Mandarin
- Hanyu Pinyin: Shàngqì dàtōng qìchē yǒuxiàn gōngsī

Abbreviation
- Simplified Chinese: 大通汽车
- Traditional Chinese: 大通汽車
- Literal meaning: "Great Transportation" Automotive
Transcriptions
Standard Mandarin
- Hanyu Pinyin: dàtōng qìchē

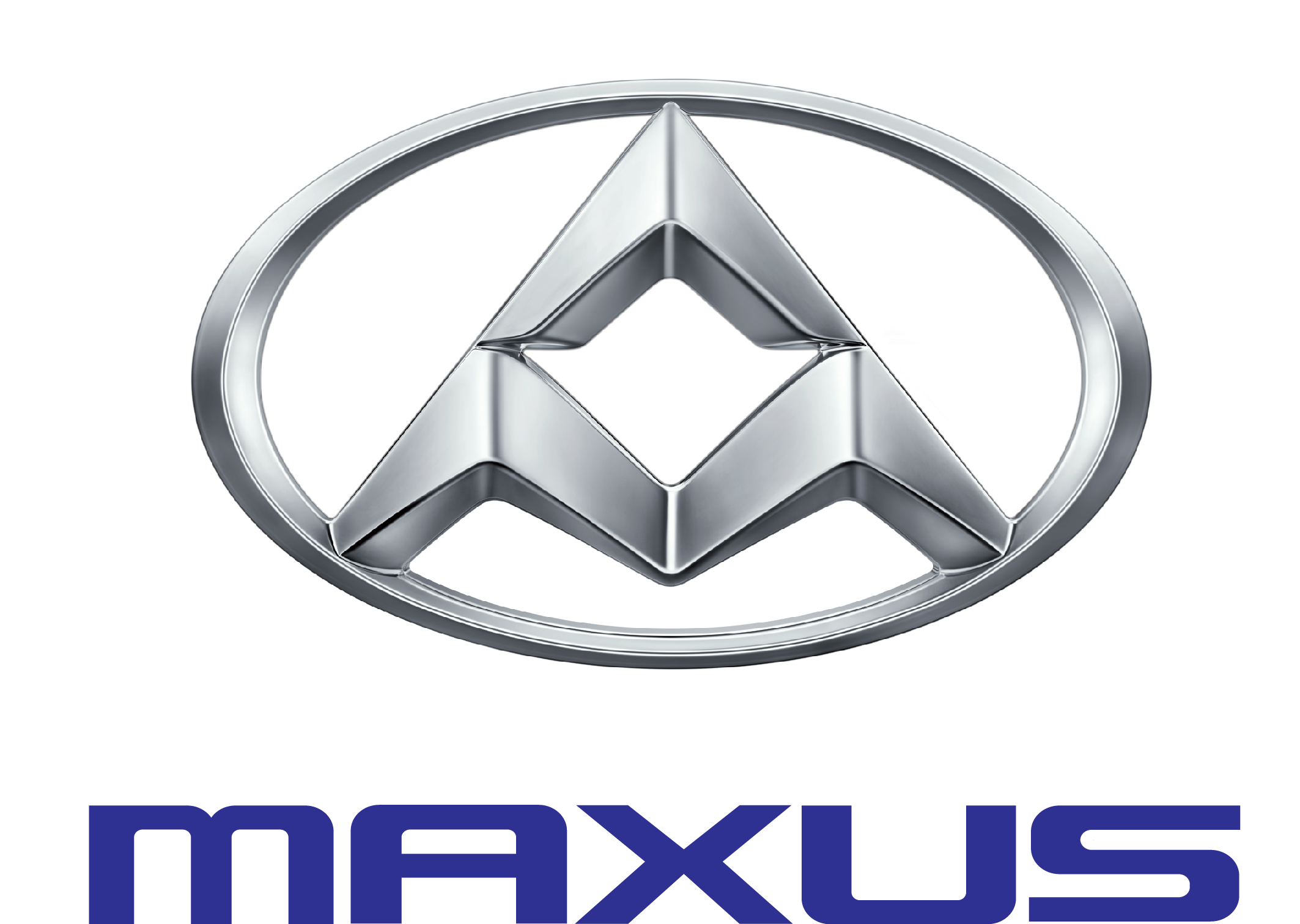
Maxus logo until 2025

SAIC Maxus Automotive Co., Ltd. trading as Maxus (LDV in Australia, New Zealand, and South Africa) and sometimes known by the pinyin transcription of its Chinese name, Datong (大通) is a Chinese vehicle brand. Currently, it is a commercial and passenger vehicle manufacturer being a wholly owned subsidiary of SAIC Motor, which owns other brands such as MG and Roewe.

== Name ==
The brand Maxus originates from the LDV Maxus model of the defunct British commercial vehicle manufacturer LDV Group, following the acquisition of LDV's intellectual property by SAIC in 2010. The LDV brand continues to be used in Australia, South Africa, and New Zealand, while in the UK and Ireland, LDV was rebranded to Maxus in 2020.

== History ==
The first Maxus product, the V80 van, was unveiled at the Auto Shanghai motor show in April 2011. In the same month SAIC signed an agreement appointing the Malaysia-based WestStar group as the official distributor of the V80 for the Asia Pacific region. The inauguration ceremony of the V80 was held in Shanghai on 29 June 2011. The sale of Maxus vehicles in Australasia began in 2012, with distribution by the Australia-based WMC Group. In September 2013 it was announced that Maxus vehicles would be sold in Thailand starting in 2014, as part of a deal between SAIC and SAIC Motor-CP Co.

Since April 2013, Kauffman Group-subsidiary Andes Motor is the official distributor of the Maxus brand for Chile. Chile became the first foreign market to sell the T60 pick up truck in July 2017, where it has seen successful sales, becoming in just a year the 10th most sold pick up truck in Chile, outpacing all Chinese competitors according to the National Automotive Association of Chile and prompting Andes Motor to expand its Maxus dealership network around the country.

In October 2013, Maxus was introduced to Saudi Arabia via Haji Husein Alireza & Co. Ltd.

Maxus's second production model, the G10 MPV, went on sale in China in March 2014. In the same month, Maxus was introduced to Iran, Syria and the UAE.

On December 14, 2015, Maxus was launched officially in Hong Kong with the V80 and the G10 being sold in cooperation with the Inchcape Group. The brand was launched in Singapore on December 17, 2015, in conjunction with Cycle & Carriage as the official distributor, which was also the official vehicle sponsor for the 8th ASEAN Para Games 2015 event.

On October 2, 2018, Ayala Corporation announced that AC Motors is the official distributor of Maxus vehicles in the Philippines.

On 6 November 2023, SAIC Maxus officially unveiled its new light bus brand, "Xintu".

== Products ==
=== Current ===
The current Maxus range comprises the following models:

==== D series (SUVs) ====
- Maxus D90 (2017–2022)
  - Maxus Territory, luxury variant of D90 (2022–present)

==== G series (MPVs) ====
- Maxus G10 (2014–present)
  - Maxus RG10, RV based on G10 (2019–present)
  - Maxus EG10, electric variant of G10 (2016–present)
- Maxus G50 (2018–present)
  - Maxus Mifa 5, electric variant of G50 (2022–2024)
  - Maxus Euniq 5, electric variant of G50 (2019–2023)
- Maxus G70 (2023–present)
  - Maxus Mifa 7 (2023–present)
- Maxus G90 (2022–present)
  - Maxus Mifa 9 (2021–present)

==== T series (trucks) ====
- Maxus T60 (2016–present)
- Maxus T70 (2019–present)
- Maxus T90 (2021–present)
- Maxus Terron 9 (2025–present)
  - Maxus eTerron 9 (2024–present), BEV variant
- Maxus Dana T1 (2025–present), a rebadged Yuejin Chaoyue H

==== V series (Vans) ====
- Maxus Dana V1 (2023–present)
  - Maxus Dana M1, passenger variant of Dana V1 (2023–present)
- Maxus EV30 (2018–present)
- Maxus V70 (2022–present)
  - Maxus EV70, electric variant of V70 (2023–2026)
- Maxus V80 (2011–present)
  - Maxus RV80, RV based on V80 (2016–present)
  - Maxus EV80, electric variant of V80 (2014–present)
  - Maxus FCV80, extended variant of V80
  - Maxus SV62 V80 chassis
- Maxus V90 (2019–present)

==== RVs ====
- Maxus V100, based on the V90
- Maxus V80
- Maxus H90, based on the Iveco Daily Ousheng
- Maxus T90

=== Former ===
- Maxus D60 (2019–2024)
  - Maxus Mifa 6, electric variant of D60 (2023–2024)
  - Maxus Euniq 6, electric variant of D60 (2019–2023)
- Maxus G20 (2019–2025)
  - Maxus Mifa, hydrogen variant of G20 (2022–2023)
  - Maxus Euniq 7, electric variant of G20 (2020–2023)
- Maxus Istana
- Maxus LD100

=== Concepts ===
- Maxus Tarantula SUV (2017)
- Maxus Tarantula (2017)
- Maxus D60 Concept (2018)
- Maxus Concept Pickup (2020)
- Maxus Mifa (2021)
- Maxus GST quad-motor pickup truck (2023)

== Gallery ==
=== Current ===
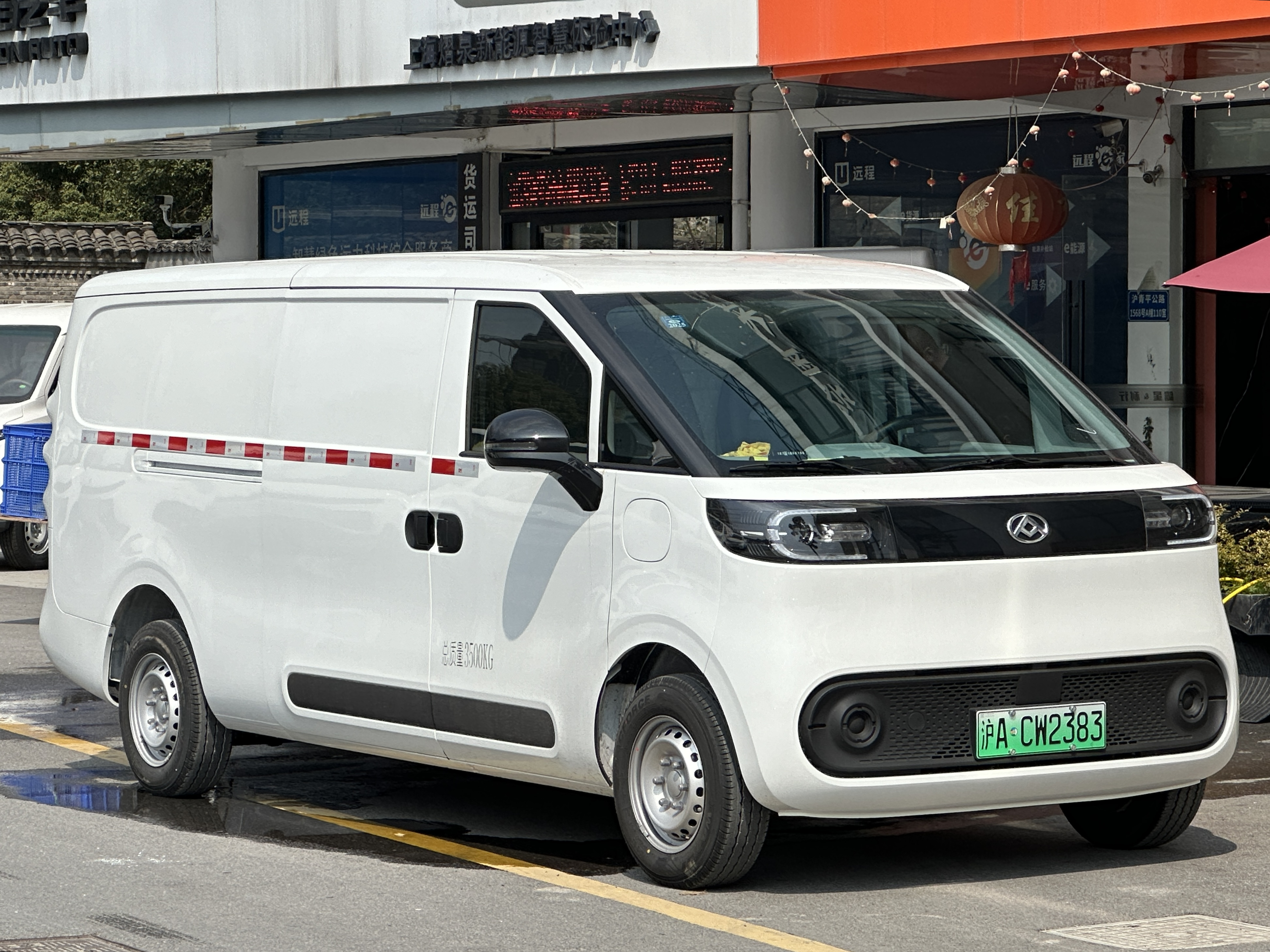
Maxus Dana V1 (2024–present)

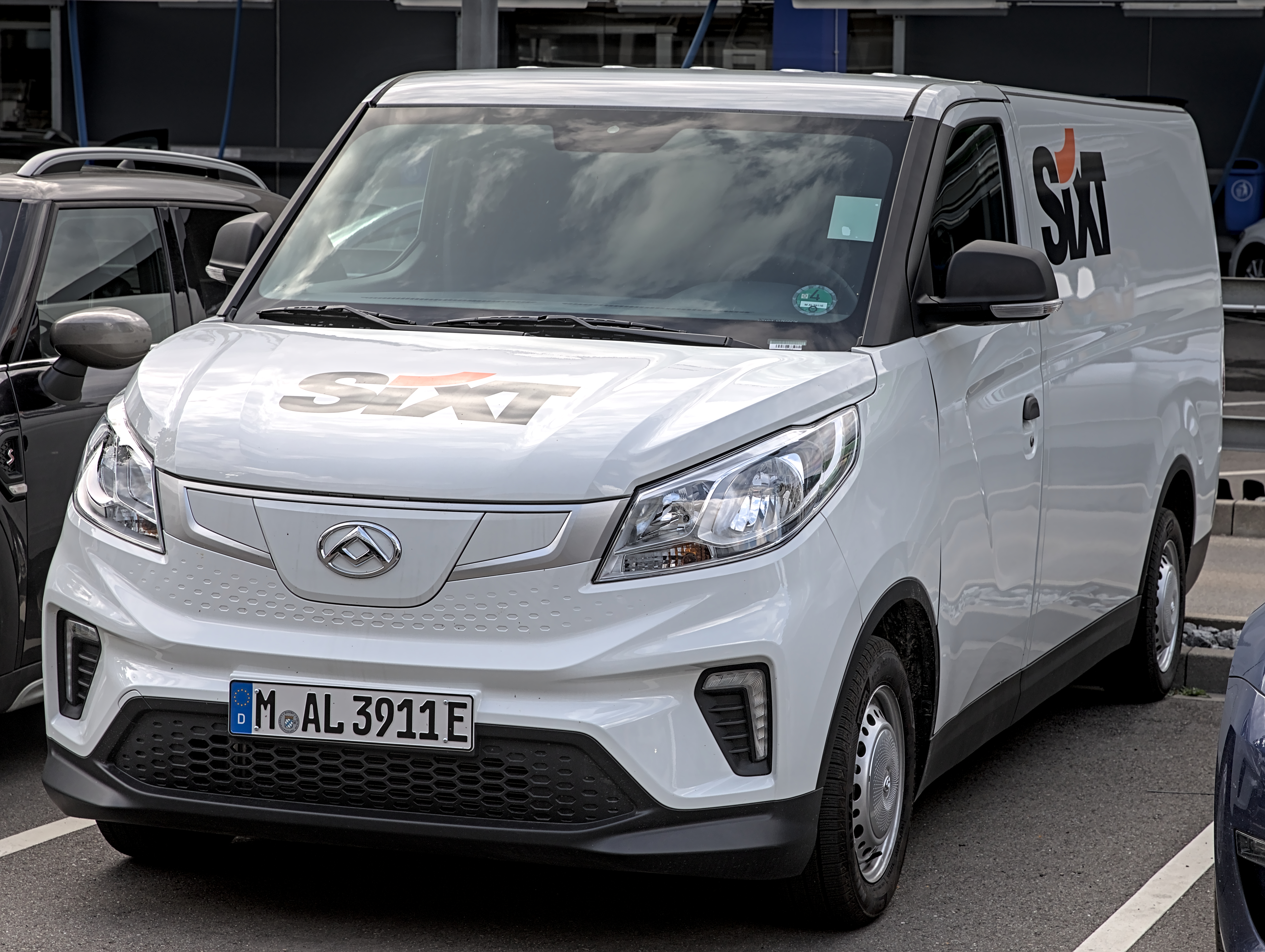
Maxus EV30 (2019–present)

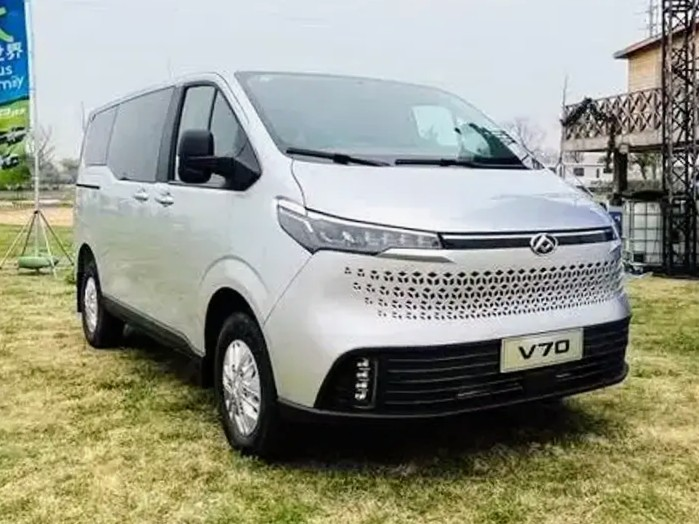
Maxus V70 (2022–present)

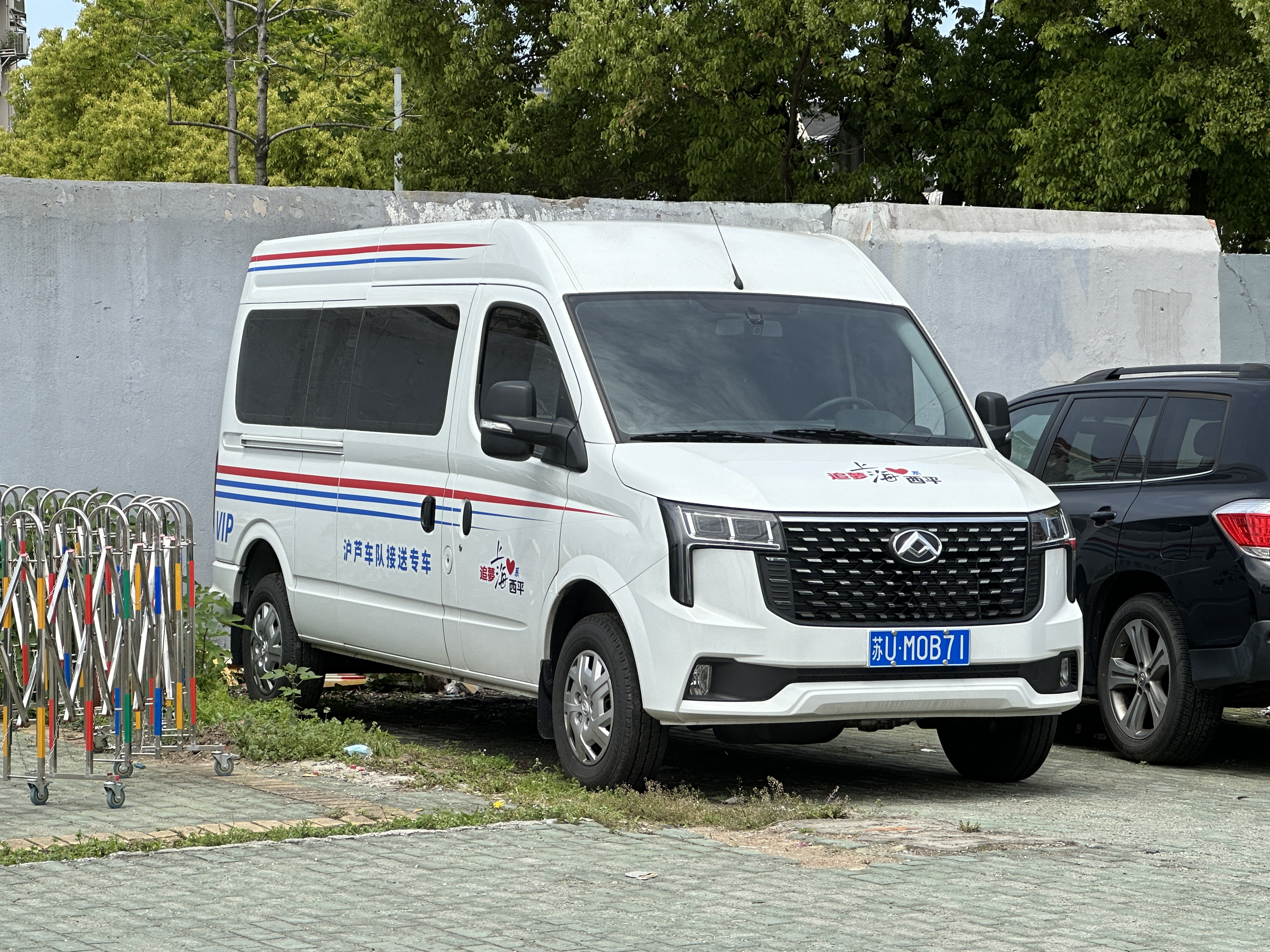
Maxus V80 (2011–present)

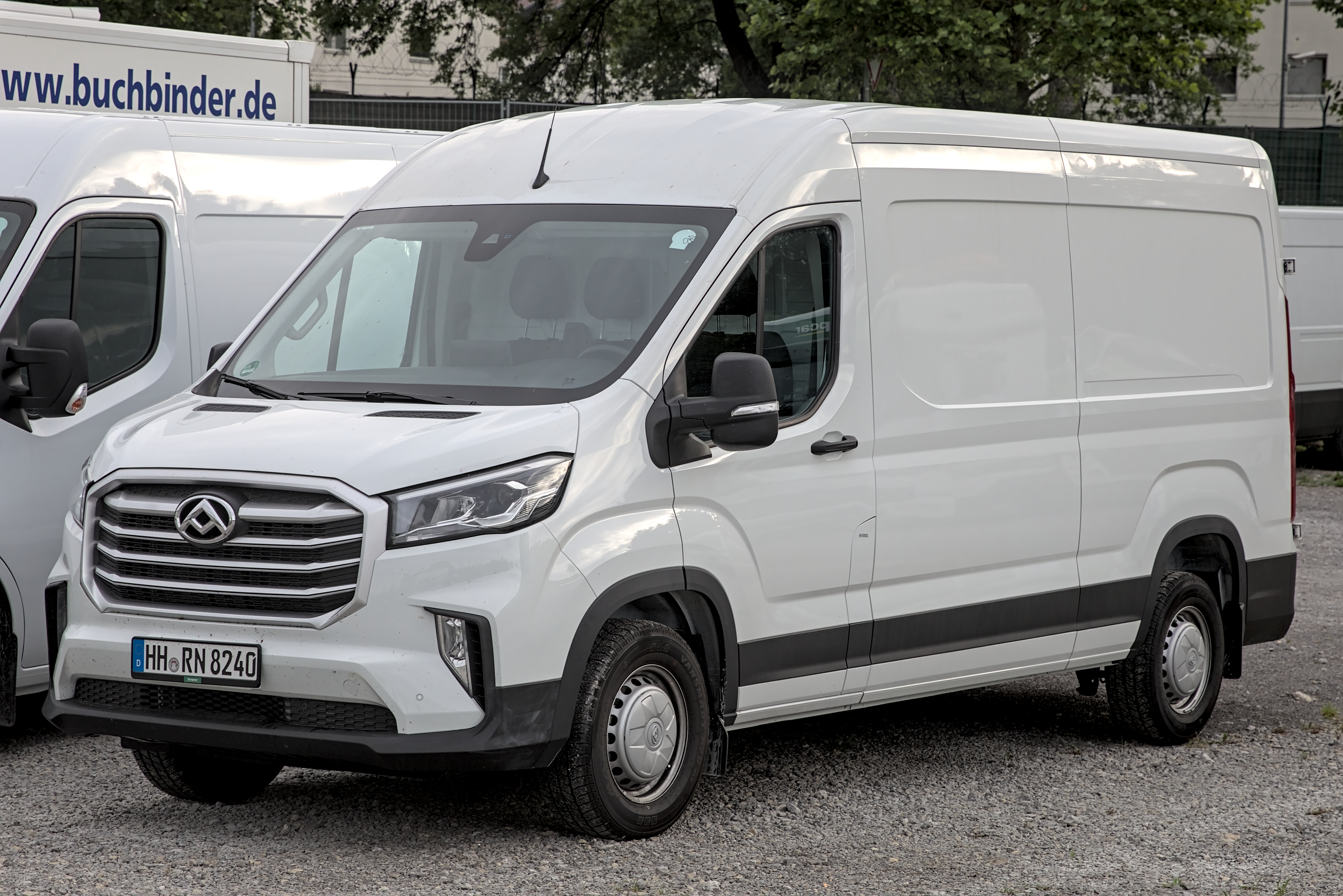
Maxus V90 (2019–present)

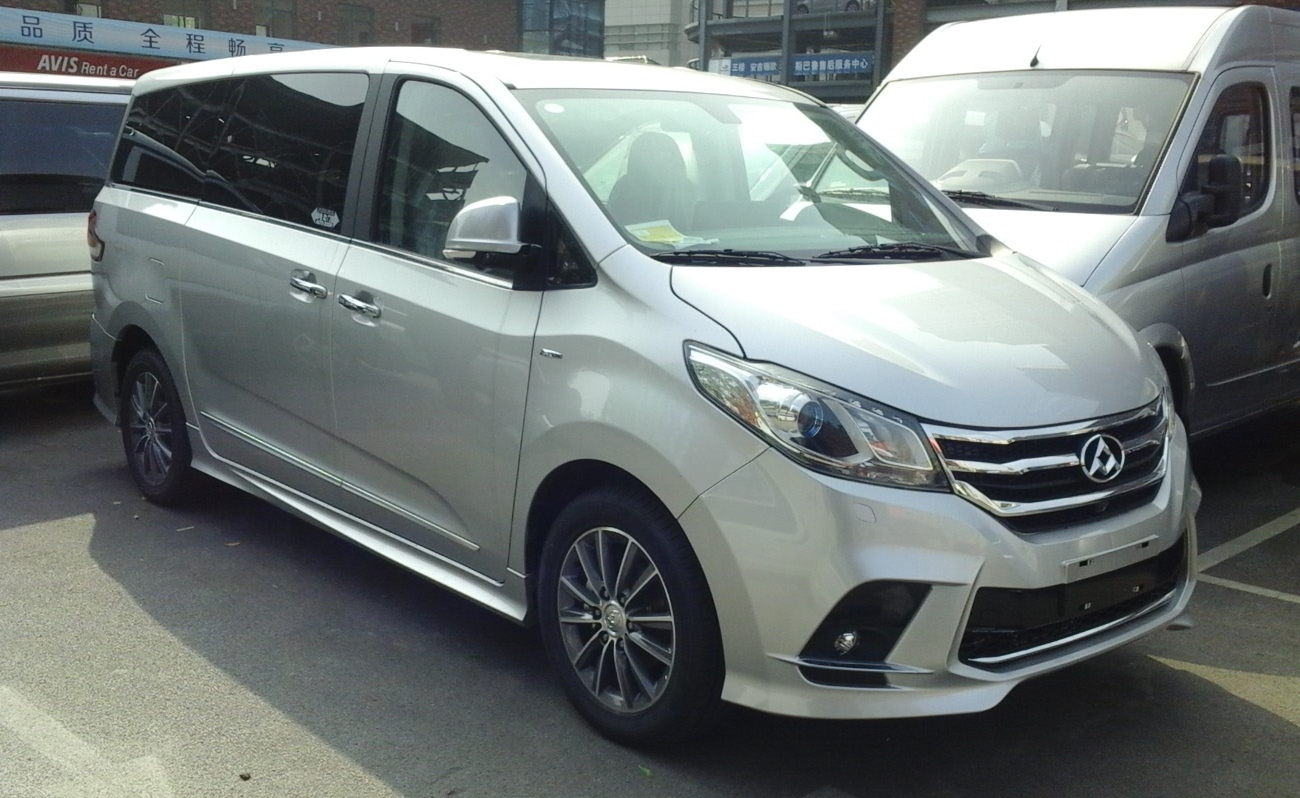
Maxus G10 (2014–present)

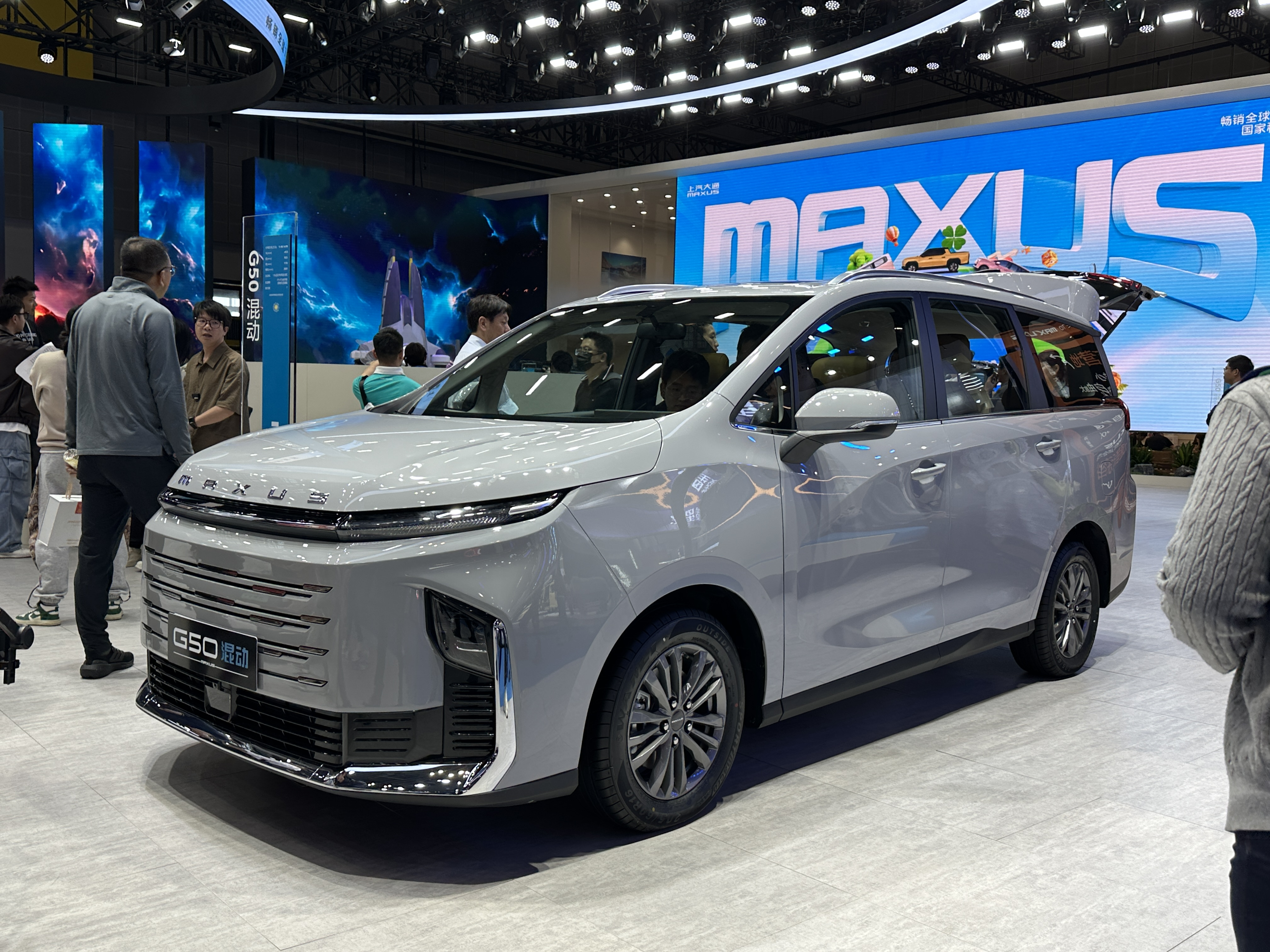
Maxus G50 (2019–present)

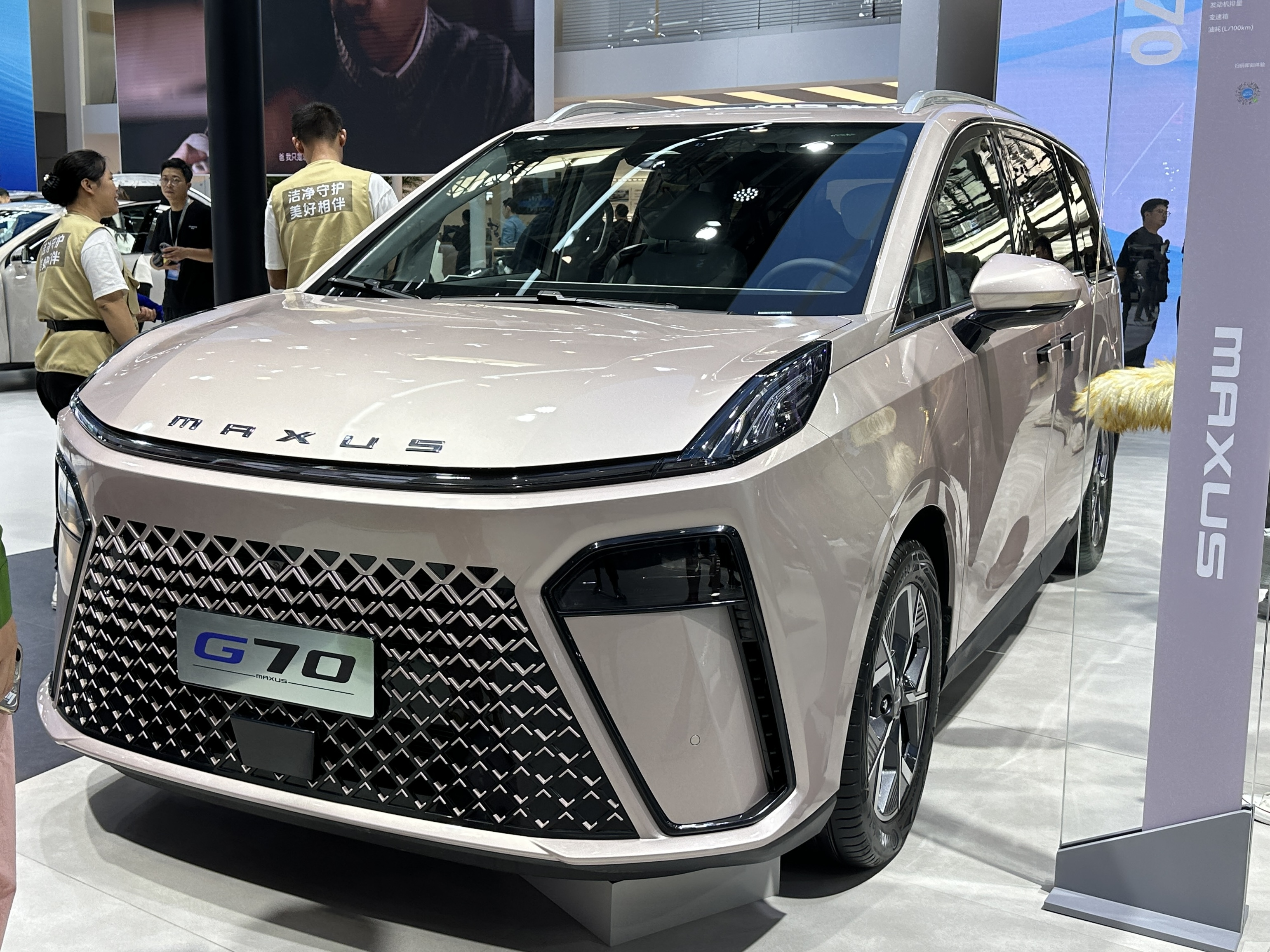
Maxus G70 (2023–present)

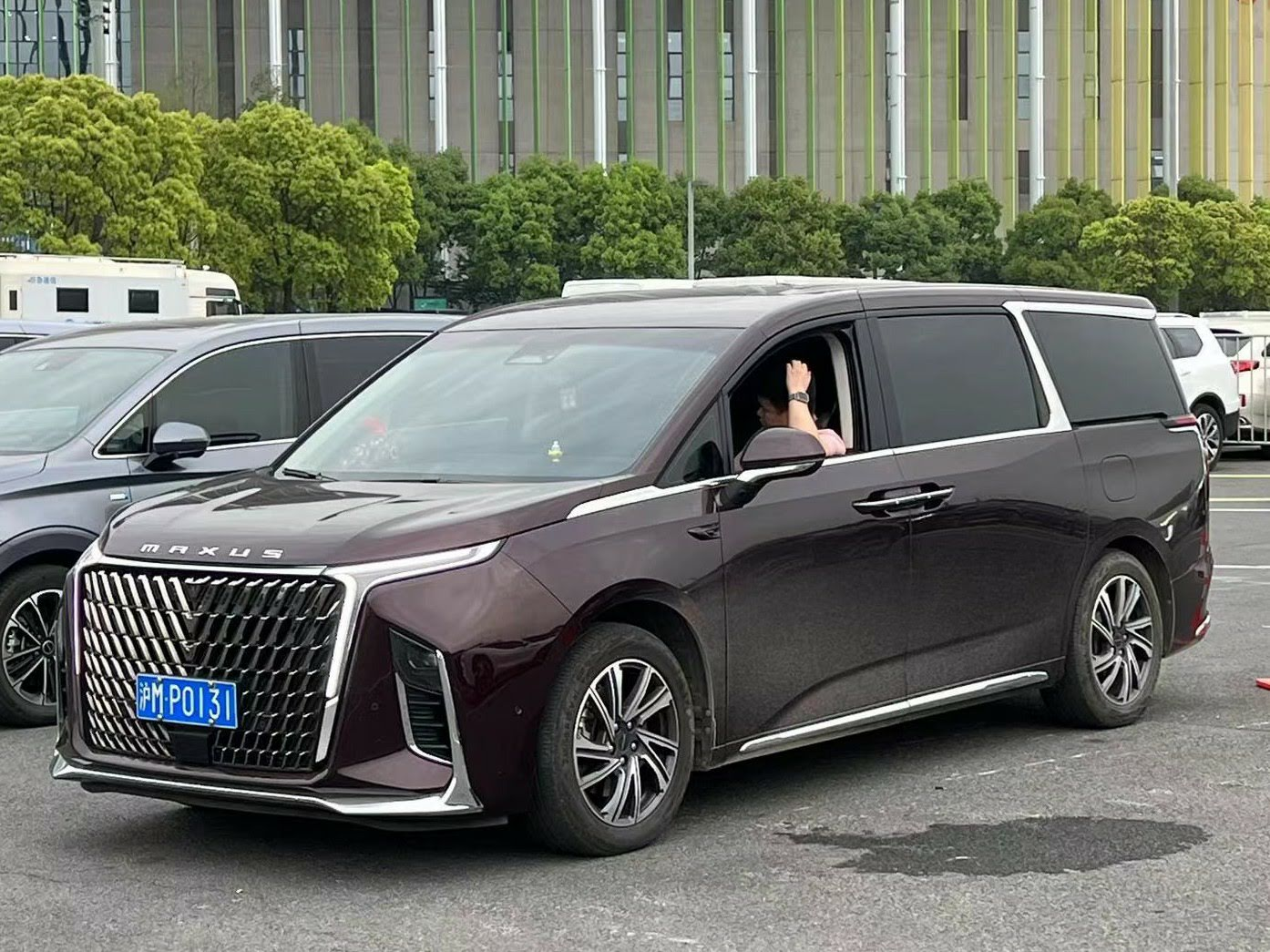
Maxus G90 (2022–present)

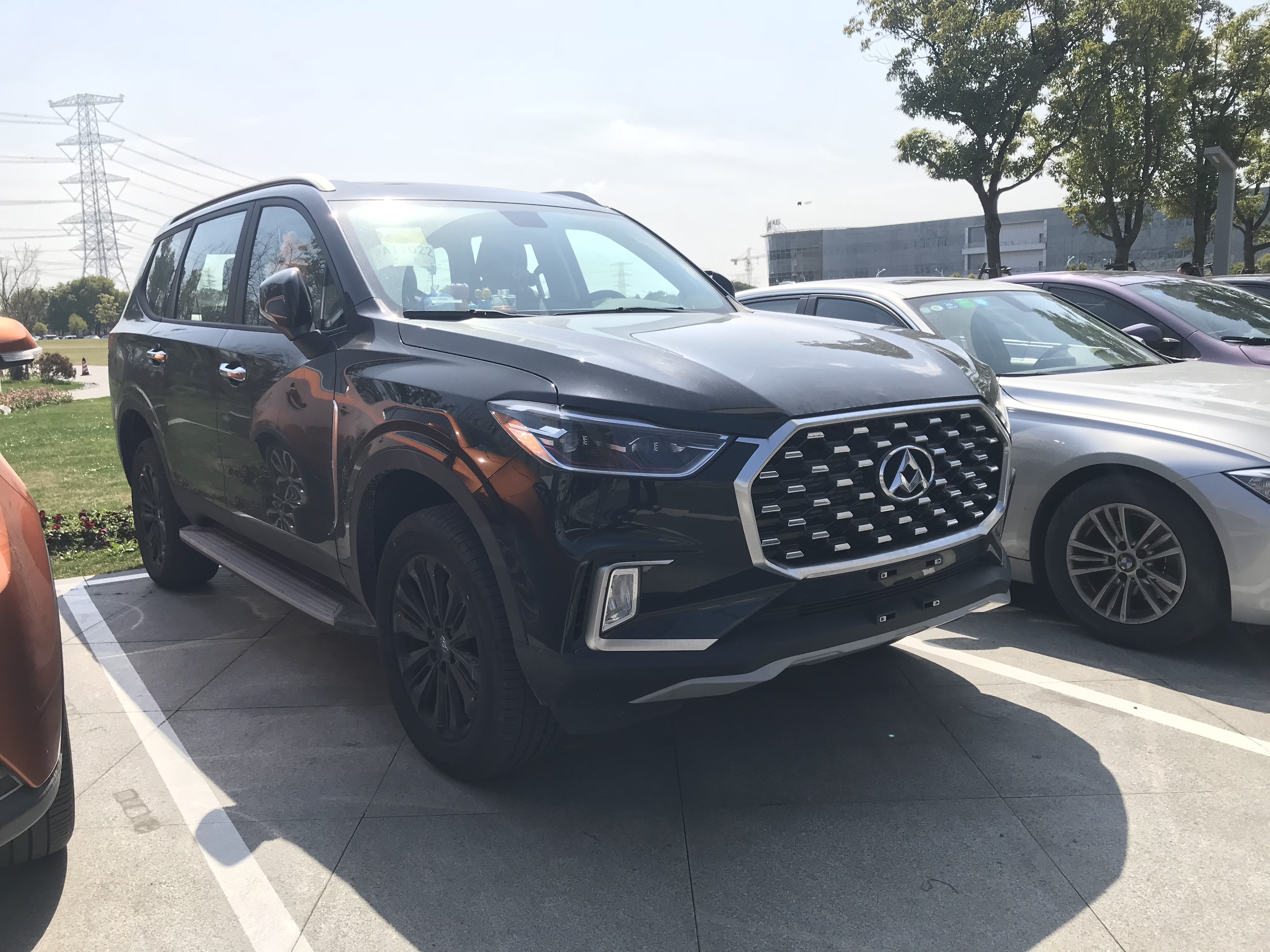
Maxus D90 (2017–2023)

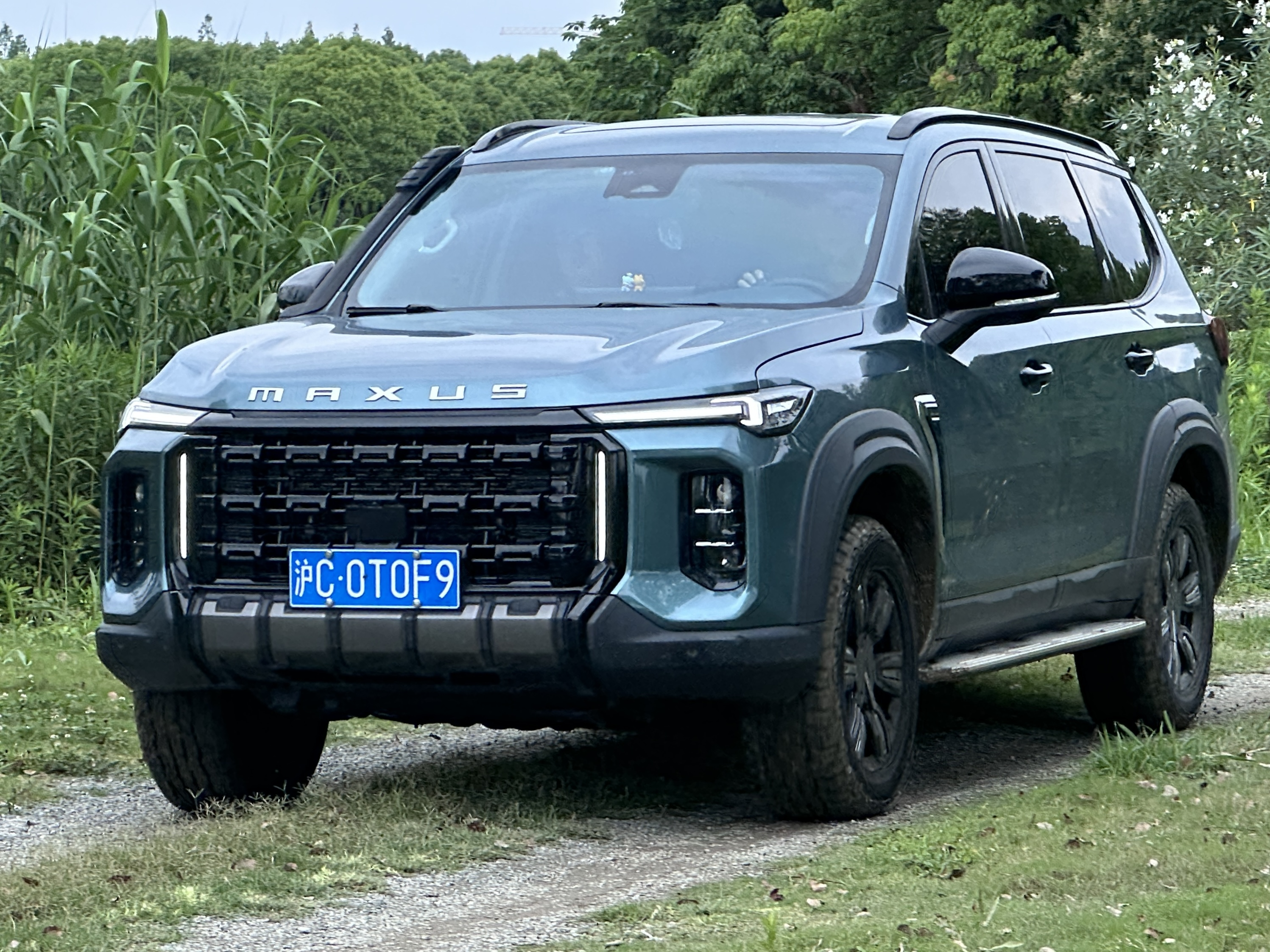
Maxus Territory (2022–present)

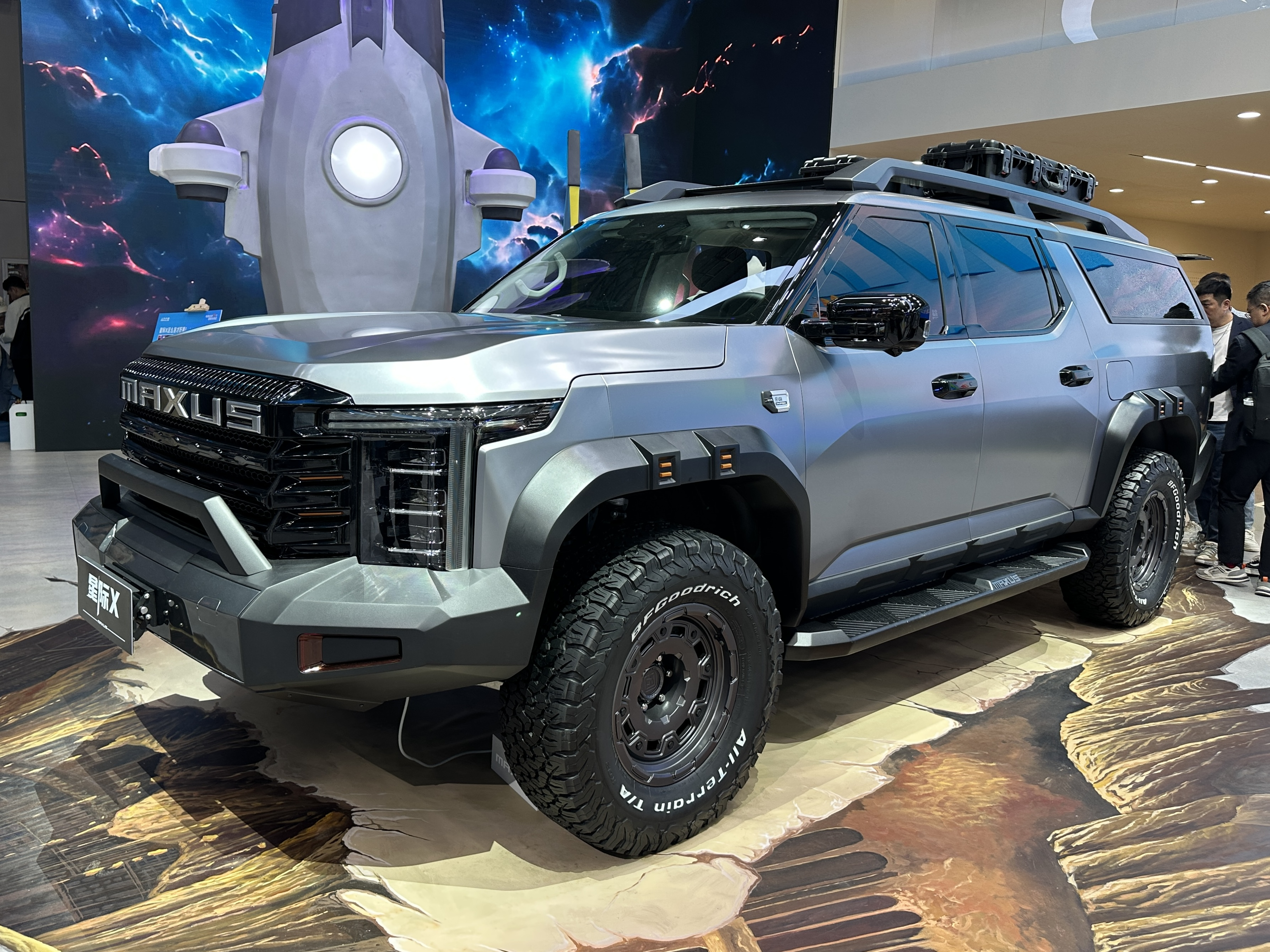
Maxus Interstellar X (2024–present)

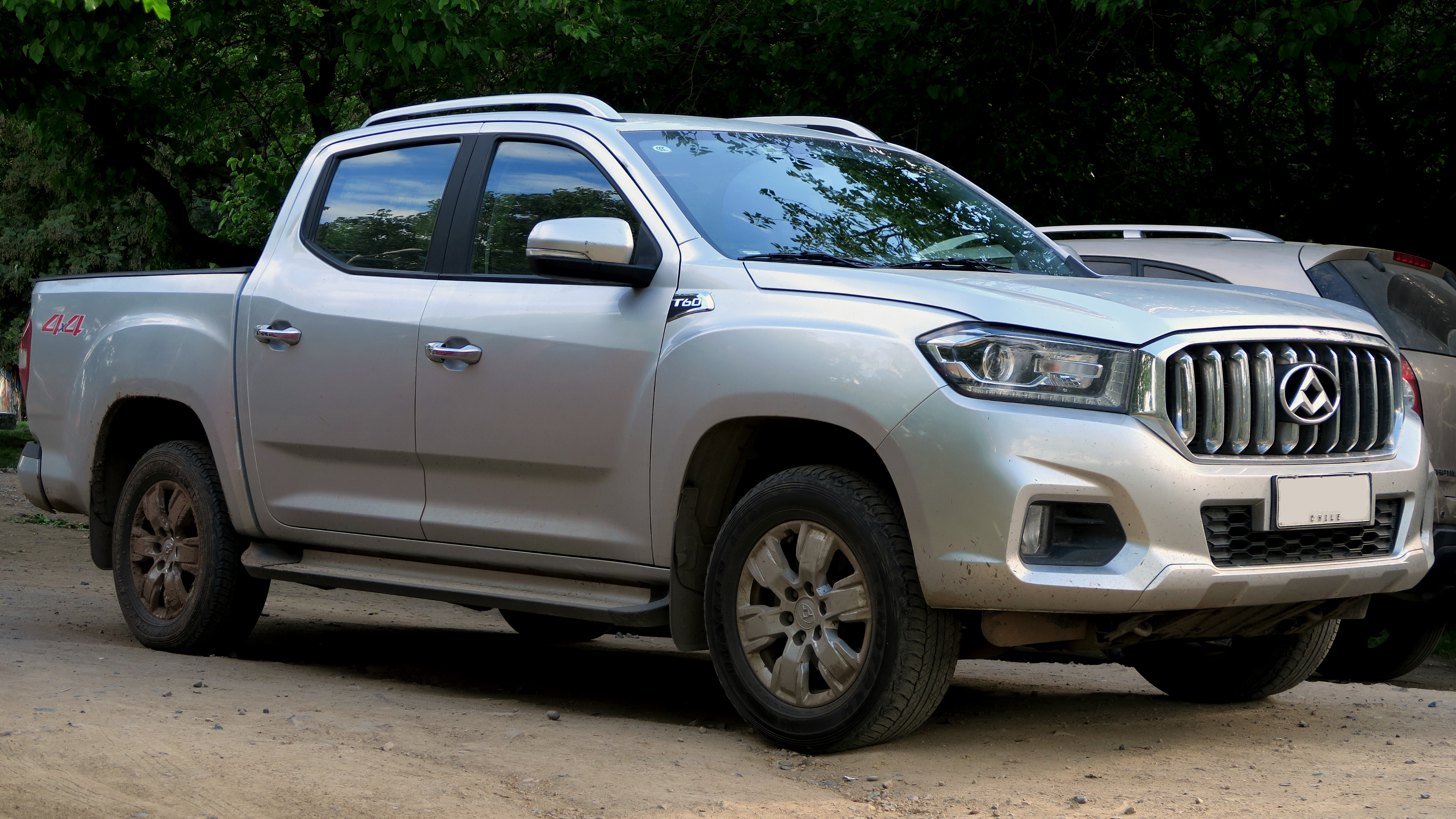
Maxus T60 (2016–present)

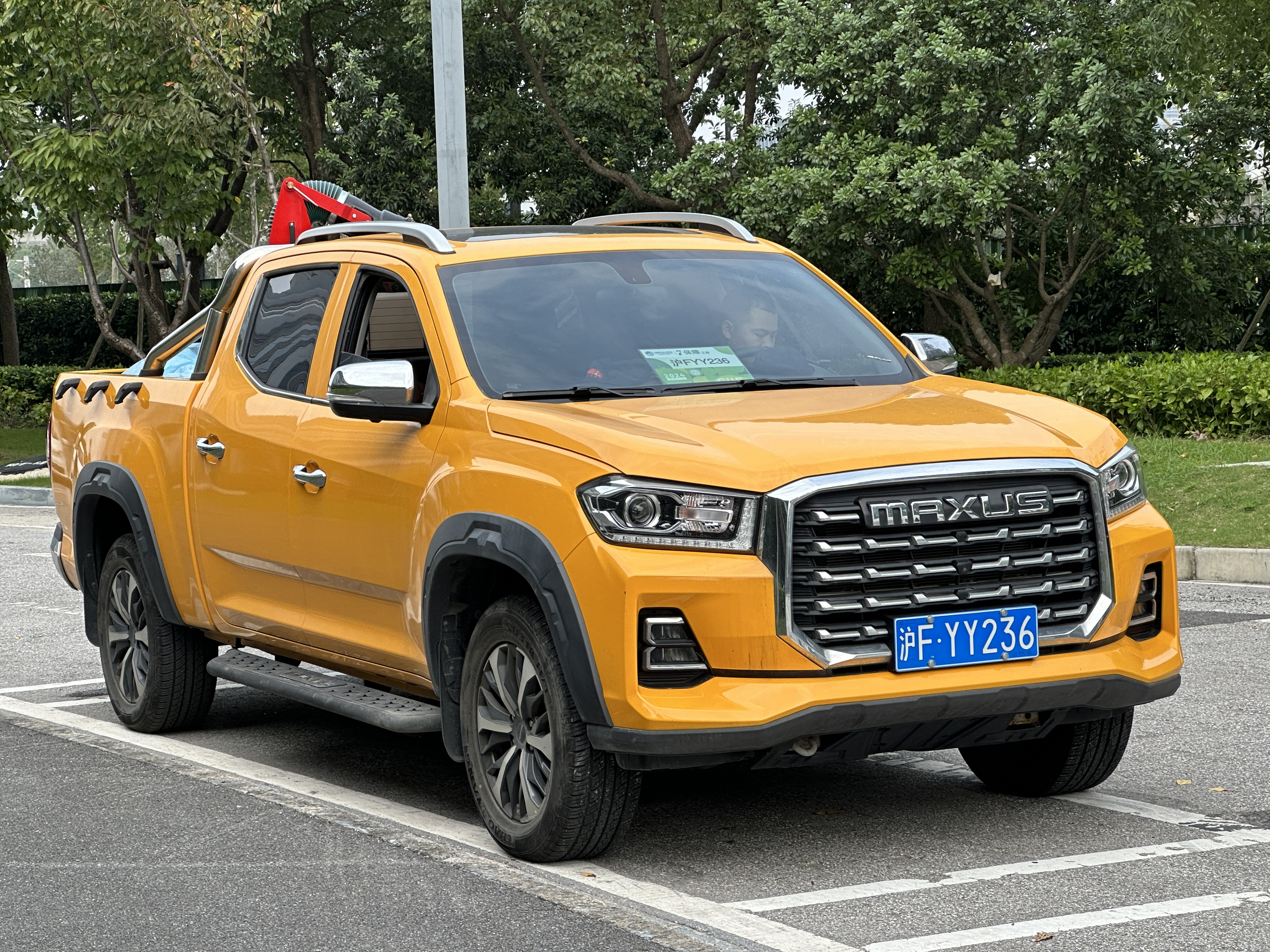
Maxus T70 (2019–present)

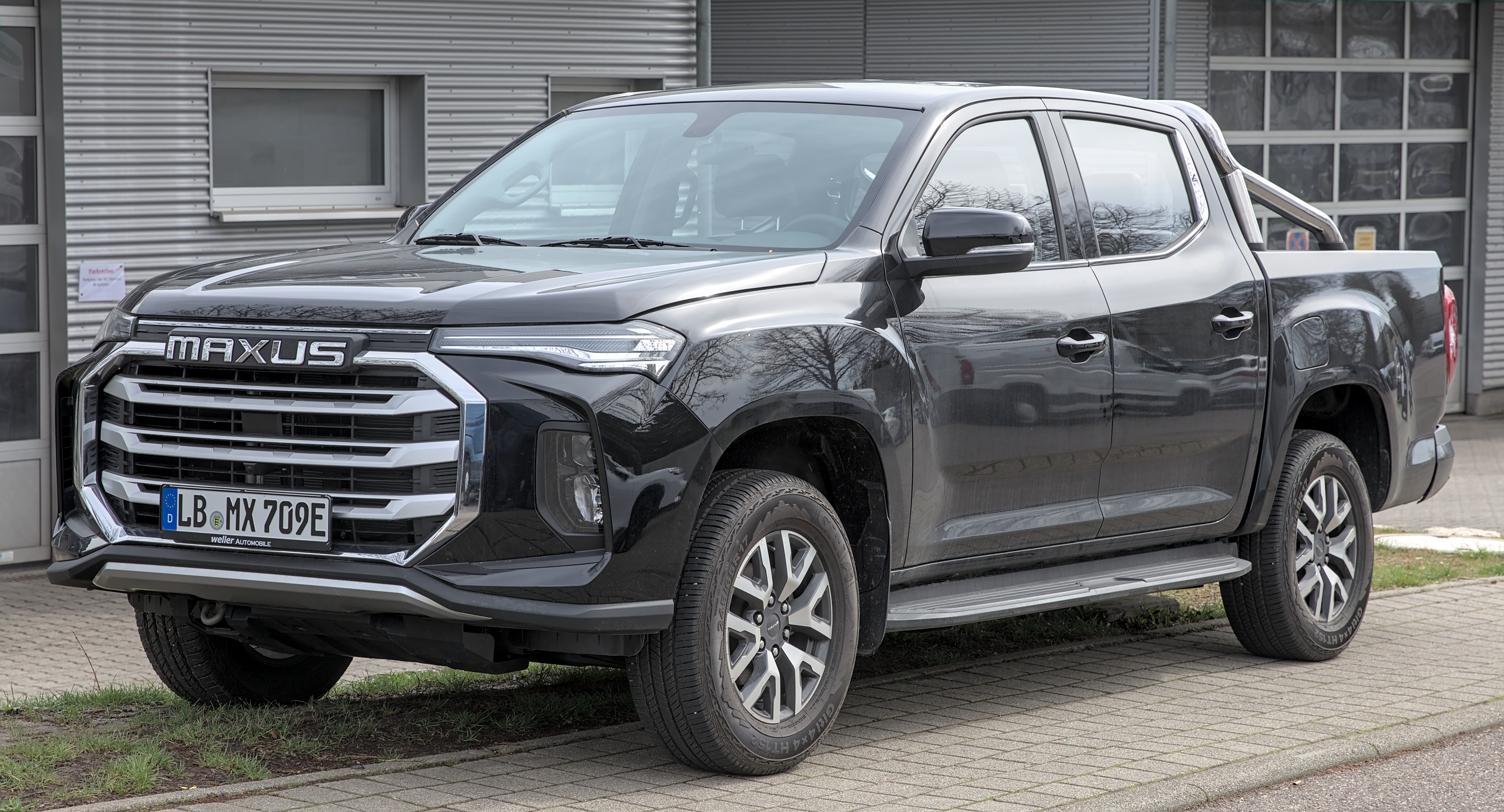
Maxus T90 (2021–present)

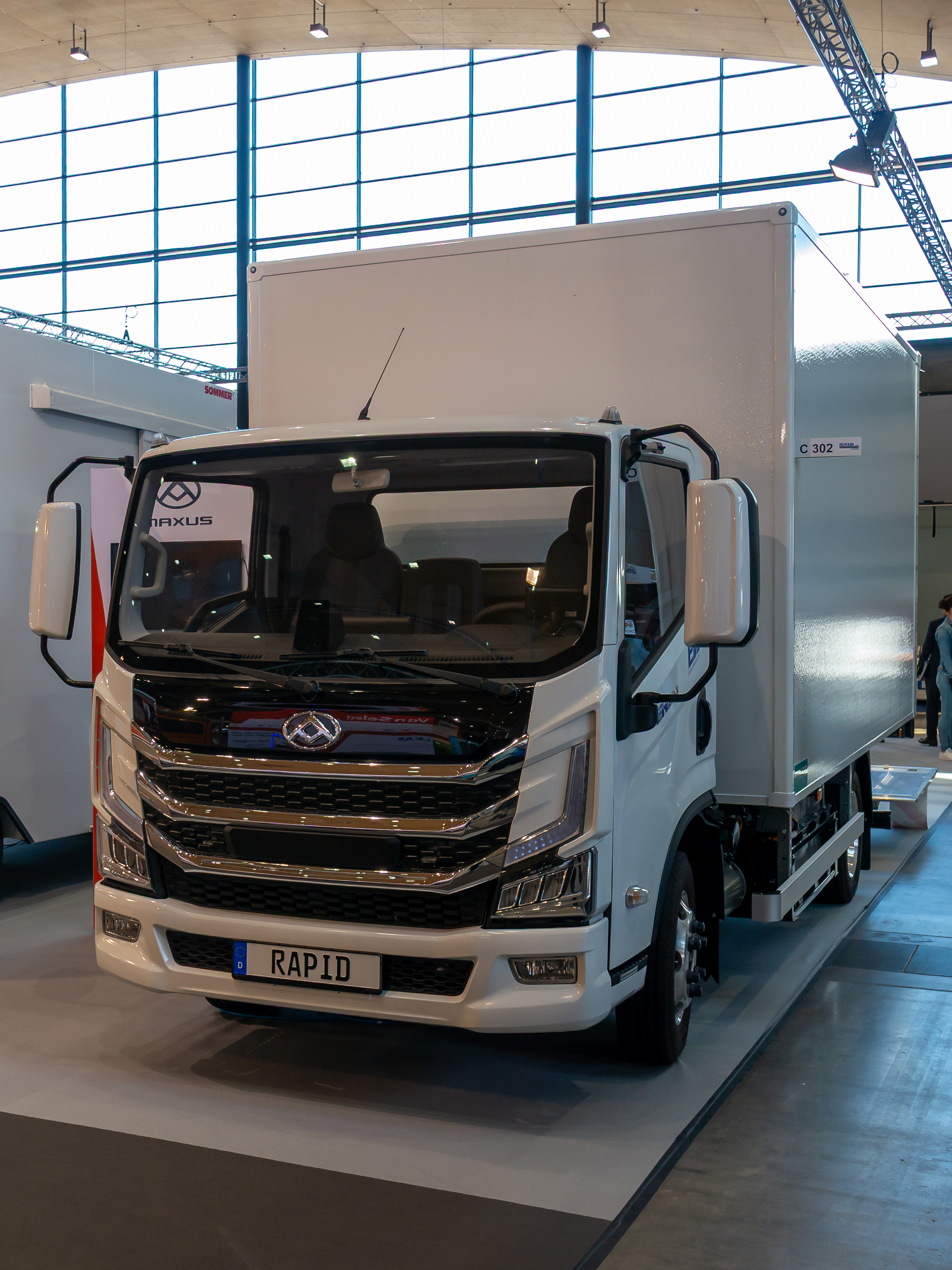
Maxus EH300

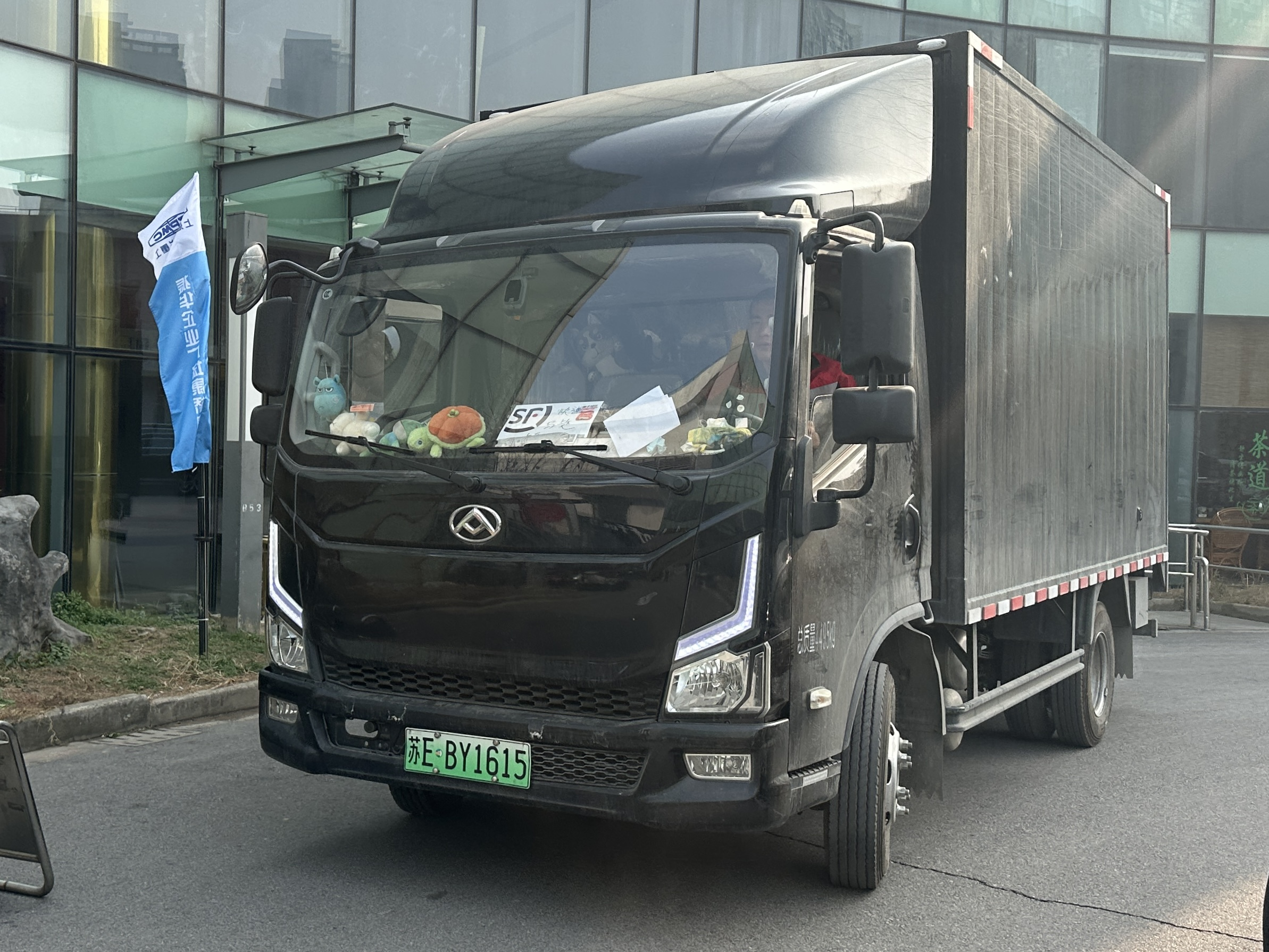
Maxus Dana T1

=== Former ===
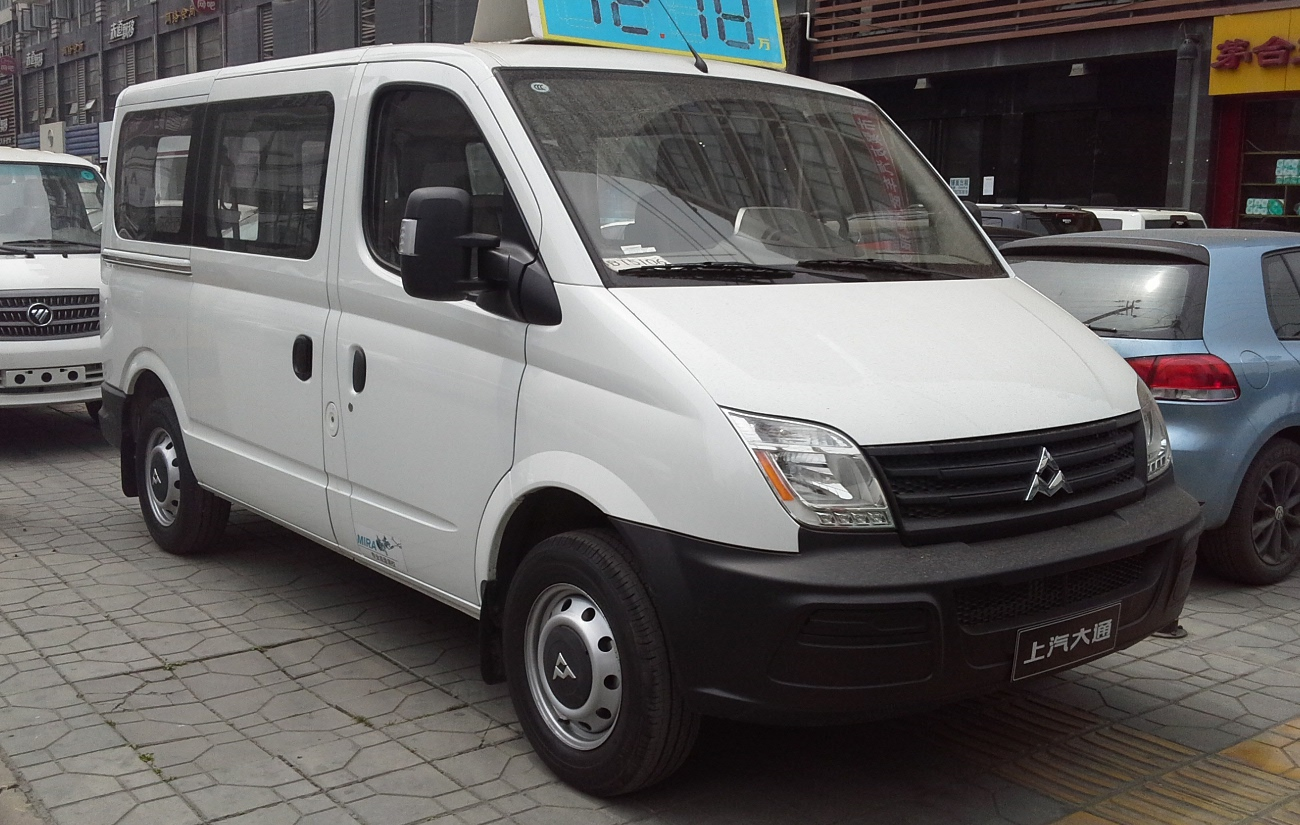
Maxus LD100 (2005–2009; under license)
Maxus V80 (2009–2011)

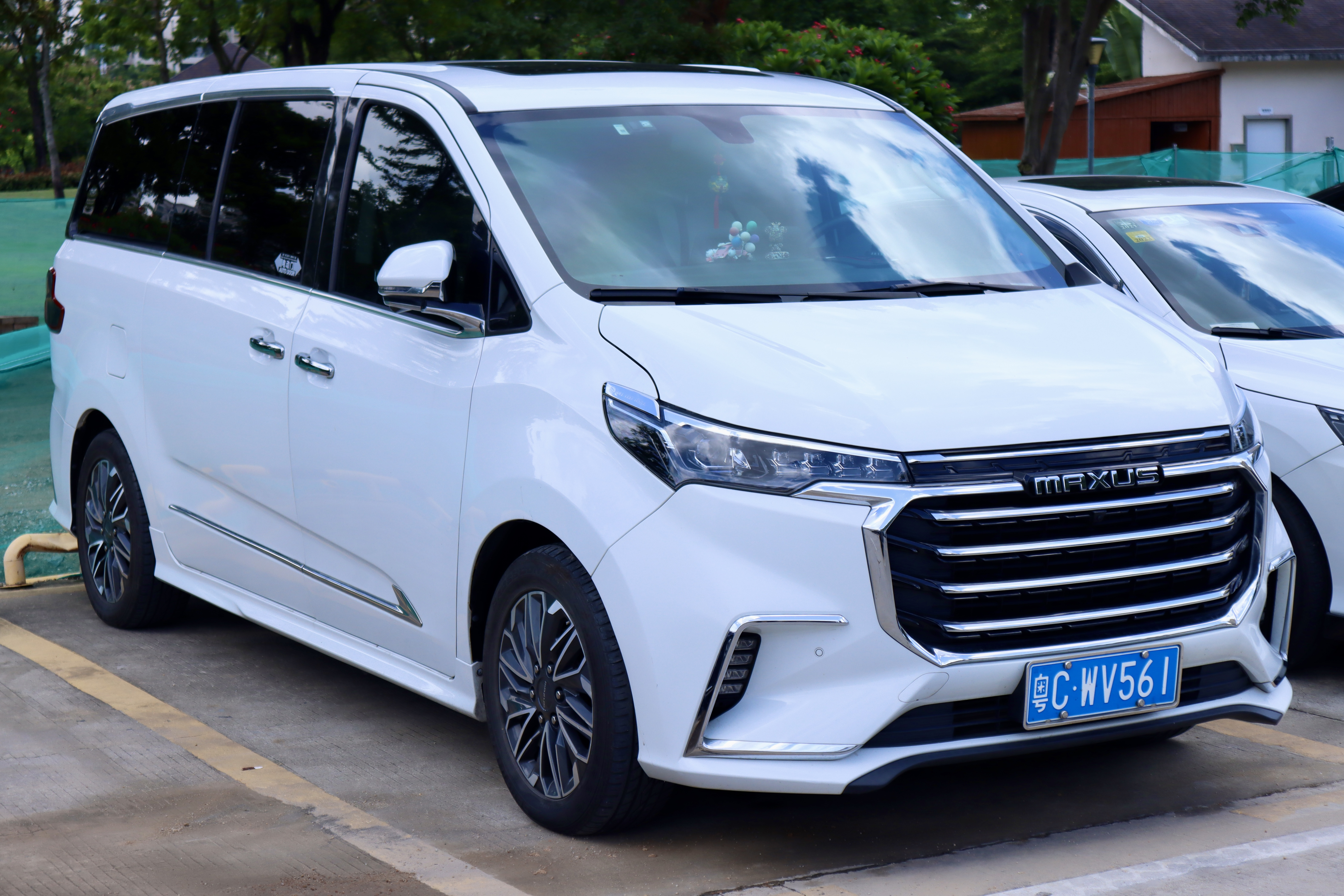
Maxus G20 (2019–2025)

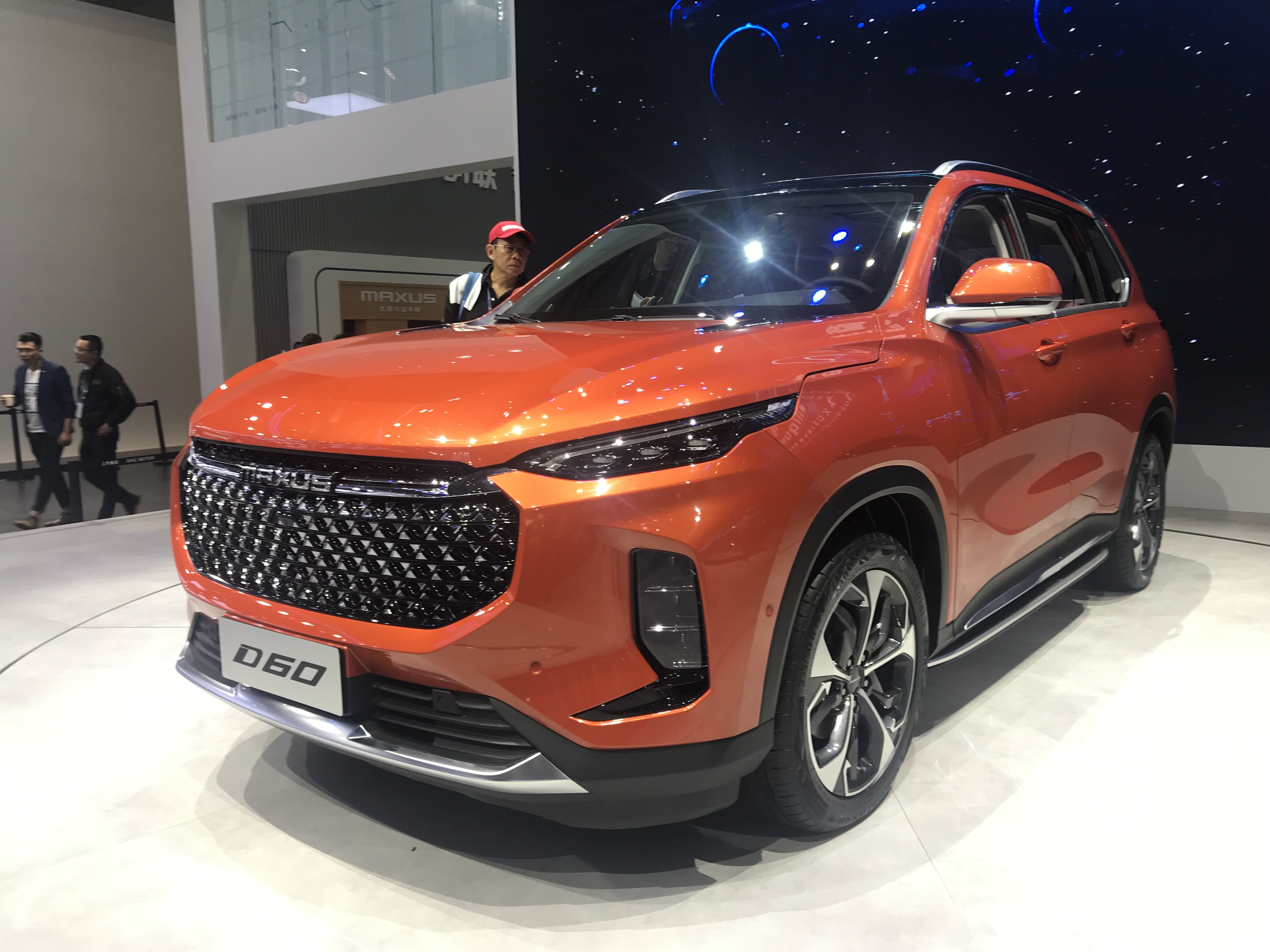
Maxus D60 (2019–2024)

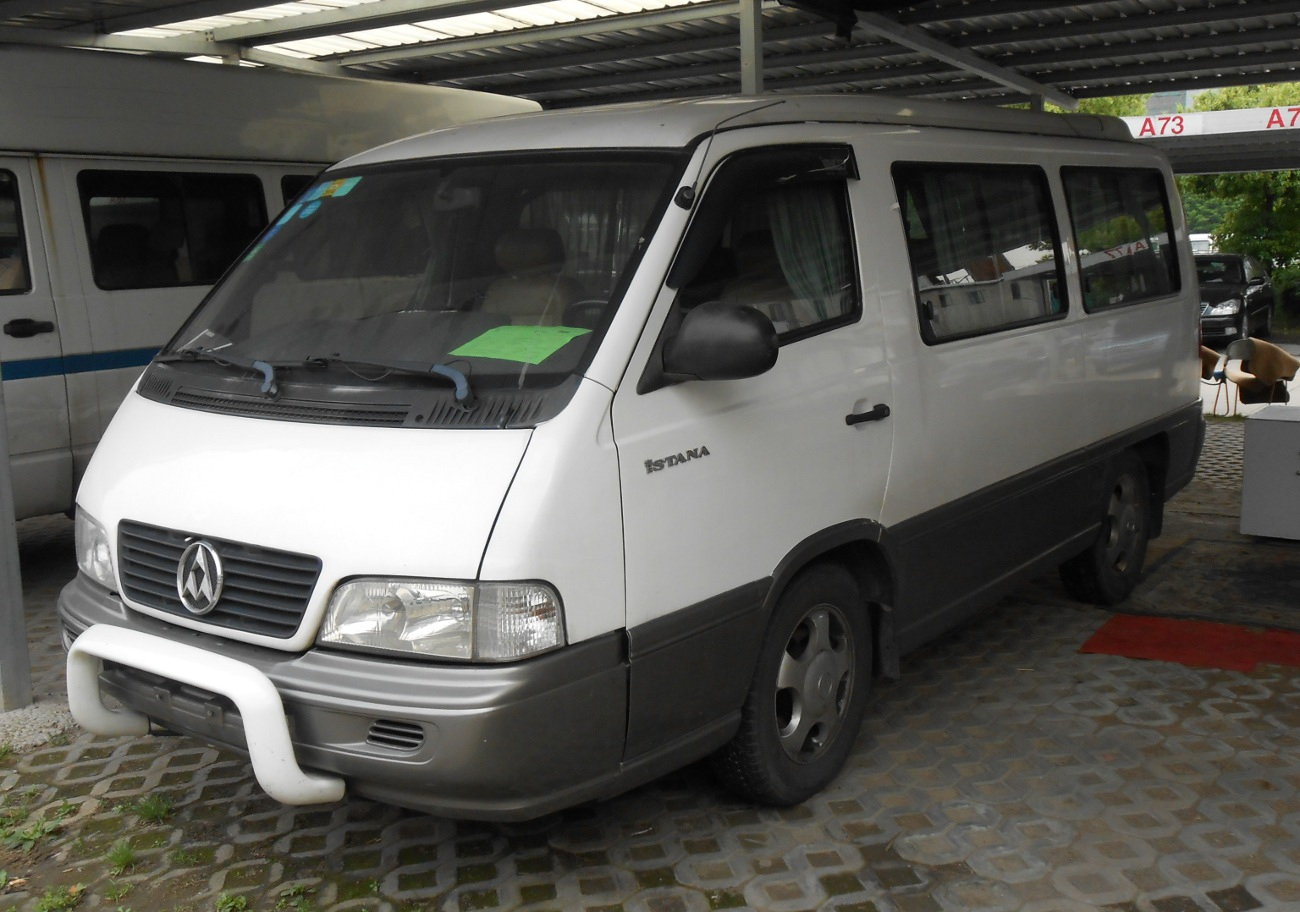
Maxus Istana (2009–2014)

== See also ==
- Automobile manufacturers and brands of China
- List of automobile manufacturers of China
