= Maxus Dana V1 =

Chinese van

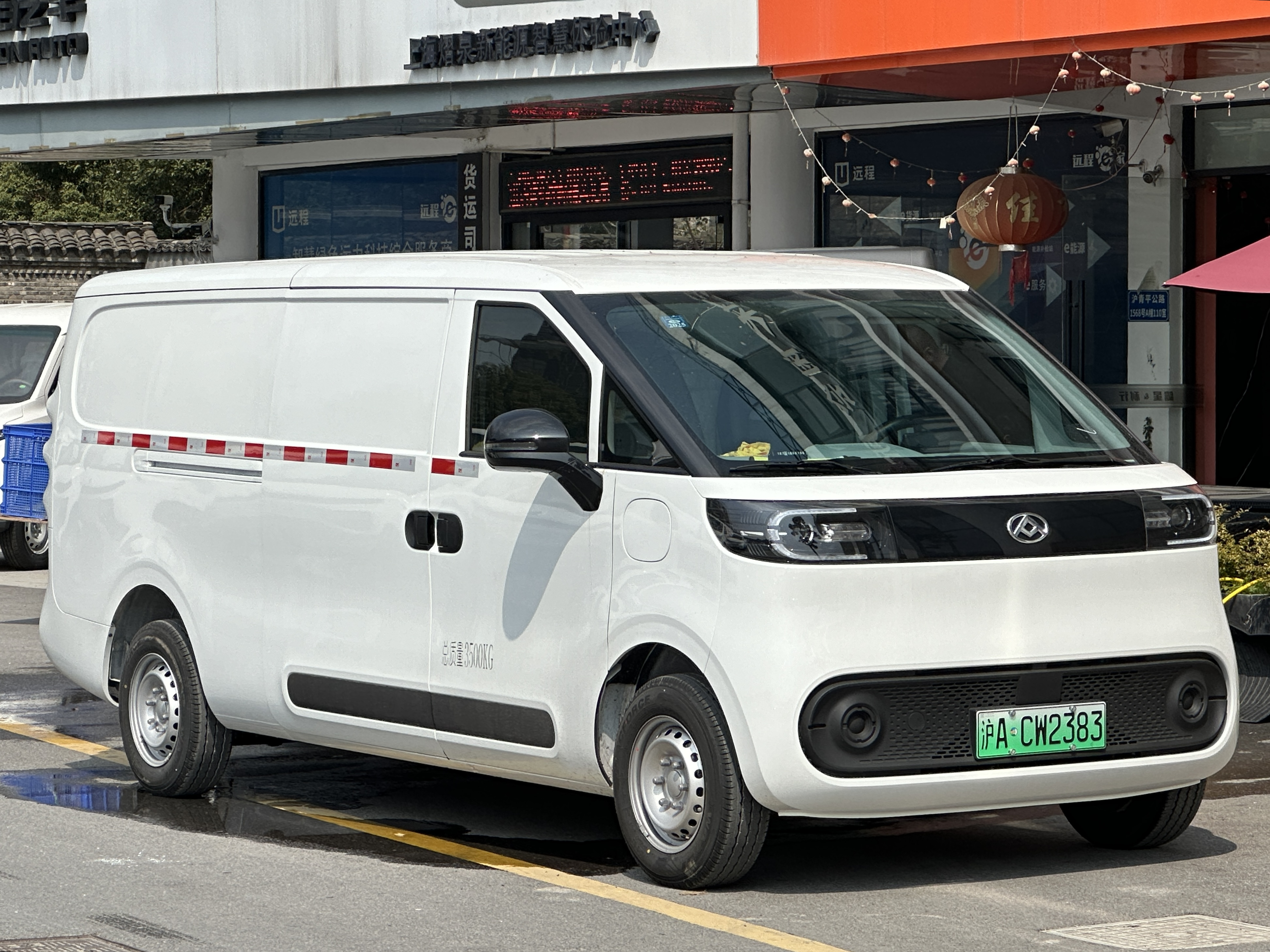
- Maxus Dana V1

Overview
- Manufacturer: Maxus (SAIC Motor)
- Also called: Maxus Dana V1L (LWB); Maxus Dana M1 (passenger version); Maxus Dana T1 (truck version); Maxus eDeliver 5 (export); LDV eDeliver 5 (Australia)
- Production: 2024–present
- Assembly: China: Wuxi

Body and chassis
- Class: Light commercial vehicle
- Body style: 4-door van; 4-door minibus
- Layout: Battery electric: Front-engine, front-wheel-drive; Rear-engine, rear-wheel-drive (T1); Range-extended EV: Front-engine Front-motor, front-wheel-drive (V1L EREV)
- Platform: MILA platform

Powertrain
- Engine: 1.0 L (42 kW 57 PS) Xingpai inline-2 (generator)
- Electric motor: TZ180XSSQC permanent magnet synchronous electric motor
- Power output: 70 kW (94 hp; 95 PS); 90 kW (121 hp; 122 PS); 120 kW (161 hp; 163 PS)
- Transmission: 1-speed direct-drive
- Hybrid drivetrain: Series hybrid (EREV)
- Battery: Li-ion battery (LFP): 42 kWh; 43 kWh; 50 kWh CATL Tianxing; 51 kWh; 64 kWh
- Electric range: 260 km; 270 km; 290 km; 305 km; 320 km

Dimensions
- Wheelbase: SWB: 3,100 mm (122.0 in); LWB: 3,450 mm (135.8 in)
- Length: SWB: 4,800 mm (189.0 in); LWB: 5,250 mm (206.7 in)
- Width: 1,870 mm (73.6 in)
- Height: Standard: 1,960 mm (77.2 in); High roof: 2,180 mm (85.8 in)
- Curb weight: 3,050 kg (6,724 lb)

The Maxus Dana V1 (Chinese: 大拿V1; lit. 'professional and/or leader V1 (north-east china slang)') is a battery electric and range extended van designed and produced by the Chinese automaker Maxus since 2023. The V1 rides on the MILA platform with the platform underpinning several models including the V1, V1L, M1, and T1. The V1 is a logistics minivan, V1L is high roof LWB version of V1, the M1 is a passenger minivan sharing the design with the V1, and the T1 is a light truck.

== Overview ==
The V1 was launched on the Chinese car market in January 2024 as a mid-size electric distribution van of the Maxus brand.

== Specifications ==
The V1 is a standard 2-seater panel van and is equipped with a front-drive motor with an output of 90 kW with the power coming from a 42 kWh lithium-phosphate-iron battery. The powertrain consumes 15.9 kWh and supports a 305 km CLTC range.

As a purpose-built electric van design, the V1 has a carrying capacity of 1.4 tons and a towing capacity of 2.5 tons with a floor height of 520mm. The rear suspension construction is a leaf spring structure, and it is equipped with 15-inch wheels as standard with an approach angle of 26° and a departure angle of 22°. In selected markets, the Dana V1 would be offered in both short and long-wheelbase Dana V1L variants and standard or high roof configurations.

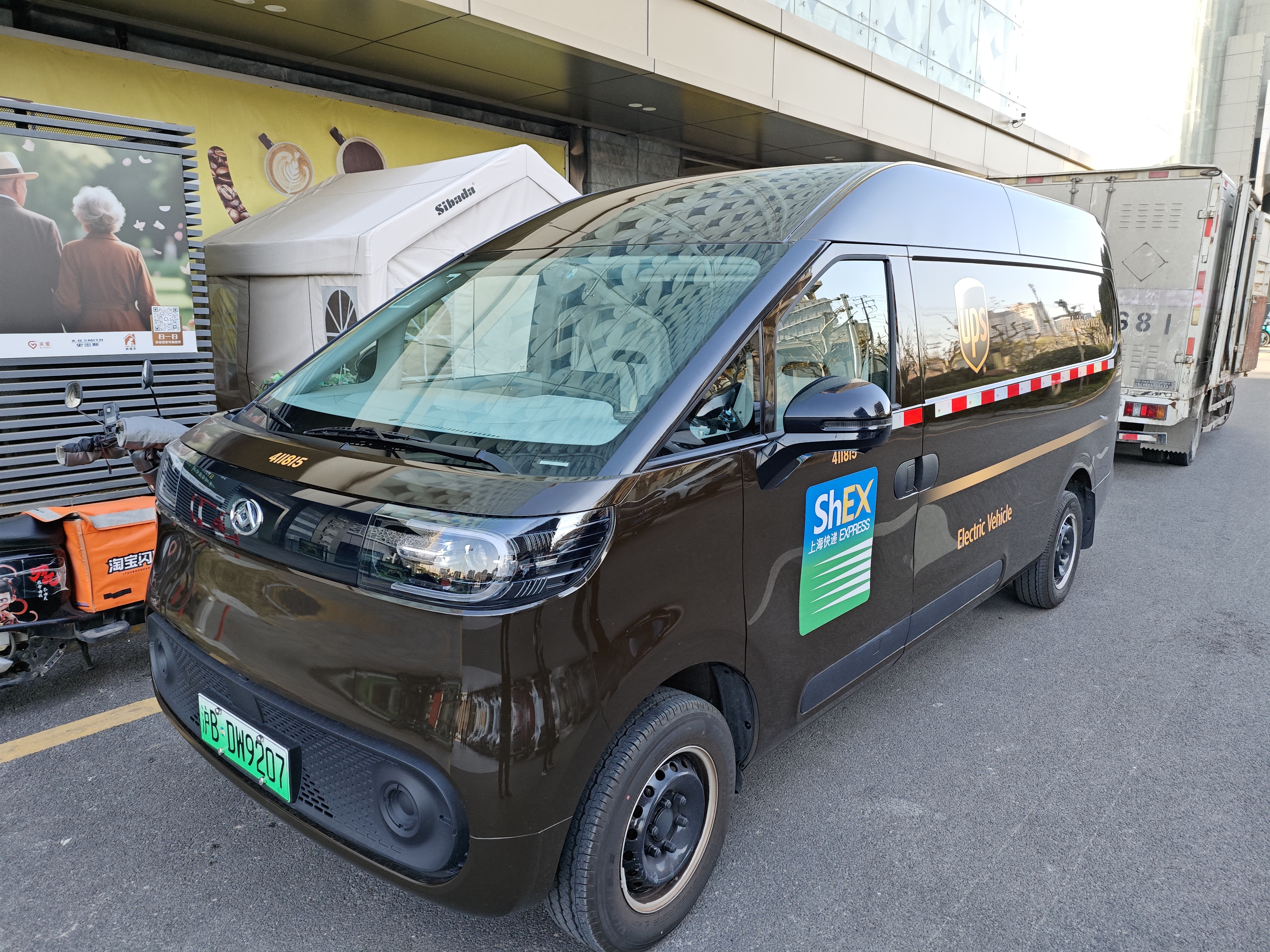
Maxus Dana V1L (EV)

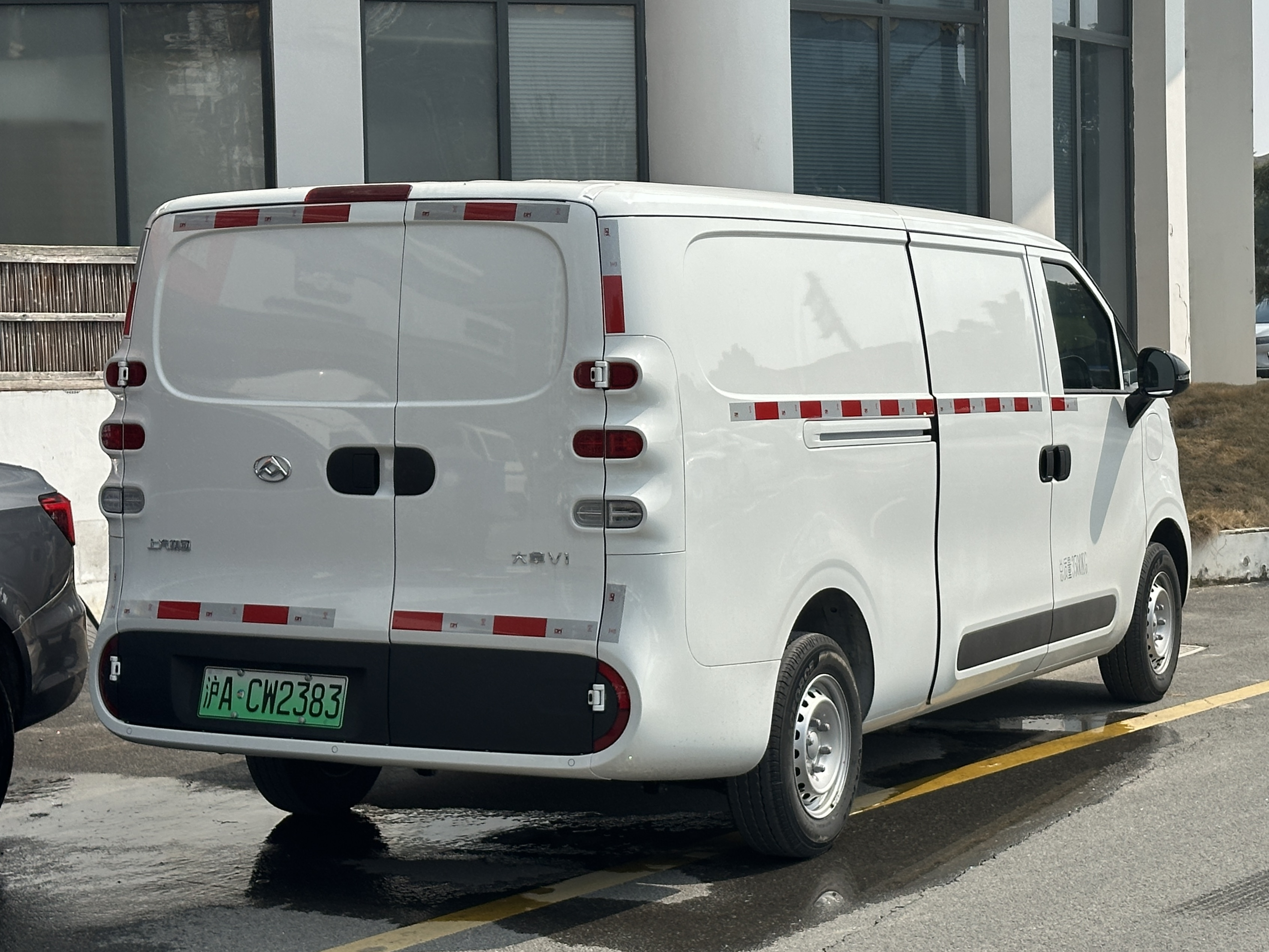
Rear view

== Maxus Dana M1 ==
launched alongside the V1, the passenger variant called the M1 provides 5 seats (2+3), 6 seats (3+3), and various seating layouts such as 9 (3+3+3) seats.

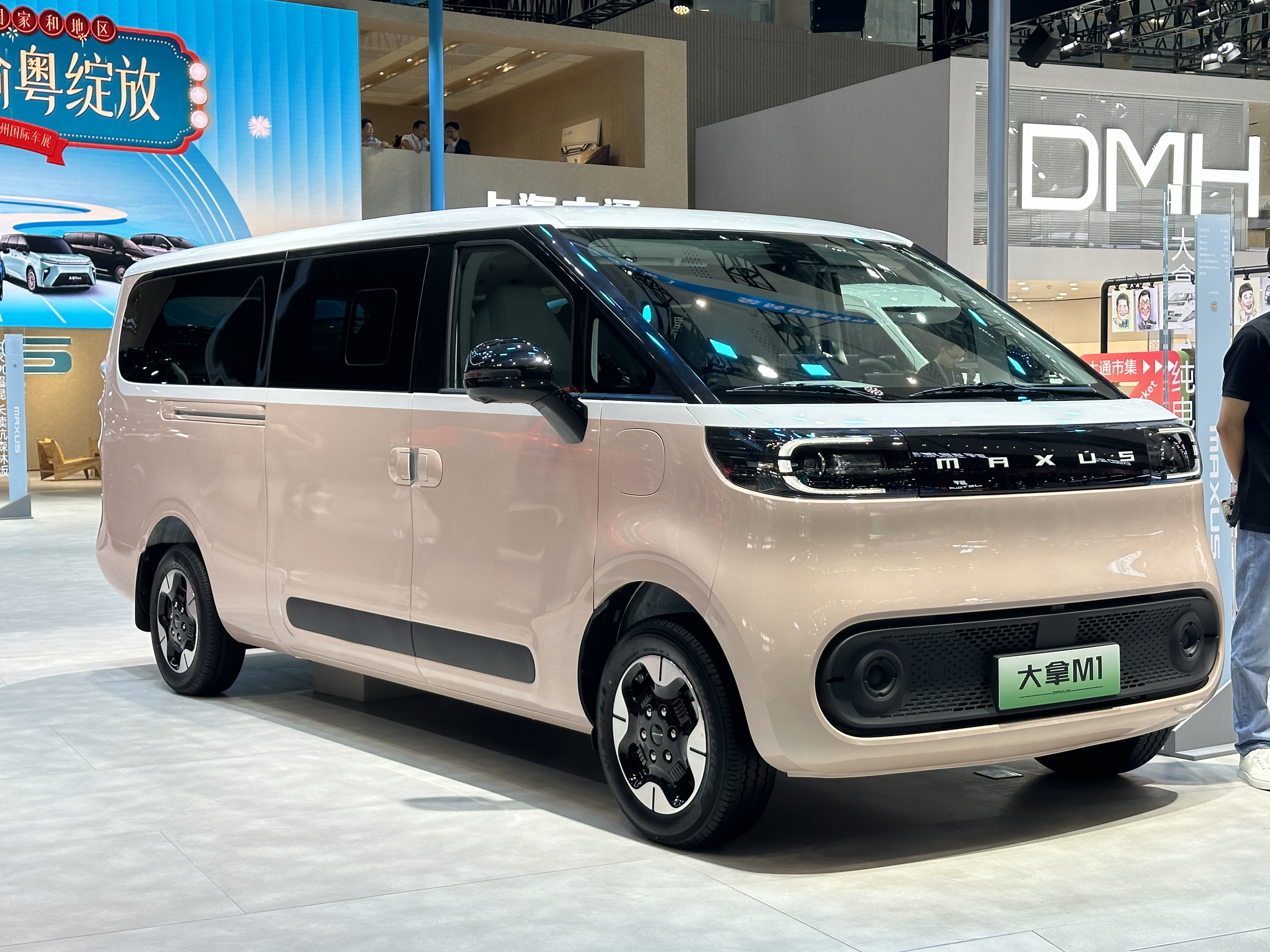
Maxus Dana M1

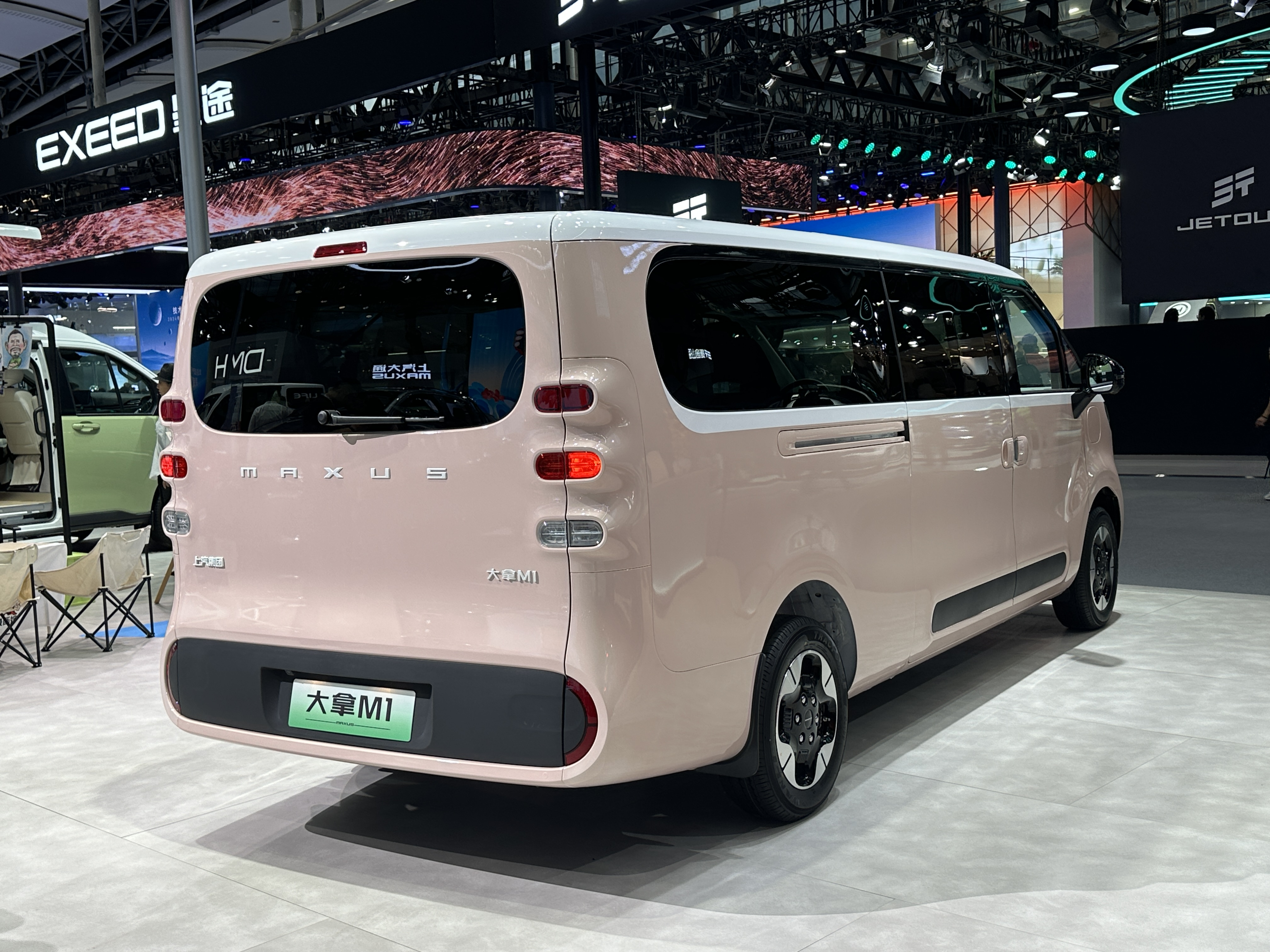
Rear view

== Range extended variant ==
The Dana Range extended variant was launched during the 2026 Beijing Auto Show. The Dana REEV is equipped with the Xingpai (星湃) 1.0 liter inline-2 42 kW range extender with the whole system weighing under 70kg. The fuel consumption is 2.65 liters per 100 km. The electric motor produces 90kW and 200N·m and the CATL supplied 50kW Tianxing batteries supports a CLTC pure electric range of 312km with the energy consumption of 17.6kW per 100.km. V2L power outlet is also built-in.

Maxus Dana V1L (REEV, panel van)

Maxus Dana V1L (REEV, passenger van)

== Safety ==
Euro NCAP test results Maxus eDeliver 5 (2025)
Test	Score
Overall:	5 /5 stars
Safe driving	67%
Crash avoidance	77%
Post crash	80%
