= G70 =

G70 may refer to:

- GeForce 7 series, a graphics processing unit
- G70 Fuzhou–Yinchuan Expressway, a road in China
- HMAS Queenborough (G70), a ship
- Genesis G70, a car
- designation of 7th generation BMW 7 Series
- Maxus G70, a minivan
