= Maxus G90 =

Chinese minivan

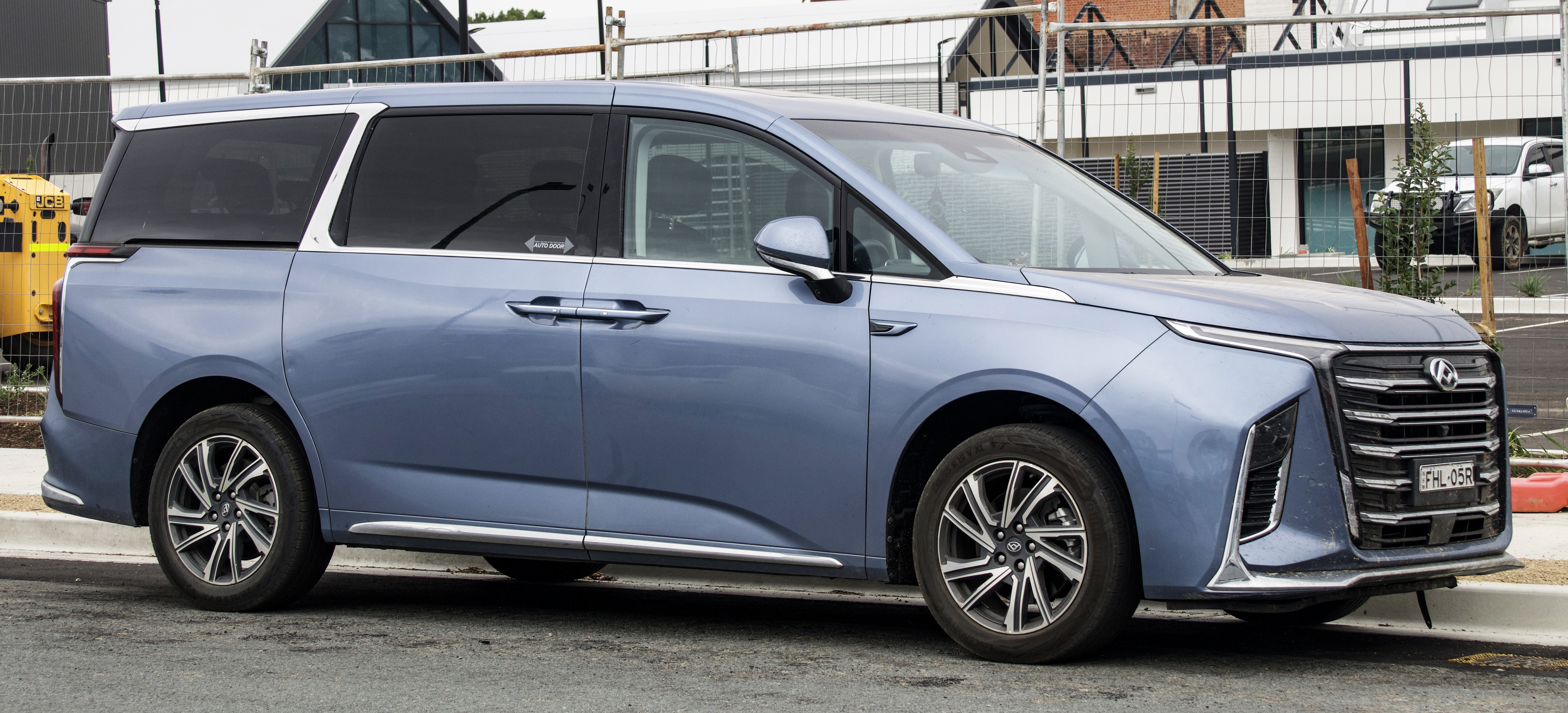

Overview
- Manufacturer: Maxus (SAIC Motor)
- Also called: LDV Mifa (Australia); Maxus Mifa (Brunei)
- Production: 2022–present
- Assembly: China: Wuxi

Body and chassis
- Class: Minivan
- Body style: 5-door minivan
- Layout: Front-engine, Front wheel drive

Powertrain
- Engine: 2.0 L 20A4E I4 turbo petrol
- Electric motor: Belt-Driven Starter Generator
- Transmission: 8-speed Aisin AW F8F Series automatic
- Hybrid drivetrain: MHEV

Dimensions
- Wheelbase: 3,198 mm (125.9 in)
- Length: 5,198 mm (204.6 in)
- Width: 1,980 mm (78.0 in)
- Height: 1,928 mm (75.9 in)
- Curb weight: 2,060–2,790 kg (4,542–6,151 lb)

Chronology
- Predecessor: Maxus G10

The Maxus G90 is a minivan manufactured by SAIC Motor and sold under its Maxus division, which launched on the Chinese car market in April 2022. The G90 is the gasoline-powered variant of the electric Maxus Mifa 9.

== Overview ==
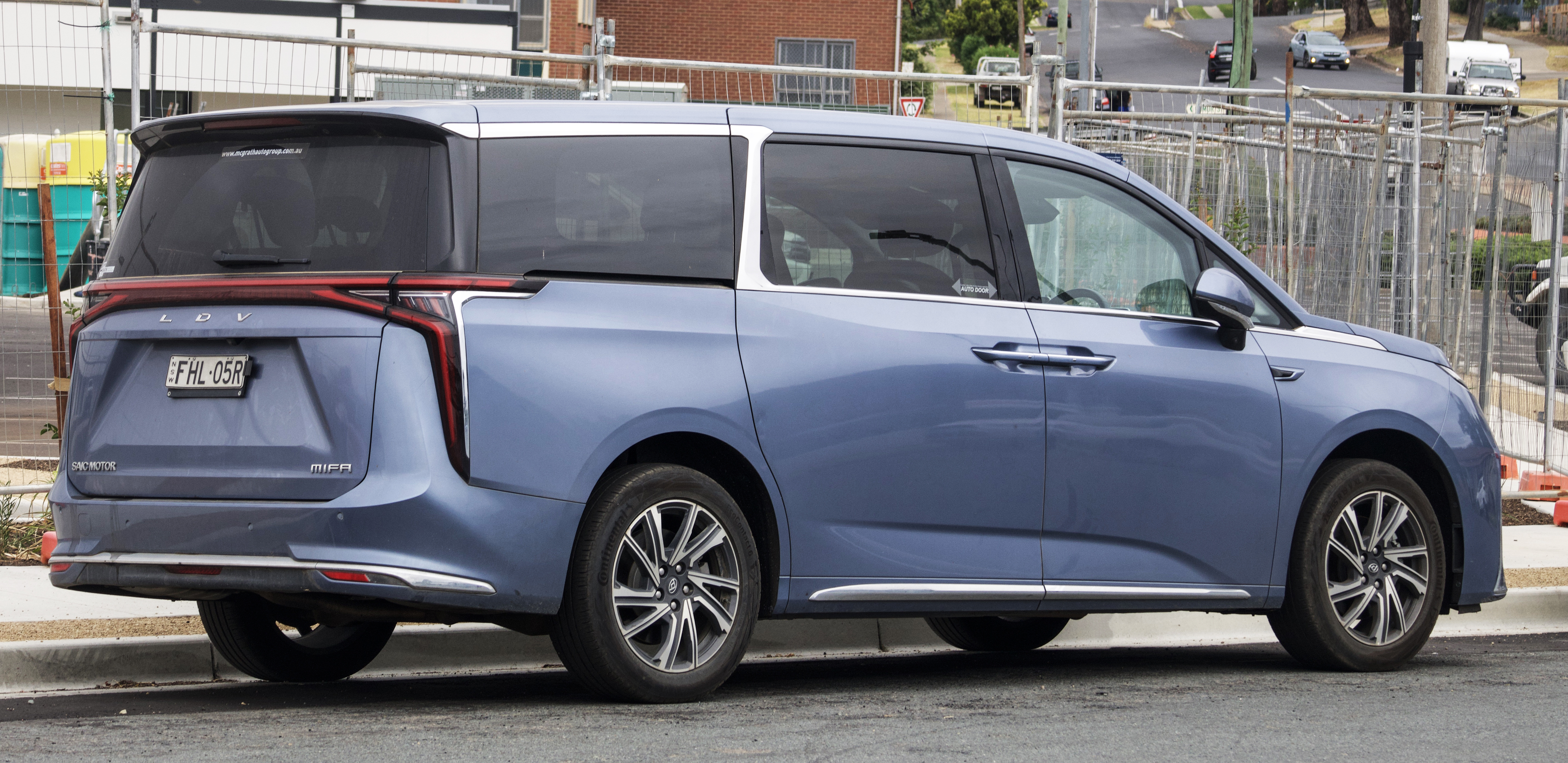
Rear view

The interior features a 10 in (250 mm) heads-up display and a full-width digital unit with three screens across the dashboard. The multimedia system runs on Maxus’ Spider Wisdom 2.0 system and the audio system being JBL’s flagship.

The G90 comes equipped with a 2.0-litre turbocharged petrol engine plus a 48 V mild hybrid system with 170 kW (230 hp) mated to an Aisin 8-speed automatic gearbox.

== Markets ==
=== Australia ===
In Australia, it is marketed as the LDV Mifa and was launched on 15 November 2022. It was available with three trim levels: Mode, Executive and Luxe.

=== Brunei ===
In Brunei, it is marketed as the Maxus Mifa and debuted on 24 May 2024. It was available with two trim levels: Premium and Luxury, it is powered by either 2.0-litre turbocharged petrol or 2.0-litre turbodiesel engine options.

== Maxus Mifa 9 ==
Maxus Mifa 9
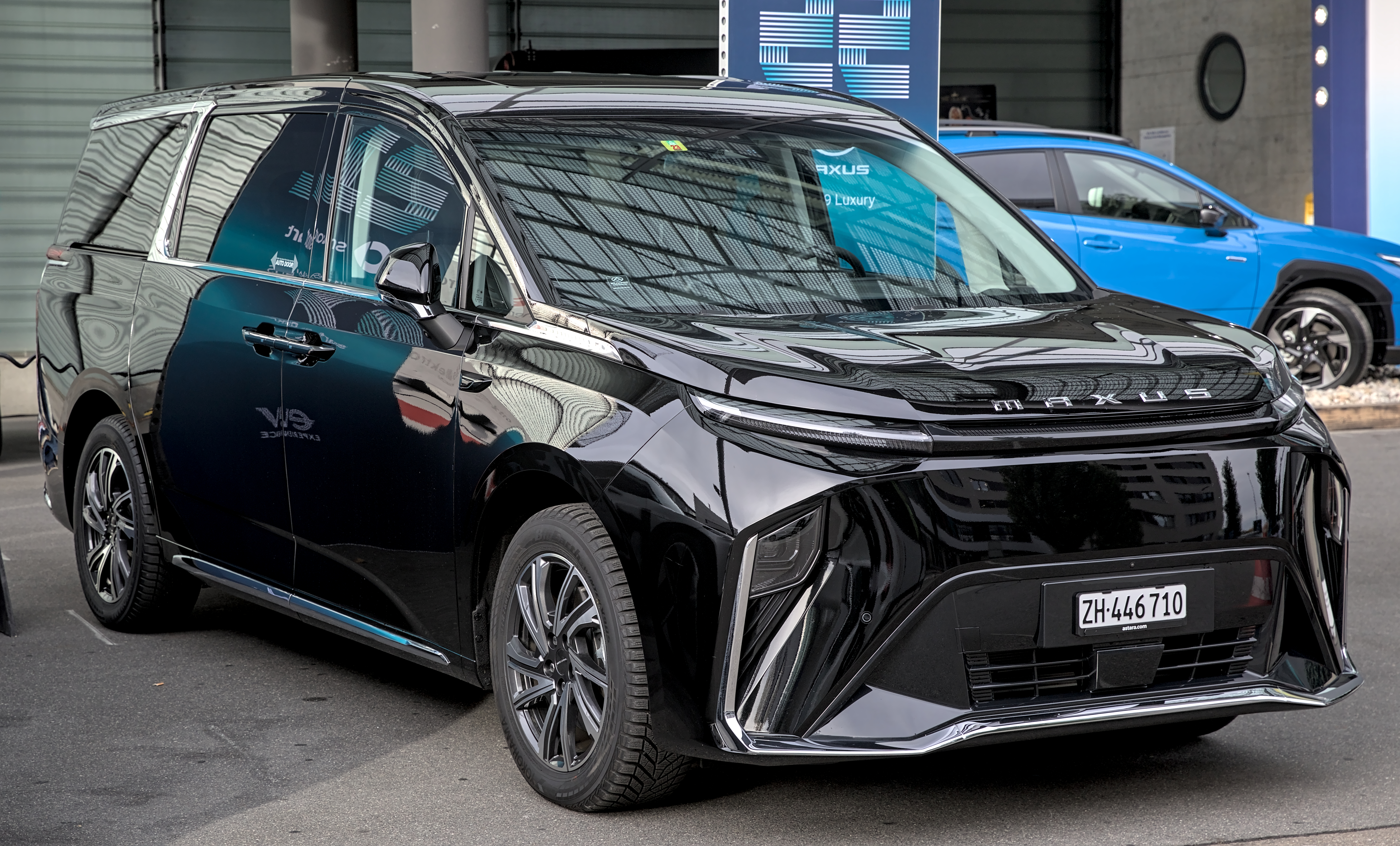

Overview
- Manufacturer: Maxus (SAIC Motor)
- Also called: LDV Mifa 9 (Australia); MG Maxus 9 (Thailand); MG M9 EV (India); MG Mifa 9 (Philippines)
- Production: 2021–present
- Assembly: China: Wuxi; Indonesia: Purwakarta (National Assemblers)

Body and chassis
- Class: Minivan
- Body style: 5-door minivan
- Layout: Front-motor, Front wheel drive

Powertrain
- Electric motor: Permanent magnet synchronous motor
- Power output: 180 kW (244.7 PS; 241.4 bhp)
- Transmission: 8-speed Aisin AWF8F automatic
- Battery: 90 kWh Ternary Li-ion
- Range: 323 miles (519.8 km)

Dimensions
- Wheelbase: 3,200 mm (126.0 in)
- Length: 5,270 mm (207.5 in); 5,280 mm (207.9 in)
- Width: 2,000 mm (78.7 in); 1,998 mm (78.7 in)
- Height: 1,840 mm (72.4 in)
- Curb weight: 2,310–2,535 kg (5,093–5,589 lb)

The Maxus Mifa 9 is a battery electric and plug-in hybrid minivan manufactured by SAIC Motor and sold under its Maxus division, which launched on the Chinese car market in November 2021. The Mifa 9 is based on the same platform as the later announced gasoline powered Maxus G90.

=== Overview ===
The Mifa 9 was previewed by the Maxus Mifa concept presented at the Auto Shanghai in April 2021, showing the concept of a large, luxurious van with all-electric drive. The production model called Maxus Mifa 9 made its official debut in November 2021 at Auto Guangzhou, being the largest and most luxurious electric vehicle of the Maxus brand.

Visually, the Mifa 9 is distinguished by a massive, two-colour painted silhouette with a regular body shape with full LED lighting. The rear lamps were decorated with three-arm lamps, dominating the body in both width and length. The luxuriously arranged passenger cabin has space for 6 separate seats with a full range of adjustments.

Production and sales of Mifa 9 began subsequently after the November debut, in the mainland Chinese market. Moreover, Maxus also plan to start selling the vehicle on selected markets of Western Europe, including the United Kingdom.

== Specifications ==
The Mifa 9 is a battery electric minivan powered by a 183 kW; 248 PS (245 hp) and 350 NM electric motor. The CATL lithium-ion battery with a capacity of 90 kWh allow a range of around 520 km (320 mi). In 2023, a larger battery pack will allow a range of 650 km (400 mi).

=== Markets ===
==== Australia ====
In Australia, it is marketed as the LDV Mifa 9 and was launched on 22 November 2022. It was available with three trim levels: Mode, Executive, and Luxe.

==== Europe ====
The Maxus Mifa 9 was released in Europe in September 2022 at the IAA Transportation Show 2022, with deliveries commenced in early 2023.

==== India ====
In India, it is marketed as the MG M9 and went on sale on 21 July 2025 under the MG Select sub-brand, which also sells the MG Cyberster. Fully imported from China, it is available in the sole Presidential Pro variant.

==== Indonesia ====
The Maxus Mifa 9 was introduced in Indonesia in August 2023 at the 30th Gaikindo Indonesian International Auto Show, marking Maxus's entry to the Indonesian market, and was launched in Indonesia on 22 November 2024 at the 2024 Gaikindo Jakarta Auto Week alongside the Mifa 7. Initially imported from China, it is available in the sole variant. Local assembly commenced in Indonesia in June 2025 at the PT National Assemblers plant.

==== Malaysia ====
The Maxus Mifa 9 was launched on 8 November 2023 with two variants, Luxury and Premium. Both variants are fully imported from China.

==== Singapore ====
The Maxus Mifa 9 was launched on 10 July 2023 by distributor Cycle & Carriage Singapore, in the sole variant.

In Singapore, it is also marketed as the rebadged MG M9 EV and was launched on 14 January 2024 at the 2024 Singapore Motor Show. It is available with two variants: Trophy and Grand Trophy.

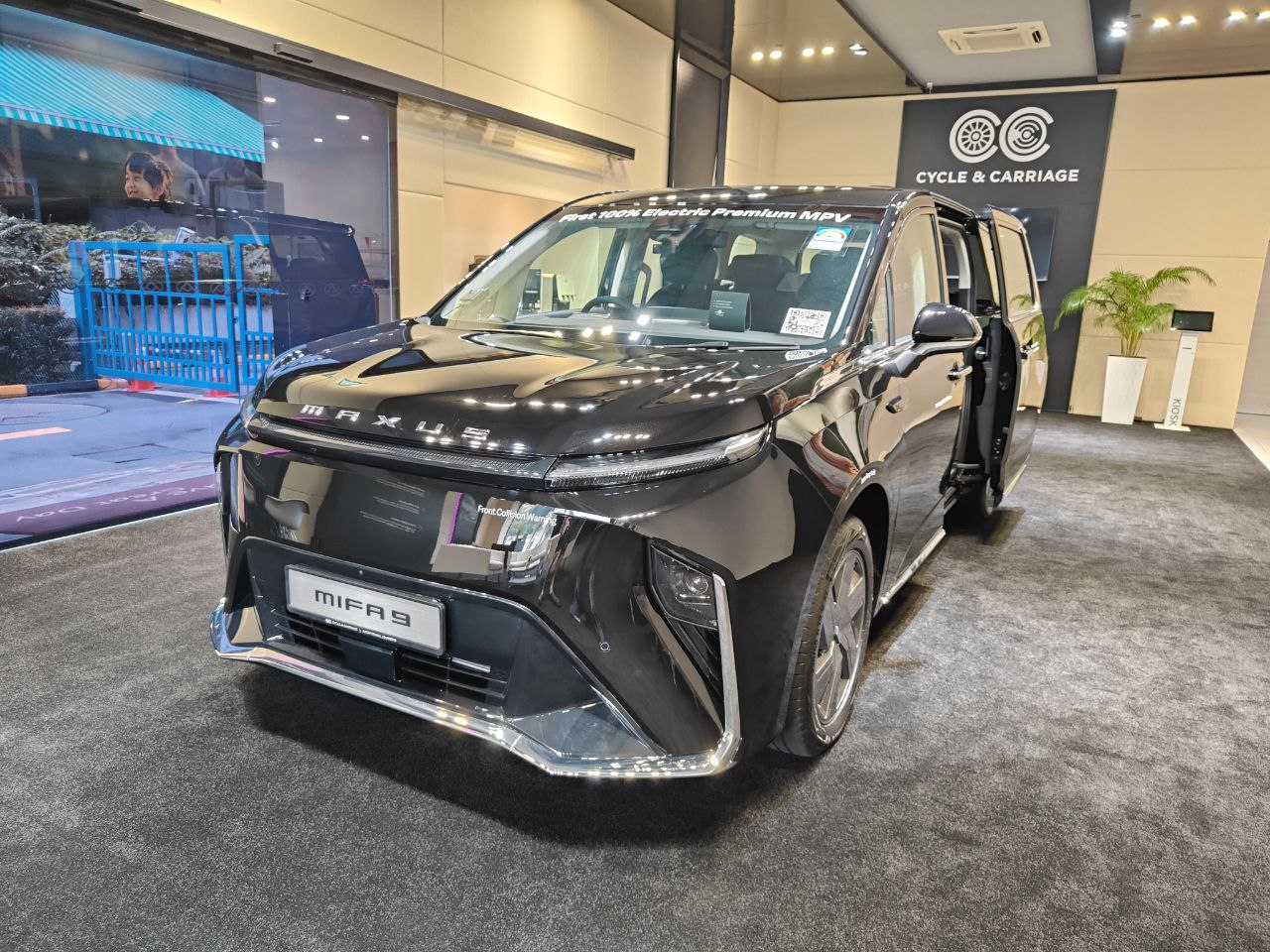
Maxus Mifa 9 (Singapore)

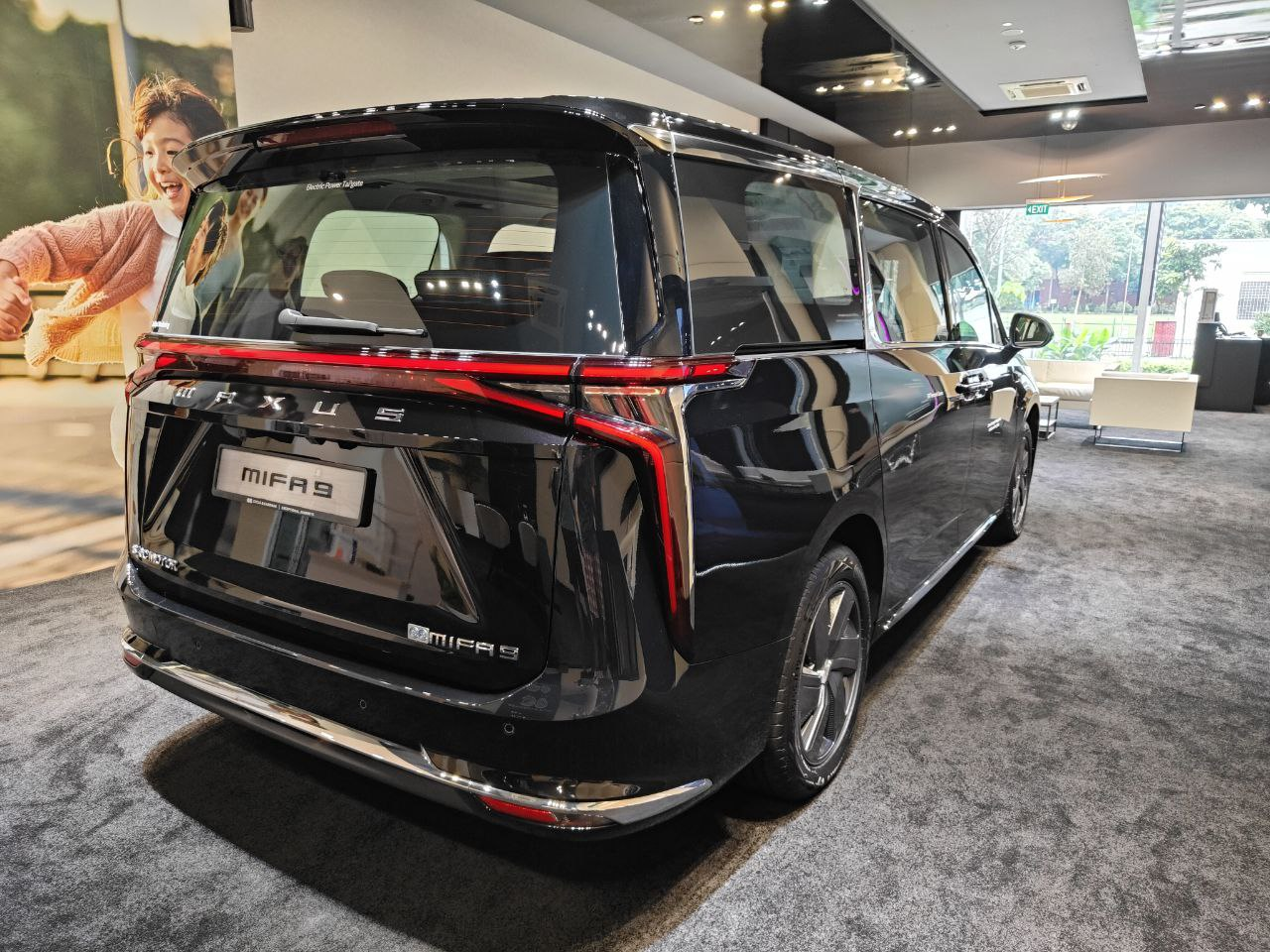
Maxus Mifa 9 (Singapore)

==== Thailand ====
In Thailand, it is marketed as the MG Maxus 9 and went on sale on 3 May 2023. Fully imported from China, it is available with two variants: X and V. The entry-level Plus variant was added in July 2025. The flagship V+ variant was added in March 2026.

=== Gallery ===
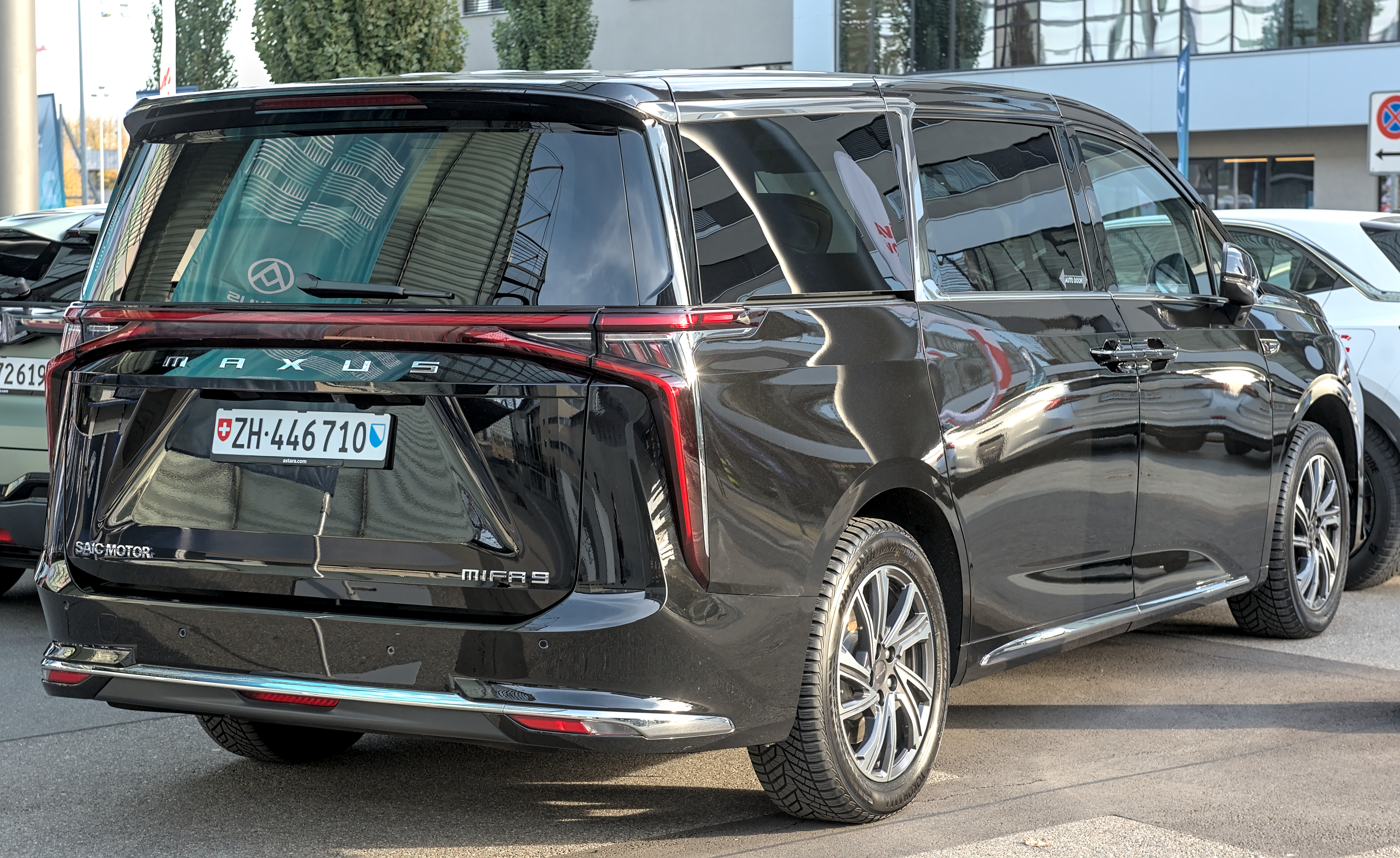
Rear view

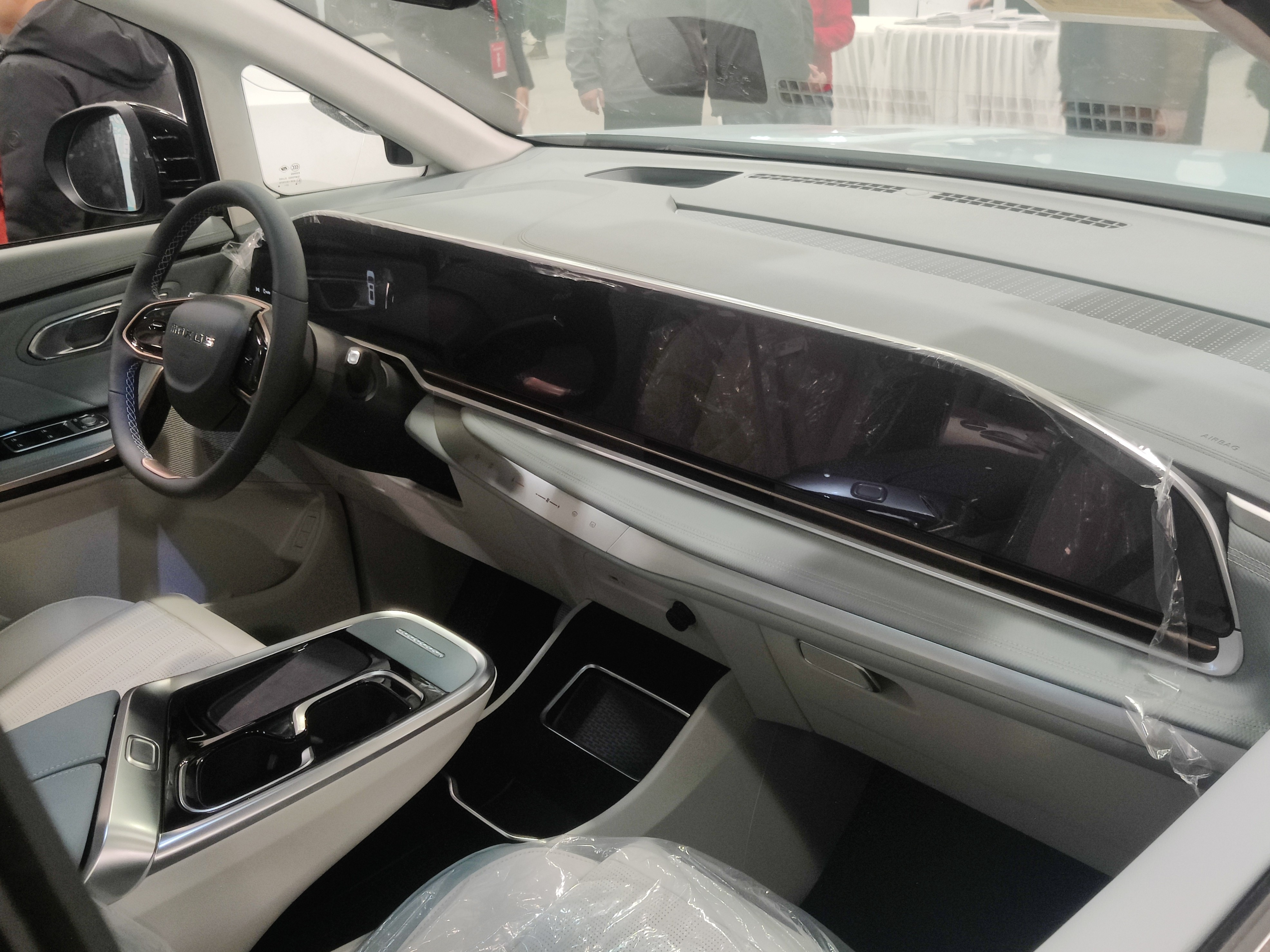
Interior

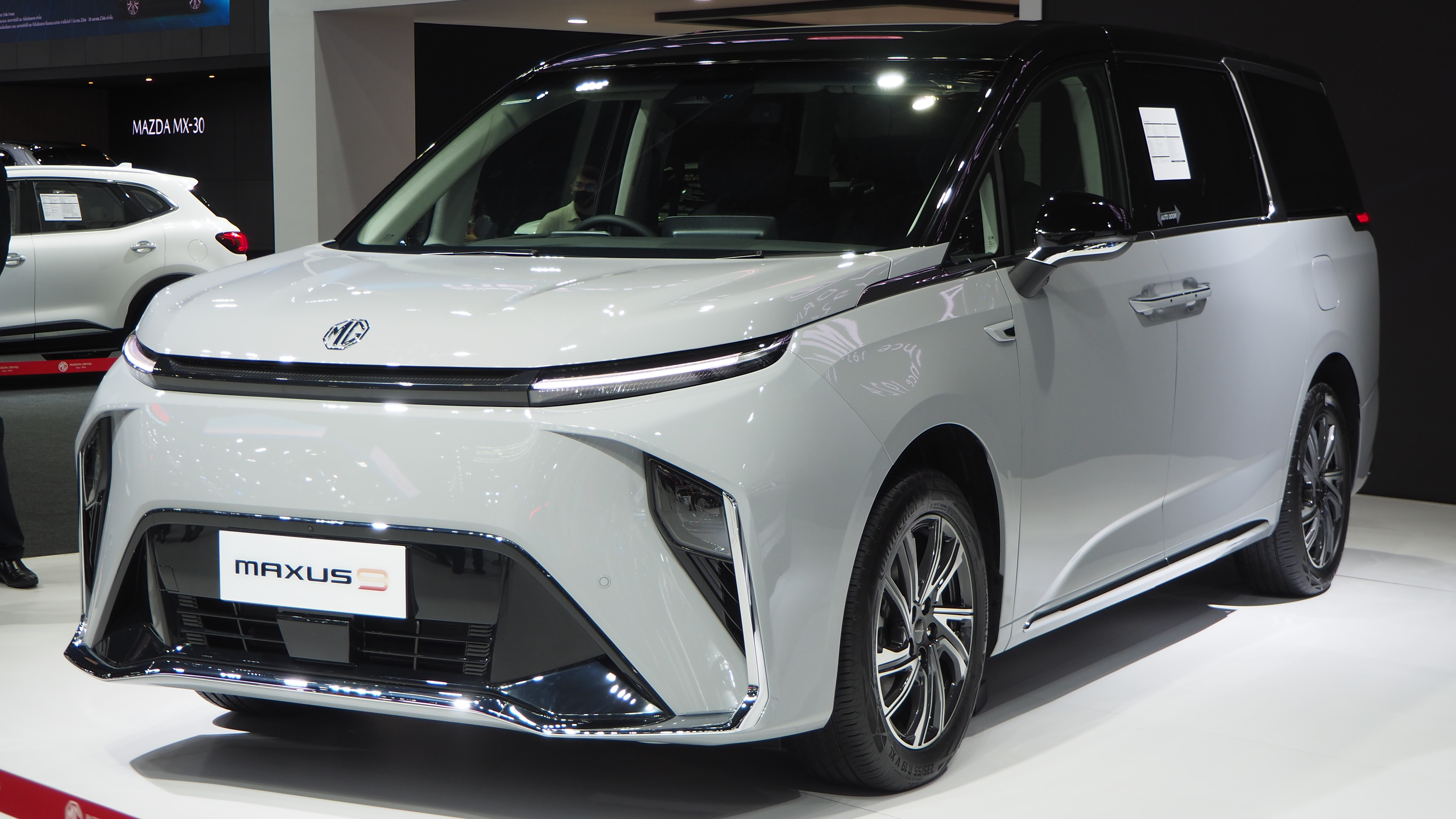
MG Maxus 9

=== Safety ===
ANCAP test results LDV MIFA seven seat variants (2022, aligned with Euro NCAP)
Test	Points	%
Overall:	5 /5 stars	
Adult occupant:	35.53	93%
Child occupant:	43.41	88%
Pedestrian:	39.59	73%
Safety assist:	14.43	90%

ANCAP test results LDV MIFA 9 all variants (2022, aligned with Euro NCAP)
Test	Points	%
Overall:	5 /5 stars	
Adult occupant:	35.53	93%
Child occupant:	43.41	88%
Pedestrian:	39.59	73%
Safety assist:	14.43	90%

Euro NCAP test results Maxus MIFA 9 (LHD) (2022)
Test	Points	%
Overall:	5 /5 stars	
Adult occupant:	35.5	93%
Child occupant:	44	89%
Pedestrian:	39.6	73%
Safety assist:	13.4	83%
