= Roewe iMAX8 =

Chinese minivan

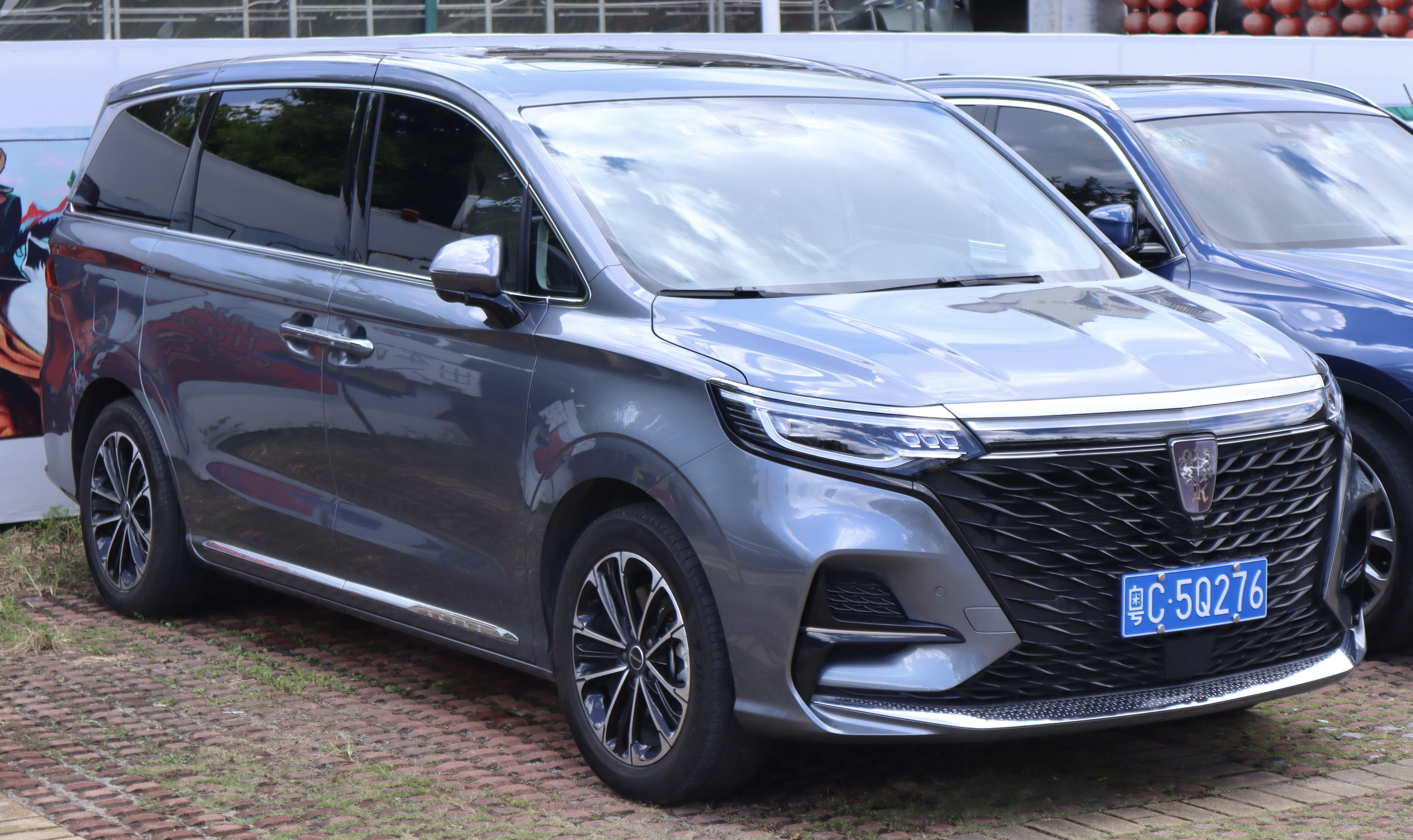

Overview
- Manufacturer: Roewe (SAIC Motor)
- Model code: IM31
- Production: 2020–present
- Assembly: China: Wuxi

Body and chassis
- Class: Minivan (M)
- Body style: 5-door minivan
- Layout: Front-engine, front wheel drive
- Related: Maxus G20

Powertrain
- Engine: 2.0 L 20A4E I4 turbo petrol
- Electric motor: Permanent magnet synchronous motor (iMAX8 EV)
- Power output: 234 PS (172.1 kW; 230.8 hp) (iMAX8); 245 PS (180.2 kW; 241.6 hp) (iMAX8 EV)
- Transmission: 8-speed automatic

Dimensions
- Wheelbase: 3,000 mm (118.1 in)
- Length: 5,016 mm (197.5 in)
- Width: 1,909 mm (75.2 in)
- Height: 1,782 mm (70.2 in)
- Curb weight: 2,058 kg (4,537 lb)

The Roewe iMAX8 is a minivan produced by SAIC Motor under the Roewe marque since 2020. It was revealed in September 2020 at Auto China.

== Overview ==
=== Concept model ===
The Roewe iMAX8 was first previewed by the Vision-iM concept at Auto Guangzhou in November 2019 under Roewe's Vision series of concept vehicles, then as a more-detailed concept called iM8 at the Roewe Brand Day event in May 2020.

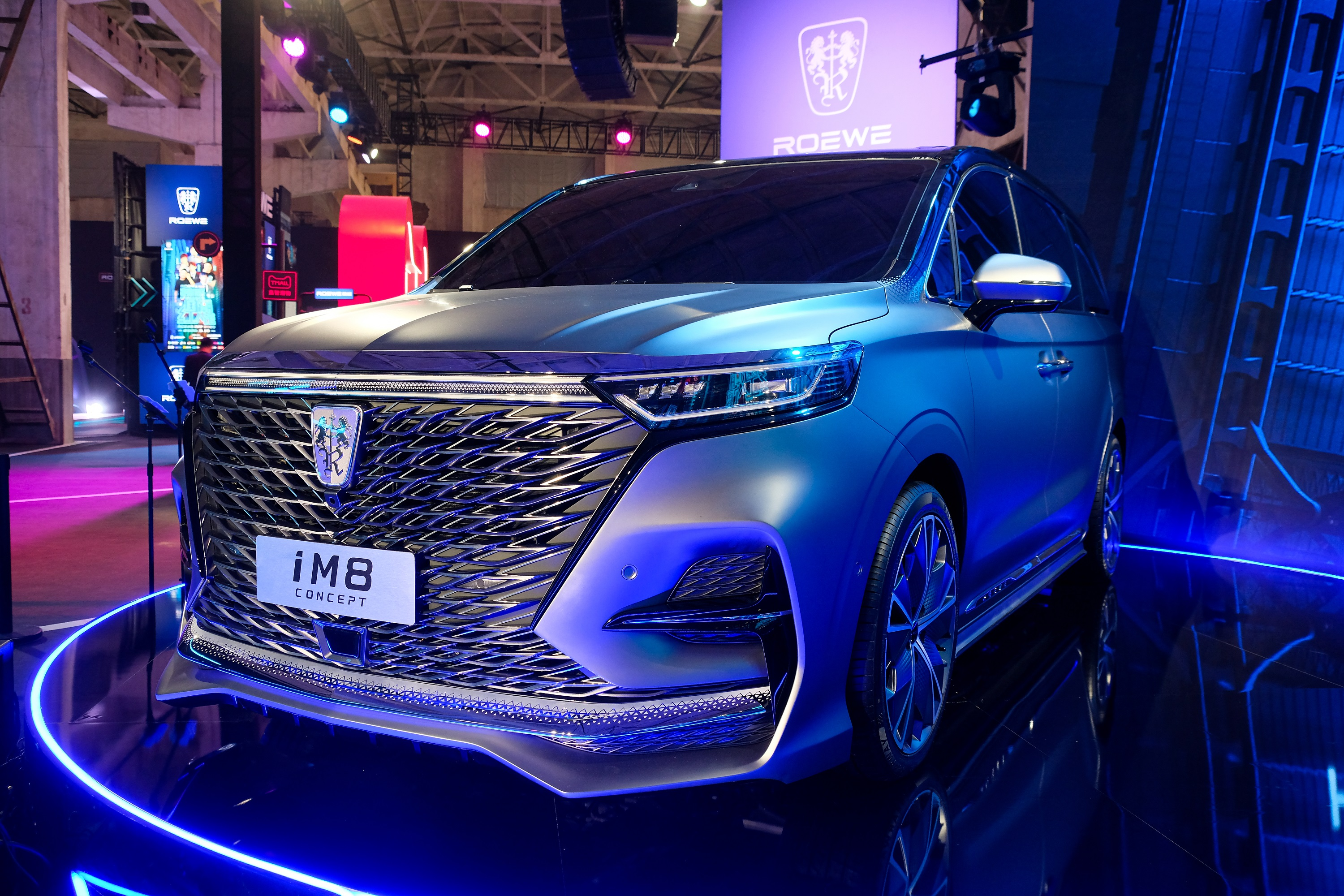
Roewe iM8 Concept

=== Production model ===
The iMAX8 was revealed in September 2020 at the 2020 Auto China event in Beijing, China, as a production model with few changes from the iM8 concept. It is based on the all new SIGMA platform developed by SAIC Motor.

The iMAX8 is only available in petrol version at launch. The petrol version is powered by a 2.0-litre turbocharged four-cylinder engine delivering 172 kW (231 hp; 234 PS) mated to an Aisin eight-speed automatic transmission. Production of the iMAX8 is planned to start in autumn of 2020. It is the first minivan under the Roewe brand.

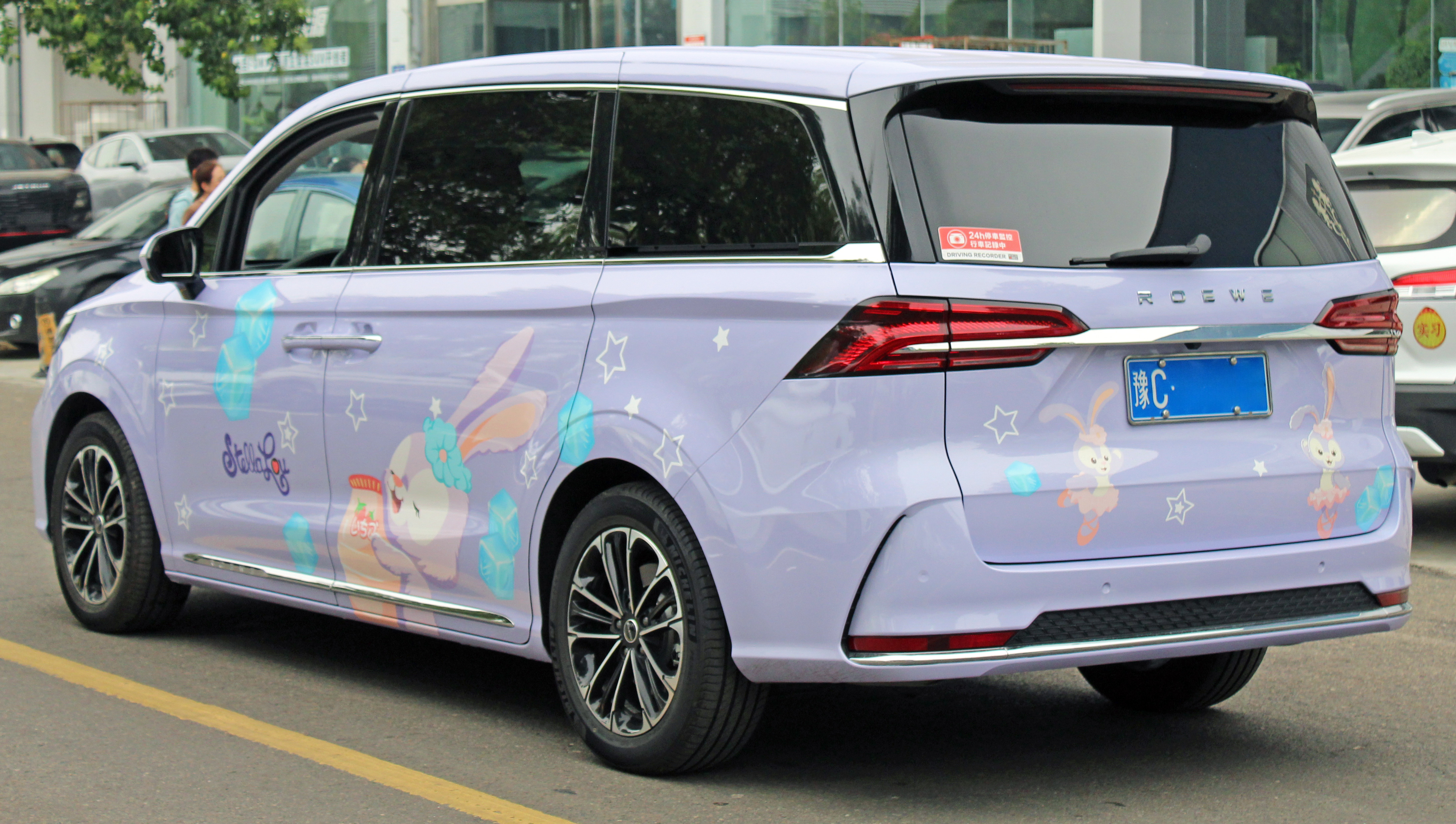
Rear view

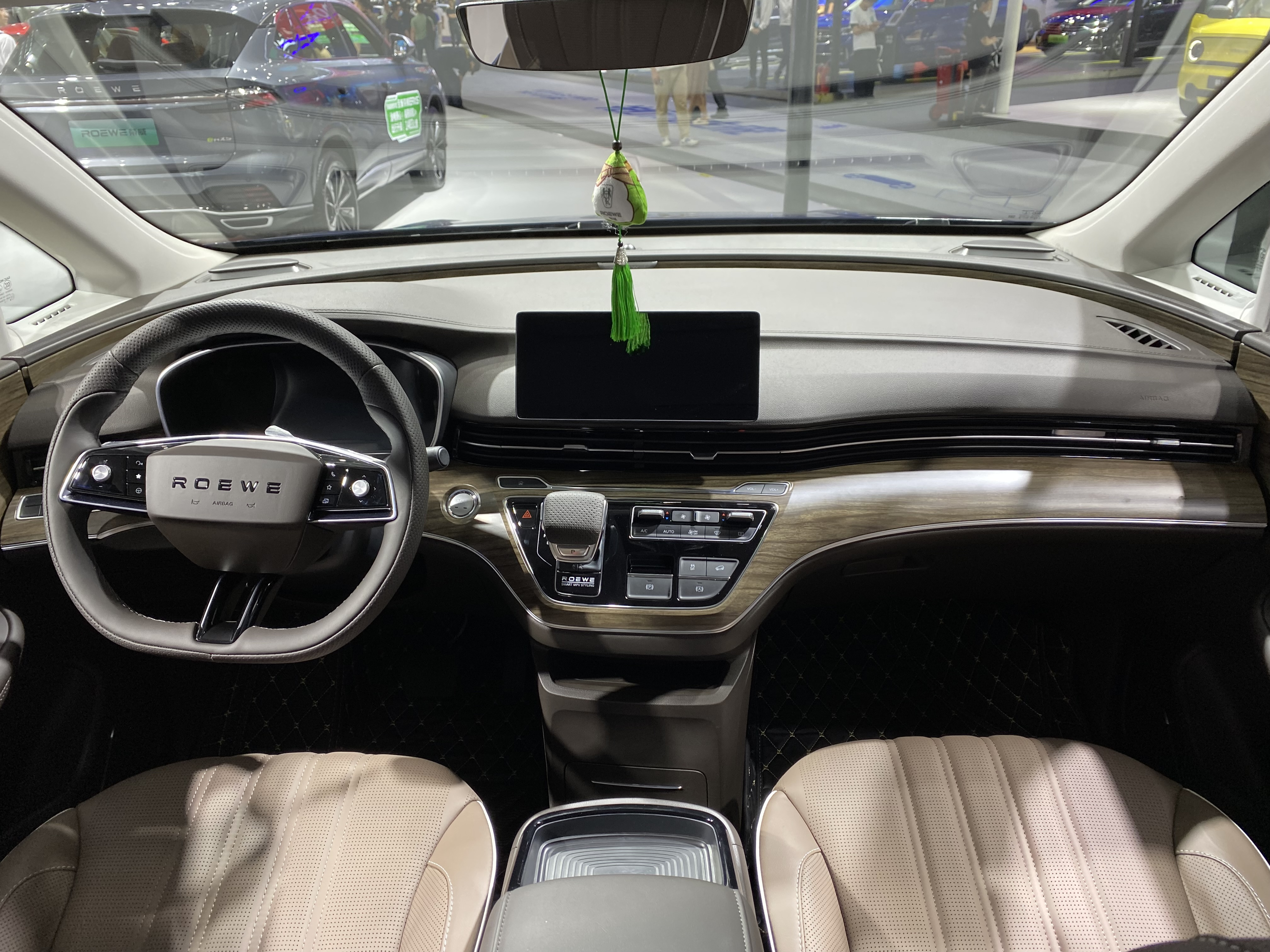
Interior

== Features ==
The Roewe iMAX8 features include a digital instrument cluster, automatic climate control, and keyless entry.

== Roewe iMAX8 EV ==
The iMAX8 EV was launched in August 2022 with a slightly different grille compared to the gasoline version. The iMAX8 EV is powered by an electric motor with 180 kW and a peak torque of 350 Nm. The battery of the iMAX8 EV is a 90 kWh SAIC Rubik's cube battery supporting a 550 to 570 km cruising range. The energy consumption is 16.7 kWh per 100 km.

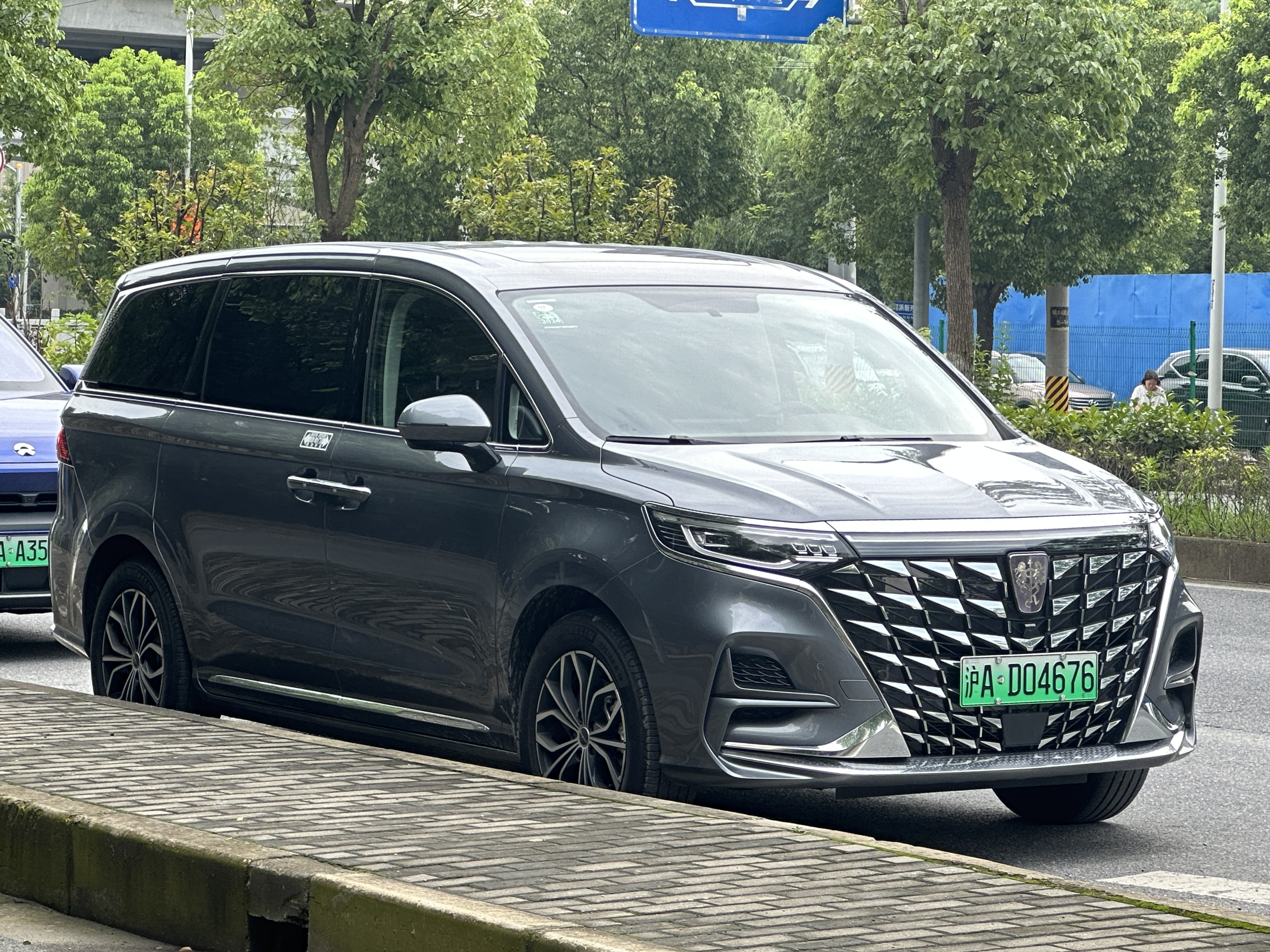
Roewe iMAX8 EV

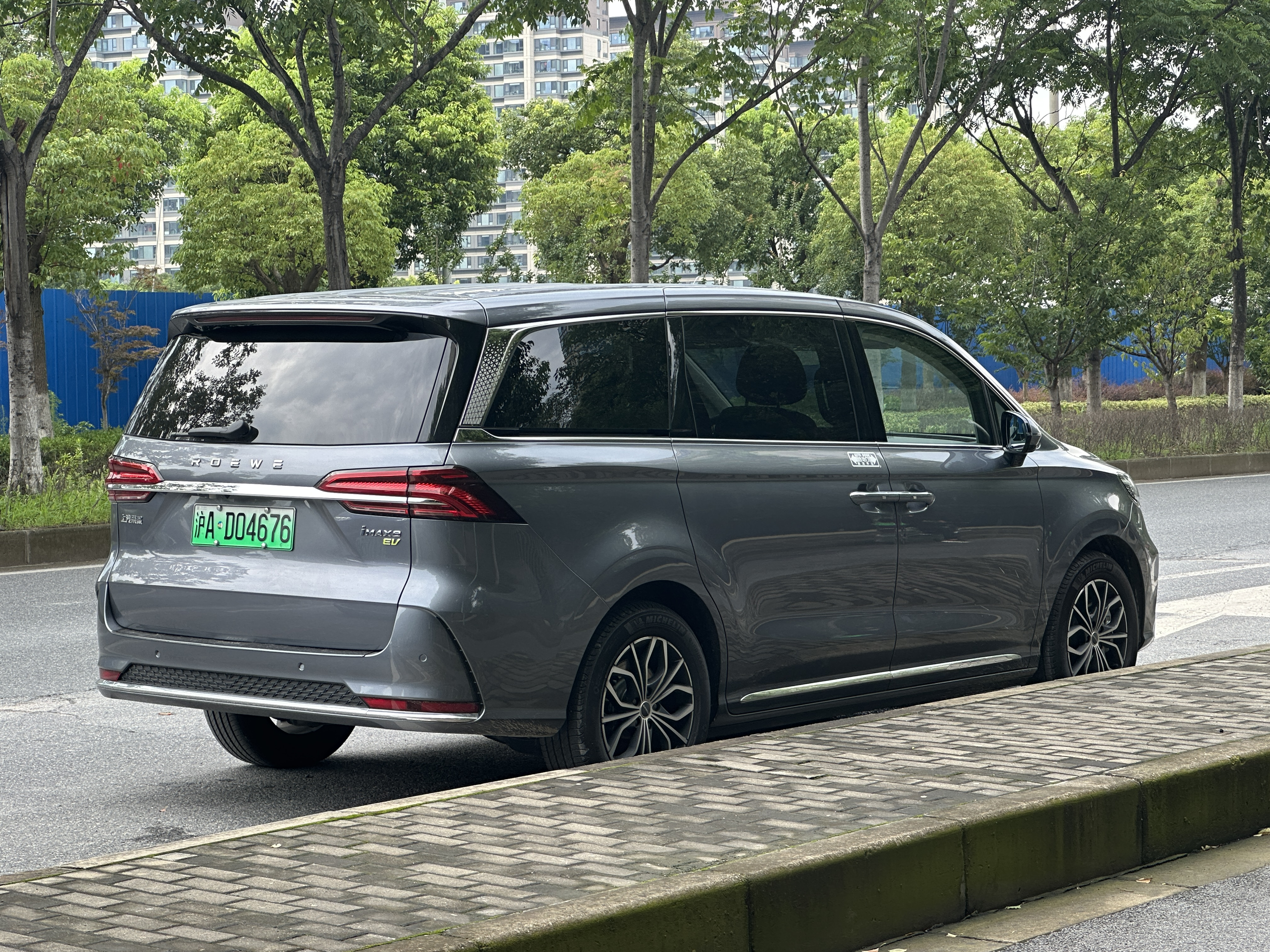
Rear view
