= Maxus G10 =

Maxus/LDV G10
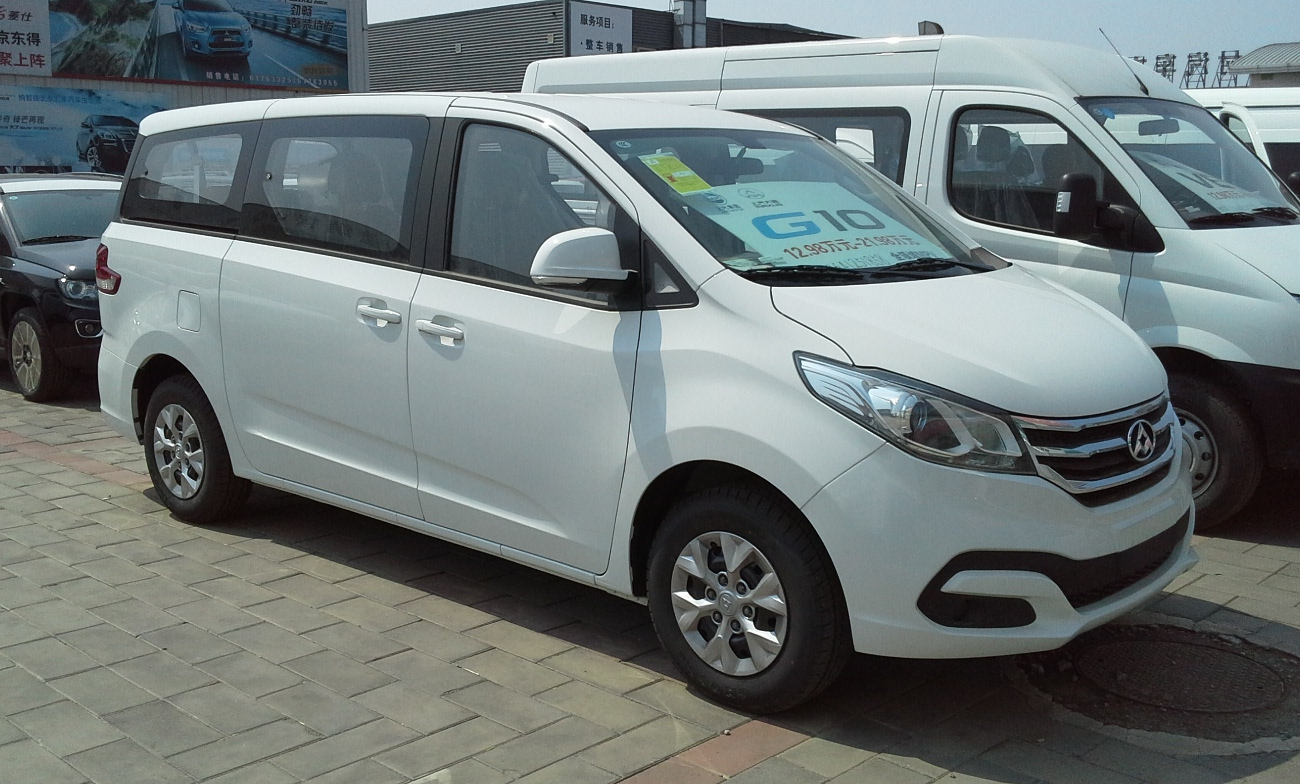

Overview
- Manufacturer: Maxus (SAIC Motor)
- Also called: LDV G10 (Australia); Maxus G10 Max (Since 2024); Avior G10 (Belarus and Russia); MG G10
- Production: 2014–present
- Assembly: Wuxi, China (Maxus)
- Designer: Torino Design

Body and chassis
- Class: Minivan
- Body style: 5-door van
- Layout: Front-engine, rear-wheel-drive (ICE engine); Rear-motor, rear-wheel-drive (Electric)

Powertrain
- Engine: Petrol: 2.0 L 20L4E turbo I4; 2.4 L 4G69 I4 (2014–2016); Diesel: 1.9 L Multijet II turbo I4
- Electric motor: High-power Permanent Magnet-Synchronous Motor (EG10 electric van)
- Power output: 107 kW (143 hp; 145 PS) (2.4 Mitsubishi); 168 kW (225 hp; 228 PS) (2.0 Turbo); 112 kW (150 hp; 152 PS) (1.9 Diesel); 150 kW (201 hp; 204 PS) (G10 Electric)
- Transmission: 5-speed manual (2014–2016); 6-speed manual (2014–present); 6-speed ZF 6HP21 automatic; Single-speed Automatic (EV)
- Battery: 54 or 71.8 kWh Ternary Lithium IP67 (G10 Electric)

Dimensions
- Wheelbase: 3,198 mm (125.9 in) (Australia); 3,210 mm (126.4 in) (China)
- Length: 5,168 mm (203.5 in)
- Width: 1,980 mm (78.0 in)
- Height: 1,928 mm (75.9 in)

Chronology
- Predecessor: Maxus Istana; Maxus G20 (for G10 MAX)
- Successor: Maxus G20 / Maxus G90 (China)

The Maxus G10 is a minivan launched on the Chinese car market in April 2014.

== Overview ==
The Maxus G10 is the second car under the Maxus brand following the Maxus V80 van, which is a sub-brand owned by the Shanghai Automotive Industry Corporation (SAIC). It is available in 7, 9, and 10 seat configurations.

In Malaysia, the Maxus G10 was launched in April 2016 with two variants: Luxury and Sport. An SE variant was launched a year later in June 2017. All variants of the Maxus G10 in Malaysia is powered by a 2.0 litre turbocharged direct injection petrol engine capable of producing 225 hp at 5,500 rpm and 345 Nm at 4,000 rpm.

== Maxus EG10 electric van ==
The Maxus EG10 electric van was based on the Maxus G10 van and was launched on the Chinese car market in early 2016 with the benefits of green-car subsidies from the Chinese government. With a range of only 150 kilometers, the electric EG10 is powered by an electric motor with an output of 204hp and 800nm of torque.

== Safety ==
ANCAP test results LDV G10 all people mover variants (2015)
Test	Score
Overall	3 /5 stars
Frontal offset	9.37/16
Side impact	16/16
Pole	Not Assessed
Seat belt reminders	1/3
Whiplash protection	Not Assessed
Pedestrian protection	Not Assessed
Electronic stability control	Standard

ANCAP test results LDV G10 all van variants (2015)
Test	Score
Overall	3 /5 stars
Frontal offset	9.37/16
Side impact	16/16
Pole	Not Assessed
Seat belt reminders	1/3
Whiplash protection	Not Assessed
Pedestrian protection	Not Assessed
Electronic stability control	Not Assessed

ANCAP test results LDV G10 (2022)
Overall
Grading:	5% (Not recommended)

== Gallery ==
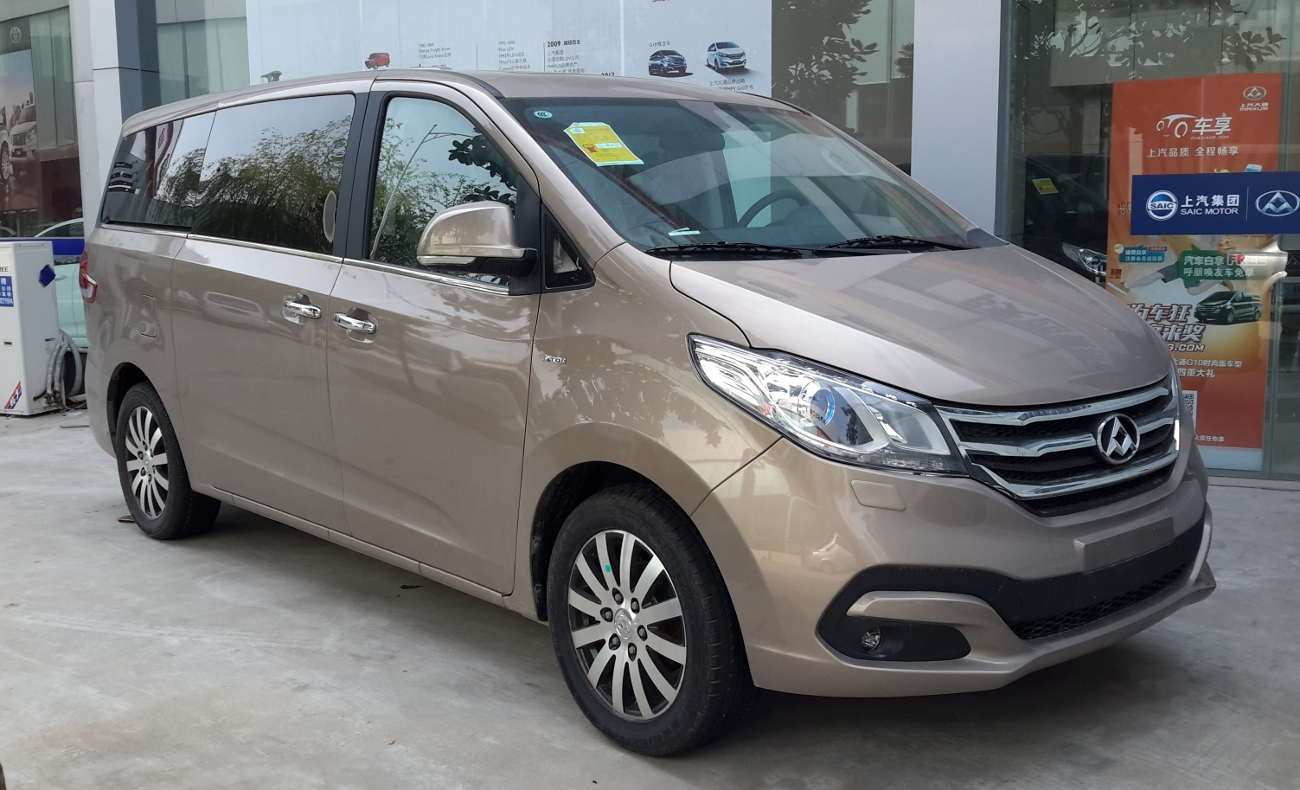
Maxus G10 van (Front, pre-facelift)

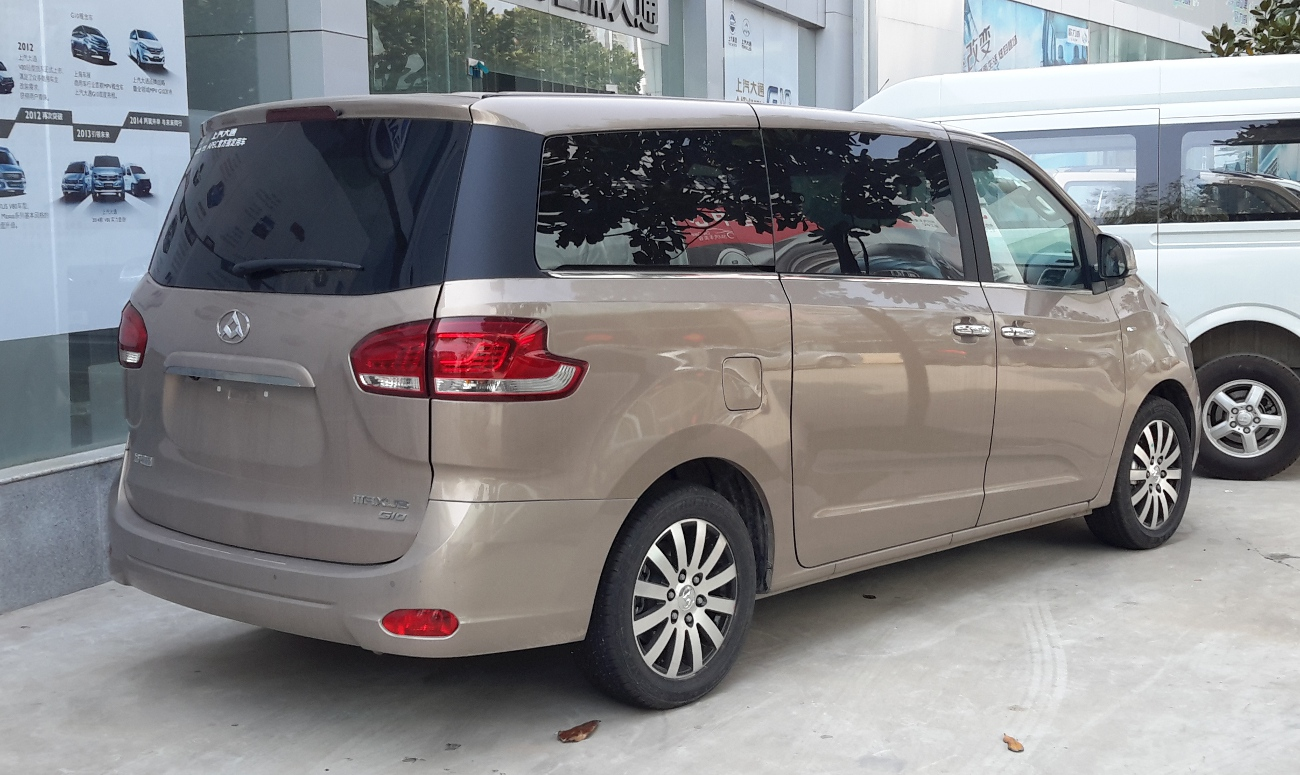
Maxus G10 van (Rear, pre-facelift)

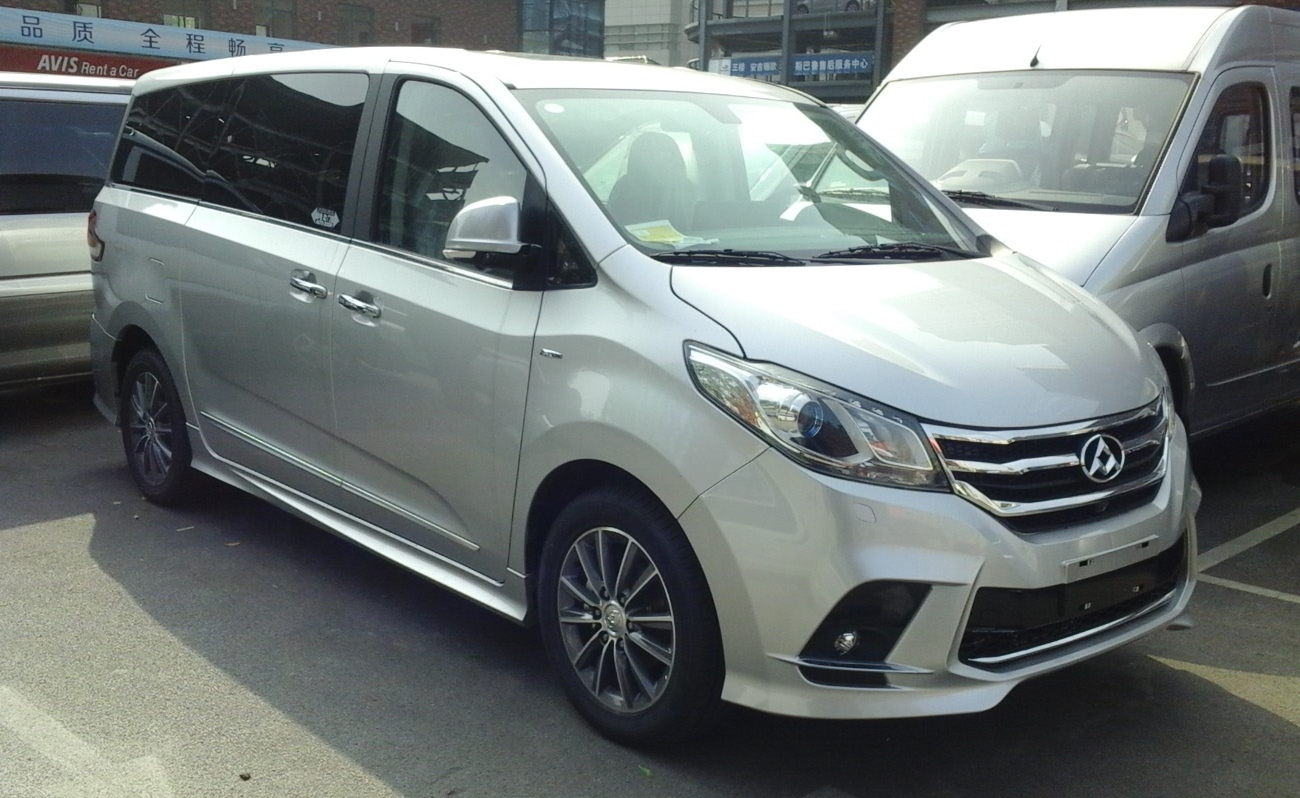
Maxus G10 van (Front, facelift)

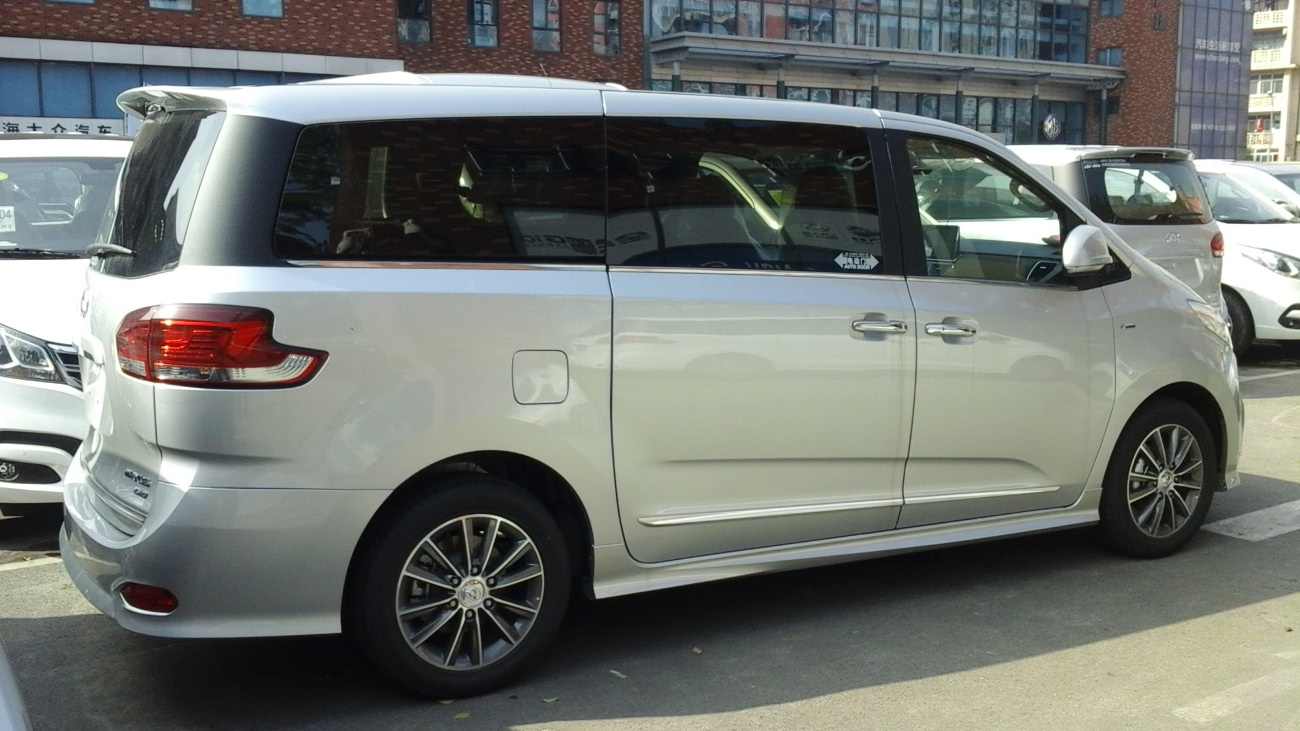
Maxus G10 van (Rear, facelift)

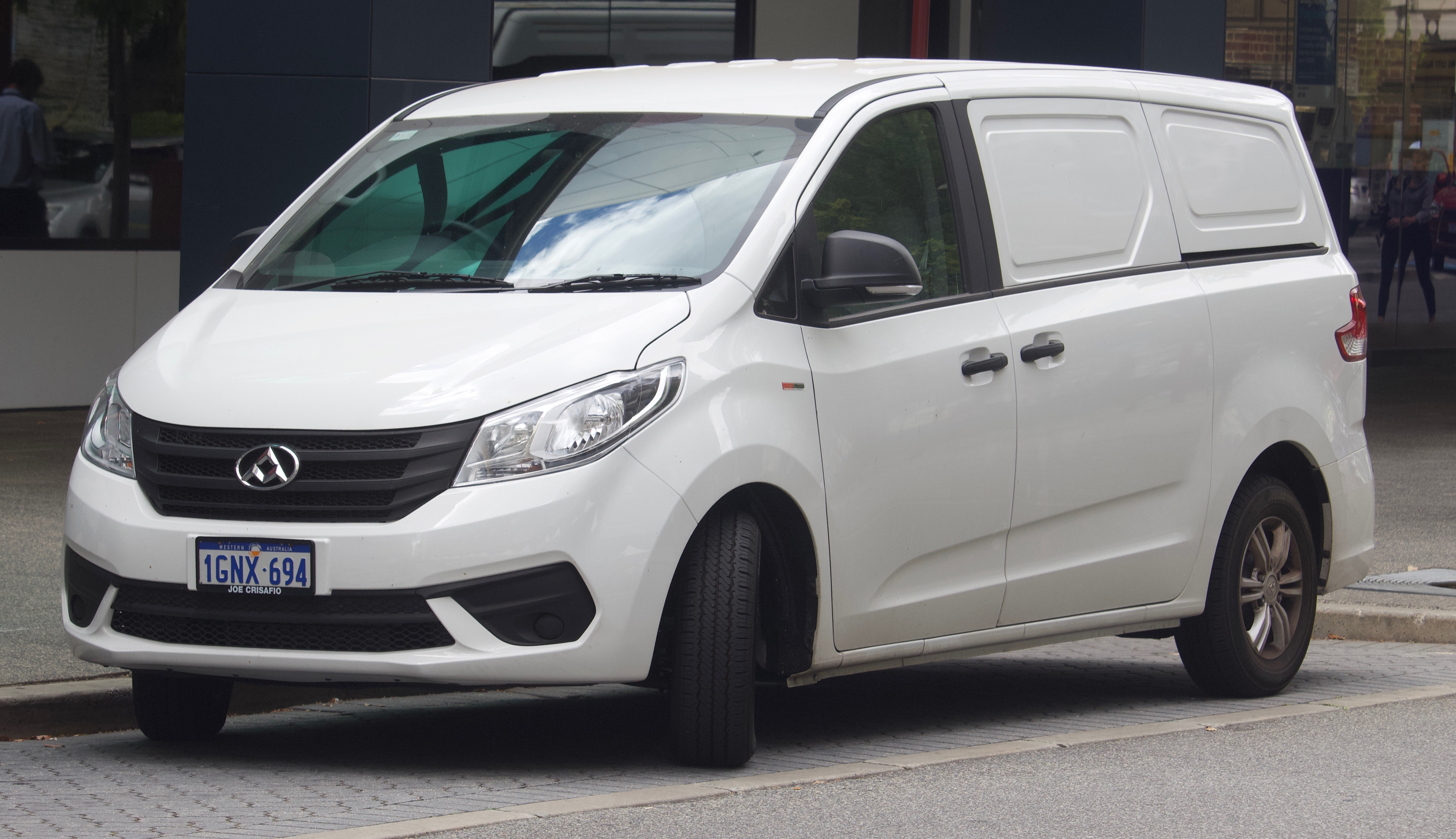
LDV G10 van (SV7C, Australia)

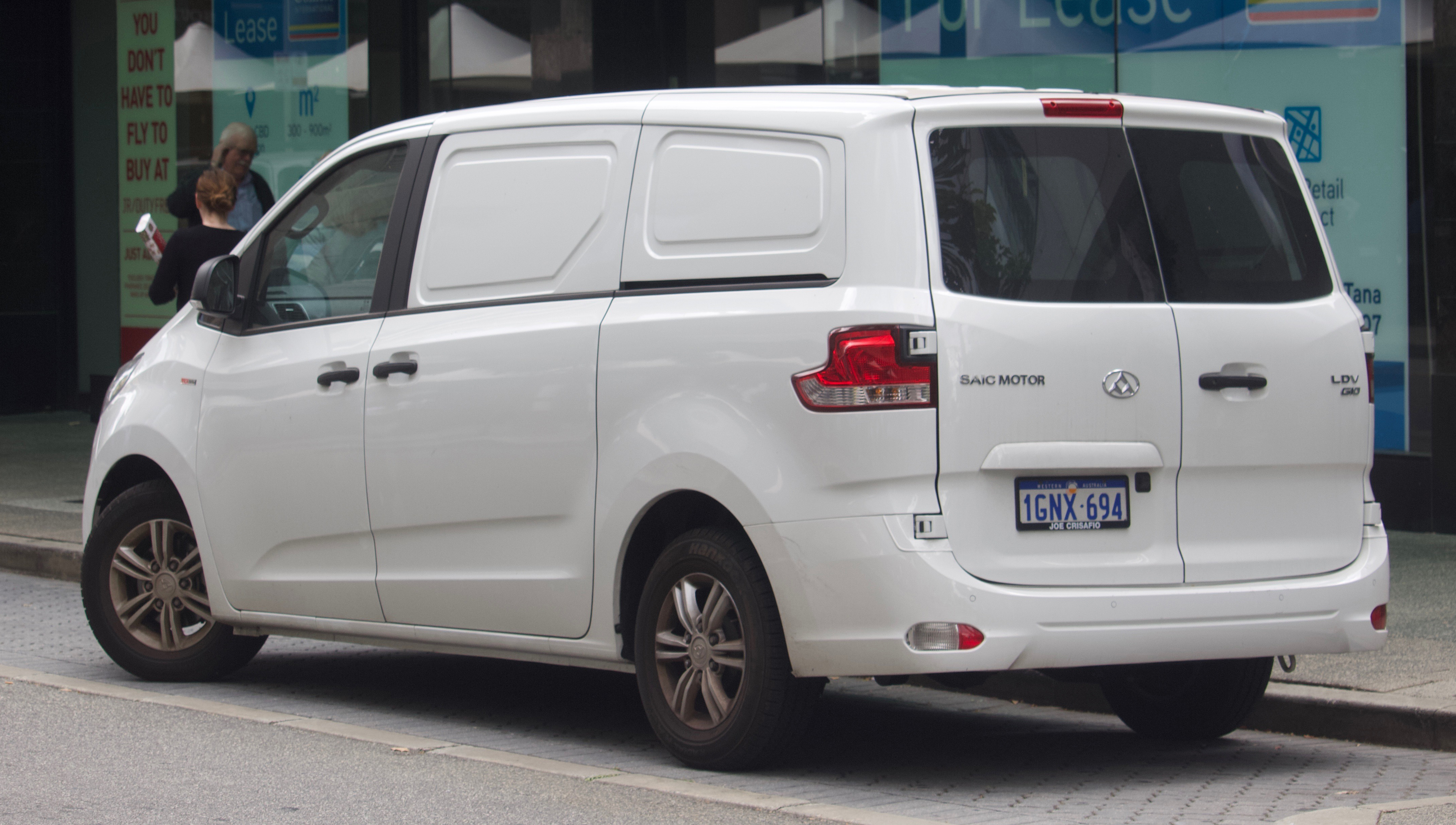
LDV G10 van (SV7C, Australia)

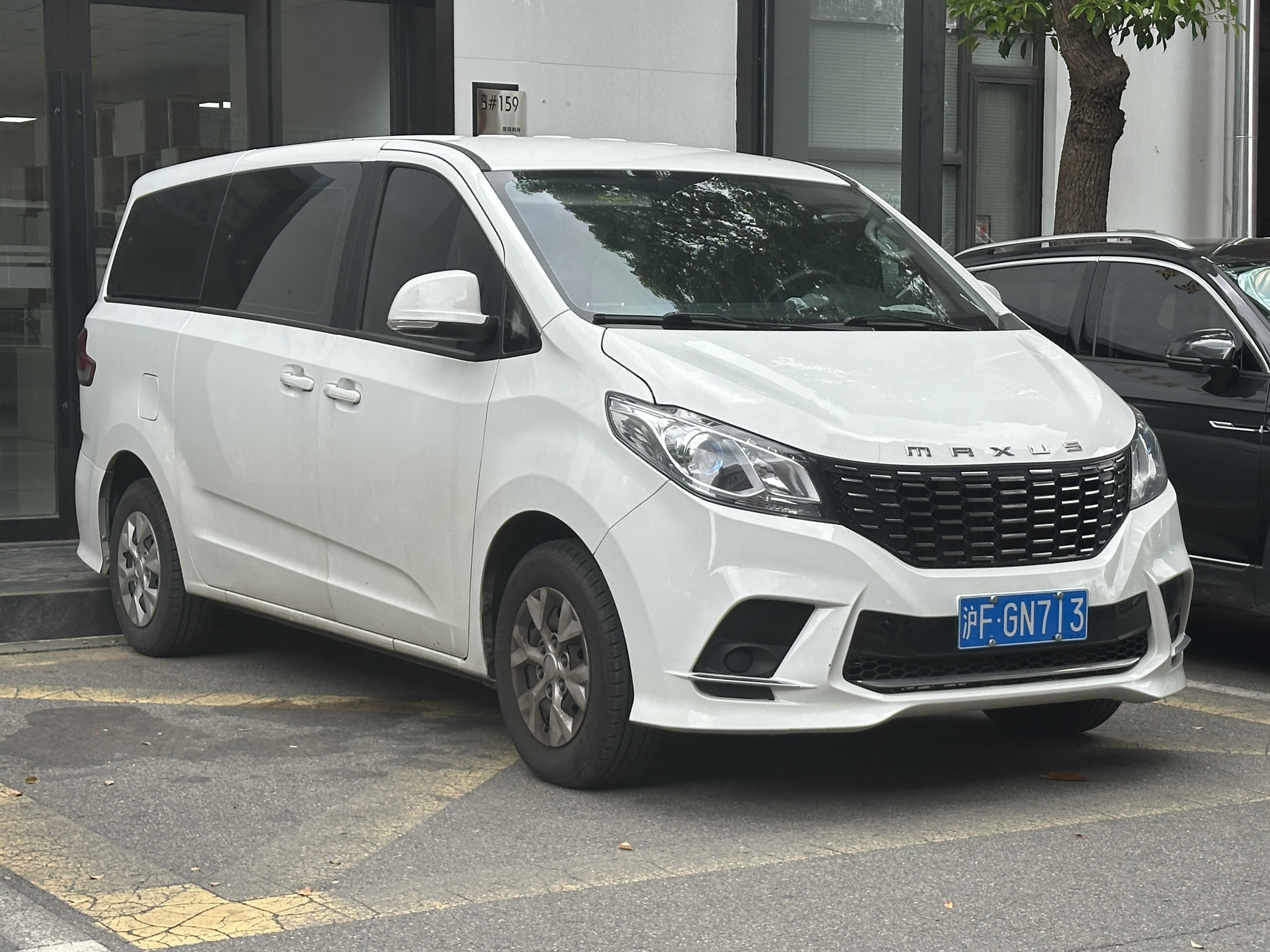
Maxus G10 (Front, facelift)

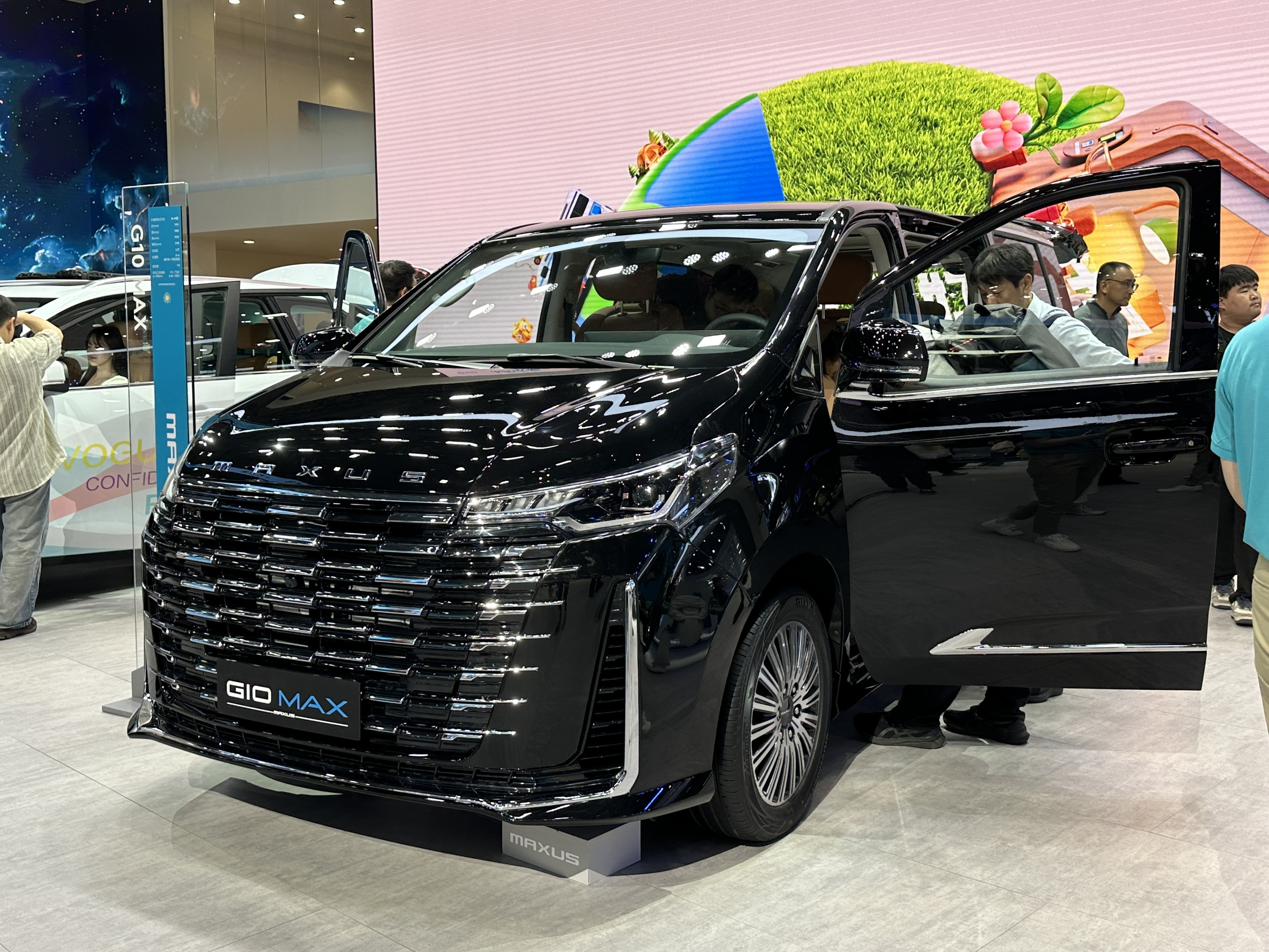
Maxus G10 MAX
