= Maxus G20 =

Chinese minivan

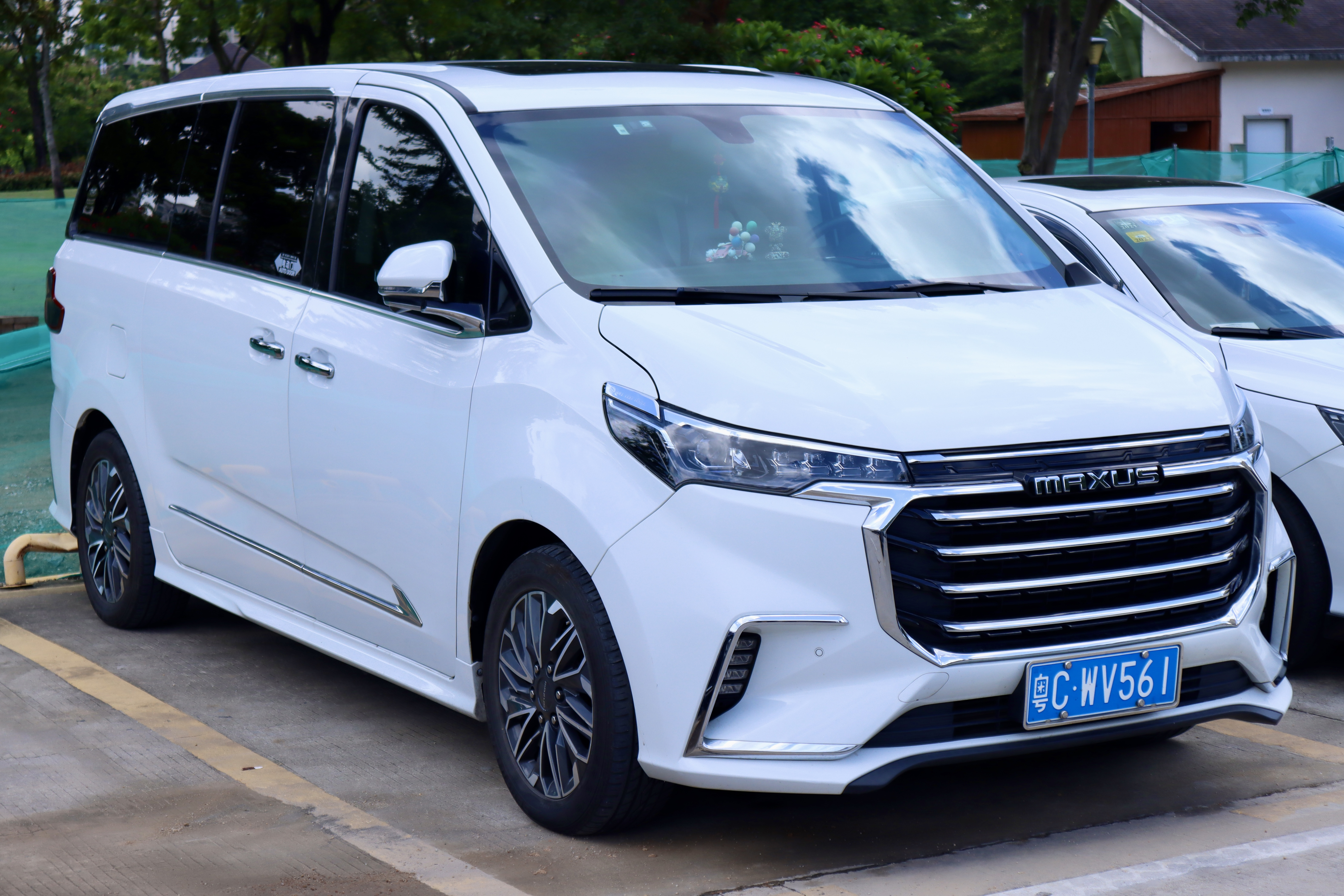

Overview
- Manufacturer: Maxus (SAIC Motor)
- Production: 2019–2025
- Assembly: China: Wuxi

Body and chassis
- Class: Minivan
- Body style: 5-door minivan
- Layout: Front-engine, Rear wheel drive
- Related: Roewe iMAX8

Powertrain
- Engine: 2.0 L G20FC I4 turbo petrol; 2.0 L SAIC π I4 turbo-diesel
- Power output: 122 kW (164 hp; 166 PS) (SAIC π); 167 kW (224 hp; 227 PS) (G20FC)
- Transmission: 8-speed ZF 8HP automatic

Dimensions
- Wheelbase: 3,198 mm (125.9 in)
- Length: 5,198 mm (204.6 in)
- Width: 1,980 mm (78.0 in)
- Height: 1,928 mm (75.9 in)
- Curb weight: 1,857 kg (4,094 lb)

Chronology
- Predecessor: Maxus G10
- Successor: Maxus G10 Max

The Maxus G20 is a minivan launched on the Chinese car market in April 2019 during the Shanghai Auto Show by Maxus. Maxus is a sub-brand owned by the Shanghai Automotive Industry Corporation (SAIC). The G20 is similar to the Maxus G10 released in 2014 and has a heavily redesigned interior and exterior.

== Overview ==
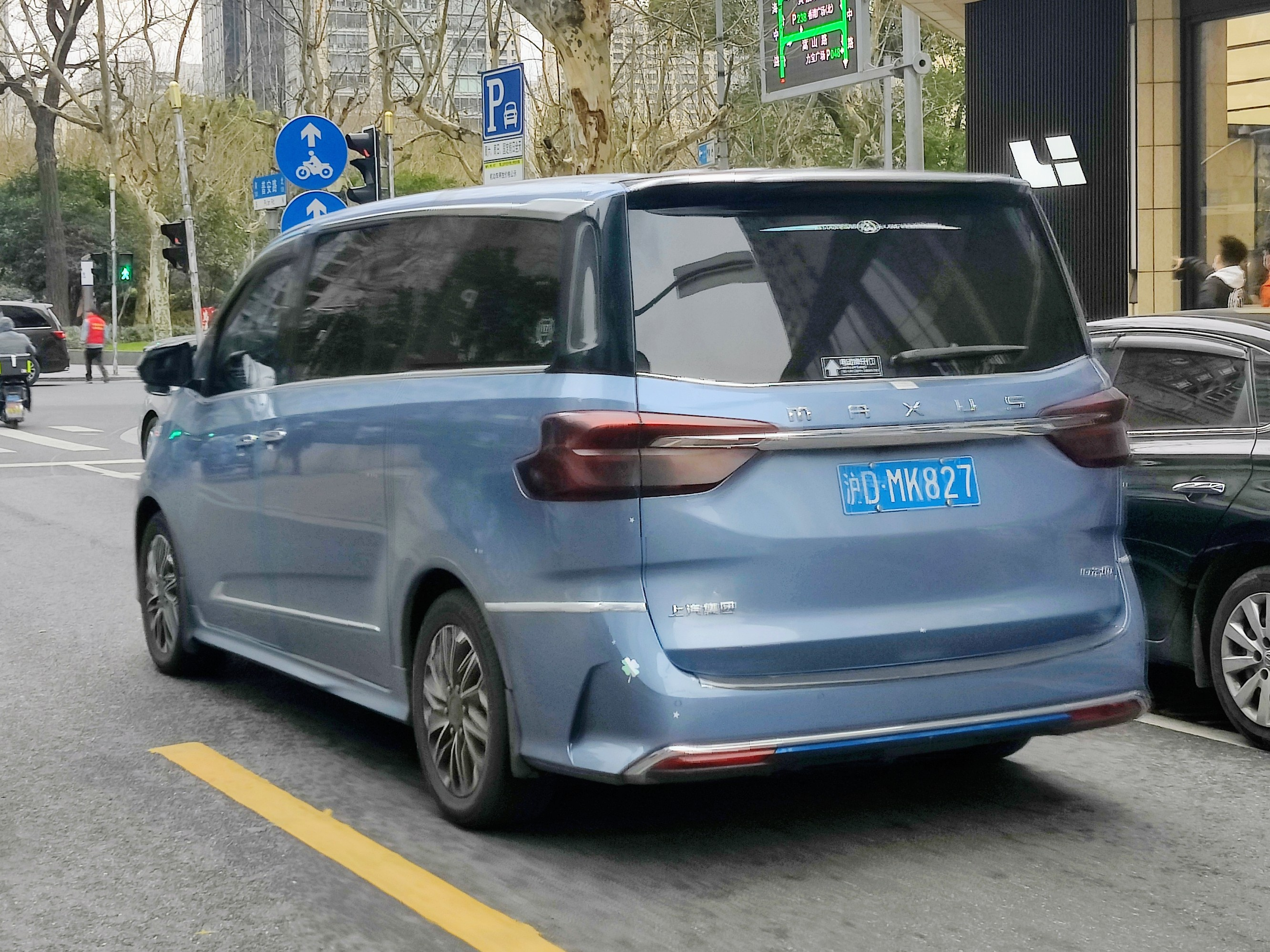
Rear view

The G20 is available in three models: Luxury, Luxury Executive and Deluxe. The G20 is available with 2 engine options, a 2.0L direct injection turbo gasoline engine producing 160 kW (218 PS; 215 bhp) and 350 N⋅m (258 lb⋅ft) and a SAIC π 2.0L turbo diesel engine producing 120 kW (163 PS; 161 bhp) and 375 N⋅m (277 lb⋅ft) both using a ZF-8AT eight speed automatic transmission. Price of the Maxus G20 ranges from CN¥183,800 to 289,800.

A hydrogen powered fuel cell concept of the G20 the G20FC was unveiled at the 2019 Shanghai Auto Show. The G20FC is powered by a 150 kW (204 PS; 201 bhp) fuel cell that has a driving range of up to 550 kilometres (340 mi) and has a refueling time of five minutes. The G20FC is claimed to be world's first fuel cell multi purpose vehicle (MPV).

== Maxus Euniq 7 (2020–2023) ==
The Maxus Euniq 7 is the electric version of the gasoline-powered Maxus G20. The Euniq 7 was launched 2020.

== Maxus Mifa (hydrogen version) (2022–2023) ==
The Maxus Mifa is the hydrogen version of the Maxus G20.
