= Maxus G70 =

Chinese minivan

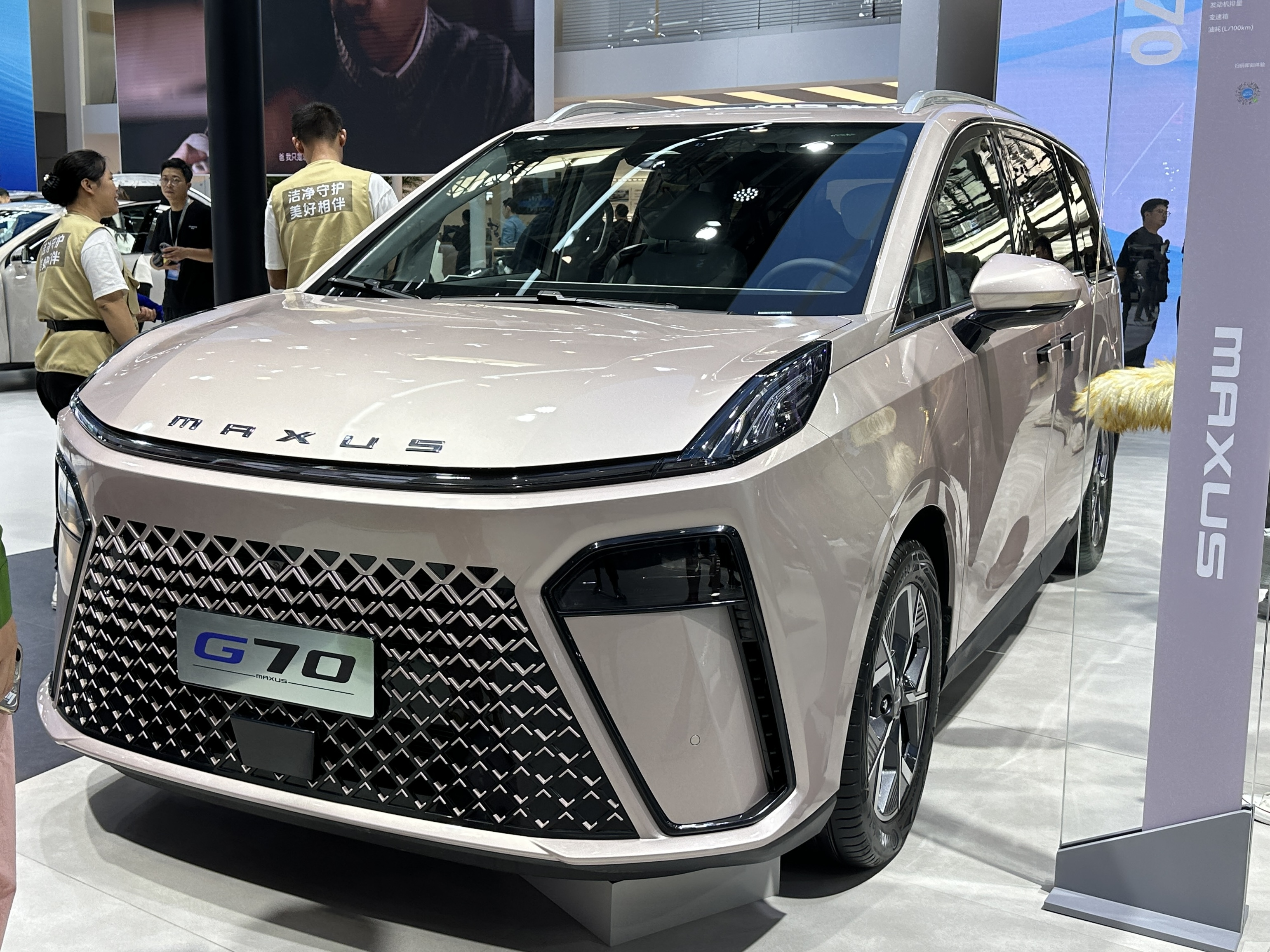

Overview
- Manufacturer: Maxus (SAIC Motor)
- Production: 2023–present
- Assembly: China: Wuxi

Body and chassis
- Class: Minivan
- Body style: 5-door minivan
- Layout: Front-engine, Front wheel drive

Powertrain
- Engine: Petrol: 2.0 L 20A4E I4 turbo
- Electric motor: Belt-Driven Starter Generator
- Power output: 172 kW (231 hp; 234 PS)
- Transmission: 9-speed ZF 9HP automatic
- Hybrid drivetrain: Mild hybrid

Dimensions
- Wheelbase: 2,690 mm (105.9 in)
- Length: 4,900 mm (192.9 in)
- Width: 1,885 mm (74.2 in)
- Height: 1,756 mm (69.1 in)
- Curb weight: 1,890 kg (4,167 lb)

The Maxus G70 is a minivan manufactured by SAIC Motor and sold under its Maxus division. It was unveiled, along with the battery electric Maxus Mifa 7 based on it, at the 2023 Guangzhou Auto Show. It slots above the Maxus G50 and below the Maxus G90 in the company's product lineup.

== Gallery ==
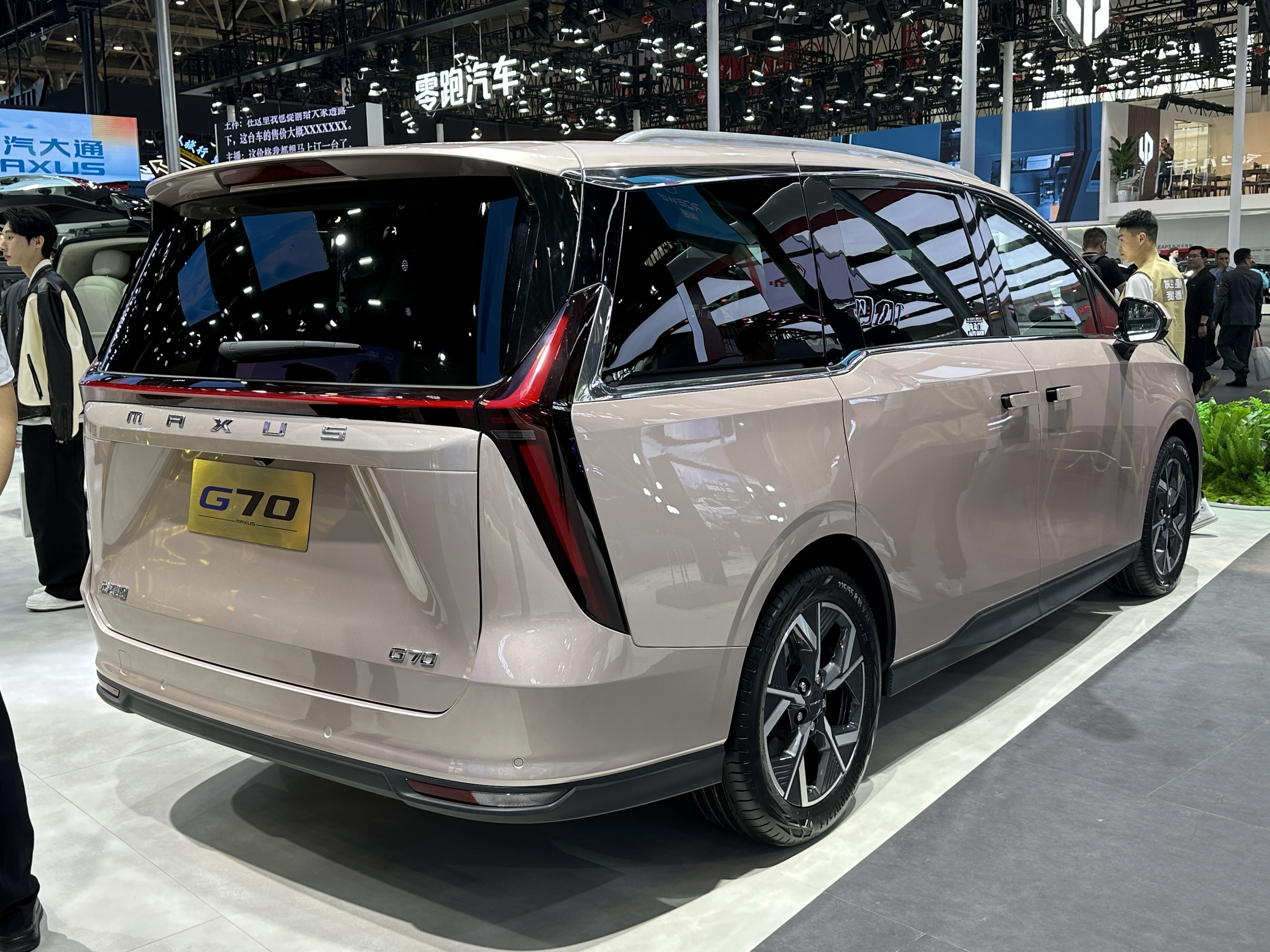
Rear view

== Maxus Mifa 7 ==
Maxus Mifa 7
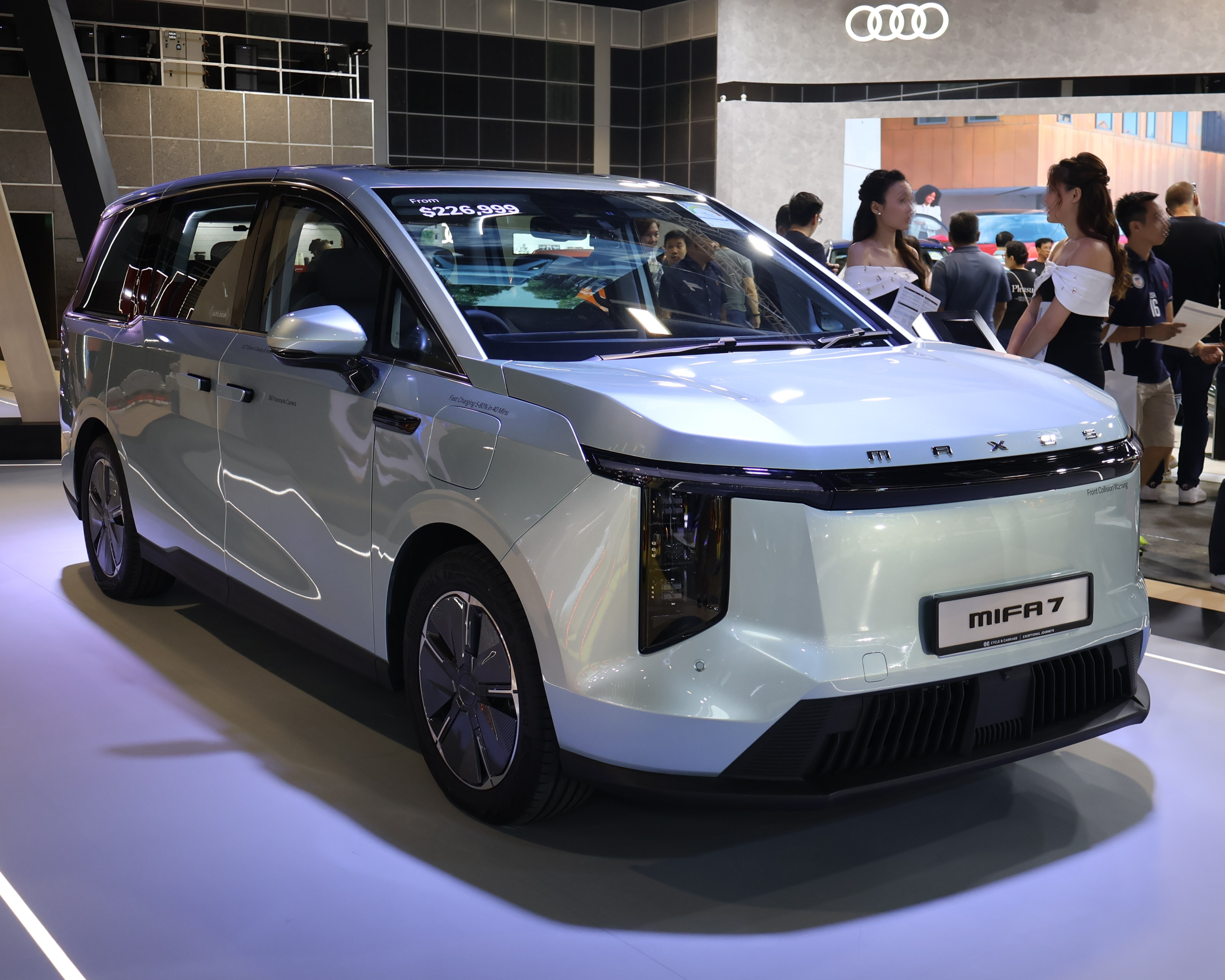
- Maxus Mifa 7 (EV)

Overview
- Manufacturer: Maxus (SAIC Motor)
- Also called: MG Maxus 7 (Thailand)
- Production: 2023–present
- Assembly: China: Wuxi; Indonesia: Purwakarta (National Assemblers)

Body and chassis
- Class: Minivan
- Body style: 5-door minivan
- Layout: Front-motor, Front wheel drive

Powertrain
- Engine: 1.5 L SAIC 3rd gen NetBlue 15FKE I4
- Electric motor: Permanent magnet synchronous
- Power output: EV: 180 kW (241 hp; 245 PS); PHEV: 110 kW (148 hp; 150 PS) (Engine); 176 kW (236 hp; 239 PS) (Electric Motor); 175 kW (235 hp; 238 PS) (Combined)
- Transmission: DHT-2 hybrid Specific
- Hybrid drivetrain: PHEV (Mifa 7 PHEV)
- Battery: EV: 64 kWh, 77 kWh or 90 kWh NMC; PHEV: 24.7 or 39.7 kWh NMC
- Electric range: 526–605 km (327–376 mi)

Dimensions
- Wheelbase: 2,675 mm (105.3 in)
- Length: 4,907 mm (193.2 in)
- Width: 1,885 mm (74.2 in)
- Height: 1,756 mm (69.1 in)
- Curb weight: 2,200 kg (4,850 lb)

The Maxus Mifa 7 is a battery electric and plug-in hybrid minivan manufactured by SAIC Motor and sold under its Maxus division. It is the electric version of the G70. It slots above the Maxus Mifa 5, and below the Maxus Mifa 9.

=== Markets ===
==== Indonesia ====
The Maxus Mifa 7 was launched in Indonesia on 22 November 2024 at the 2024 Gaikindo Jakarta Auto Week alongside the Mifa 9. Initially imported from China, it is available as a battery electric model using the 90 kWh battery pack, in the sole variant. Local assembly commenced in Indonesia in June 2025 at the PT National Assemblers plant.

==== Singapore ====
The Maxus Mifa 7 was launched in Singapore on 28 August 2024. It is available as a battery electric model using the 90 kWh battery pack, in two variants: Luxury and Premium.

==== Thailand ====
In Thailand, it is marketed as the MG Maxus 7 and was launched on 14 June 2024. It is available as a battery electric model using the 90 kWh battery pack, in the sole variant.

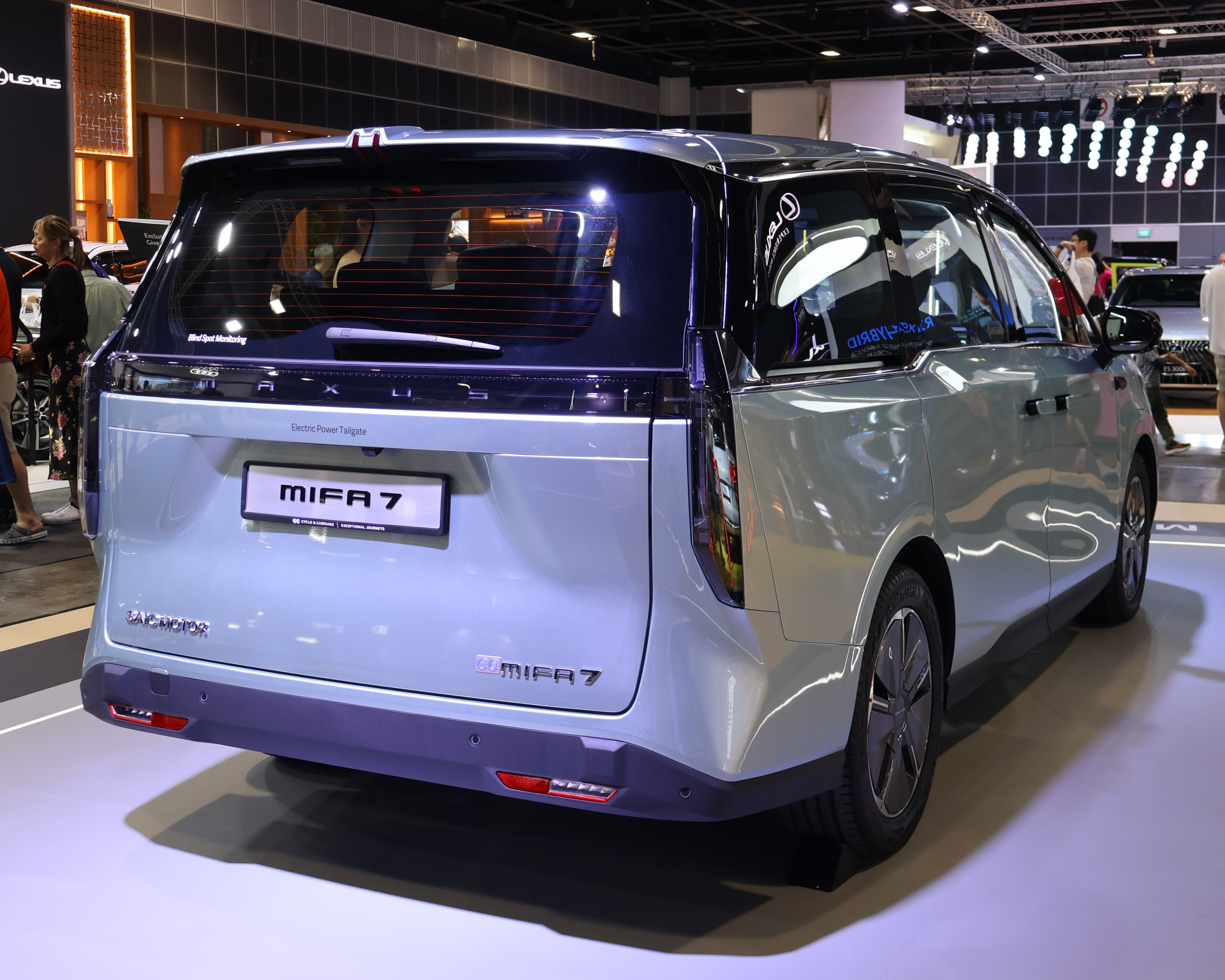
Rear view

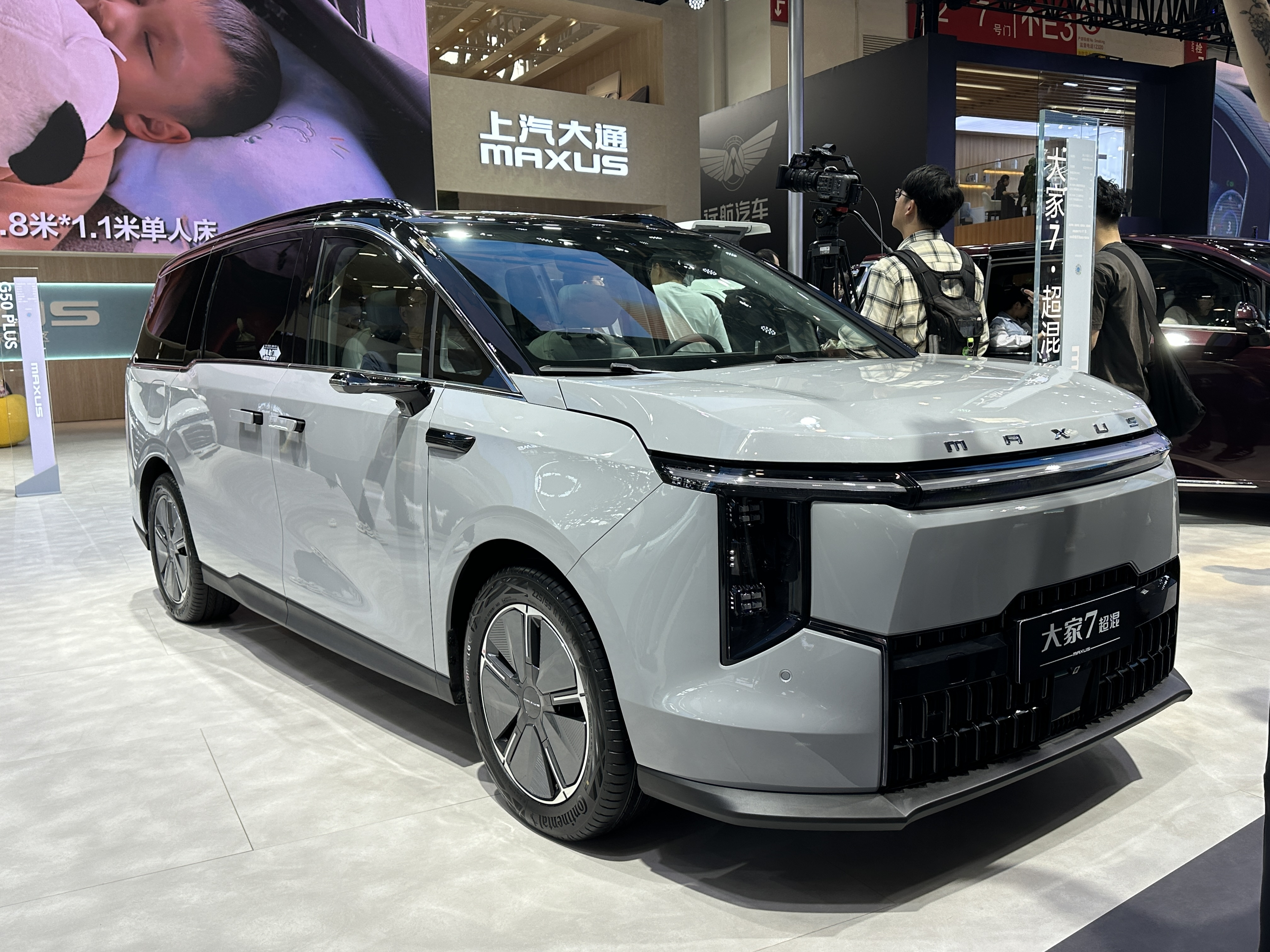
Maxus Mifa 7 (PHEV)

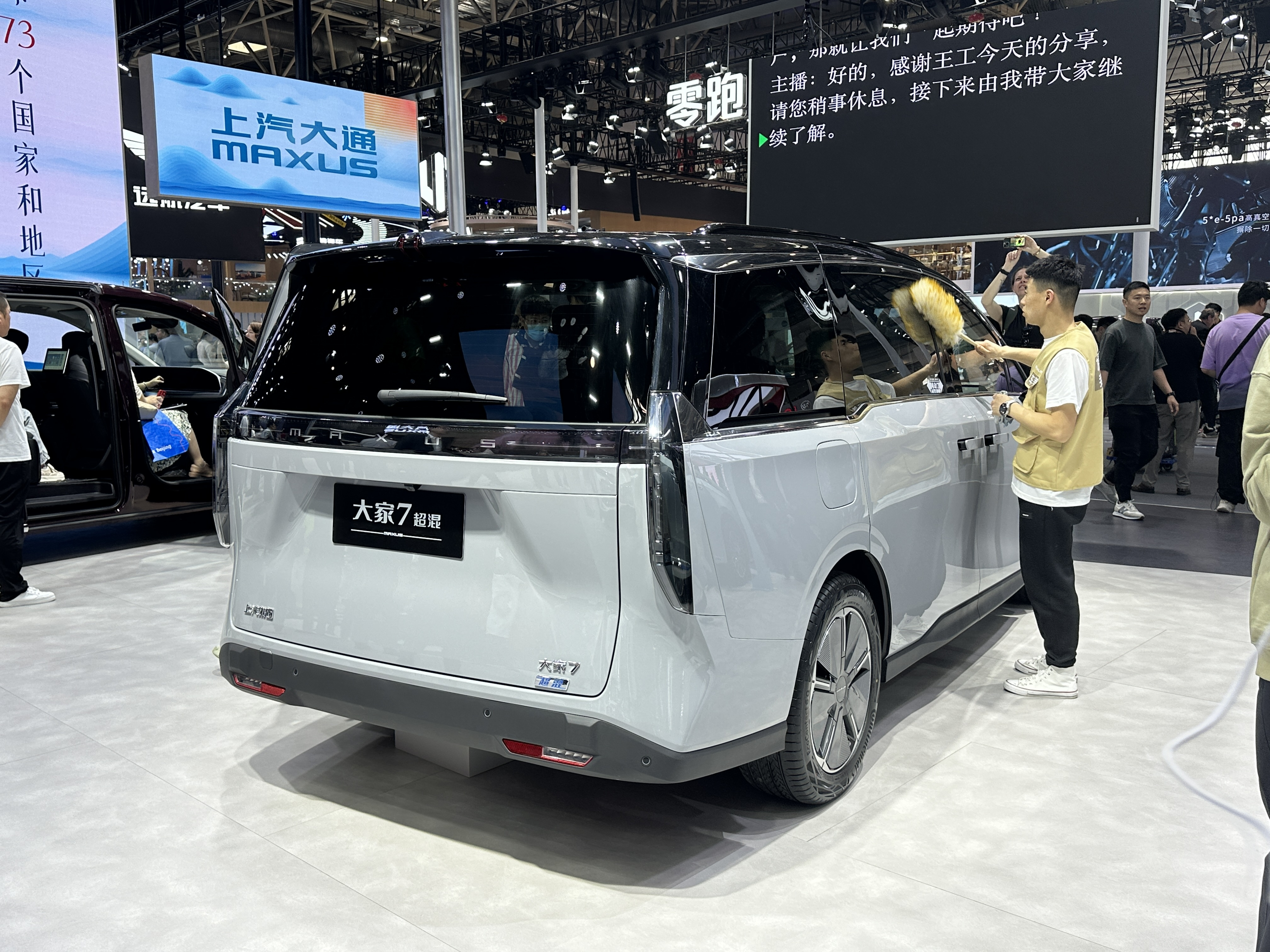
Rear view

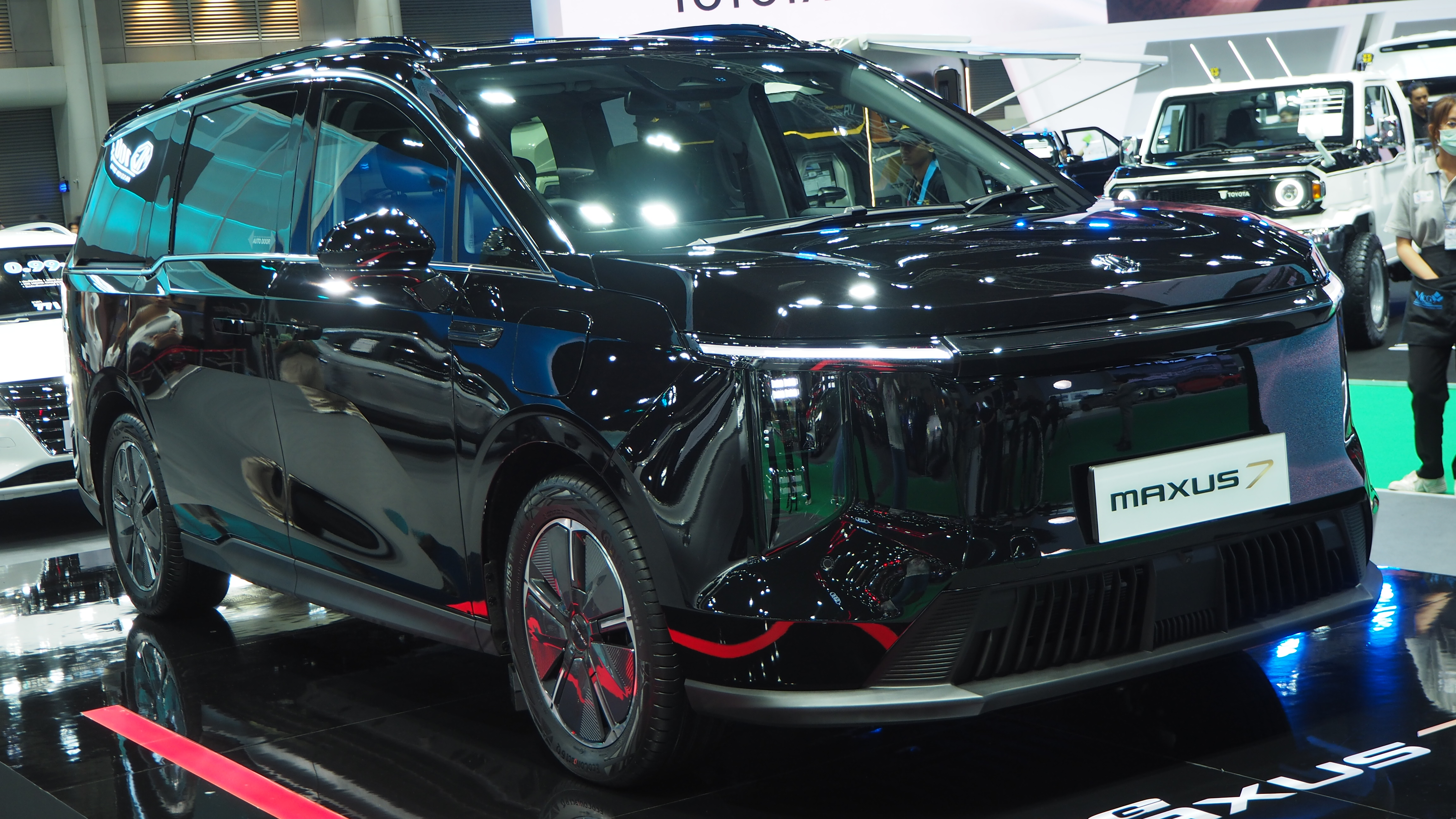
MG Maxus 7

== Safety ==
Euro NCAP test results Maxus Mifa 7 Premium (LHD) (2024)
Test	Points	%
Overall:	5 /5 stars	
Adult occupant:	36.8	92%
Child occupant:	42.8	87%
Pedestrian:	51.6	81%
Safety assist:	13.6	75%
