= List of MG vehicles =

The following is a list of cars marketed under the British MG marque. The marque was owned, and the cars produced, by Morris Garages (1924–1930), M.G. Car Company (1930–1952), British Motor Corporation (1952–1967), British Motor Holdings (1967–1968), British Leyland (1968–1992), Rover Group (1992–2000), MG Rover Group (2000–2006), Nanjing Automobile Group (2006–2011), and MG Motor, a division of SAIC Motor, since 2011.

== Current models ==
=== Original models ===
Image	Name(s)	Introduction (cal. year)	Generation	Description	Markets
Car
	MG2 EV	Upcoming	1st	Subcompact hatchback, BEV	Europe
	MG3	2008	3rd	Subcompact hatchback	Global (except India)
	MG4 EV	2022	2nd	Compact hatchback, BEV	Global (except India)
	MG5 / GT	2012	2nd	Compact saloon car (Note: A "saloon car" is also referred to as a "sedan" in some English dialects.)	Global (except Europe and India)
	MG6	2009	2nd	Mid-size saloon car	China
	MG7	2007	2nd	Mid-size saloon car	China, Middle East, Mexico and Vietnam
	07	2026	1st	Mid-size saloon car, BEV/PHEV	China
SUV
	4X	2026	1st	Compact SUV, BEV	China
	MGS5 EV	2024	1st	Compact SUV, BEV	Global (except India)
	MGS6 EV	2025	1st	Mid-size SUV, BEV	Global (except China and India)
	ZS / ZST / ZX	2017	1st	Subcompact crossover SUV	Global
	ZS / ZST / ZX	2017	2nd	Subcompact crossover SUV	Global (except China and India)
	ZS EV	2018	1st	BEV variant of the ZS.	Global
	HS	2018	1st	Compact SUV, ICE/PHEV	Global (except India)
	HS	2018	2nd	Compact SUV, ICE/PHEV	Global (except China and India)
	One	2021	1st	Compact SUV	Middle East and Mexico
Sports car
	Cyberster	2023	1st	Roadster, BEV	Global

=== Rebadged models outside China ===
MG widely adopts a rebadge strategy within SAIC Motor in markets outside of China, with models featuring different design languages being rebadged from IM Motors, Roewe, Wuling, Baojun, and Maxus.

For the original models, see List of SAIC vehicles

Model			Current generation		Rebadged from	Description
Image	Name(s)	Introduction (cal. year)	Introduction (cal. year)	Markets	Rebadged from	Description
Car
	Comet EV	2023	2023	India	Wuling Air EV	City car, BEV
	Binguo EV	2025	2025	Pakistan	Wuling Binguo	Subcompact hatchback, BEV
	Windsor EV	2024	2024	India	Baojun Yunduo	Compact hatchback, BEV
	MG5	2017	2018	Global emerging markets (LHD only)	Roewe i5	Compact saloon car
	MG5 EV / EP / ES	2020	2020	Thailand (as MG EP and MG ES)	Roewe Ei5	Compact estate car, (Note: An "estate car" is also referred to as a "station wagon" or "wagon" in some English dialects.) BEV
	MG8 PHEV	2025	2025	Middle East	Roewe D7	Mid-size saloon car, PHEV
	IM5	2025	2025	Global	IM L6	Mid-size saloon car, BEV
SUV
	Hector	2019	2019	India	Baojun 530	Compact SUV
	Hector Tomahawk	2026	2026	India	Wuling Starlight 560	Compact SUV, BEV/PHEV
	VS	2022	2022	Thailand and Indonesia	Roewe Lomemo	Compact SUV, PHEV
	Whale	2024	2024	Middle East	Roewe Jing	Compact coupé SUV
	RX5	2018	2018	Global emerging markets (LHD only)	Roewe RX5	Compact SUV
	RX8	2019	2019	Global emerging markets (LHD only)	Roewe RX8	Mid-size SUV
	RX9 / QS / MGS9 PHEV	2024	2024	Middle East, Australia, Europe	Roewe RX9	Mid-size SUV
	Gloster / Majestor / Rakan	2020	2020	India and Kuwait	Maxus D90	Mid-size SUV
	IM6	2025	2025	Global	IM LS6	Mid-size SUV, BEV
	IM8	Upcoming		Australia	IM LS8	Full-size SUV, EREV
MPV (Note: An "MPV" is also known in some dialects as a "minivan" or "people carrier".)
	G50 / G50 Plus	2024	2024	Philippines, Taiwan, Vietnam	Maxus G50	Compact MPV
	Maxus 7	2024	2024	Thailand	Maxus Mifa 7	Mid-size MPV, BEV/PHEV
	Maxus 9 / Mifa 9 / M9 EV	2023	2023	Southeast Asia	Maxus Mifa 9	Full-size MPV, BEV/PHEV
Pick-up
	Extender / T60 / TRQ	2019	2019	Southeast Asia, Pakistan and Middle East	Maxus T60 / T70	Mid-size pickup truck (Note: A "pickup truck" is also known as a "ute" or "bakkie" in some English dialects.)
	MGU9	2025	2025	Australia	Maxus Terron 9	Mid-size pickup truck

== Former models ==
=== Post SAIC Motor owned models ===
- 2021–2026 MG Marvel R
- 2019–2021 MG V80
- 2015–2019 MG GS
- 2017–2019 MG 360
- 2013–2014 MG 350
- 2012–2014 MG E50 / Dynamo EV
- 2009–2016 MG 750
- 2008–2014 MG 550
- 2007–2011 MG TF

=== Pre SAIC Motor owned Models ===
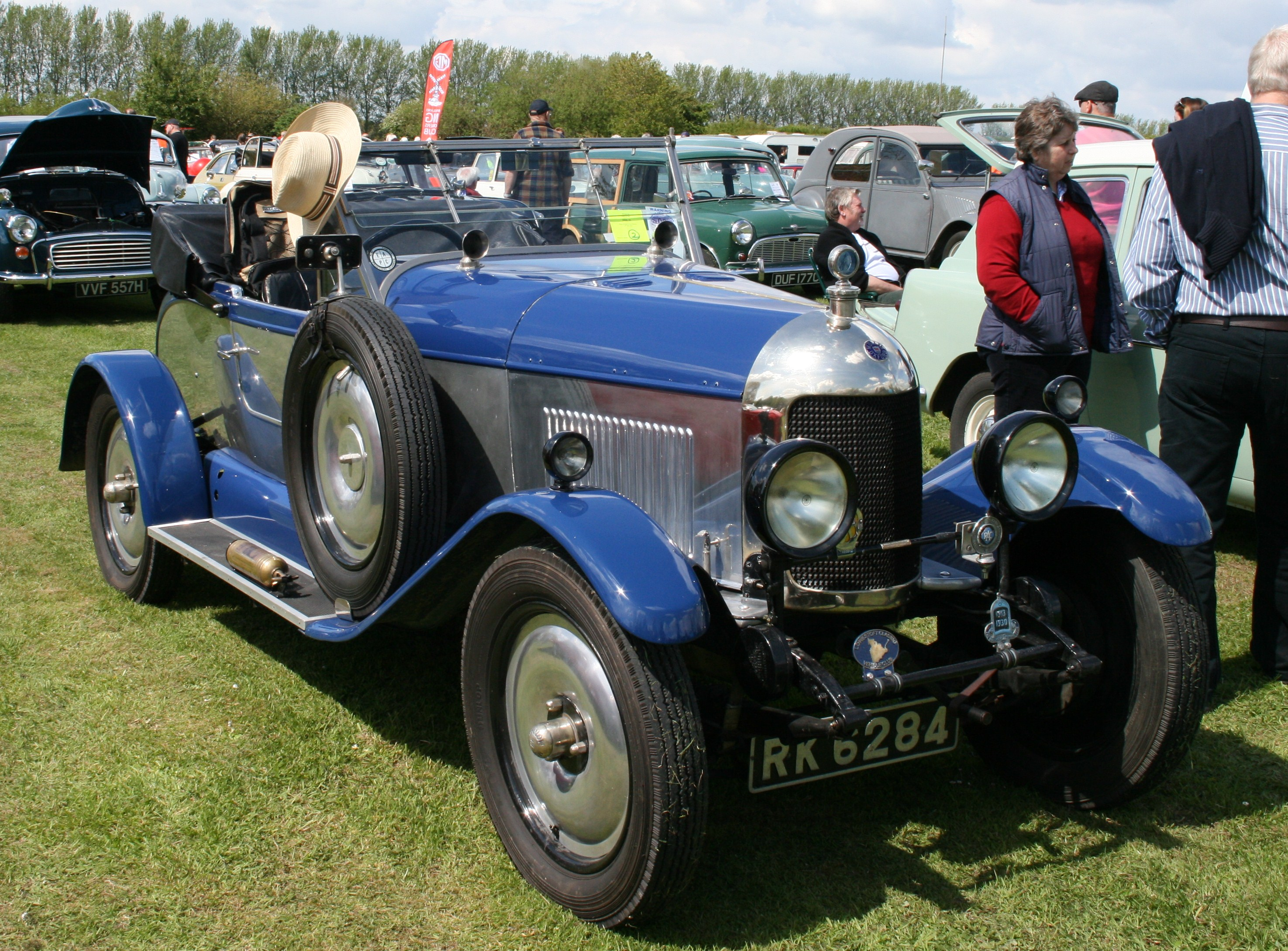
1926 14-28 open two-seater

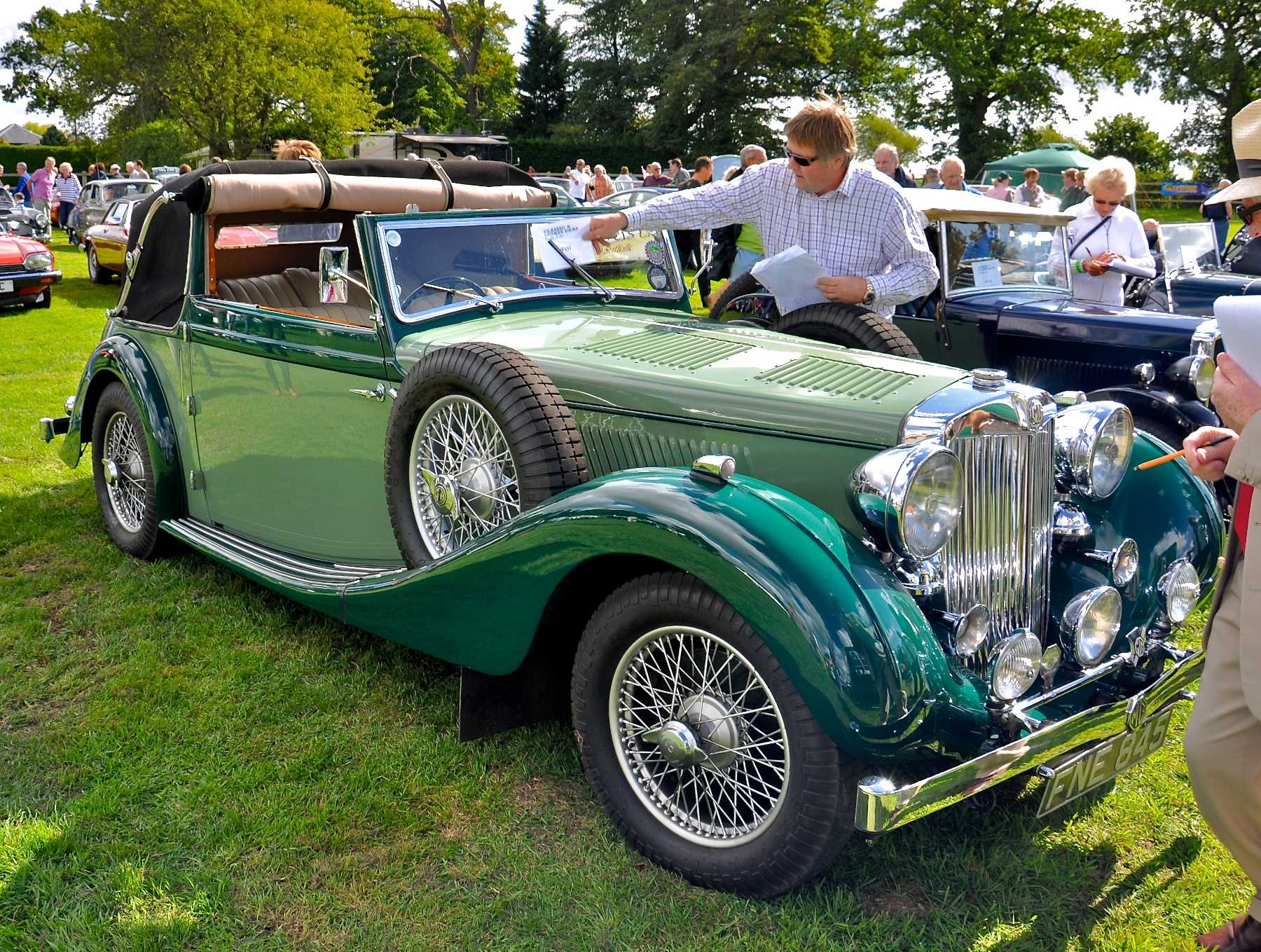
1939 WA drop head coupé by Tickford

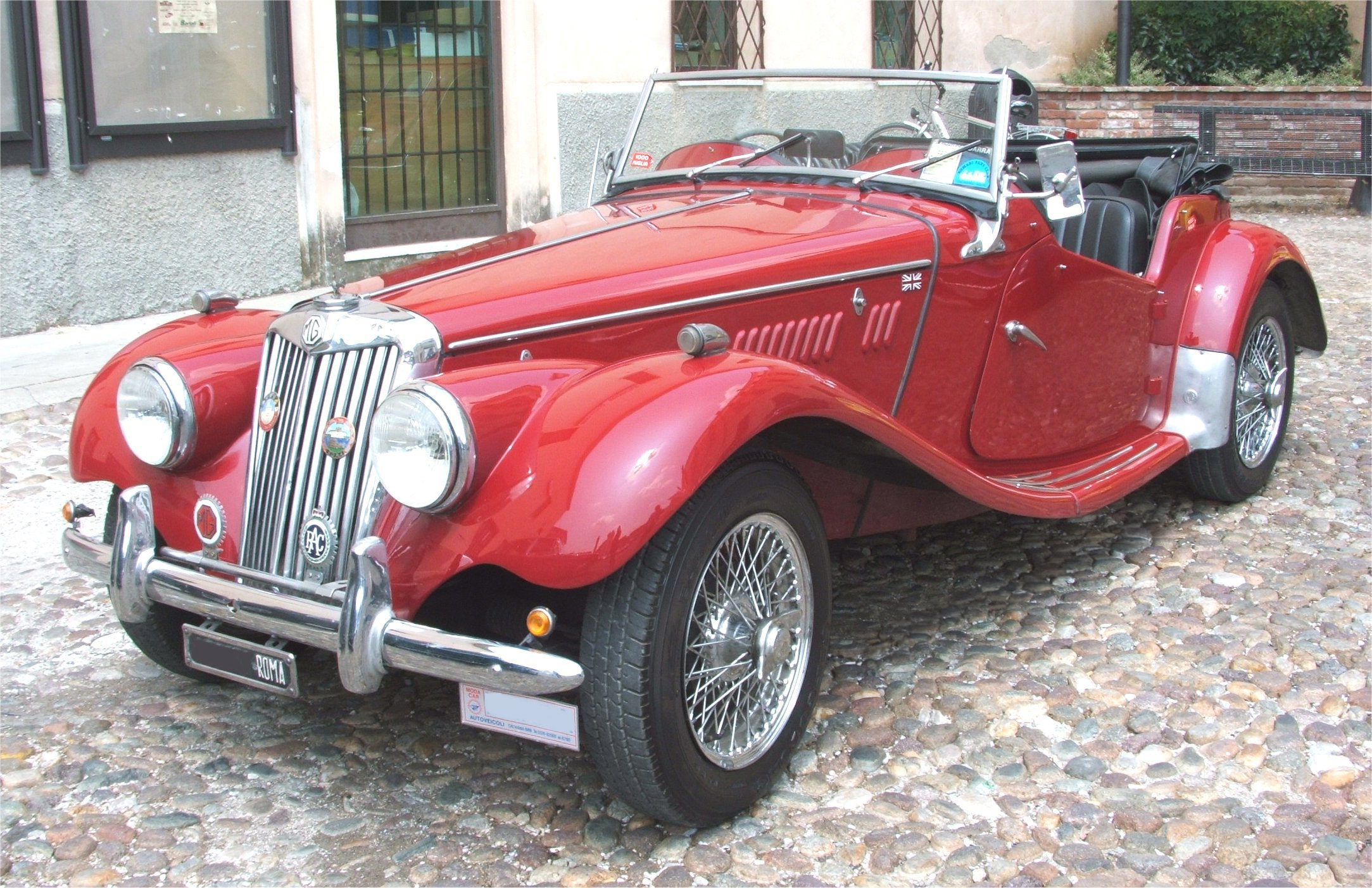
1954 TF, the last of the Midget series

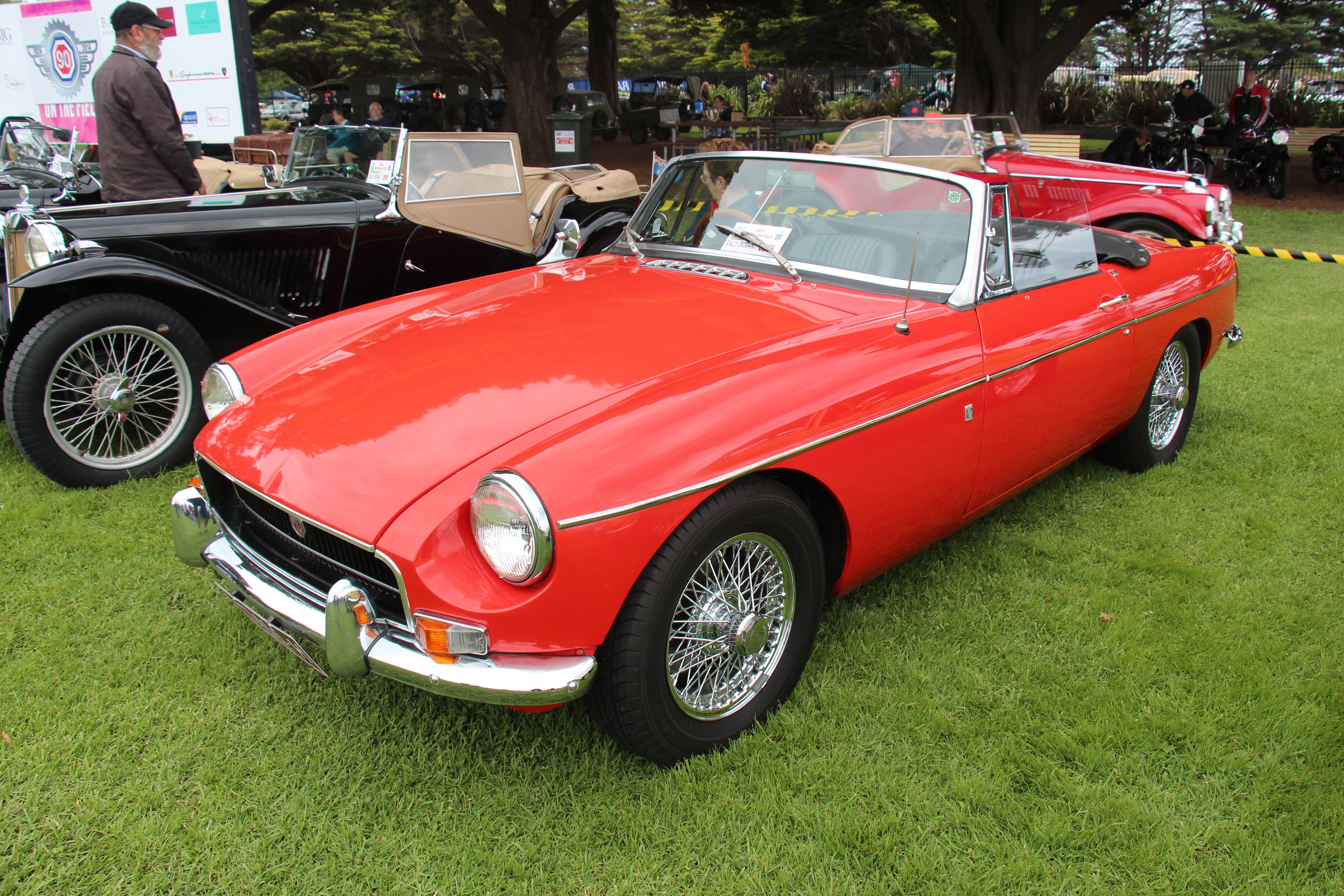
1970 MGB

==== Sports car ====
- 2002–2005 MG TF
- 1995–2002 MG F
- 1992–1995 MG RV8
- 1973–1976 MGB GT V8
- 1967–1969 MGC
- 1962–1980 MGB
- 1961–1979 MG Midget
- 1955–1962 MGA
- 1947–1953 MG Y type (saloon and) tourer
- 1936–1940 & 1945–1955 MG T-type Midget
- 1938–1939 MG WA saloon, tourer and drop-head coupé
- 1936–1939 MG VA saloon, tourer and drop-head coupé
- 1935–1939 MG SA saloon, tourer and drop-head coupé
- 1934–1936 MG P-type Midget
- 1934–1936 MG N-type Magnette
- 1933–1934 MG L-type Magna
- 1932–1934 MG K-type Magnette
- 1932–1934 MG J-type Midget
- 1931–1932 MG F-type Magna
- 1931–1932 MG D-type Midget
- 1931–1932 MG C-type Midget
- 1929–1932 MG M-type Midget
- 1928–1933 MG 18/80
- 1927–1929 MG 14/40
- 1924–1927 MG 14/28

==== Superminis ====
- 2001–2005 MG ZR
- 1982–1990 MG Metro

==== Small family cars ====
- 1967–1973 MG 1300
- 1962–1968 MG 1100
- 1933–1934 MG KN

==== Large family cars ====
- 2001–2005 MG ZT
- 2001–2005 MG ZS
- 1985–1991 MG Montego
- 1983–1991 MG Maestro
- 1961–1968 MG Magnette Mk. IV
- 1959–1961 MG Magnette Mk. III
- 1956–1958 MG Magnette ZB
- 1953–1956 MG Magnette ZA
- 1947–1953 MG Y-type
- 1937–1939 MG VA
- 1928–1933 MG 18/80
- 1927–1929 MG 14/40
- 1924–1927 MG 14/28
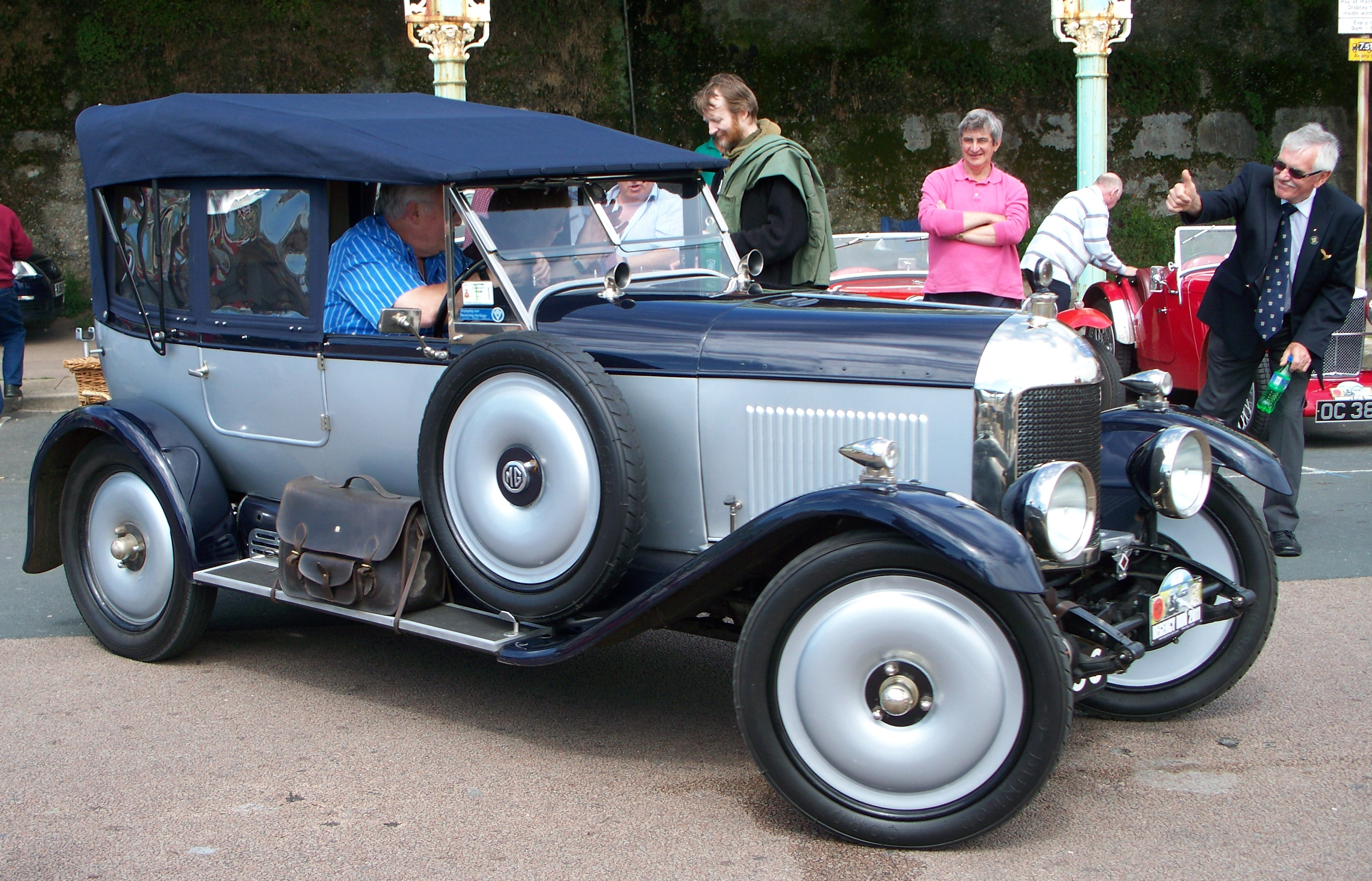
  1925 MG Morris Oxford 14-28

==== Executive cars ====
- 1938–1939 MG WA
- 1936–1939 MG SA

==== Supercars ====
- 2002–2005 MG XPower SV

==== Racing cars ====
- 2001 BTC-T MG ZS EX259
- 2001 MG-Lola EX257
- 1949-1954 Lester-MG T51
- 1935 MG R-type
- 1934 MG Q-type
- 1930–1931 MG 18/100 "Tigress"

==== Record-breaking cars ====
- 1959 EX219
- 1957 EX181 "Roaring Raindrop"
- 1954 EX179
- 1933 EX135
- 1931 EX127
- 1930 EX120

==== Vans ====
- 2003–2005 MG Express
- 1980–1998 MG Metro van

== Prototype vehicles ==
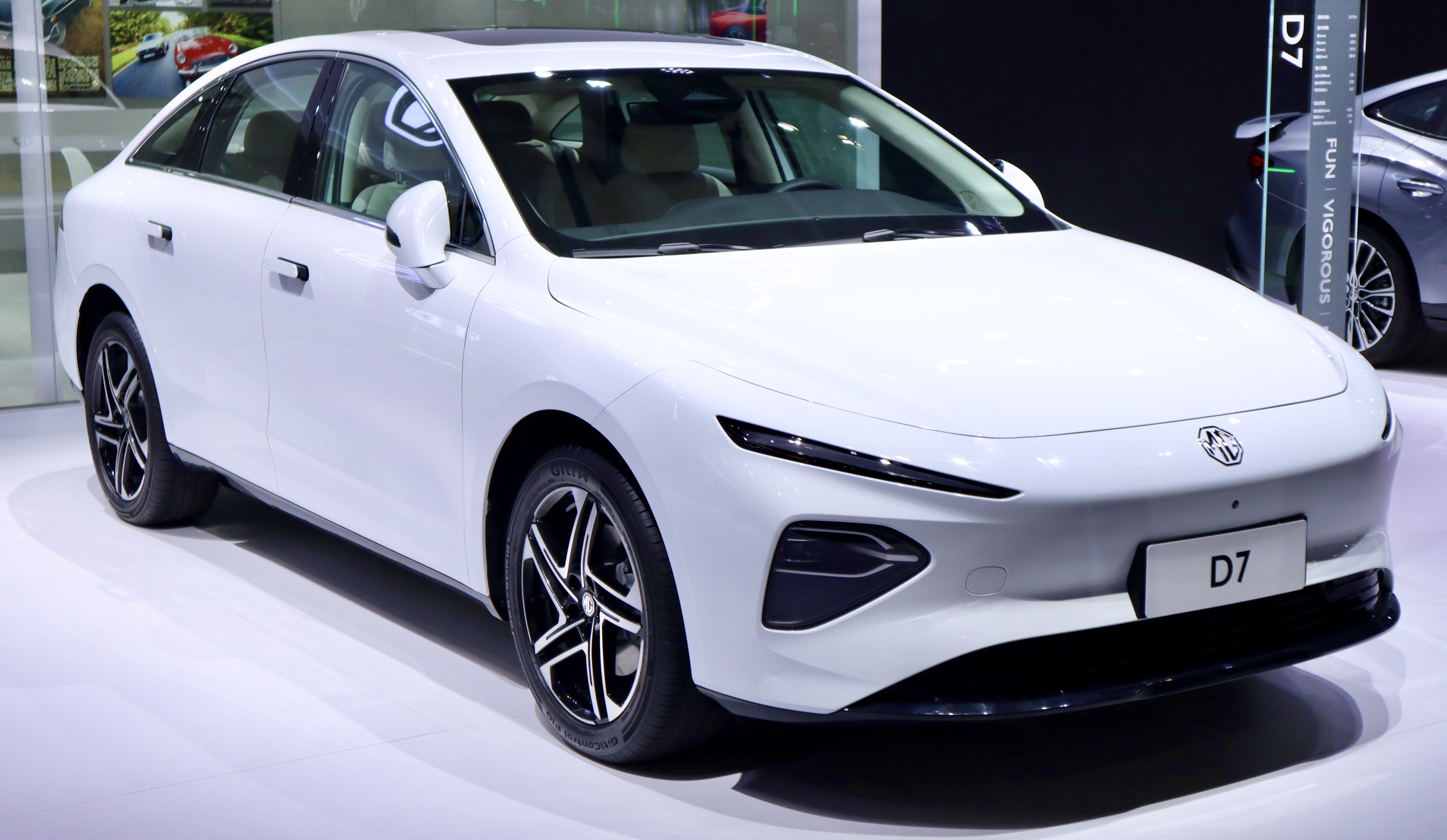
MG D7

- 2020 MG 360M — an MPV prototype based on the Baojun 360 unveiled at the 2020 Auto Expo in India.
- 2020 MG Marvel X — an electric SUV prototype based on the Roewe Marvel X unveiled at the 2020 Auto Expo in India.
- 2020 MG RC6 — a prototype saloon car based on the Baojun RC-6 unveiled at the 2020 Auto Expo in India.
- 2020 MG G10 — an MPV prototype based on the Maxus G10 unveiled at the 2020 Auto Expo in India.
- 2020 MG E200 — an electric city car prototype based on the Baojun E200.
- 2023 MG Mifa 9 — an electric MPV prototype previewing the MG Maxus 9.
- 2023 MG D7 — an electric saloon car prototype based on the Roewe D7
- 2024 MG9 EV — an electric saloon car prototype based on the SAIC Rising F7
- 2024 MG S9 EV/R7 — an electric crossover SUV prototype based on the SAIC Rising R7
- 2024 MG G90 — a MPV prototype based on the Maxus G90.

== Concept vehicles ==
MG Icon Concept Car

- 1983 MG Midget — a sports car concept, based on the AR6.
- 1985 MG EX-E — a sports car concept, based on the Metro 6R4.
- 2001 MG X80 — a sports car concept, based on the Qvale Mangusta. Cancelled because the styling was too conservative; replaced by the XPower SV.
- 2002 MG XPower SV — a sports car concept, based on the Qvale Mangusta. Production version of the X80.
- 2003 MG X120 — a trio of sports car concepts: a new Midget, a TF replacement and a new coupé. Cancelled in 2005 when MG Rover went bankrupt.
- 2004 MG GT Concept — a coupé concept based on the TF. Never entered production due to the collapse of MG Rover.
- 2009 MG 6 — a fastback/GT concept unveiled at the 2009 Shanghai Auto Show, previewed the MG6.
- 2010 MG Zero — a supermini concept, unveiled at the 2010 Beijing Auto Show, previewed the second-generation MG3.
- 2011 MG Concept 5 a hatchback concept unveiled at the 2011 Shanghai Auto Show, previewed the MG5.
- 2012 MG Icon — an SUV concept inspired by the MGB GT, unveiled at the Beijing Auto Show in 2012.
- 2013 MG CS — an SUV concept that was unveiled at the Shanghai Motor Show in 2013.
- 2014 MG EV — an electric supermini based on the Roewe E50, unveiled in 2014.
- 2017 MG E-Motion — an electric sports car concept unveiled at the Shanghai Motor Show in 2017.
- 2018 MG X-Motion — an SUV concept unveiled at the Beijing Motor Show 2018, previewed the MG HS.
- 2021 MG Cyberster — an electric sports car concept previewing the MG Cyberster roadster.
- 2024 MG EXE181 — an electric supercar inspired by the 1959 MG EX181 land speed record car, unveiled at the 2024 Beijing Motor Show.
- 2024 MG Cyber GTS – a 2+2 coupé version of the Cyberster
- 2025 MG Cyber X — a boxy SUV concept with pop-up headlights unveiled at the Shanghai Motor Show 2025
- 2026 MG Cyber — an all-electric SUV concept unveiled at the Goodwood Festival of Speed on 9 July 2026.
