= T51 =

T51 may refer to:

== Aviation ==
- Cessna T-51, used by the United States Air Force Academy Flying Team
- Continental T51, a turboshaft engine
- Dan Jones International Airport, in Harris County, Texas, United States
- Slingsby T.51 Dart, a British glider
- Titan T-51 Mustang, a three-quarter size replica of the P-51 Mustang

== Automobiles ==
- Bugatti T51, a French racing car
- Cooper T51, a British Formula One and Formula Two racing car
- Jiabao T51, a Chinese microvan
- Lester-MG T51, a British sports race car

== Other uses ==
- T51 (classification), a wheelchair racing class
- T.51/ISO/IEC 6937, an ITU standard defining a multi-byte character set
