= Hubert Charles =

Hubert Charles may refer to:

- Hubert Charles (lawyer) (1925–2017), French-Mogegasque lawyer and judge
- Hubert J. Charles (born 1948), Dominican diplomat and educator
- Hubert N. Charles (1893–1982), English automotive engineer
