= MG 18/80 =

British sports car

1931 MG 18/80 Mark I Speed

The MG 18/80 is a car that MG Cars made from 1928 to 1931 as a successor to the types 14/28 and 14/40.

== Description ==
1930 Mark II saloon

While its predecessors were very closely based on the Morris Oxford bullnose, the MG 18/80 was the first model in which the factory had designed the chassis itself, and was the first car to have the typical MG grille with vertical standing slats and vertical center bar and higher set headlights. It was initially known as the 'MG Six'.

The MG 18/80 uses a tuned version of the Morris Light Six engine, with a stronger chassis.

The Mark I and Mark II were offered in various body styles: two- and four-door, two- and four-seater and both closed and touring cars. The Mark I was built from 1928 to 1931, to a total of 501 examples. From 1929 onwards, the Mark II was offered in parallel, with 236 built.

Engine of 1929 Mark I tourer

All models have a six-cylinder inline engine with chain-driven single overhead camshaft. They displace 2,468 cc, and have twin SU carburettors sharing one float chamber. In both the Mark I and Mark II, the power is about 60 bhp (45 kW), giving a top speed of 80 mph (130 km/h), as indicated by the "80" in the product designation 18/80.

== Mark III ==
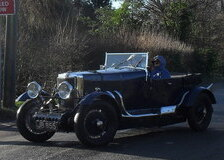
An 18/100 (Tigress) outside Elsted railway station.

The Mark III was referred to variously as "18/80 Tigress" and the "18/100", and was a racing version launched in 1930. Only five vehicles were produced. This version has an engine with the same displacement, but with dry sump lubrication, rated at 80 hp (60 kW).

There was no direct successor. Only in 1936 did MG launch the SA, its next large-engined model.

== Bibliography ==
- Culshaw, David; Horrobin, Peter (1997). The Complete Catalogue of British Cars 1895–1975. Dorchester: Veloce Publishing. ISBN 1-87410-593-6.
