= Roewe D7 =

Mid-size sedan

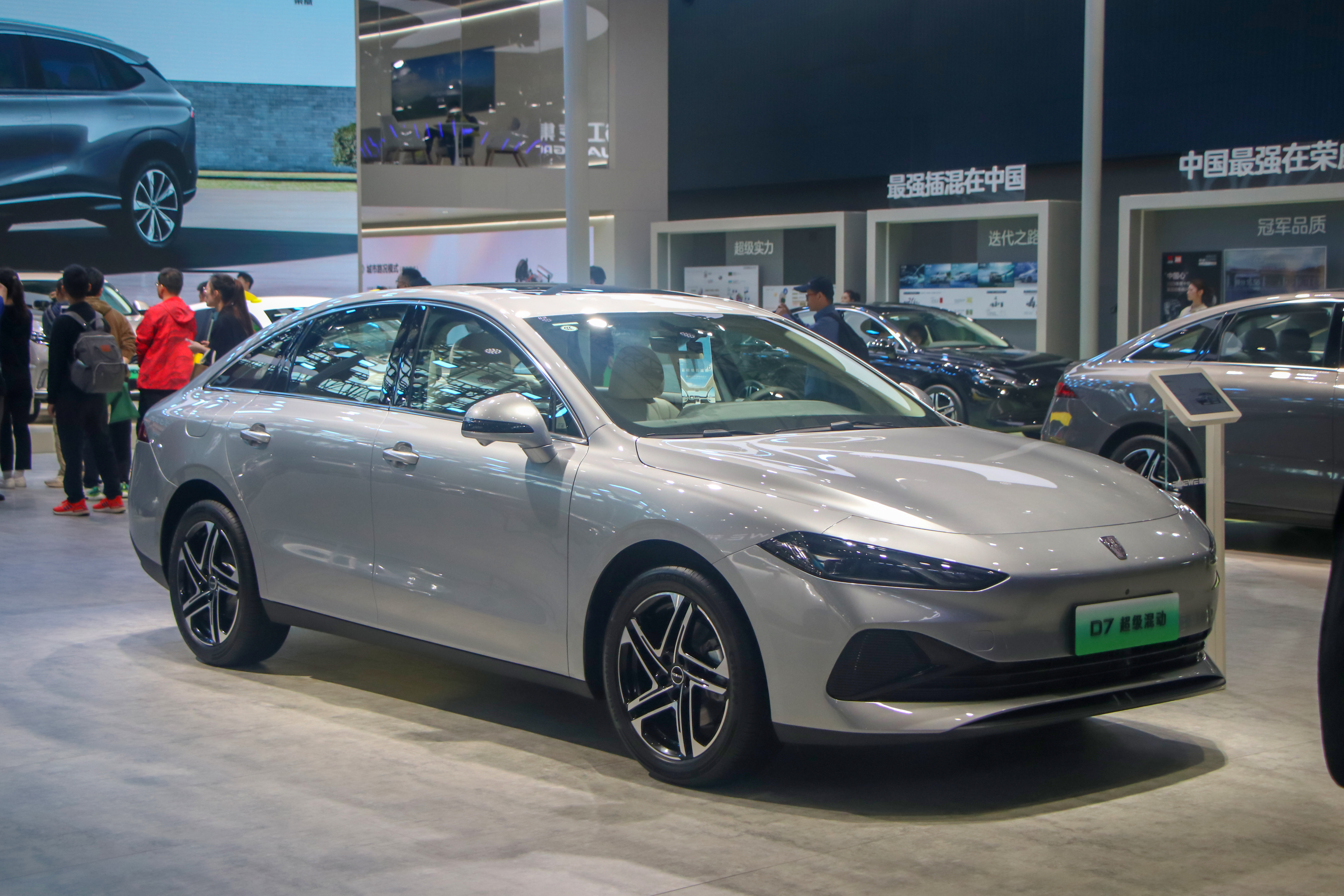

Overview
- Manufacturer: Roewe (SAIC Motor)
- Model code: EP39
- Also called: MG D7; MG8 PHEV (Middle East)
- Production: 2023–present
- Assembly: China: Pukou, Nanjing

Body and chassis
- Class: Mid-size car (D)
- Body style: 4-door saloon
- Layout: Rear-motor, rear-wheel-drive (EV); Front-engine, front-motor, front-wheel-drive (PHEV)
- Platform: Modular Scalable Platform / Nebula (SAIC E3)

Powertrain
- Engine: 1.5 L 15S4C I4
- Electric motor: Permanent magnet synchronous
- Power output: 194–207 hp (145–154 kW; 197–210 PS) (EV); 293–311 hp (218–232 kW; 297–315 PS) (PHEV)
- Hybrid drivetrain: Plug-in hybrid (D7 DHM)
- Battery: 19.7 kWh LFP; 21.4 kWh LFP; 59.2 kWh LFP; 68.5 kWh NMC
- Range: 1,400 km (870 mi) (PHEV)
- Electric range: 510–610 km (317–379 mi) (EV); 125 km (78 mi) (PHEV)

Dimensions
- Wheelbase: 2,810 mm (110.6 in)
- Length: 4,890 mm (192.5 in)
- Width: 1,872–1,890 mm (73.7–74.4 in)
- Height: 1,510 mm (59.4 in)
- Curb weight: 1,717 kg (3,785 lb)

Chronology
- Predecessor: Roewe 950

The Roewe D7 is a battery electric and plug-in hybrid mid-size sedan produced by SAIC Motor under the Roewe brand.

== Overview ==
In August 2023, Roewe launched the D7, debuted in two drive variants the EV and PHEV, differing in the styling of the front fascia.

The electric variant also gained distinctive visual features: double-row headlights and a pointed bumper, resembling the styling language of NIO.

Both variants use the same minimalist design of the passenger cabin with the white materials and two 12.3-inch screens forming digital clocks and a multimedia system. Adaptive cruise control, a panoramic glass roof and single-zone air conditioning are also standard. Under the hood, the electric variant gained a small frunk.

== Powertrain ==
=== EV ===
The 510 km range EV version of the D7 develops 197 PS (145 kW; 194 hp), powered by the battery supplied by CLTC. The 610 km range version delivers the power of 211 PS (155 kW; 208 hp).

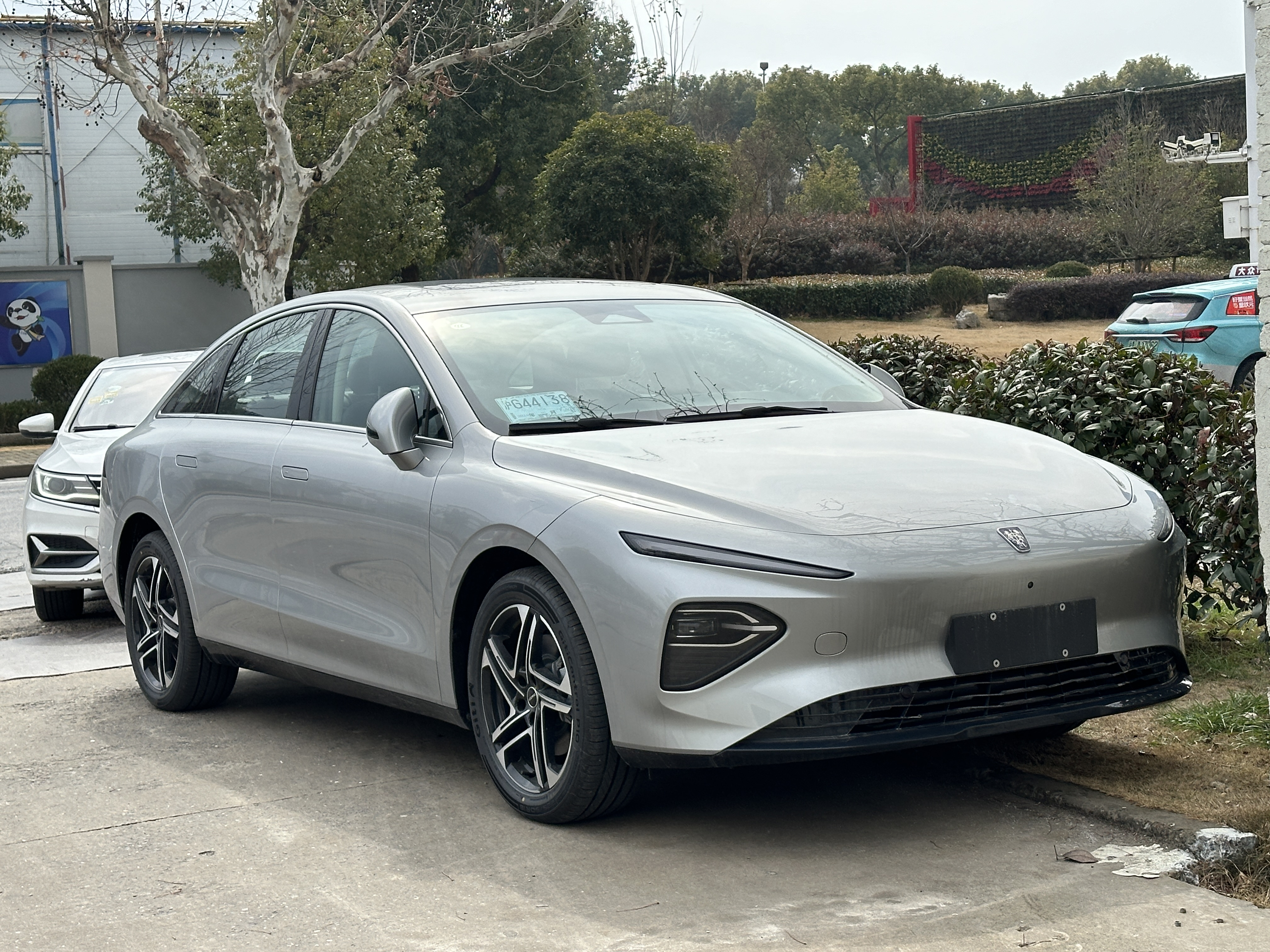
Roewe D7 EV

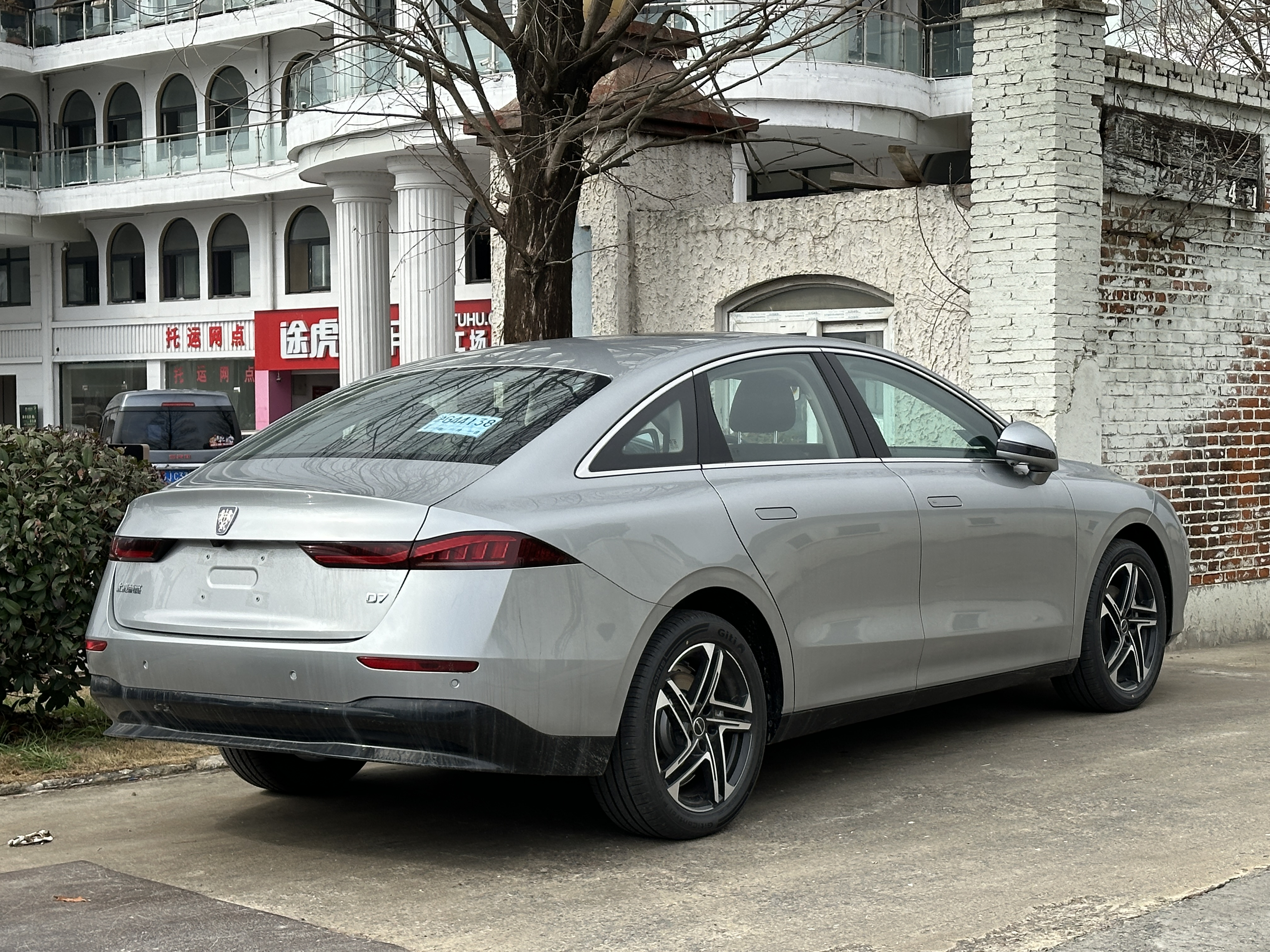
Rear view

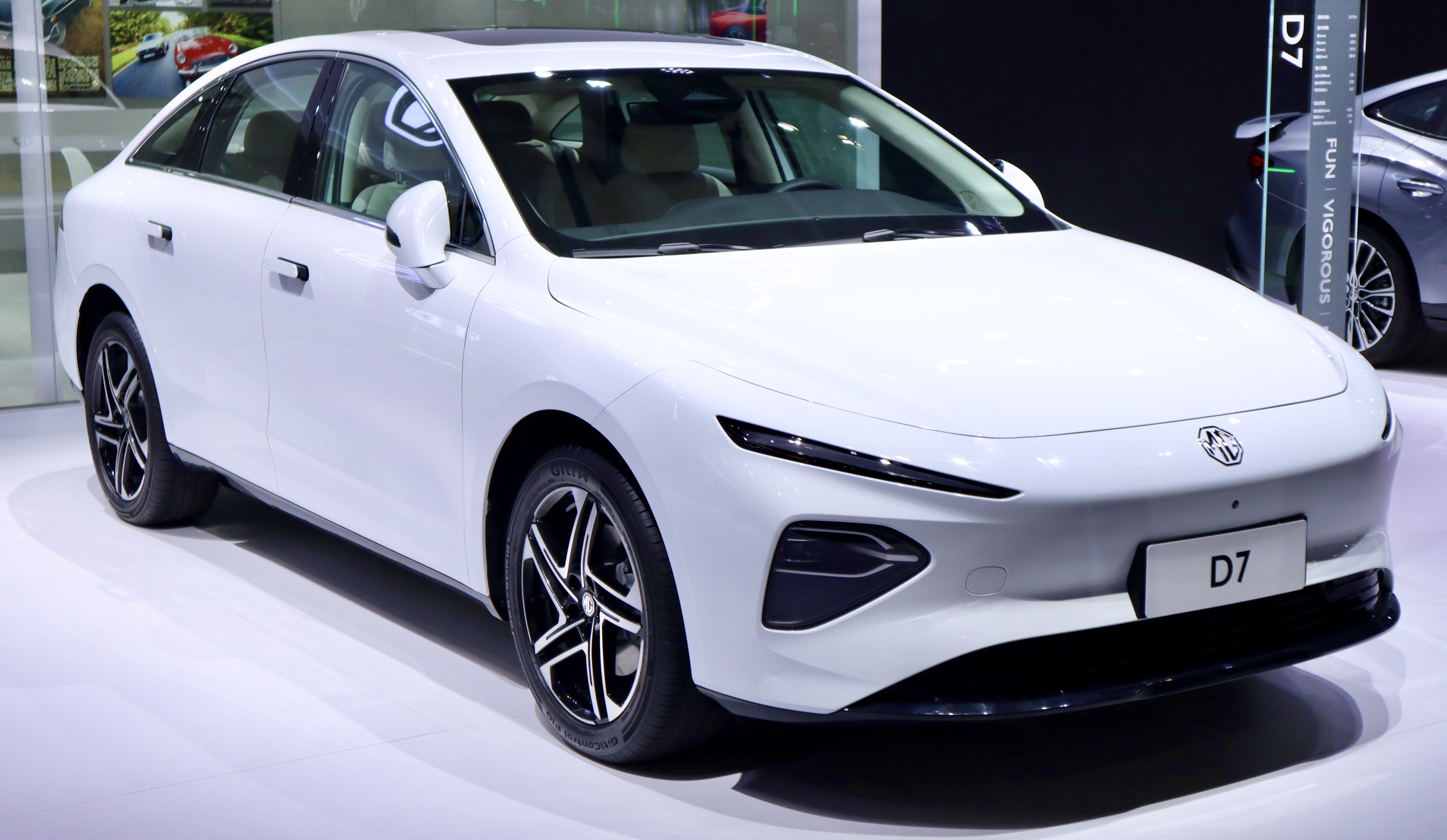
MG D7

=== DMH ===
The PHEV variant received an additional "DMH" part in its name and a different front fascia design. It use integrated, single and larger headlight lenses with a teardrop, soaring shape. The combustion engine is combined with two electric motors, offering 125 kilometers of range in electric mode and up to 1,400 kilometers of range in mixed mode. The 1.5-liter petrol engine delivers 112 PS (82 kW; 110 hp) and the motor in the rear axle delivers the power of 204 PS (150 kW; 201 hp) for a combined output of 315 PS (232 kW; 311 hp) with a 21.4 kWh LFP battery. Since 2024, the motor was changed to a 186 PS (137 kW; 183 hp) unit for a combined power output of 297 PS (218 kW; 293 hp) and a 19.7 kWh battery.

The D7 was launched in the Middle East countries as the MG8 PHEV on September 8, 2025. The model is offered in two trim levels: STD and COM, both powered by a 1.5-liter plug-in hybrid engine delivering 201 hp (150 kW; 204 PS) and 330 N⋅m (243 lb⋅ft) torque.

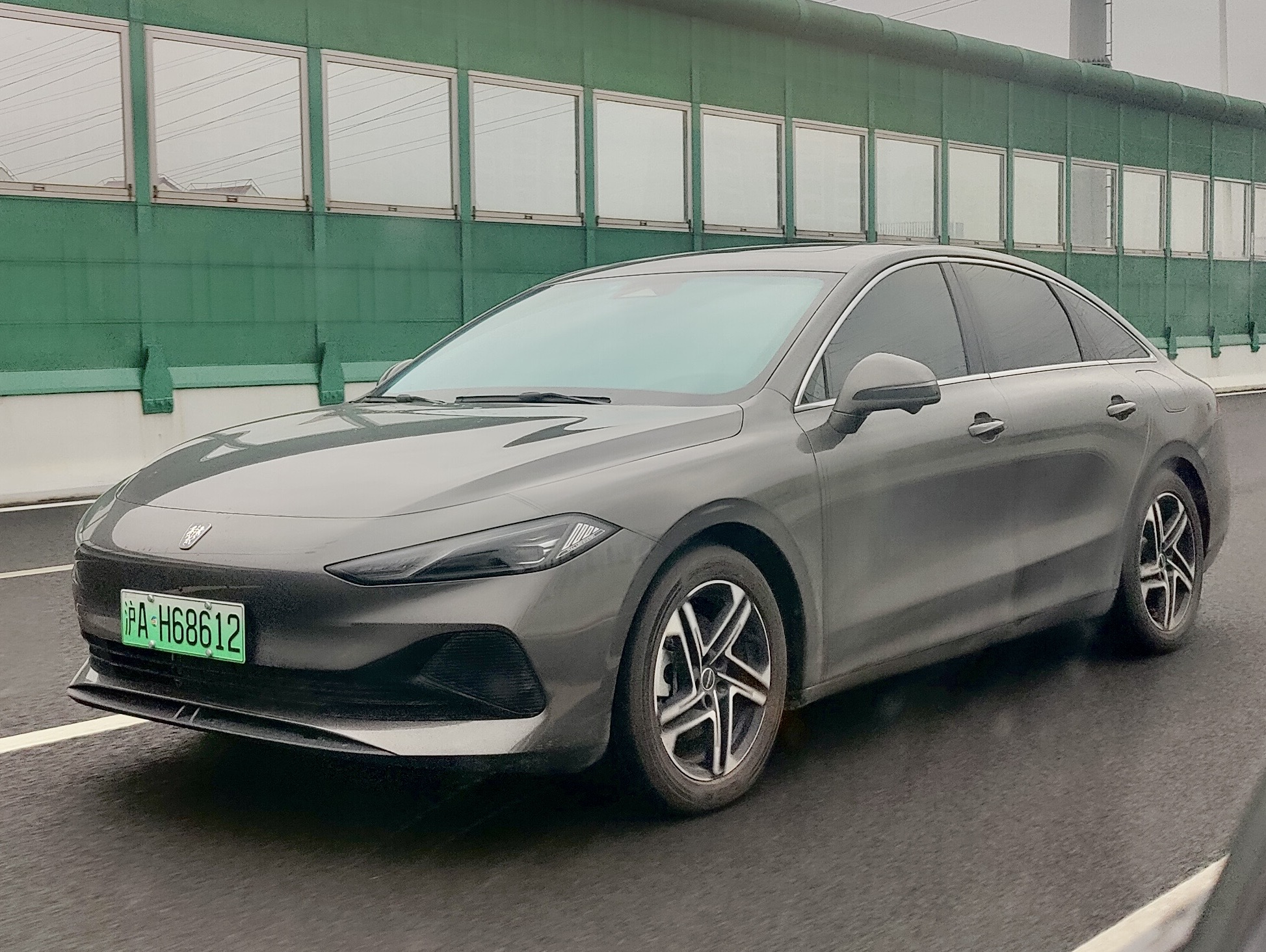
Roewe D7 DMH

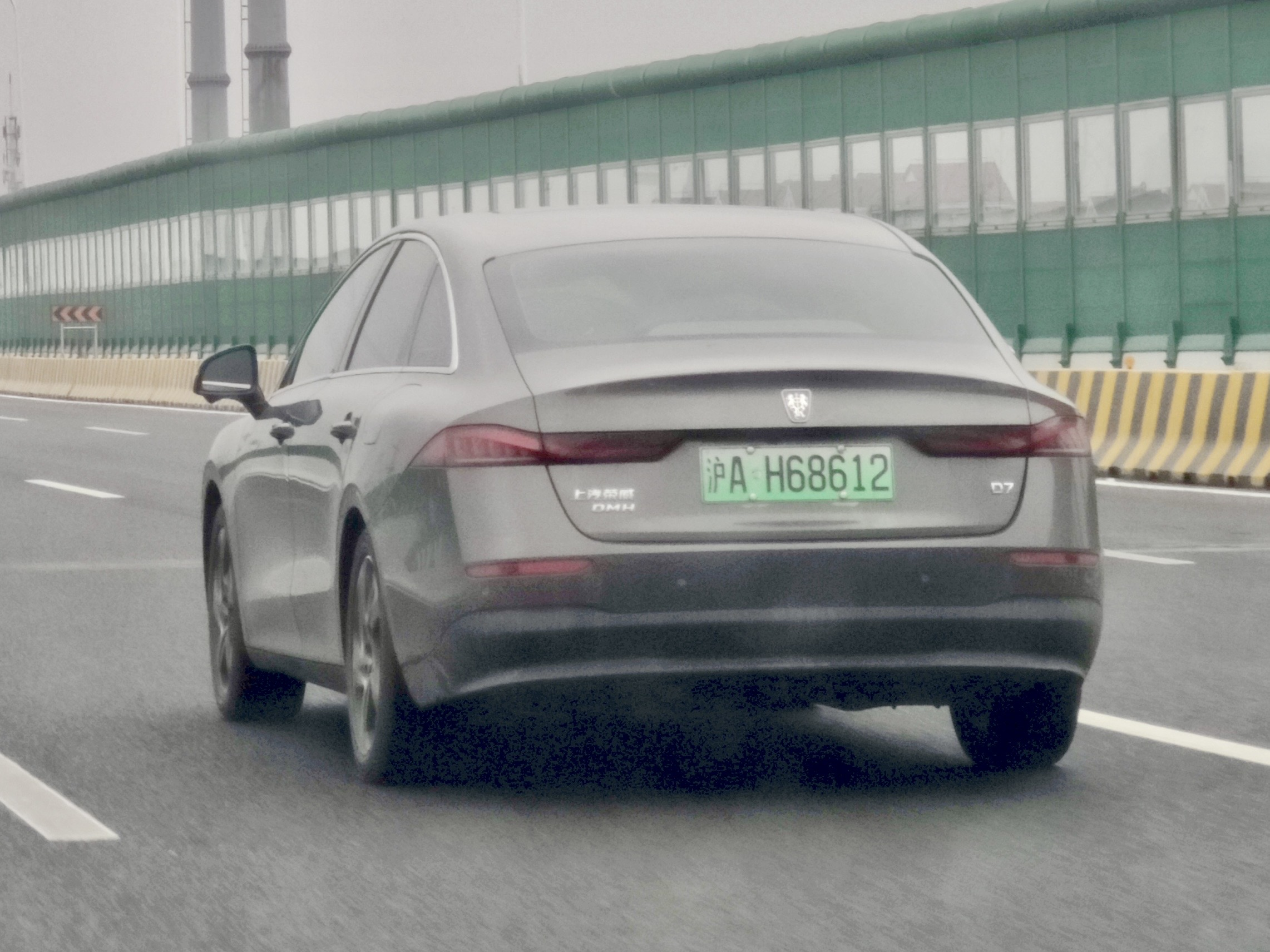
Rear view

== Roewe M7 ==
Roewe M7
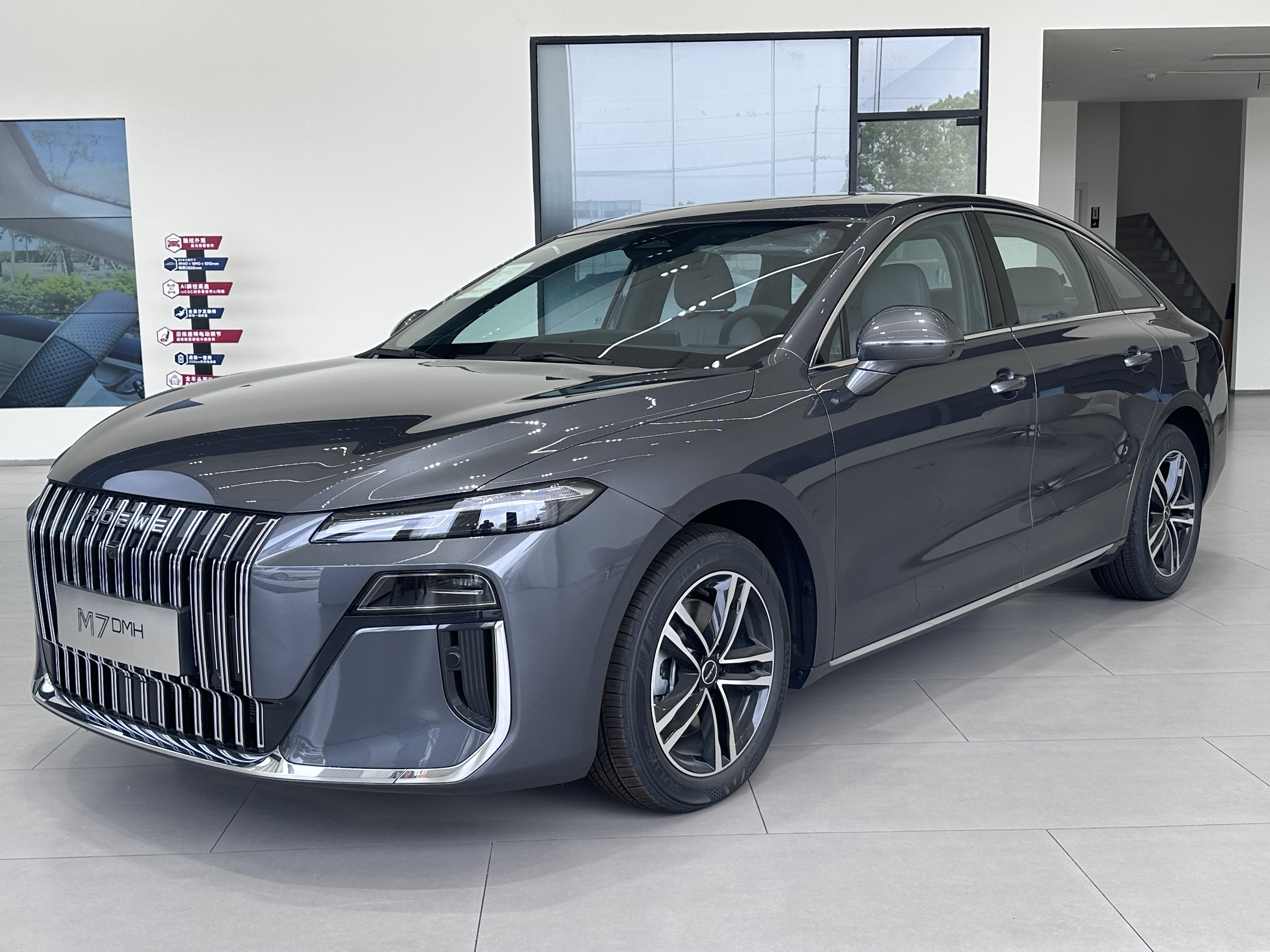

Overview
- Production: 2025–present
- Model years: 2026–present
- Assembly: China: Pukou, Nanjing
- Designer: Jozef Kabaň

Body and chassis
- Platform: Modular Scalable Platform / Nebula (SAIC E3)

Dimensions
- Wheelbase: 2,820 mm (111.0 in)
- Length: 4,940 mm (194.5 in)
- Width: 1,872–1,890 mm (73.7–74.4 in)
- Height: 1,510 mm (59.4 in)
- Curb weight: 1,670 kg (3,682 lb)

The Roewe M7 is upgraded version of the D7.

Less than two years after the D7 premiere, a heavily modified, larger, and more expensive version debuted under the name M7. It was also the first production car designed under the supervision of former Volkswagen Group designer Jozef Kabań, with a characteristic, massive front fascia decorated with narrow, soaring headlights and a large, chrome radiator grille with a large "ROEWE" lettering instead of the traditional logotype. Visual changes compared to the D7 also covered the rear, where the license plate was moved to the bumper and the lamps were connected by a light strip.

The M7 passenger compartment also borrows the existing design from the D7, adding a larger 15.6-inch central touchscreen that extends beyond the cockpit. A larger 10.25-inch digital instrument panel sits in front of the driver, and the center tunnel has a redesigned layout.

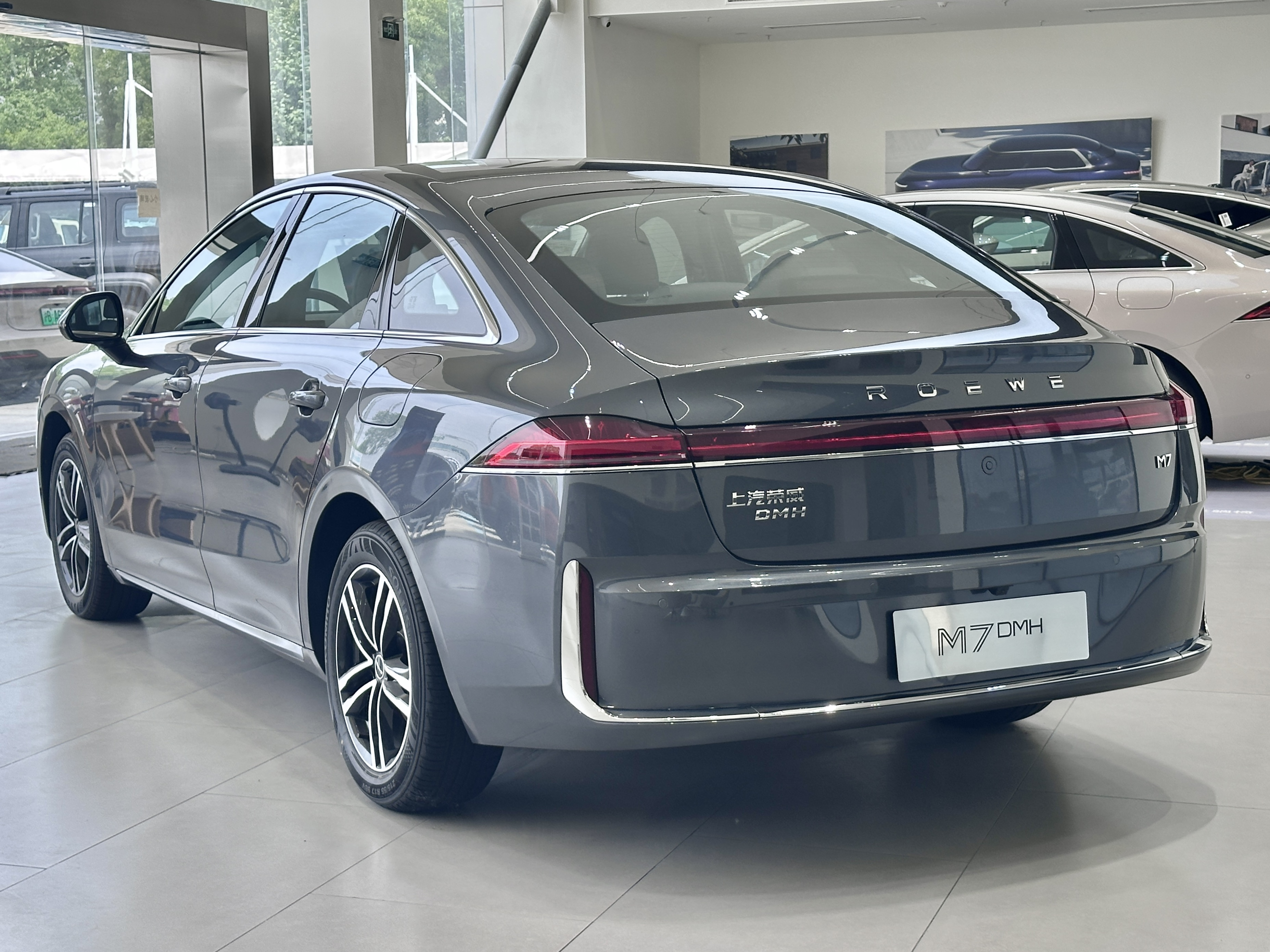
Rear view

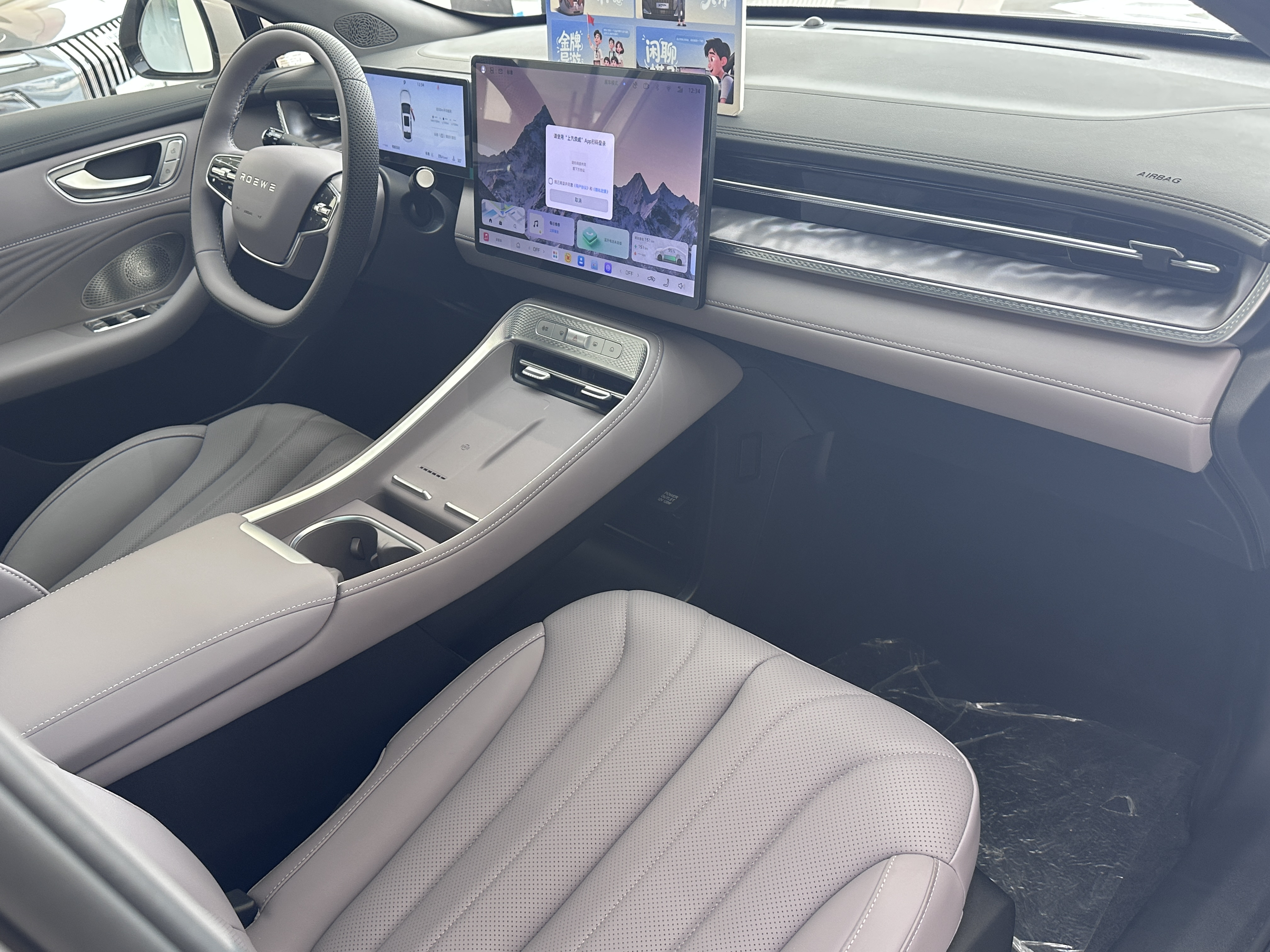
Interior

== Powertrain ==
The M7 is equipped with SAIC's next-generation DMH plug-in hybrid petrol-electric powertrain. It features a 1.5-liter, 110-horsepower petrol engine and a 184-horsepower electric motor. Thanks to a 19.7-kWh battery, the car offers an all-electric range of up to 160 kilometers, and a combined range of up to 2,050 kilometers.

== Sales ==
Year	China		
Year	D7 EV	D7 DMH	M7 DMH
2023	1,400	4,820	—
2024	12,851	20,390	—
2025	3,880	19,448	10,589
