= Roewe E50 =

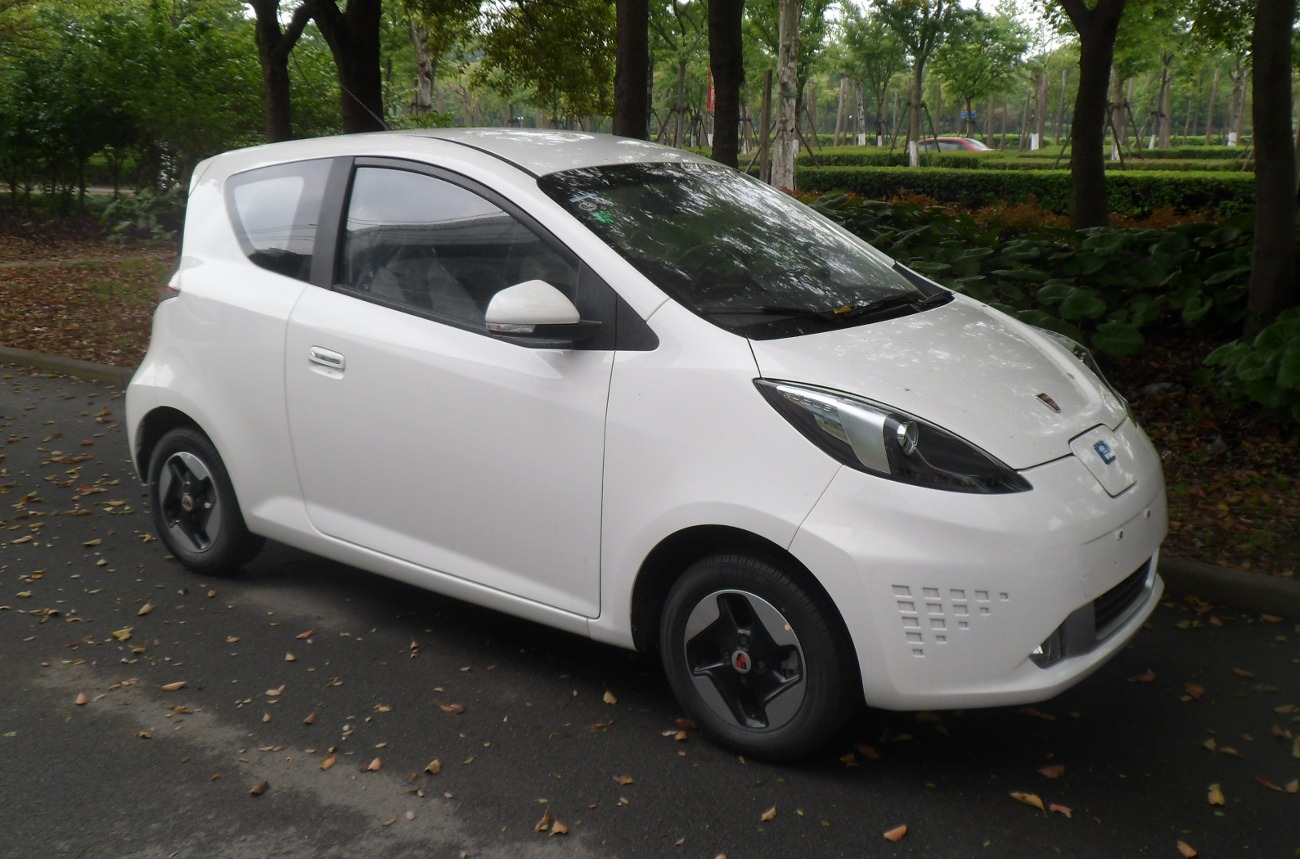

Overview
- Manufacturer: Roewe (SAIC Motor)
- Also called: MG Dynamo EV (2014); MG E50 (2012)
- Production: 2012–2016
- Assembly: China: Pukou, Nanjing

Body and chassis
- Class: All-Electric Supermini
- Body style: 3-door hatchback
- Layout: Front Motor, FWD

Powertrain
- Electric motor: 47 kW Permanent-Magnet Synchronous
- Transmission: Single-speed Automatic
- Battery: 18 kWh LiFePo4 (Lithium iron phosphate)

Dimensions
- Wheelbase: 2,305 mm (90.7 in)
- Length: 3,569 mm (140.5 in)
- Width: 1,551 mm (61.1 in)
- Height: 1,540 mm (60.6 in)
- Kerb weight: 1,080 kg (2,381 lb)

Chronology
- Successor: Roewe Clever

The Roewe E50 is an all-electric car that is manufactured by the Chinese manufacturer Roewe.

== Overview ==
The E50 was originally unveiled as the E1 concept car at the 2012 Beijing International Automotive Exhibition. In November 2012, SAIC Motor introduced the production version of the Roewe E50, a four-seater supermini sized hatchback for the market in China.

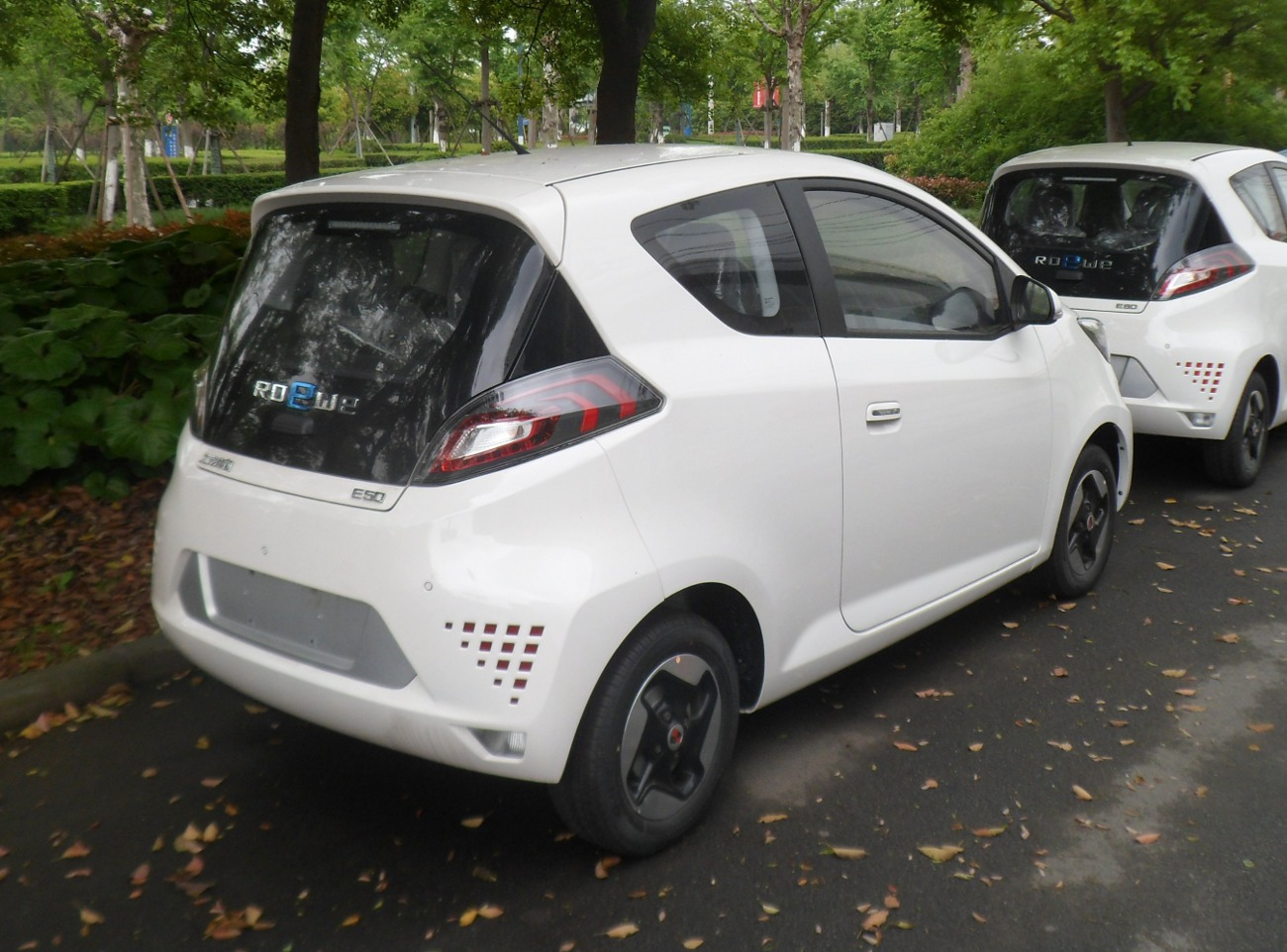
Roewe E50 (rear)

The E50 has a 47 kW motor and an 18 kWh battery pack supplied by A123 Systems that delivers a range of 180 km (110 mi) and a top speed of up to 120 km/h (75 mph). The E50 uses several lightweight materials from Evonik to reduce energy consumption and to achieve lower emissions.

In 2012, the electric car pricing started at CN¥234,900 (US$37,589) before available government incentives, and SAIC's goal was to sell 1,000 units within the first year in the market. Retail deliveries began in Shanghai in January 2013.

The E50 is subject to a cash rebate of CN¥60,000 (US$9,648) from the central government, another CN¥40,000 (US$6,432) from the Shanghai municipal government, and also is exempted from the city's license plate fee, which by January 2013 had a cost of CN¥75,000 (US$12,060), but the new energy car plates, or EV plates, are non transferable.

As of 2013, these incentives were thought to make the E50 competitive with the price of an economy family car.

== MG Dynamo EV ==
MG Dynamo EV

The E50 was provided the basis of MG Dynamo EV, a concept car shown in the United Kingdom during spring 2014. The Dynamo uses a 71bhp electric motor developing 155Nm of torque, and has a range of 50 miles on a single charge.
