= MG 14/40 =

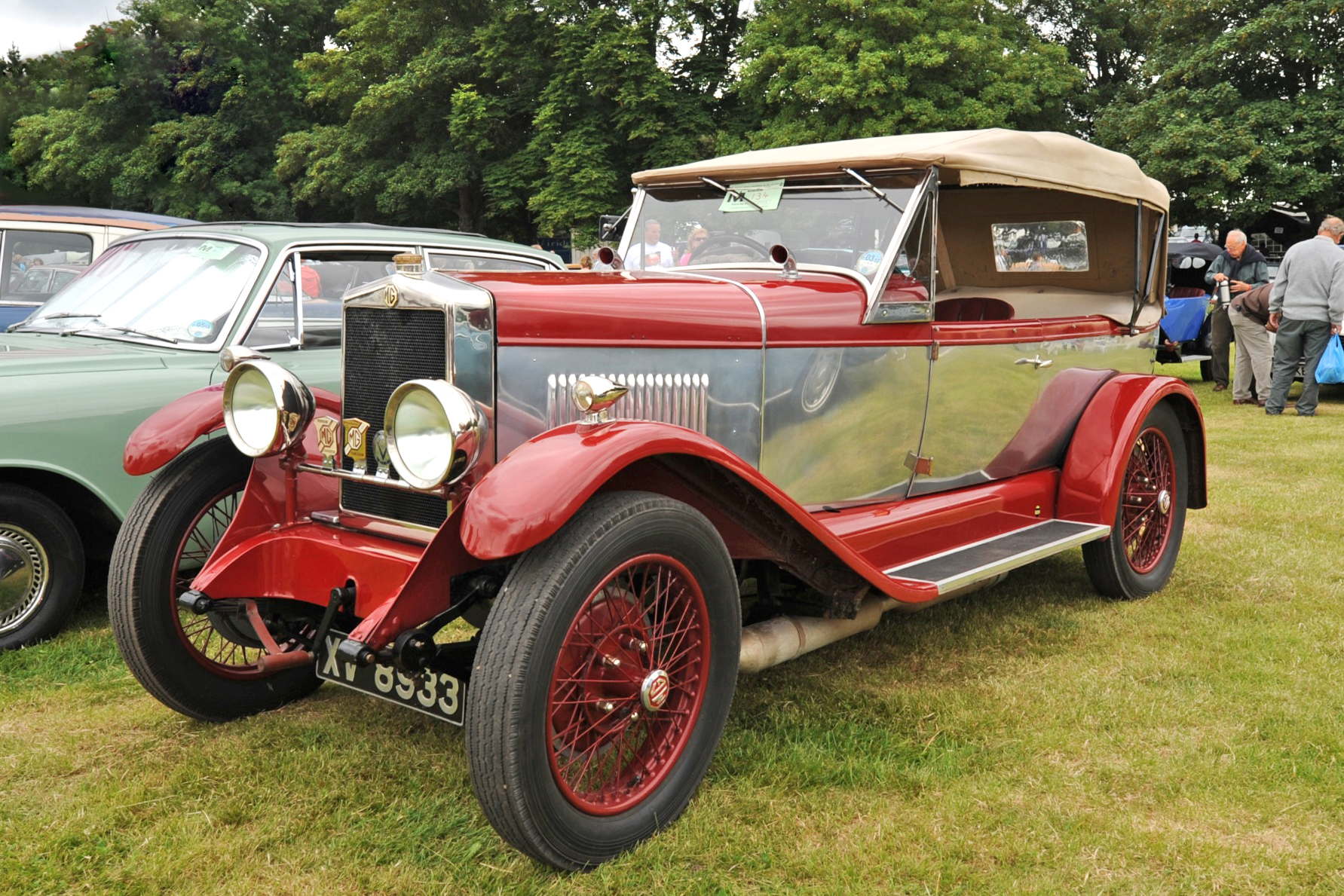
- 1929 Tourer Mark IV

Overview
- Manufacturer: MG
- Production: 1927–1929
- Assembly: United Kingdom: Cowley, Oxford, England

Body and chassis
- Class: Sports car
- Body style: 2-door, 2 and 4 seater open tourer 2 door coupé (Salonette); 4-door saloon

Powertrain
- Engine: 1802 cc four cylinder, side valve
- Transmission: three speed manual

Dimensions
- Wheelbase: 106 inches (2705 mm)
- Length: 150 inches (3810 mm)

Chronology
- Predecessor: MG 14/28
- Successor: MG 18/80

The MG 14/40 or MG 14/40 Mark IV is a sports car that was made by MG and launched in 1927. It was based on the contemporary Morris Oxford flatnose and was a development of the MG 14/28 and was built at Edmund Road, Cowley, Oxford where MG had moved in September 1927. During production it became the first model to carry an MG Octagon badge on its radiator, the previous cars had retained a Morris Oxford badge.

The change of name from 14/28 to 14/40 seems mainly to have been a marketing exercise and the reason for the Mark IV is unclear although it has been suggested that it represented the fourth year of production. Externally the cars are very difficult to tell apart.

There were some changes to the 14/28 chassis and suspension and the brake servo was deleted. Production ended in 1929, after approximately 700 cars had been built.

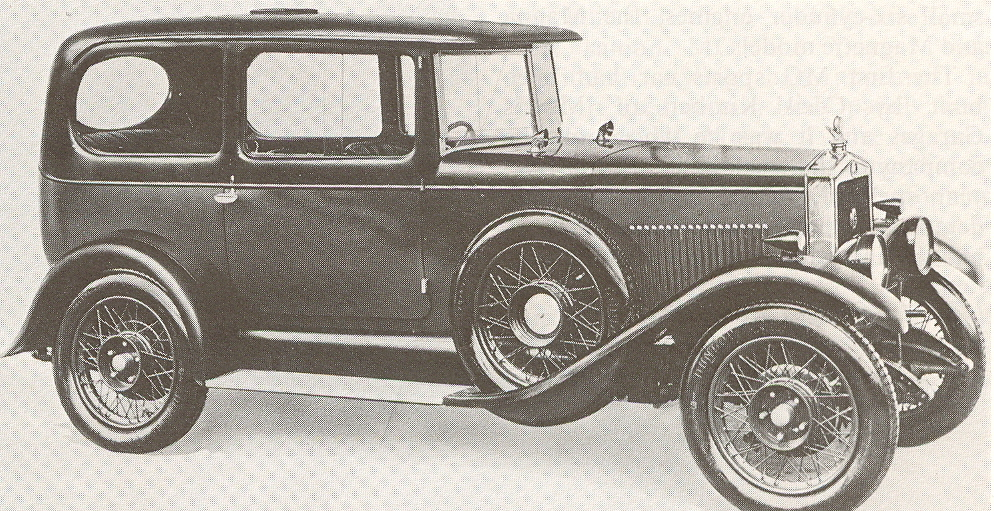
1927 Four-seater sedan

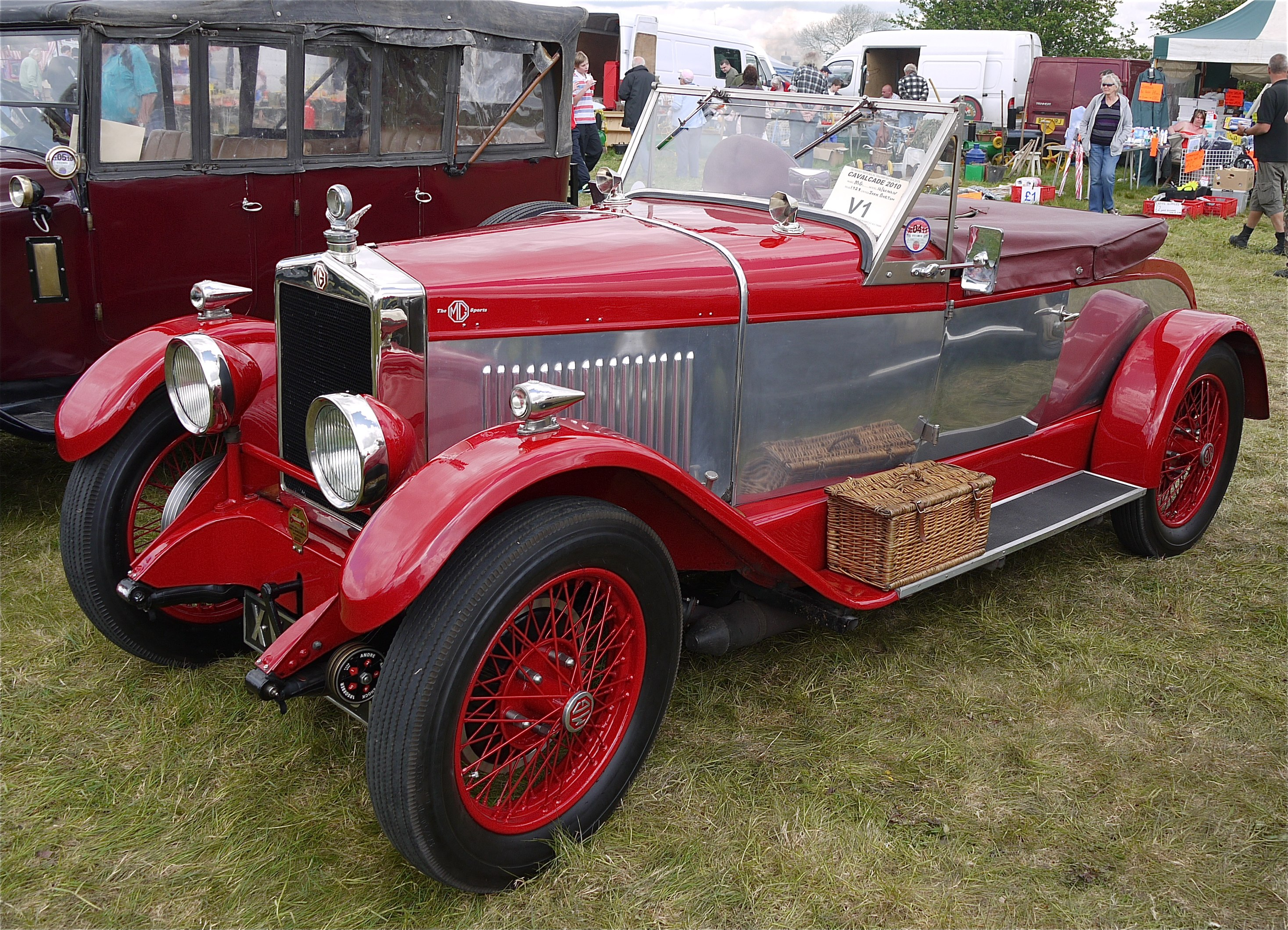
1928 Open two seater Mark IV
