= MG 14/28 =

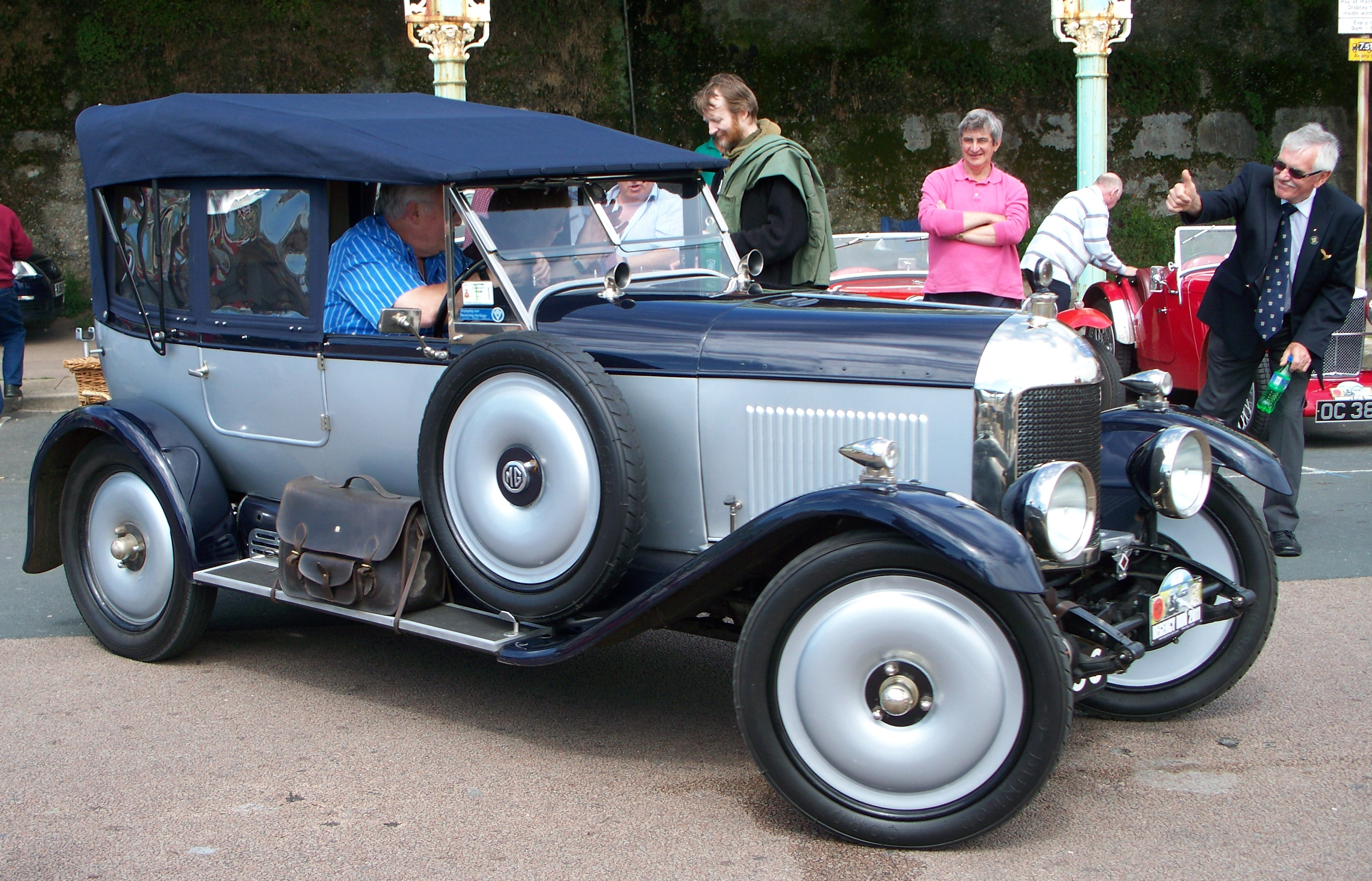
- Morris Oxford four-seater tourer early 1925

Overview
- Manufacturer: MG
- Production: 1924–1927; 400 built
- Assembly: United Kingdom: Longwall Street, Oxford

Body and chassis
- Class: Sports car
- Body style: 2-door, 2- and 4-seater open tourer 2-door coupé (Salonette)

Powertrain
- Engine: 1802 cc four-cylinder, side-valve.
- Transmission: three-speed manual

Dimensions
- Wheelbase: 106 inches (2705 mm)
- Length: 150 inches (3810 mm)

Chronology
- Predecessor: none
- Successor: MG 14/40

The MG 14/28 Super Sports is a sports car that was launched in 1924. It was the second line of cars produced by W R Morris's MG company. The first line of cars were 1548cc Morris Oxfords fitted with a two-seater body supplied by Charles Raworth & Sons of Oxford. They were built at first in small premises in Alfred Lane, Oxford, moving in 1925 to a larger site shared with Morris Motors Limited radiator factory at Bainton Road, Oxford. The badge on the front of the car still read Morris Oxford: MG badges were not to appear on the car's nose until 1928, but they did appear below the Morris badge on the honeycomb of the last of the 14-28 cars which had flat nose radiators.

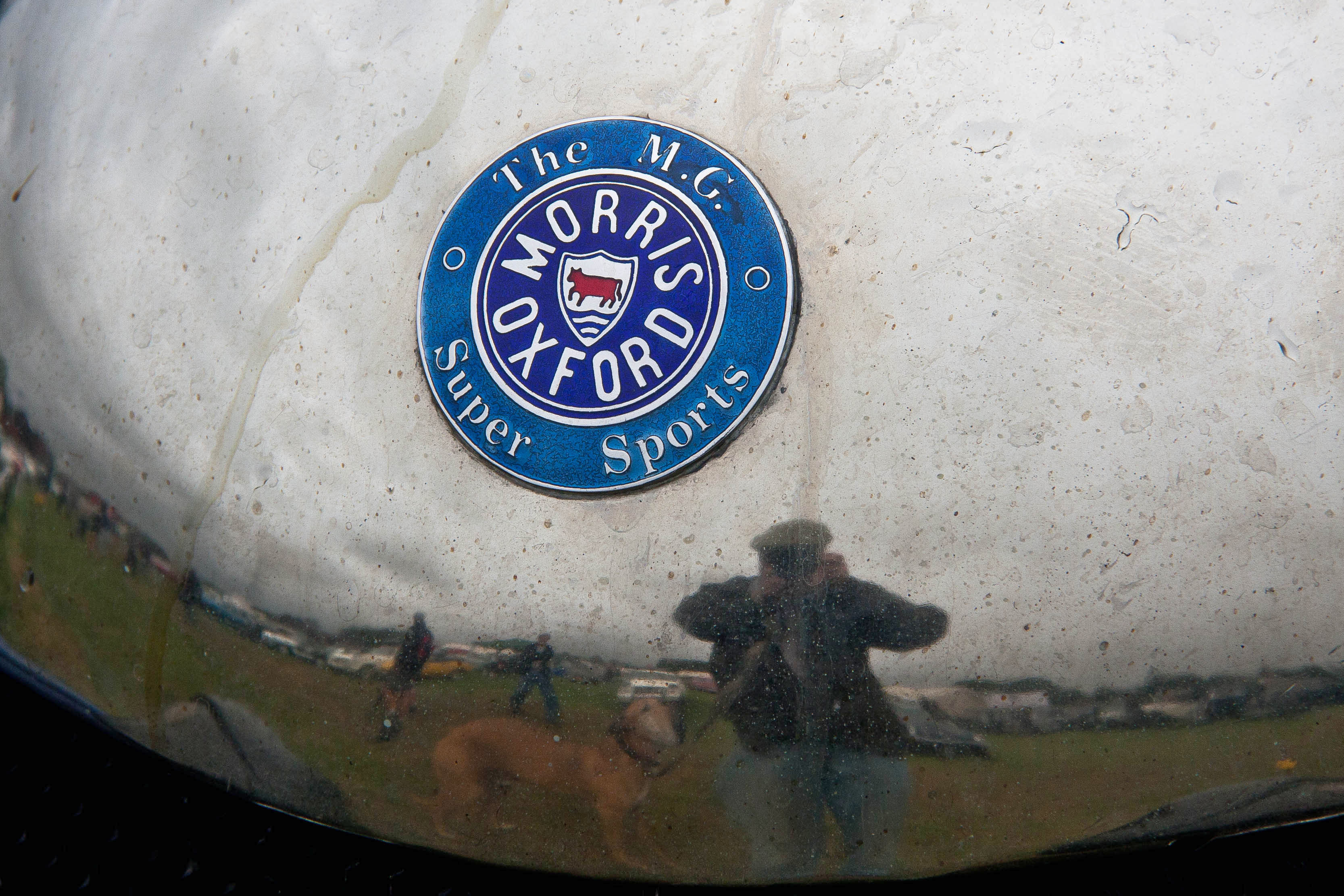

Cecil Kimber had rebodied a few Morris cars with coachwork to his own design but in 1924 he started to advertise "our popular M.G. Saloon" built on the Morris 14/28 Morris Oxford bullnose chassis. The basic chassis was collected from the nearby Cowley factory and slightly modified and the engine mildly tuned. They were then fitted with attractive aluminium panelled bodies painted in two colours with in 1924/5 bolt on artillery wheels with Ace discs and in 1925/6 bolt on wire spoke wheels.

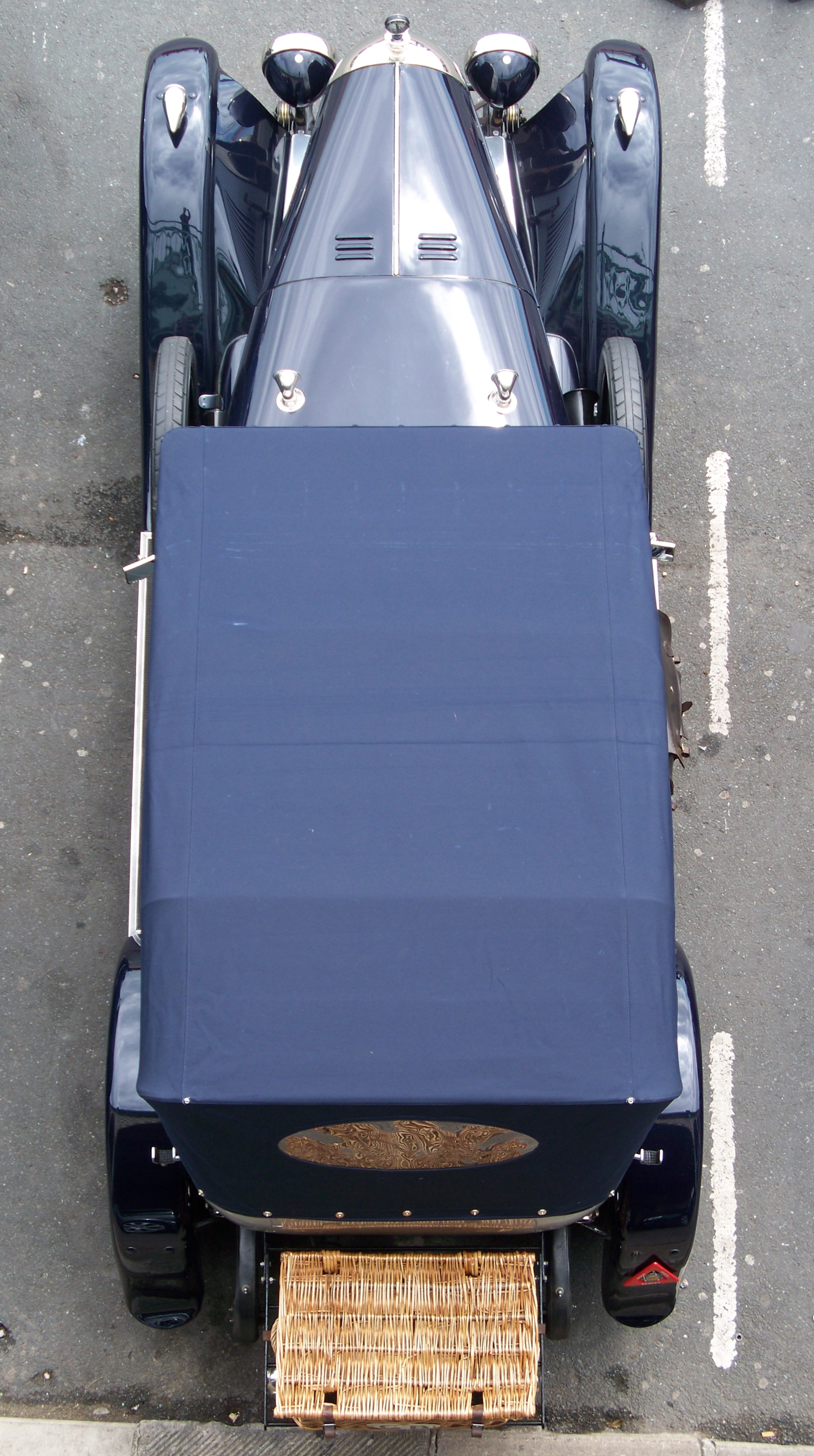

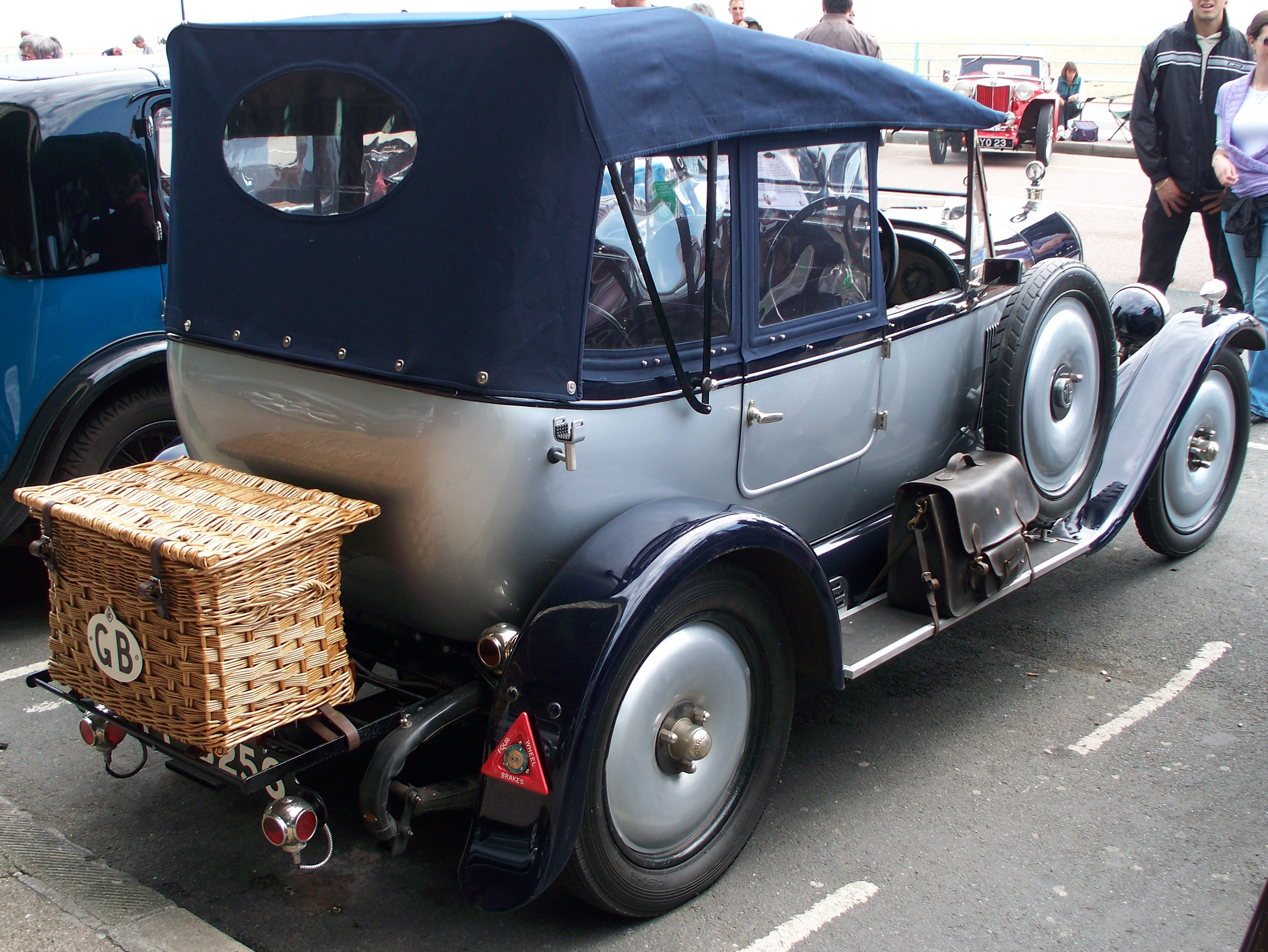
four-seater tourer 1925

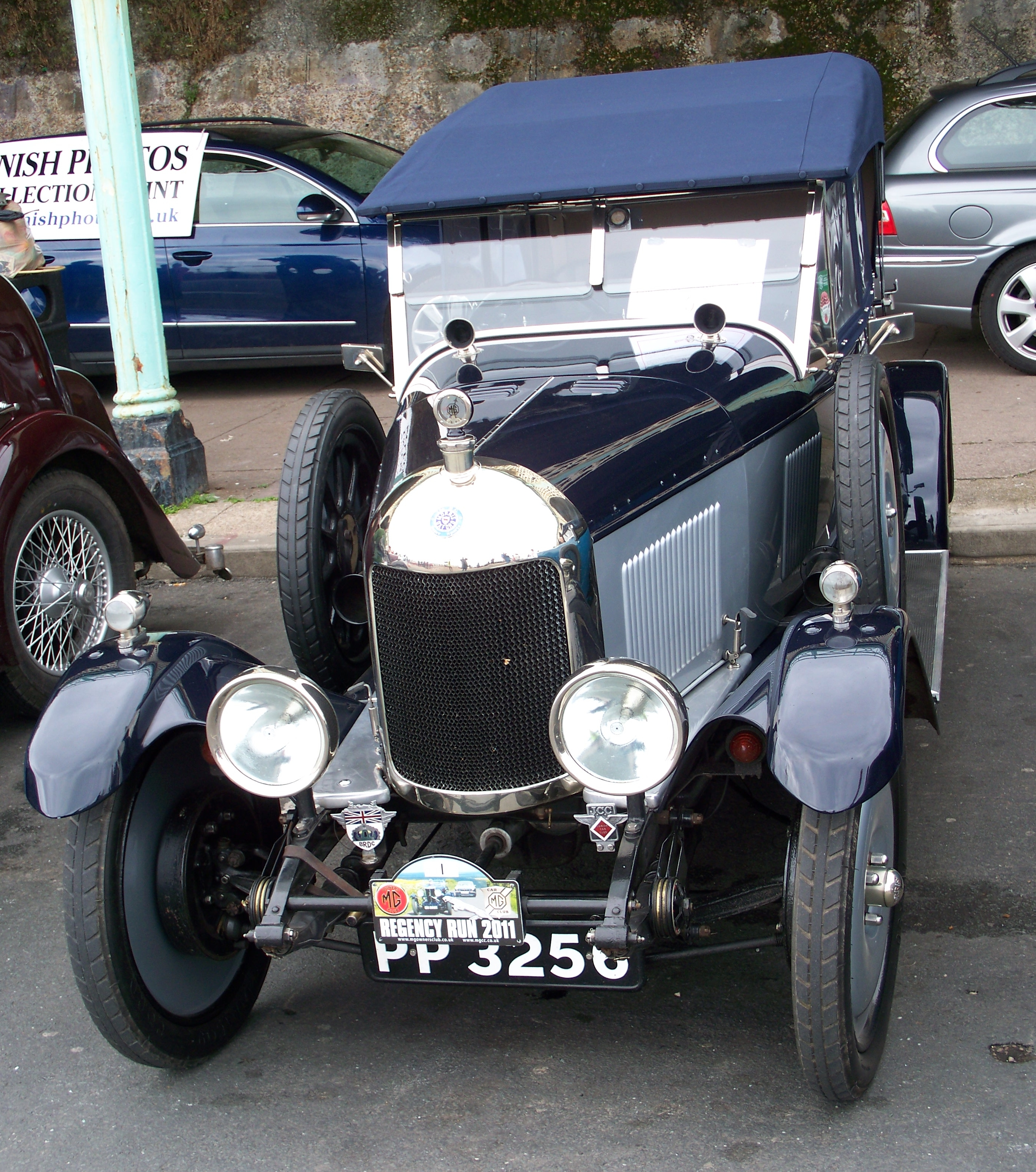

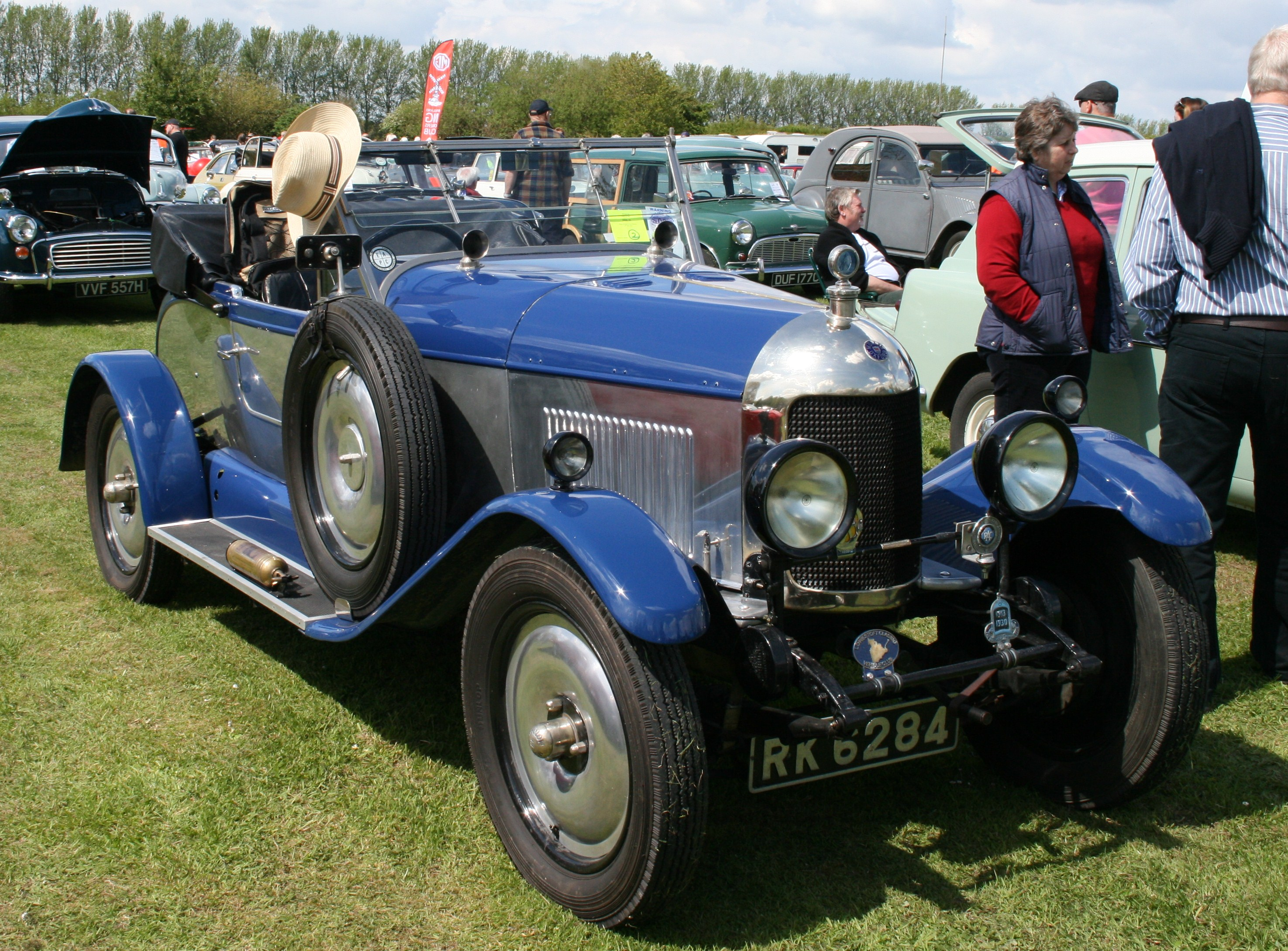
Morris Oxford 14-28 open two-seater 1926

From late 1924 front wheel brakes were fitted. Suspension was by half-elliptic leaf springs at the front and three-quarter elliptics at the rear. The top speed was approximately 65 mph (105 km/h).

A fabric-bodied saloon model was added to the range in 1926. In late 1926 Morris updated the Oxford dropping the distinctive Bullnose radiator in favour of a flat one and widening the chassis thus requiring a re-design of the body. H. N. Charles was employed by Kimber to do this and at the same time the basic chassis received improvements by Morris Garages to braking and suspension taking the MG car further away from its Morris roots. The revised car was heavier and the top speed dropped to around 60 mph (95 km/h). Other changes were half-elliptic springs at the rear and a Solex carburettor replacing the SU on the earlier car. The brakes received assistance from a mechanical servo.

The 14/28 was replaced by the very similar 14/40 in 1927, after approximately 400 had been built.
