= Hubert N. Charles =

Hubert Noel Charles
- Born: 1893; Barnet, Hertfordshire
- Died: 1982 (aged 88–89); Oxford
- Occupations: Engineer, designer

Hubert Noel Charles (1893–1982) was an English automotive engineer most famous for his work at the MG Car Company.

== Early years ==
H. N. Charles was born on 22 November 1893 in Barnet the son of Thomas Charles, a Solicitor, and his wife Constance Emily. and educated at Highgate school and University College London where he gained a degree in engineering.

In 1914 he joined the Royal Naval Air Service as a mechanic before moving to the Royal Flying Corps where he was Engineering Officer to No 56 Squadron. By the end of the war he had been promoted to Captain.

After the war he joined Zenith Carburettors as a Sales Engineer and then Automotive Products before getting a job in 1924 as a trouble shooter with Morris Motors at Cowley.

== MG ==
In 1925 Hubert Charles met Cecil Kimber of the MG Car Company and although still working for Morris started doing work for MG in his spare time making the MG bodies fit the new Morris Oxford chassis and went on to design a "Comparator", an early rolling road, on which cars could be adjusted. In 1928 he officially joined MG as Chief Draughtsman. The MG M-type Midget was launched in 1929 with the overhead camshaft Wolseley engine of 20bhp output which did not satisfy Charles so he revised the camshaft increasing the power to 27bhp for 1930. This work led him on to the supercharged engine for the C-Type, still based on the original Wolsley design, where the output was 62bhp. As engine power increased the traditional leaf sprung chassis increasingly could not cope so Charles designed a backbone chassis with all-round independent suspension for the R-Type.

In 1935 MG became part of Morris Motors and Charles was moved to the main design office at Cowley where he worked on cars for both marques including designing the front suspension for the Morris Ten.

== Later life ==
H. N. Charles left Morris in 1938 to join Rotol Airscrews as Chief Engineer where he developed a reversing gear and a blade-feathering device. before joining Austin in 1943 as development engineer and was responsible for the coil-sprung front suspension of the Austin A40. He clashed with the chairman of Austin Leonard Lord and left the company in 1958 to found his own engineering consultancy.

Hubert Charles retired to Teddington in around 1961 and died in Oxford on 18 January 1982 at the age of 88.
