= Lester-MG T51 =

Sports race car

Lester-MG T51 (MG Special)
- Category: Sports car
- Constructor: MG
- Designer: Harry Lester

Technical specifications
- Chassis: Steel tubular spaceframe
- Suspension (front): Independent, unequal length A-arms, coil springs, knee-action hydraulic shock absorbers, rack and pinion steering
- Suspension (rear): Leaf springs, shock absorbers
- Engine: XPAG later MGA B-series 1.5 L (91.5 cu in) I4 naturally-aspirated mid-engined
- Transmission: 4-speed manual
- Power: 85 hp (63 kW)
- Weight: 1,300 lb (590 kg)
- Brakes: Drum brakes

Competition history

The Lester-MG T51, also known as the MG Special, the Lester T51, or the MG T51, is a sports race car, designed, developed and built by Harry Lester, and based on the MG TC, between 1949 and 1954. Only 18 models were produced, and only 4 cars are known to have survived.
