= Roewe Clever =

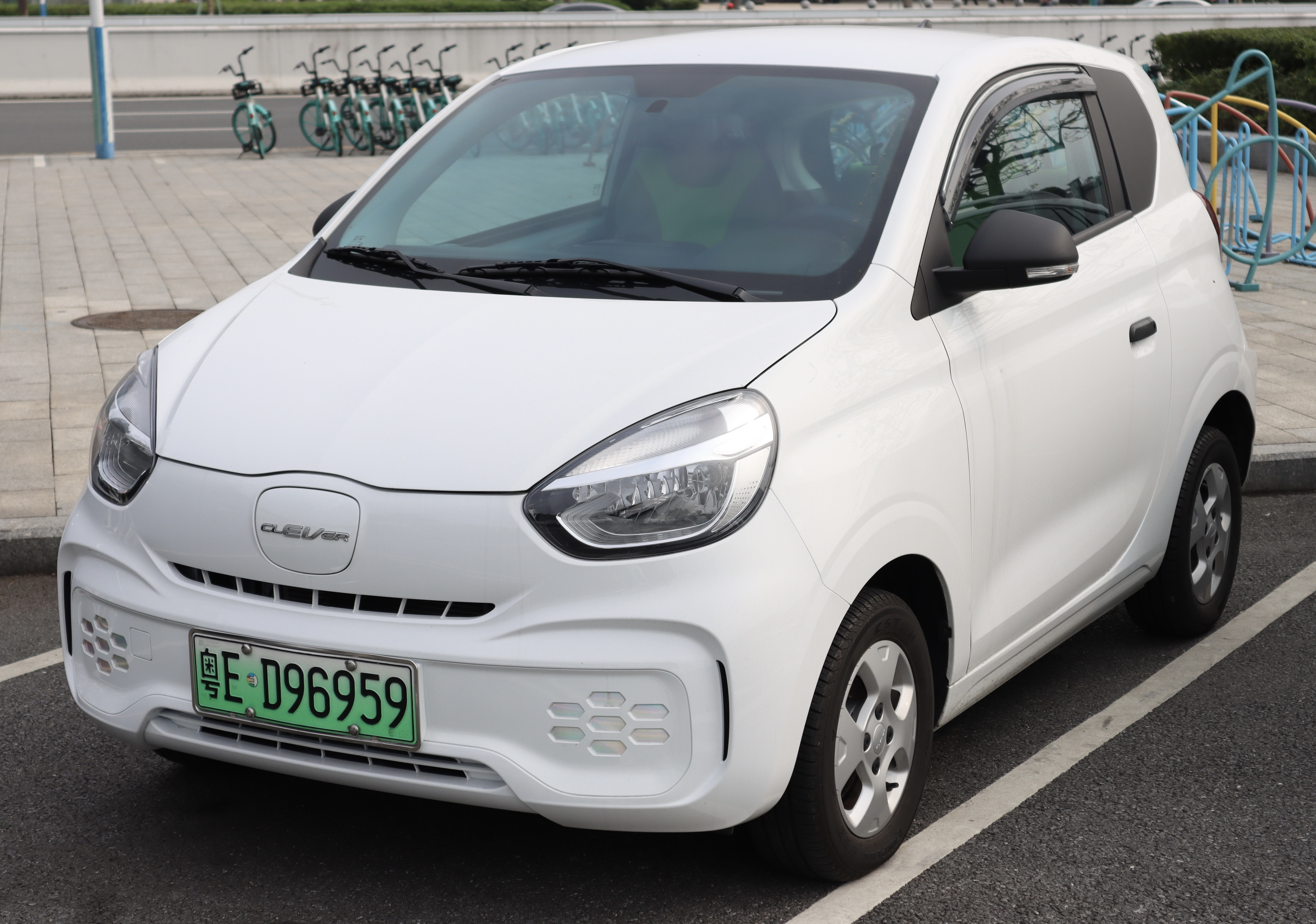

Overview
- Manufacturer: Roewe (SAIC Motor)
- Production: 2020–2025
- Assembly: China: Pukou, Nanjing

Body and chassis
- Class: City car
- Body style: 3-door hatchback
- Layout: Front-motor, front-wheel-drive

Powertrain
- Electric motor: 37 kW (50 PS; 50 hp) Permanent magnet motor
- Transmission: Single-speed automatic
- Battery: 27 kWh lithium polymer (LMP) battery

Dimensions
- Wheelbase: 2,000 mm (78.7 in)
- Length: 3,140 mm (123.6 in)
- Width: 1,648 mm (64.9 in)
- Height: 1,531 mm (60.3 in)
- Kerb weight: 950 kg (2,094 lb)

Chronology
- Predecessor: Roewe E50

The Roewe Clever (Chinese: 科莱威) is a battery electric city car produced by SAIC Motor under the Roewe brand.

== Overview ==
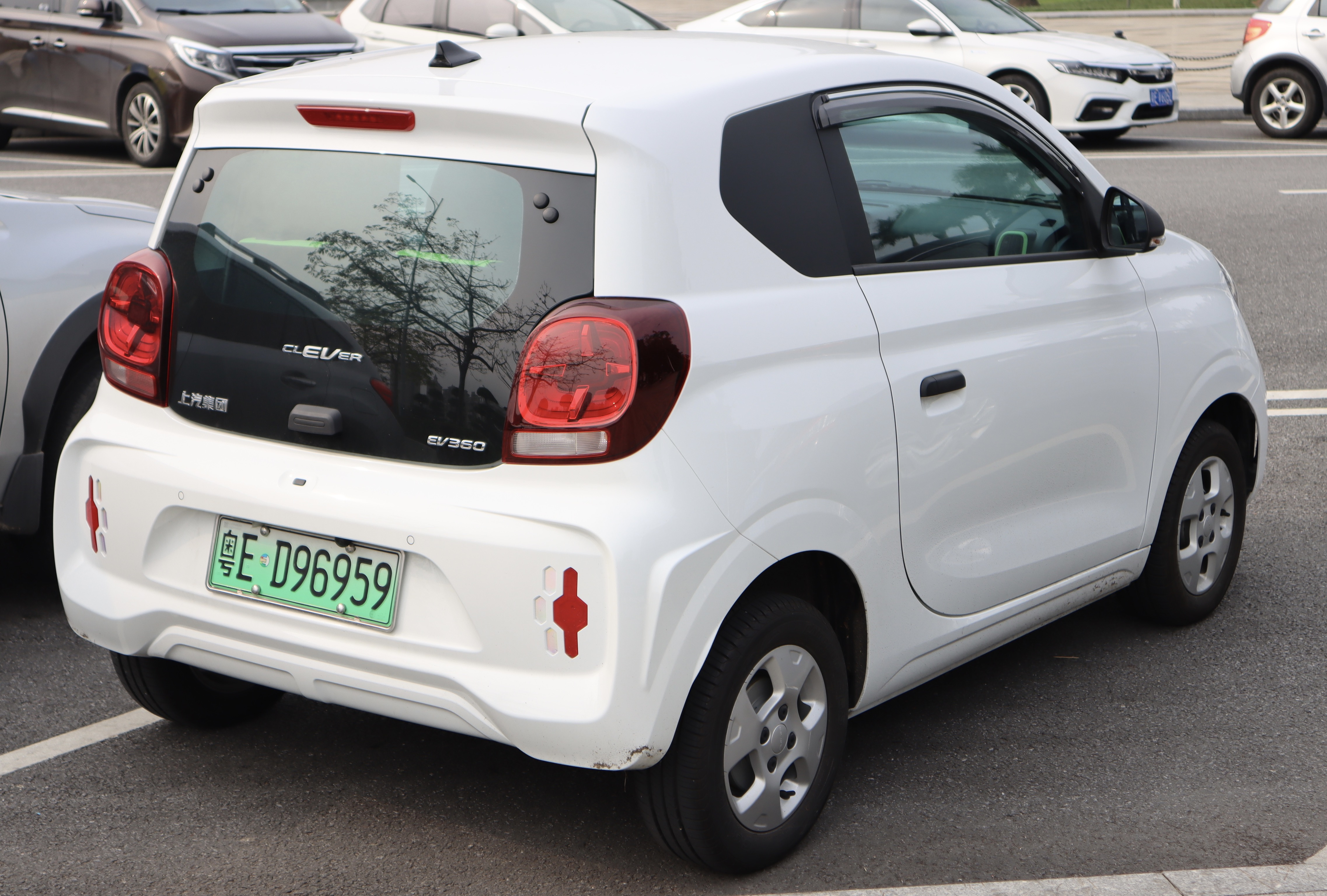
Roewe Clever rear

The Clever was launched in March 2020 as an electric city car aiming to replace the Roewe E50 with a 27kWh battery and a NEDC range of 260 km. In November 2012, SAIC Motor introduced the production version of the Roewe E50, a four-seater supermini sized hatchback for the market in China.

The Clever has a front positioned 37 kW and 100Nm motor with a 27 kWh battery pack that delivers a range of 260 km (160 mi) and a top speed of up to 100 km/h (62 mph).

In 2020, the Clever electric car was offered in a single trim, with pricing starting at CN¥59,999 after available government incentives.
