= Roewe =

Chinese car brand owned by SAIC Motor

- Type: Division
- Industry: Automotive
- Founded: 2006; 20 years ago
- Headquarters: Shanghai, China
- Area served: China; United Arab Emirates; Uzbekistan
- Products: Automobiles
- Parent: SAIC Motor
- Subsidiaries: Rising Auto
- Website: www.roewe.com.cn

Roewe
- Simplified Chinese: 荣威
- Traditional Chinese: 榮威
Transcriptions
Standard Mandarin
- Hanyu Pinyin: Róngwēi
- Wade–Giles: Jung^{2}-wei^{1}
- IPA: [ʐʊ̌ŋwu̯éɪ̯]
Yue: Cantonese
- Yale Romanization: Wìhngwāi
- Jyutping: Wing4 wai1

Roewe (Chinese: 荣威; pinyin: Róngwēi) is an automotive brand owned by the Chinese automaker SAIC Motor since 2006. Roewe vehicles were initially based on technology acquired from defunct British carmaker MG Rover. SAIC was unable to purchase the rights to the Rover brand name (which was retained by BMW, subsequently sold to Ford and ultimately returned to Jaguar Land Rover) and created the Roewe marque as a replacement. Roewe vehicles are sold in most export markets outside China under the MG marque.

== Name ==
The name Roewe originates from SAIC's failure to acquire the Rover brand name from BMW c. 2005 (it was instead sold to Ford in 2006, and the brand is currently owned by Jaguar Land Rover). Composed of the Chinese characters Róng and wēi, which roughly mean "glorious power", the name is a transliteration of Rover, although SAIC has stated that it is derived from Löwe, the German word for lion.

== History ==
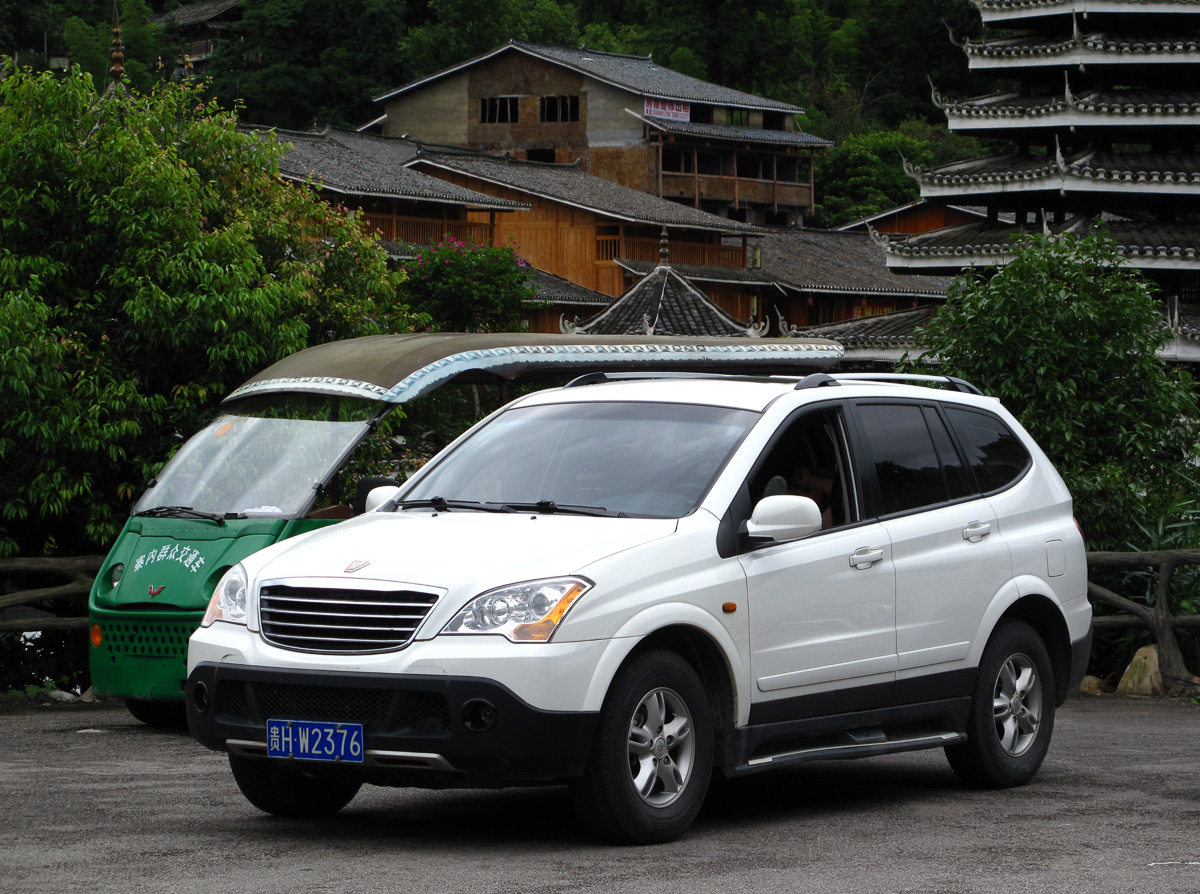
Roewe W5

SAIC purchased technology relating to the Rover 75 and Rover 25 after the 2005 collapse of MG Rover, and the Roewe marque first appeared on a version of the 75, the Roewe 750. Originally intending to purchase all assets of the failed British company, SAIC was outbid by Nanjing Automobile. In 2007, SAIC merged with Nanjing Auto, so it now controls those MG Rover properties, such as the MG name and a Birmingham factory, the Longbridge plant, that it was initially unable to acquire.

English engineering firm Ricardo assisted the development of early Roewe models and set up a new joint venture company in the UK, Ricardo (2010) Consultants Ltd, which helped bring the 750 to market. According to SAIC, work on the vehicle was also done in China. In 2007, Ricardo (2010) was purchased by SAIC and renamed SAIC Motor UK Technical Centre. It employs over 200 British ex-Rover engineers.

The Roewe brand unveiled the Roewe Vision-R electric concept car at the 2015 Auto Guangzhou in China that and previews a new generation of the Roewe design language for the Chinese brand, featuring sharp creases and a full-width grille that evolved from the previous Roewe shield grille. The new design theme was applied to products launched shortly after such as the Roewe i5, i6, RX3, RX5, RX7, RX8, and Marvel X, as well as facelifts of the Roewe 950 and Roewe 360 Plus.

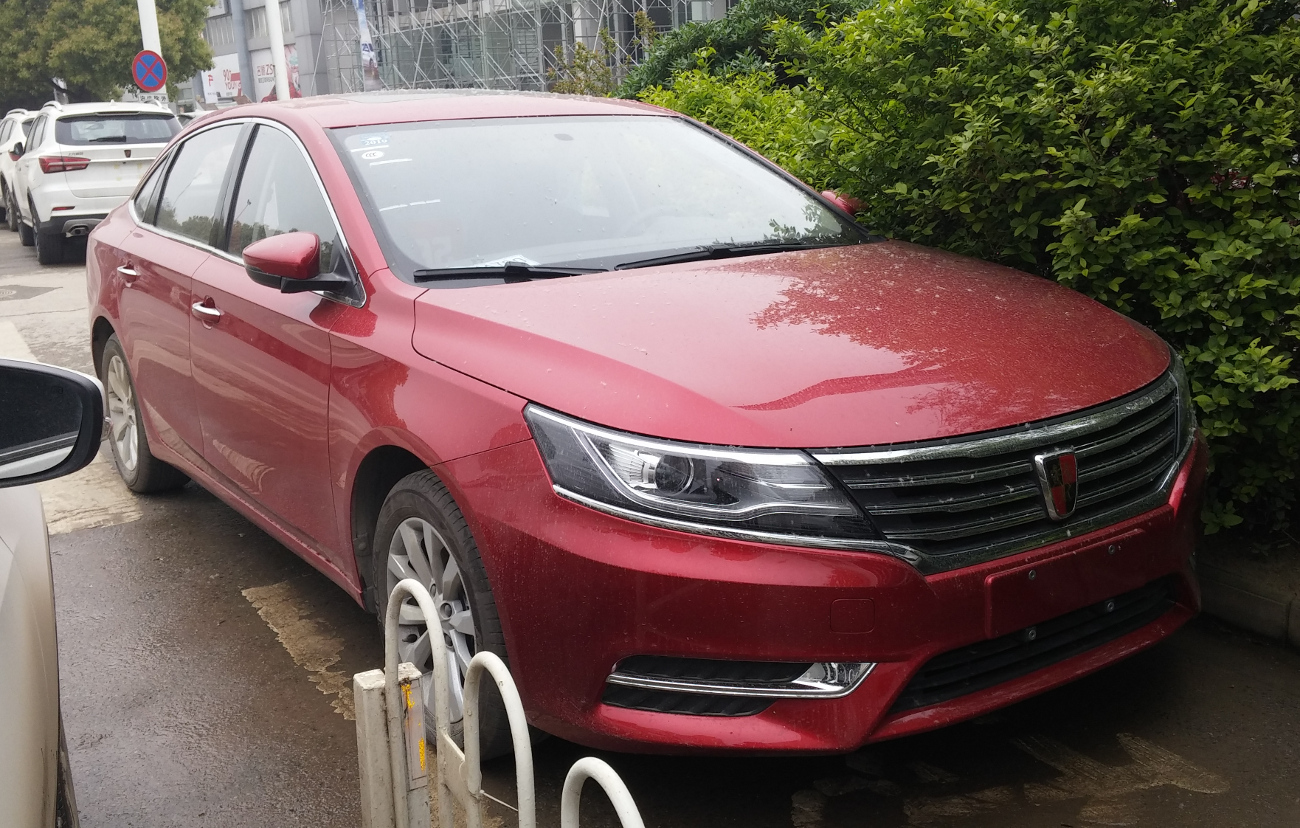
Roewe i6

In 2016, Roewe adopted a new design strategy, introducing a more streamlined alphanumeric naming system and a styling approach that featured fewer curves. The first model to represent this shift was the Roewe RX5 SUV, developed in partnership with Alibaba Group, which provided the software for the vehicle. In 2018, Roewe debuted its first electric SUV, the Marvel X, and expanded its offerings with the introduction of the Ei5, a fully electric 5-door station wagon.

In 2021, the brand launched its first coupe SUV, the Jing, followed by the release of the hybrid RX3 Pro variant, named Lomemo, in 2022. That same year saw the introduction of a new design language for the RX5's next generation and the release of the premium RX9. In 2023, Roewe introduced a new model line, the D7, while simultaneously streamlining its portfolio by phasing out older, less popular models.

In November 2024, SAIC Motor Passenger Vehicle announced to roll back the Rising Auto brand into Roewe, ending its history as an independent brand. Rising would turned into a premium electric product line under Roewe.

== Logo Evolution ==
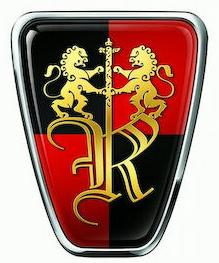
2007–2018

2018–present

SAIC didn't decide to create a new name (autrement dit, a new brand) and a new logo, more than imitate Rover. The new Roewe logo retains the shape of the Rover logo but removes the longship (linked to the history of England) in favor of two lions surrounding a sword, overlooking a Gothic R and with a checkerboard in the background inspired by that of the German manufacturer BMW, but with the colors red and black.

The two lions and the sword feature Chinese and not European script, which reinforces the identity of the new brand.

In 2018, SAIC adopted a new logo for Roewe while retaining the shape of the previous one. A new blue colour is associated with innovation and high quality, but with the removal of the checkerboard in the background. The capital letters Roewe are located below the crest.

== Products ==
=== Roewe ===
==== Car ====
- Roewe i5 (2017–present), compact sedan
- Roewe i6 (2026–present), compact sedan
- Roewe D6 (2025–present), mid-size sedan
- Roewe D7 (2023–present), mid-size sedan
  - Roewe D7 DMH (2023–present), PHEV variant of D7
  - Roewe M7 (2025–present), upgraded variant of D7

==== SUV ====
- Roewe Jiayue 06 (to commence), mid-size SUV
- Roewe Jiayue 07 (2026–present), mid-size SUV
- Roewe Jiayue X7 (to commence), mid-size SUV

==== MPV ====
- Roewe iMAX8 (2020–present), full-size MPV
  - Roewe iMAX8 DMH (2024–present), PHEV variant of iMAX8
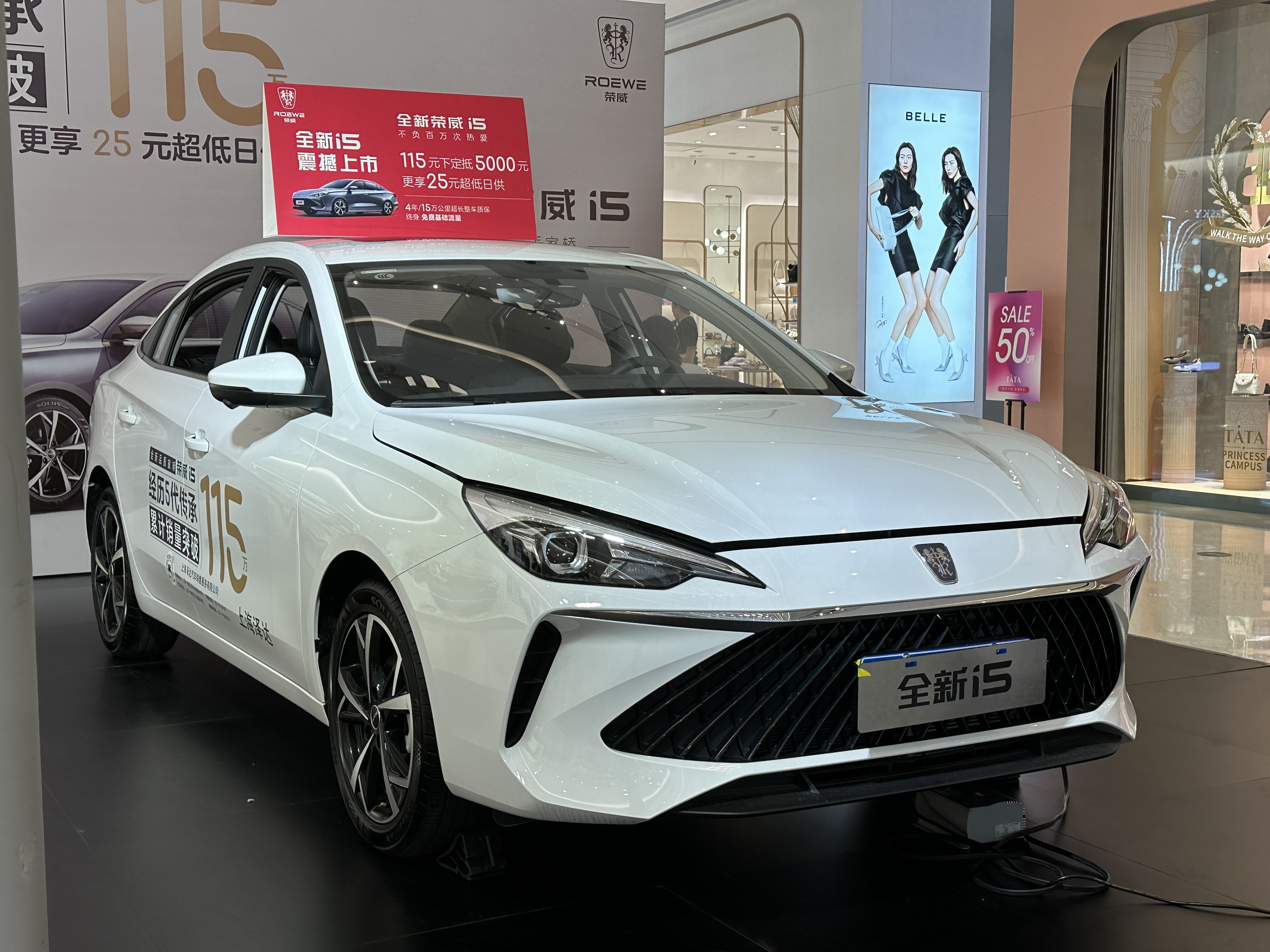
Roewe i5

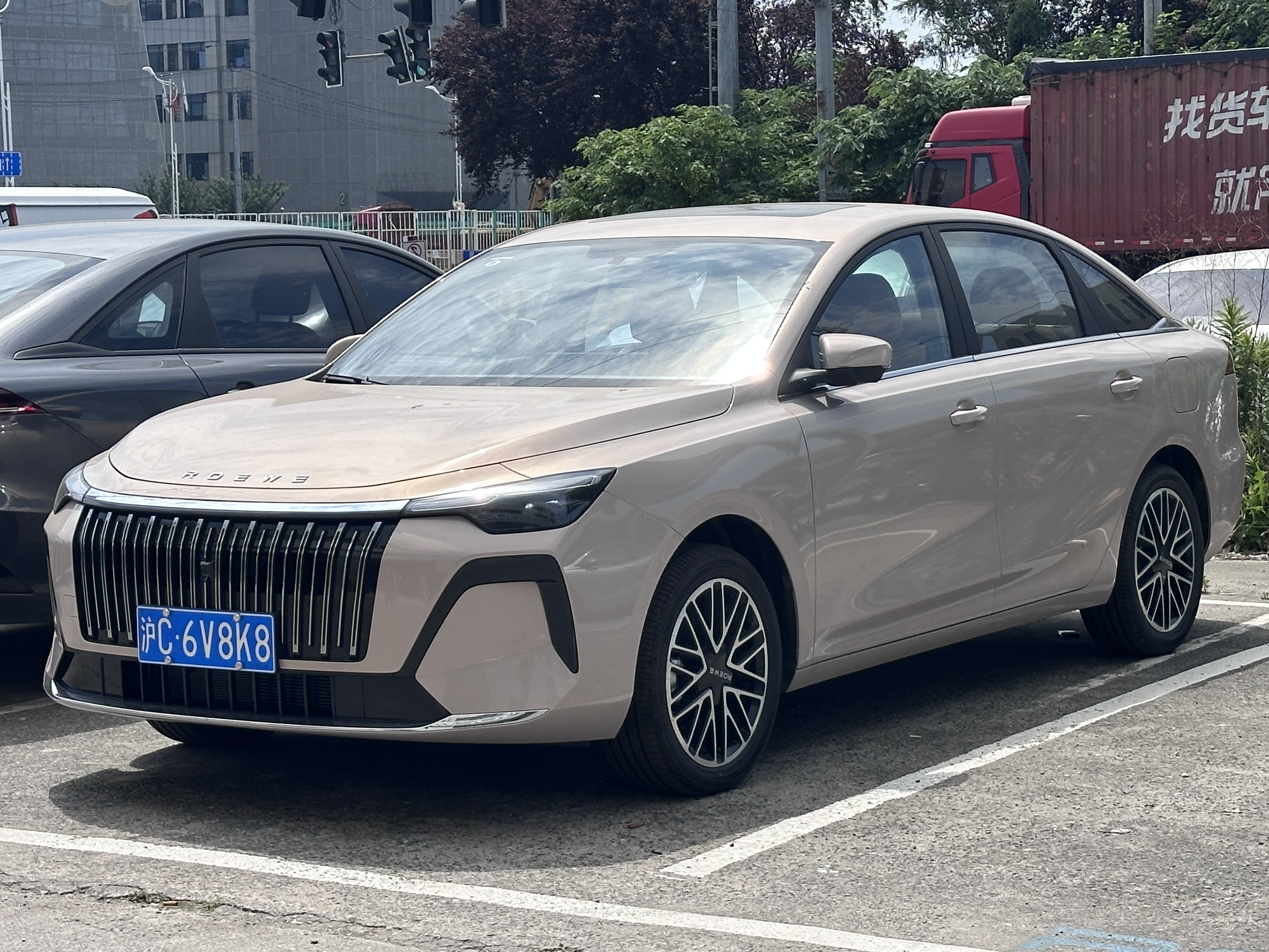
Roewe i6 II

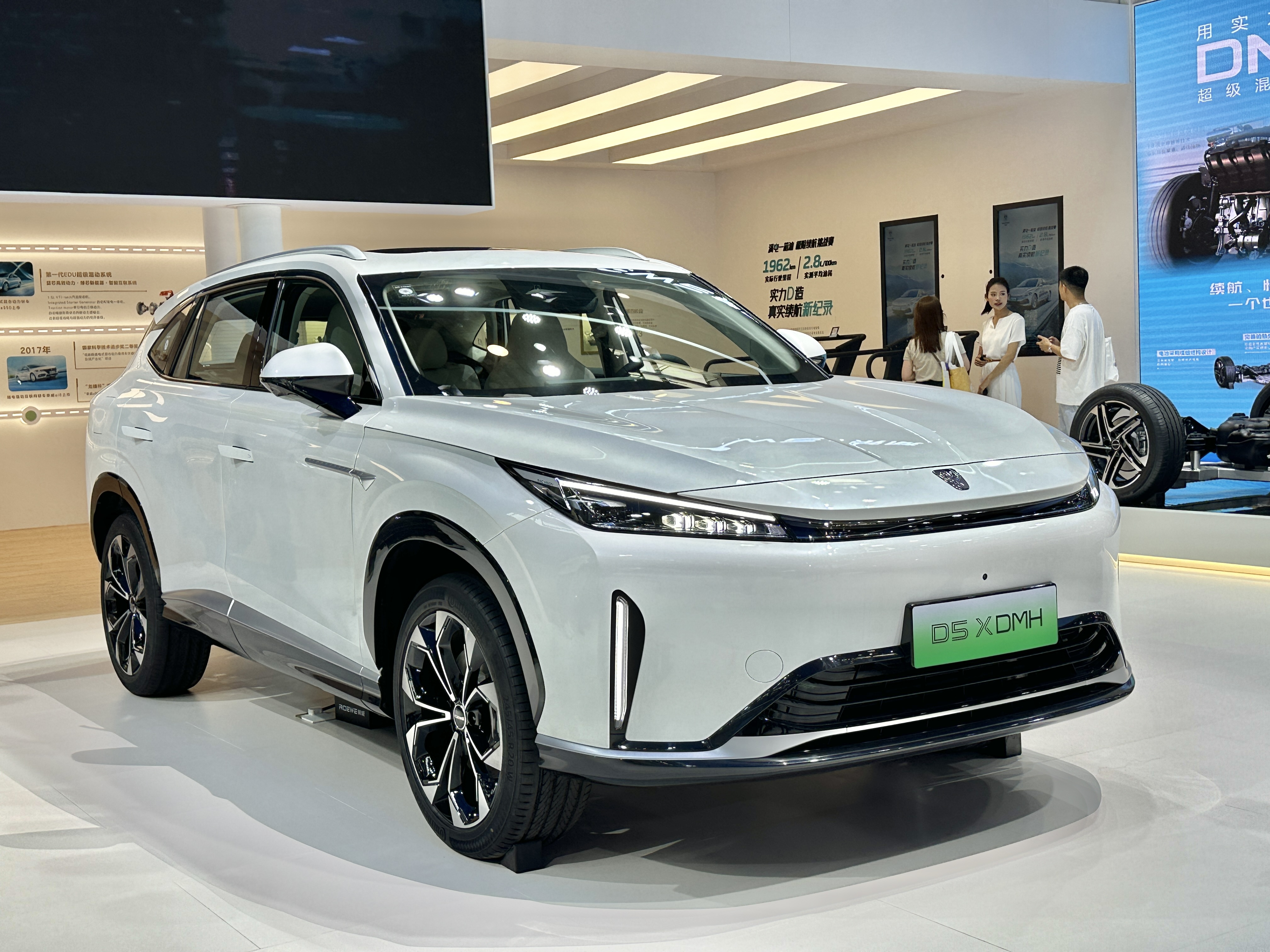
Roewe D5X

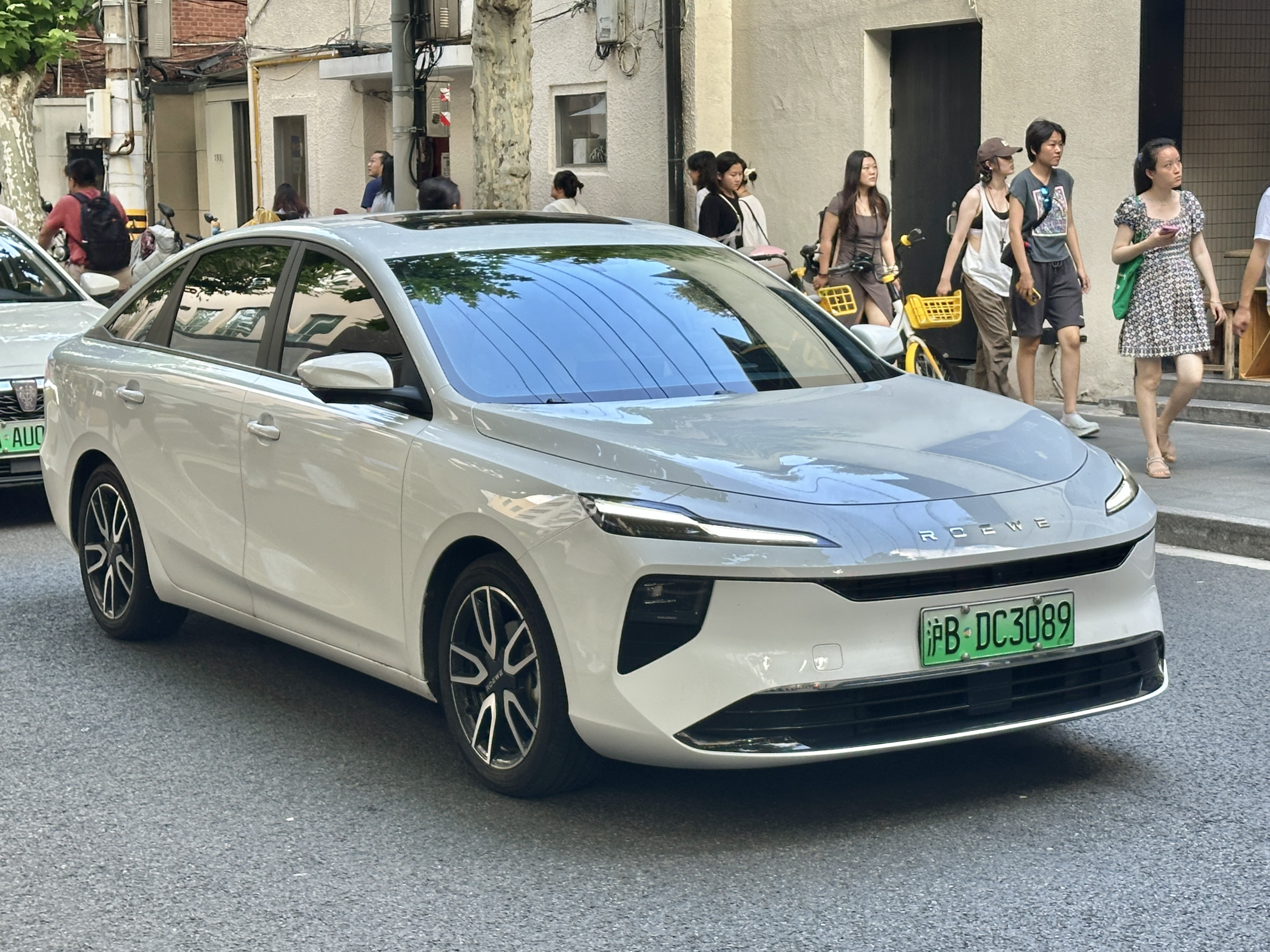
Roewe D6

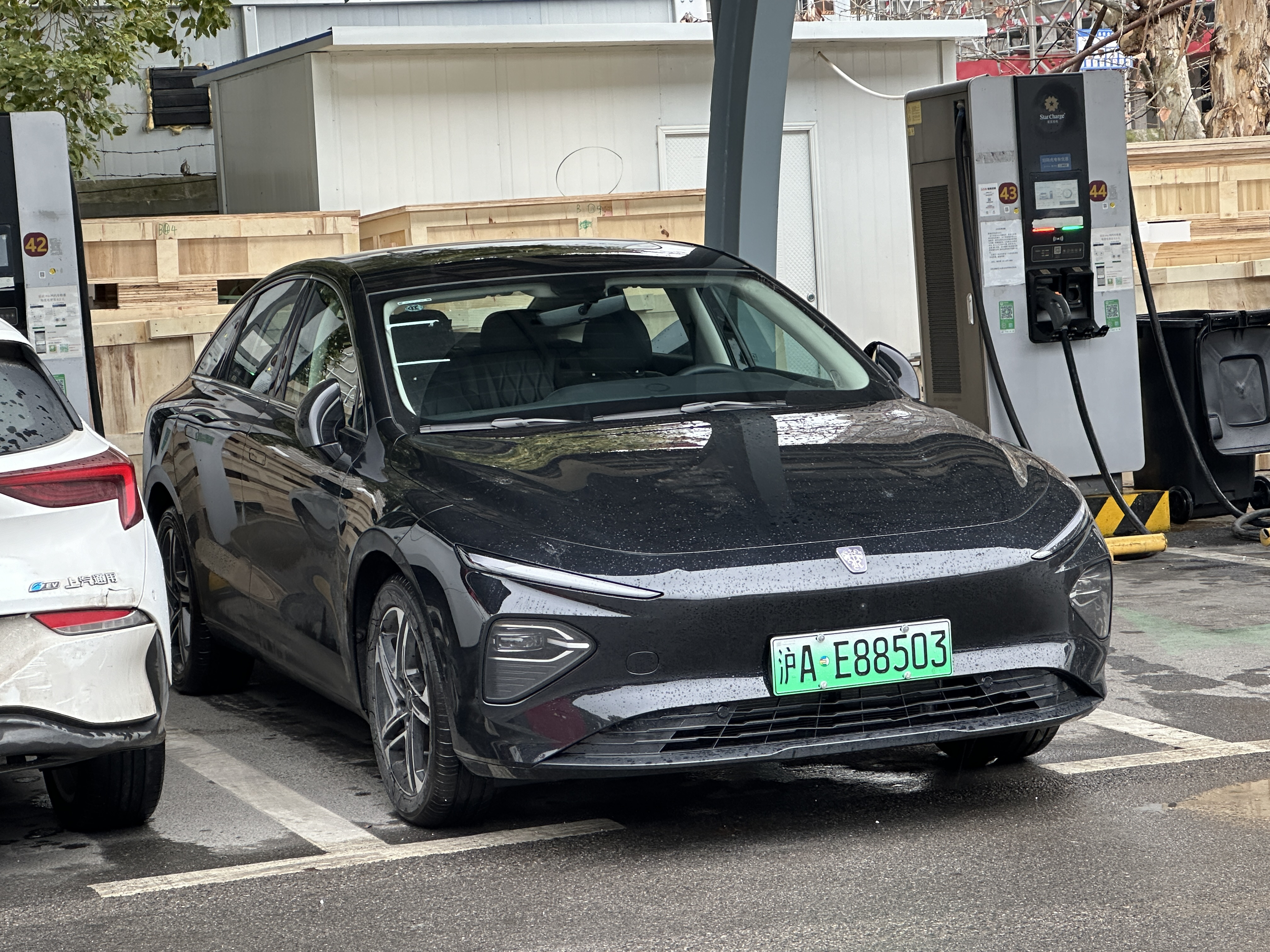
Roewe D7

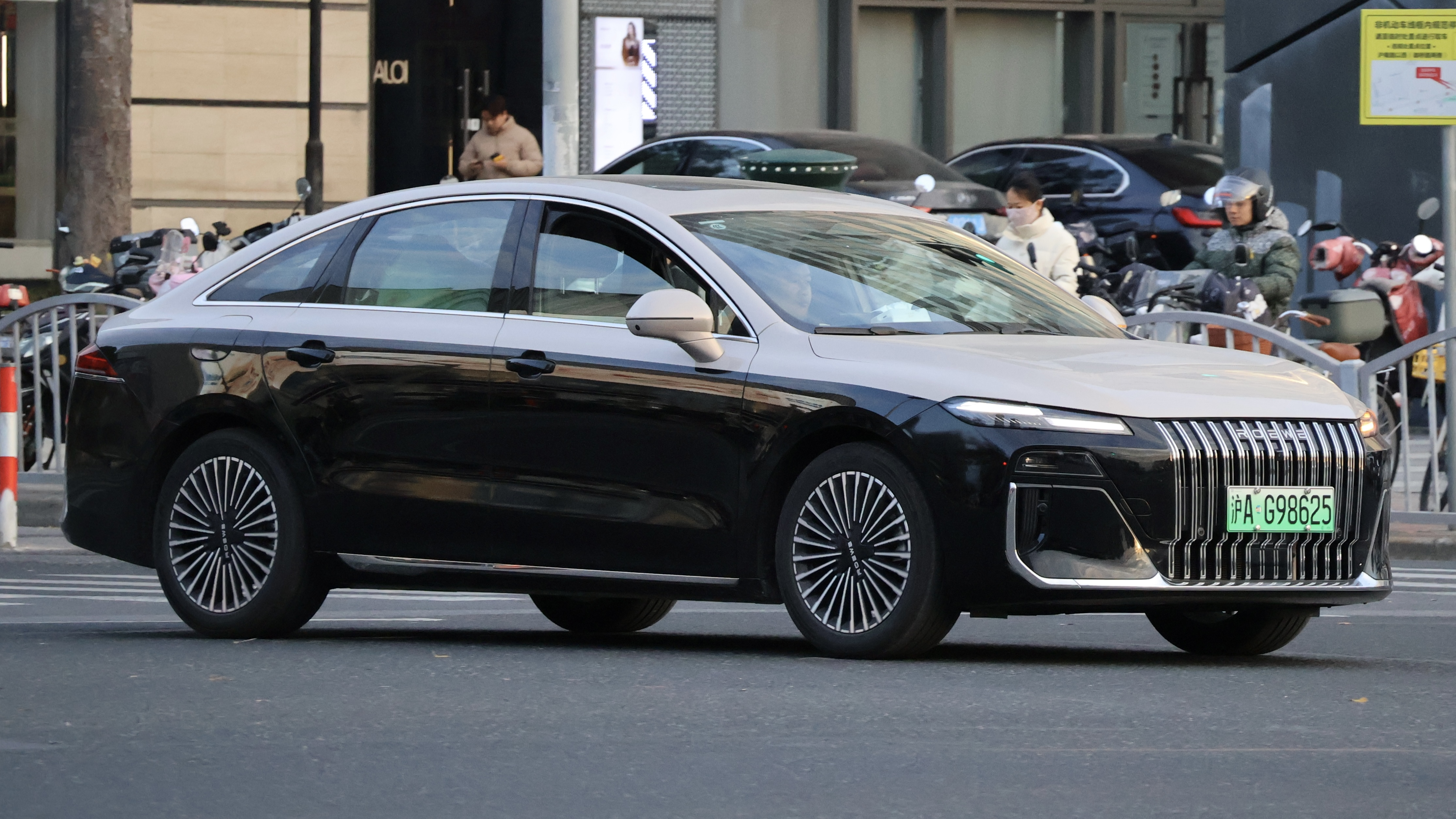
Roewe M7

Roewe Jiayue 07

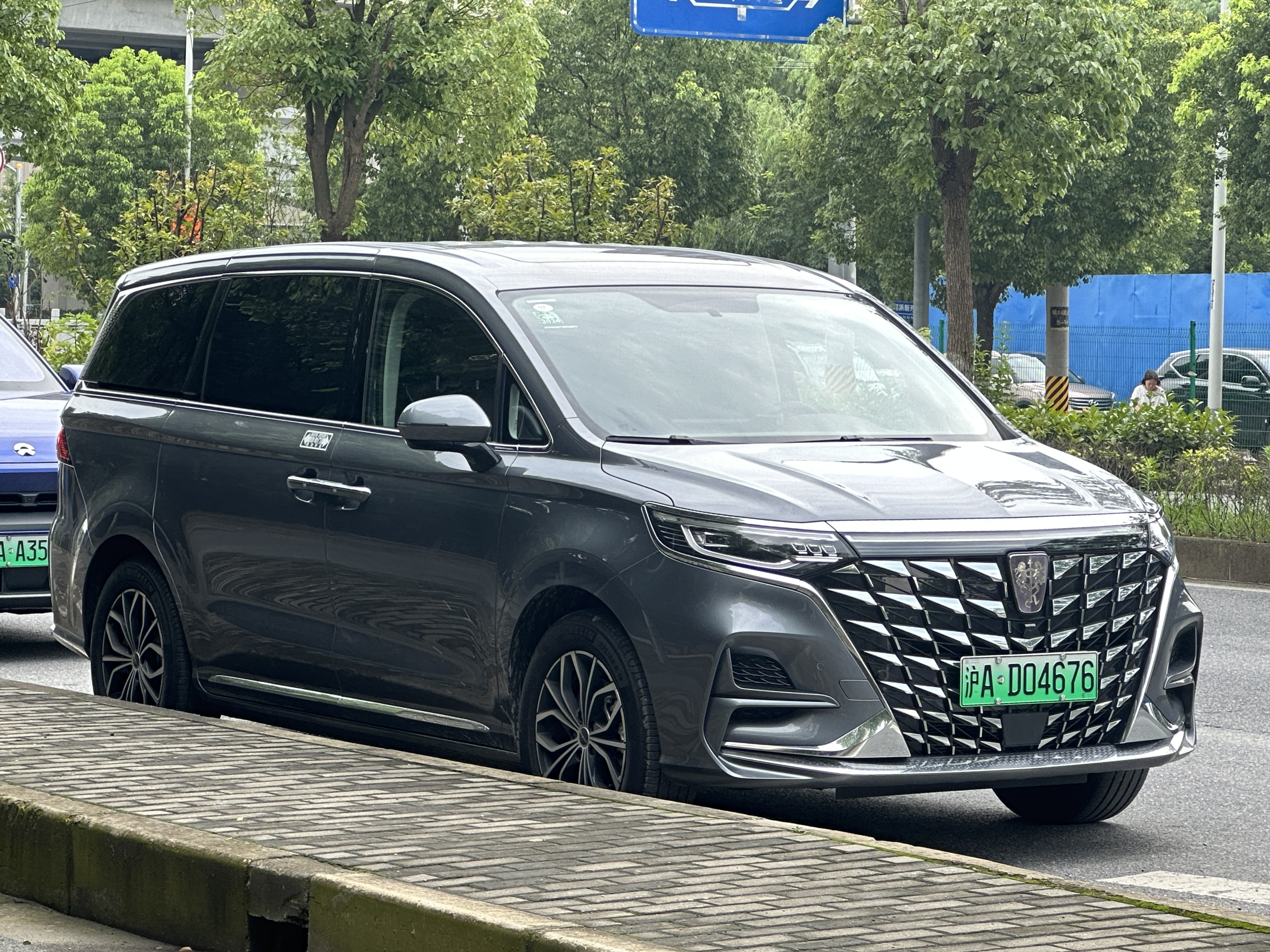
Roewe iMAX8

=== Rising Auto ===
Rising Auto was originally the "R Brand" in 2020, an offshoot of SAIC's Roewe brand for electric vehicles. It was operated as an independent brand since 2021 but rolled back into Roewe in 2024. It is currently positioned as Roewe's premium product line.

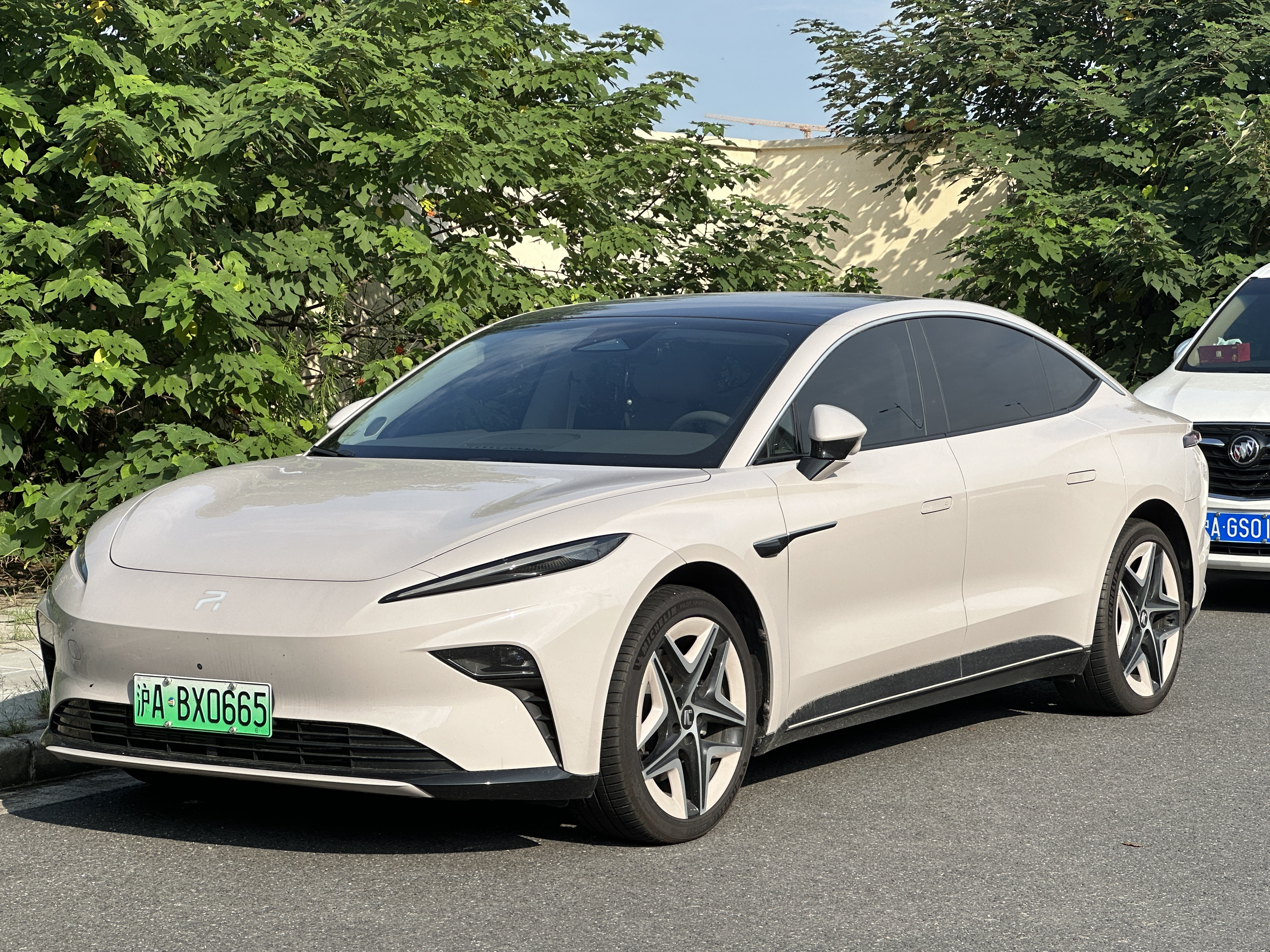
Rising Auto F7

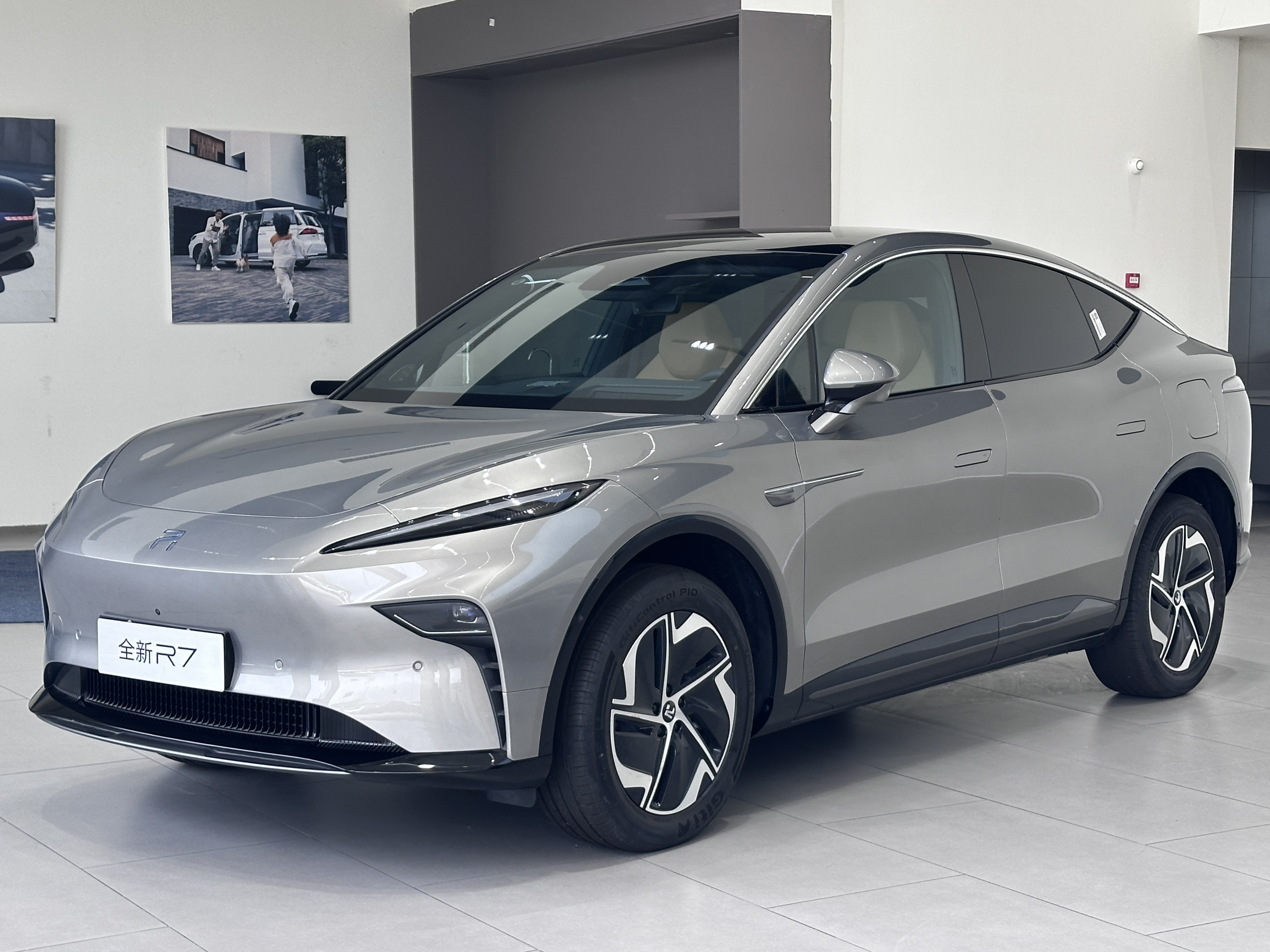
Rising Auto R7

=== Former models ===
==== Car ====
- Roewe Clever (2020–2025), city car
- Roewe E50 (2013–2016), city car
- Roewe Ei5 (2017–2025), compact station wagon
- Roewe ei6 (2017–2020), PHEV variant of i6
- Roewe i6 Max (2020–2024), compact sedan
  - Roewe ei6 Max (2020–2024), EV/PHEV variant of ei6
- Roewe 950/ e950 (2012–2019), mid-size sedan
- Roewe 850, mid-size sedan
- Roewe 750 (2006–2016), mid-size sedan
- Roewe 550/ e550 (2008–2014), mid-size sedan
- Roewe 360/360 Plus (2015–2018), compact sedan
- Roewe 350 (2010–2014), compact sedan
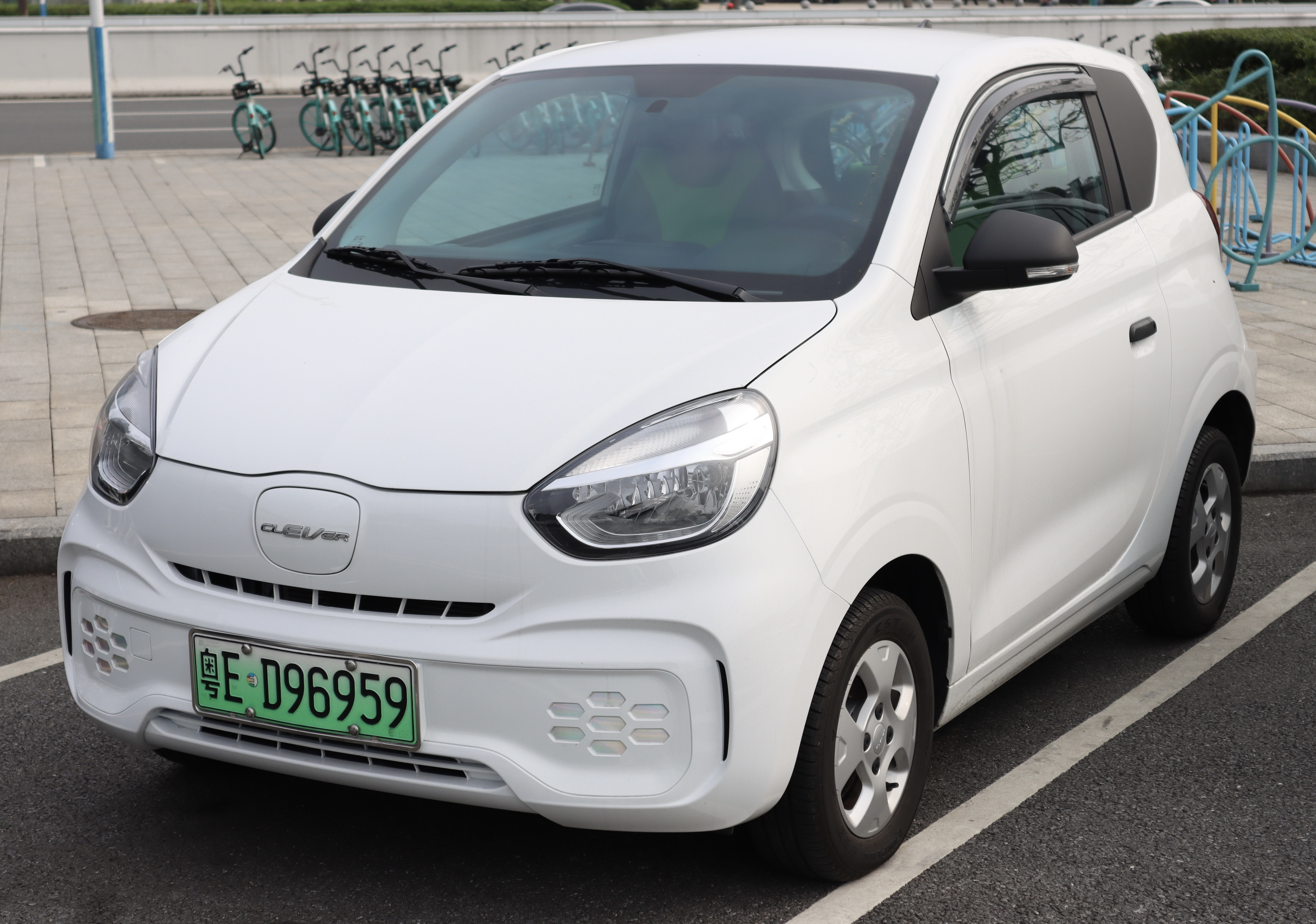
Roewe Clever

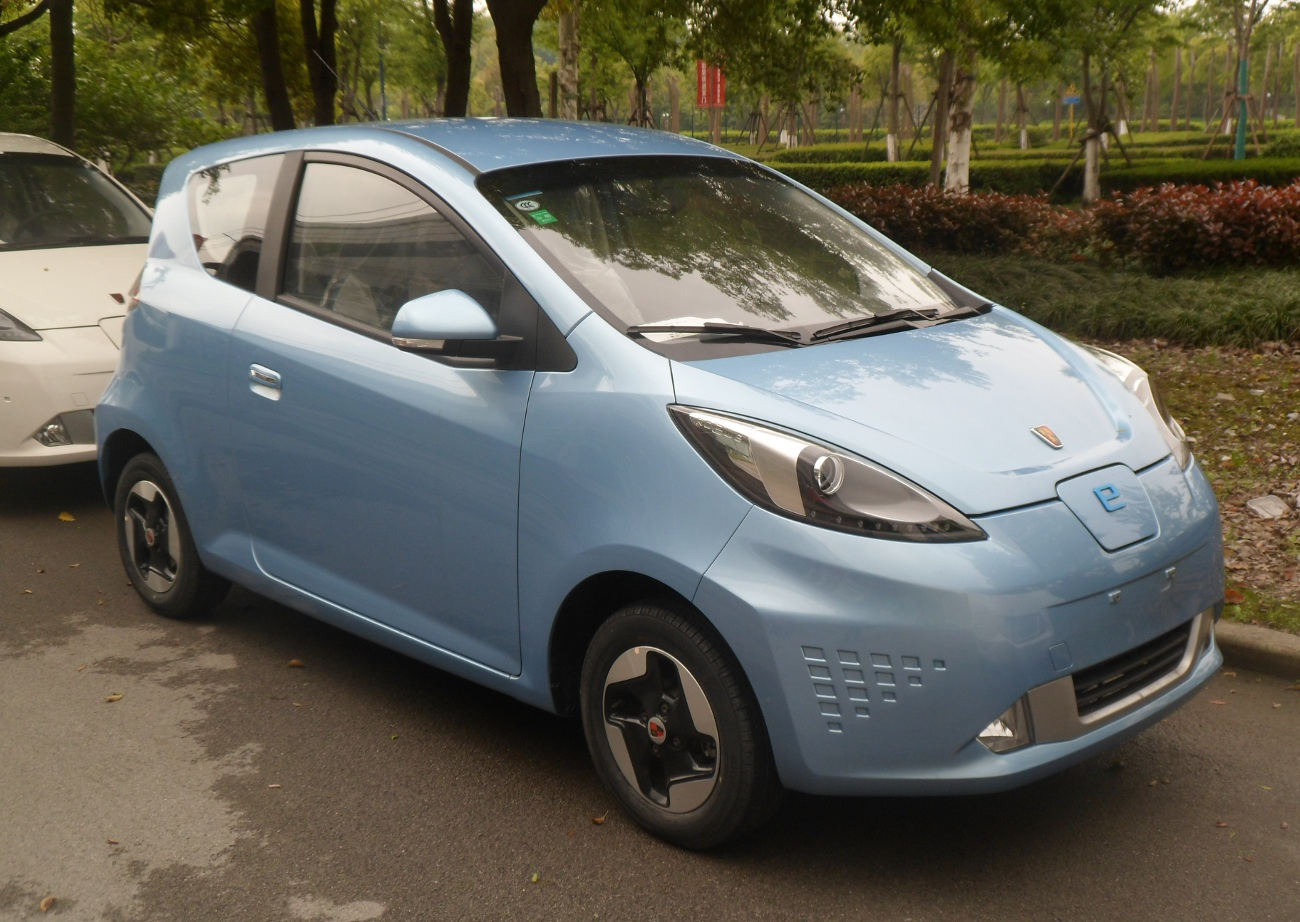
Roewe E50

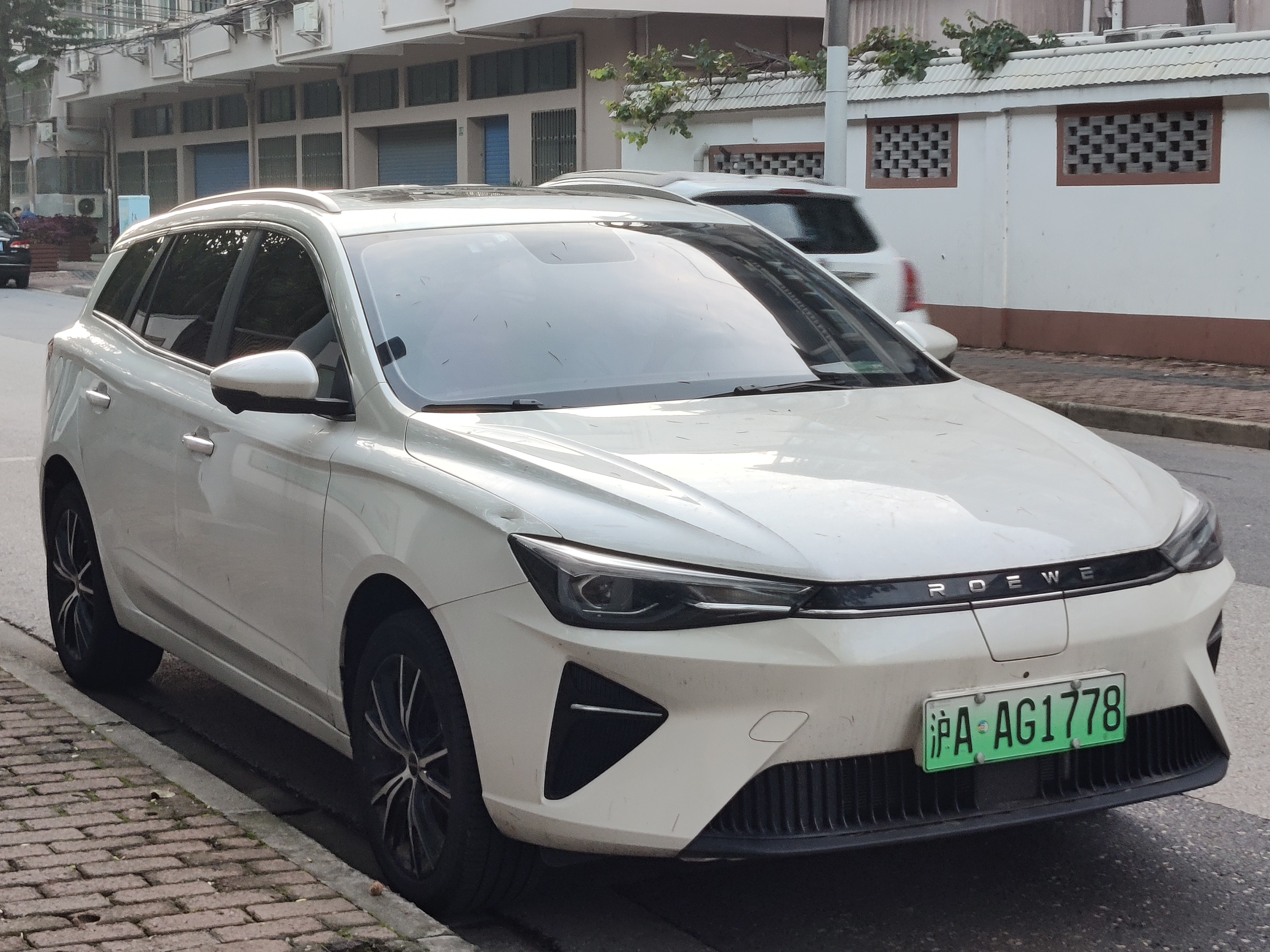
Roewe Ei5

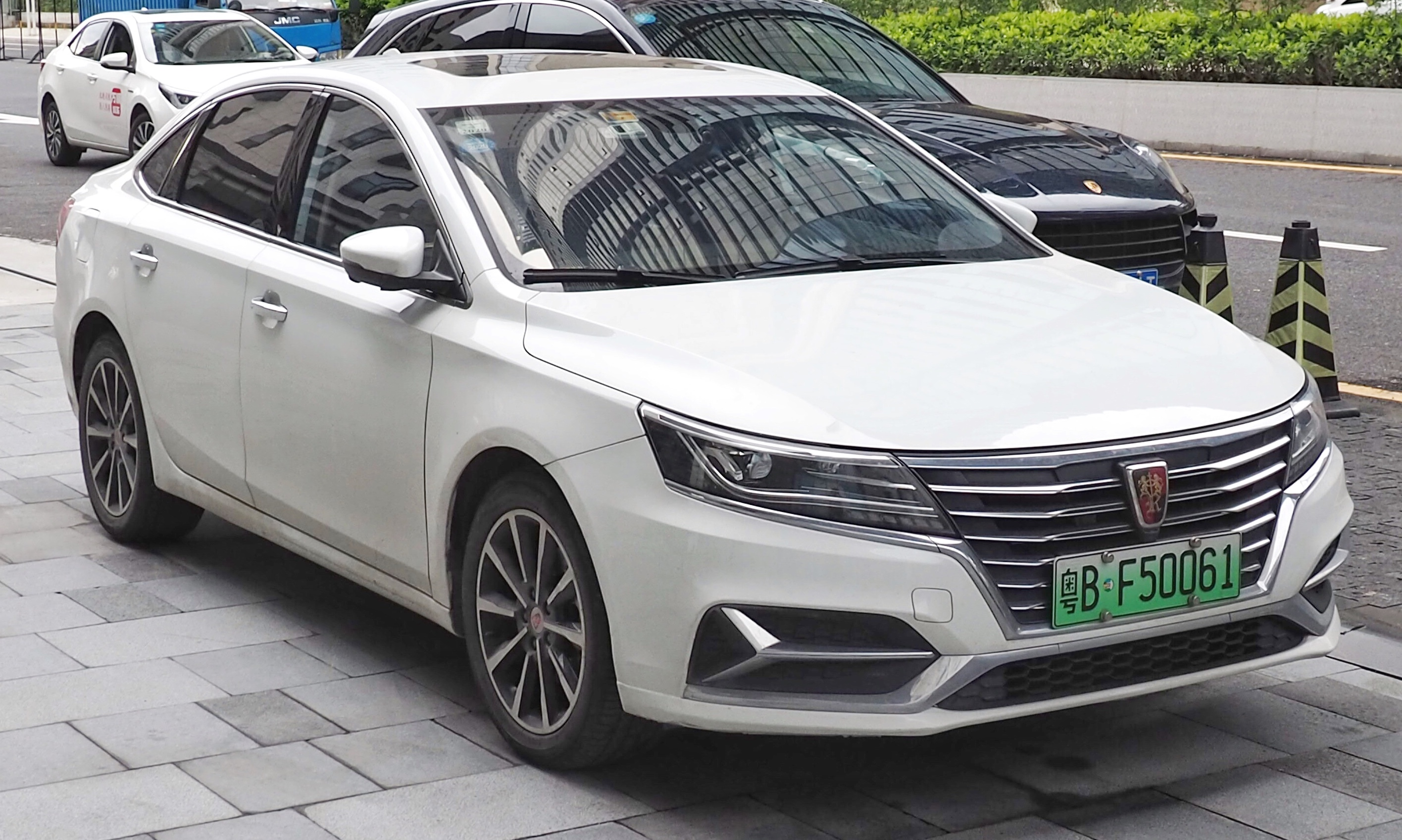
Roewe i6

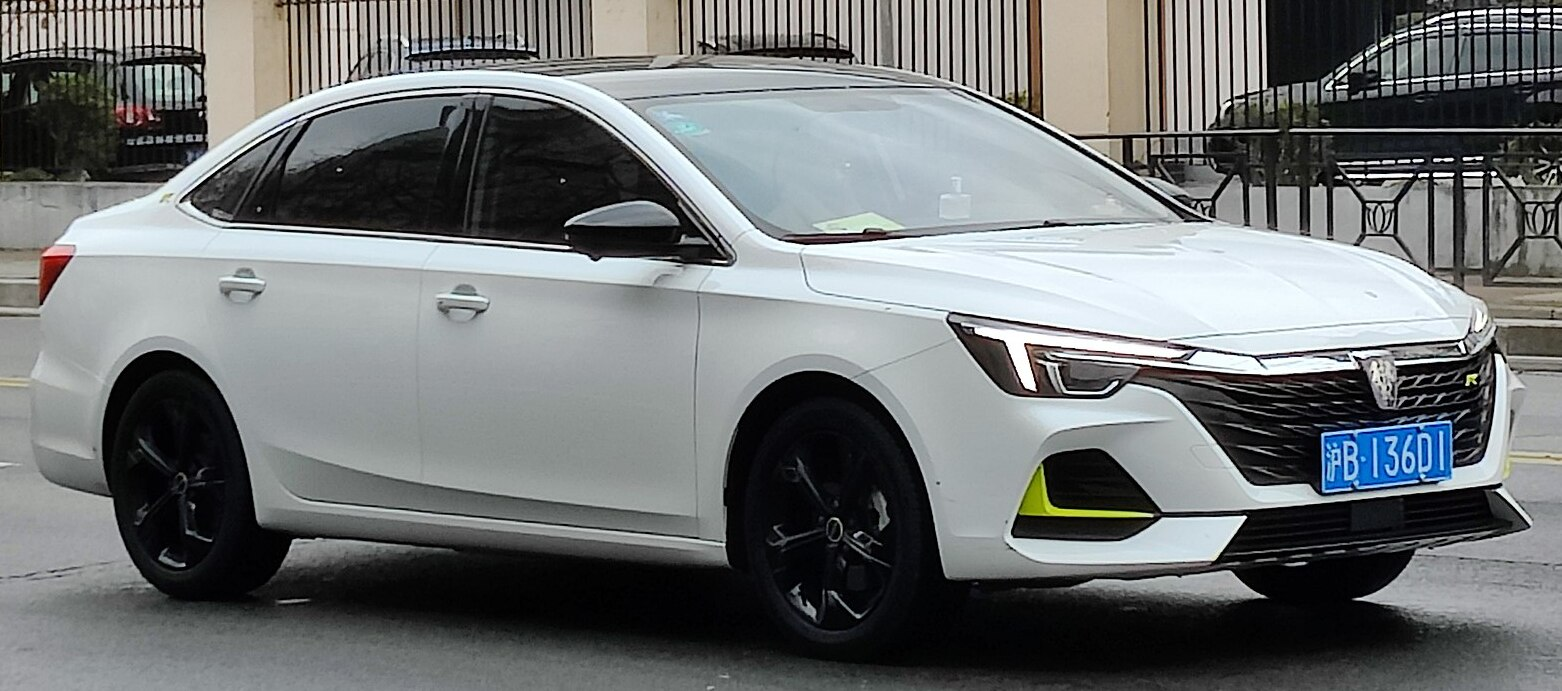
Roewe i6 Max

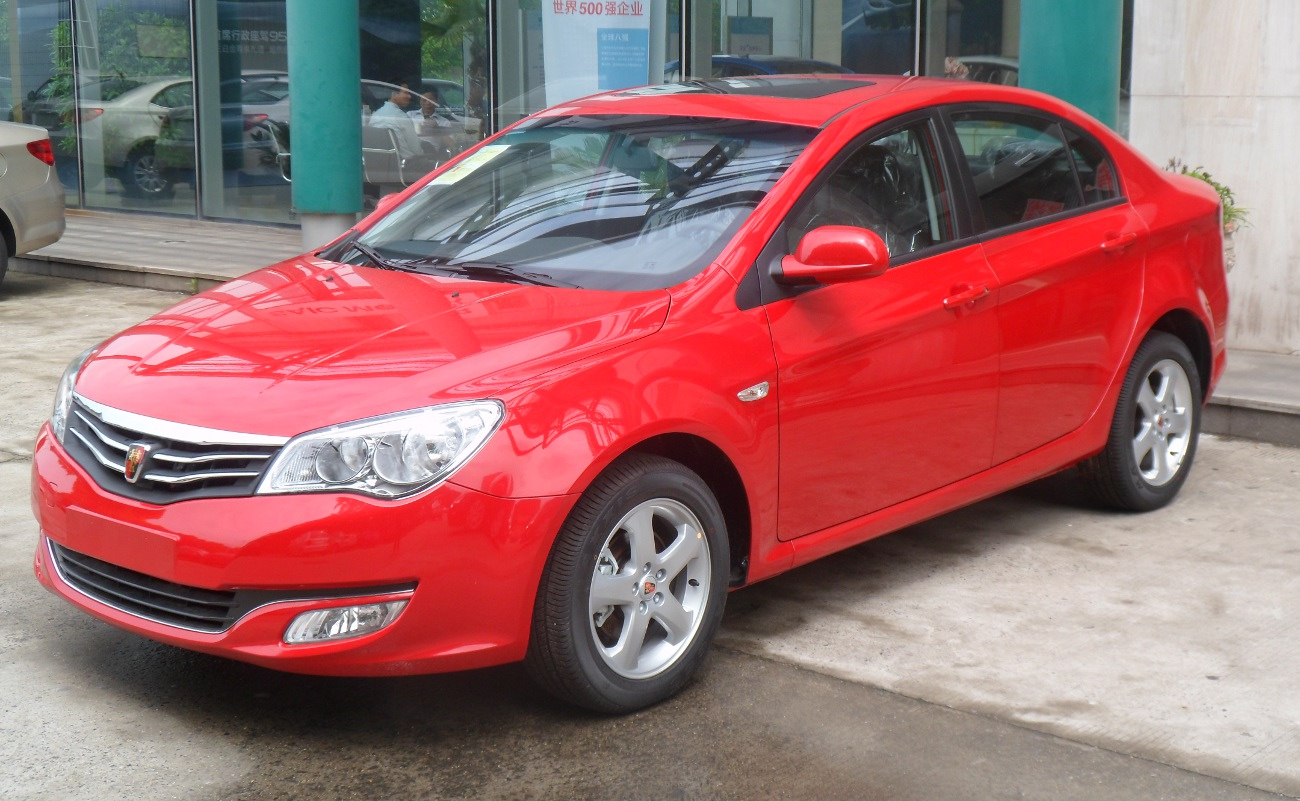
Roewe 350

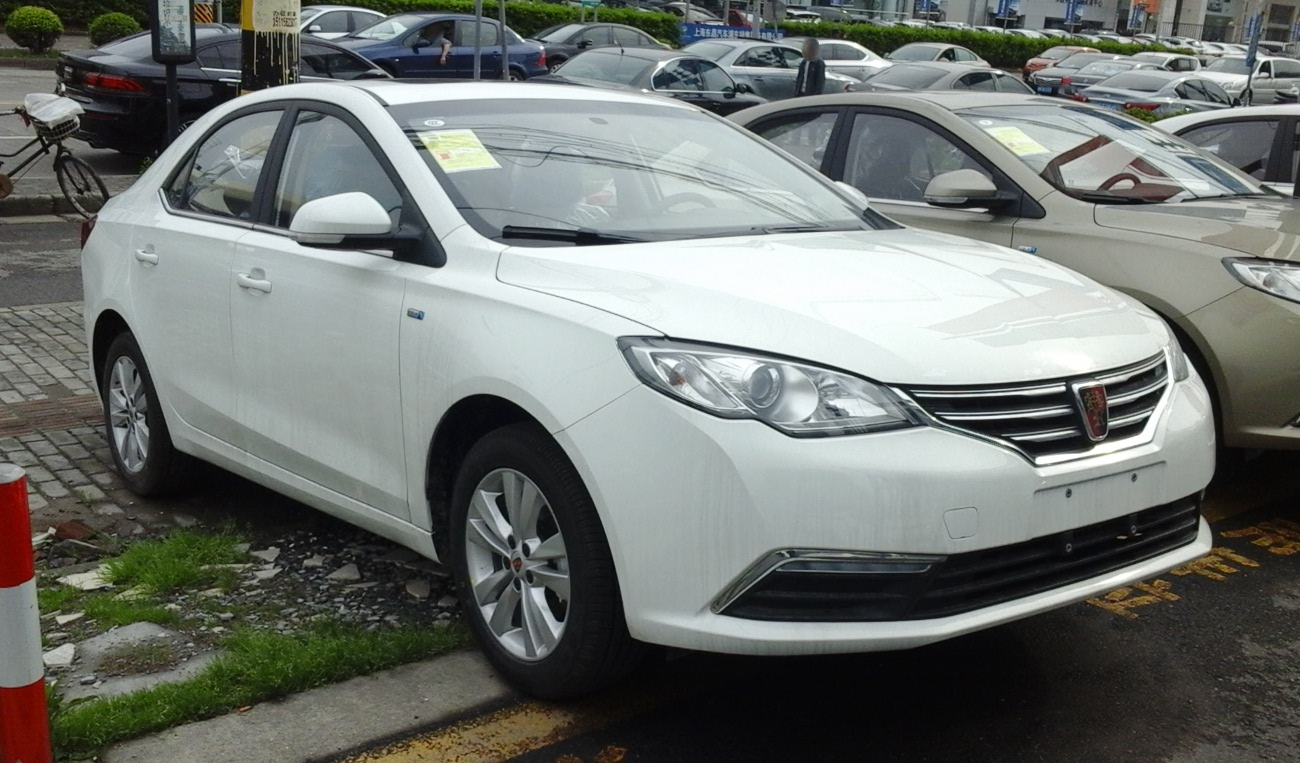
Roewe 360

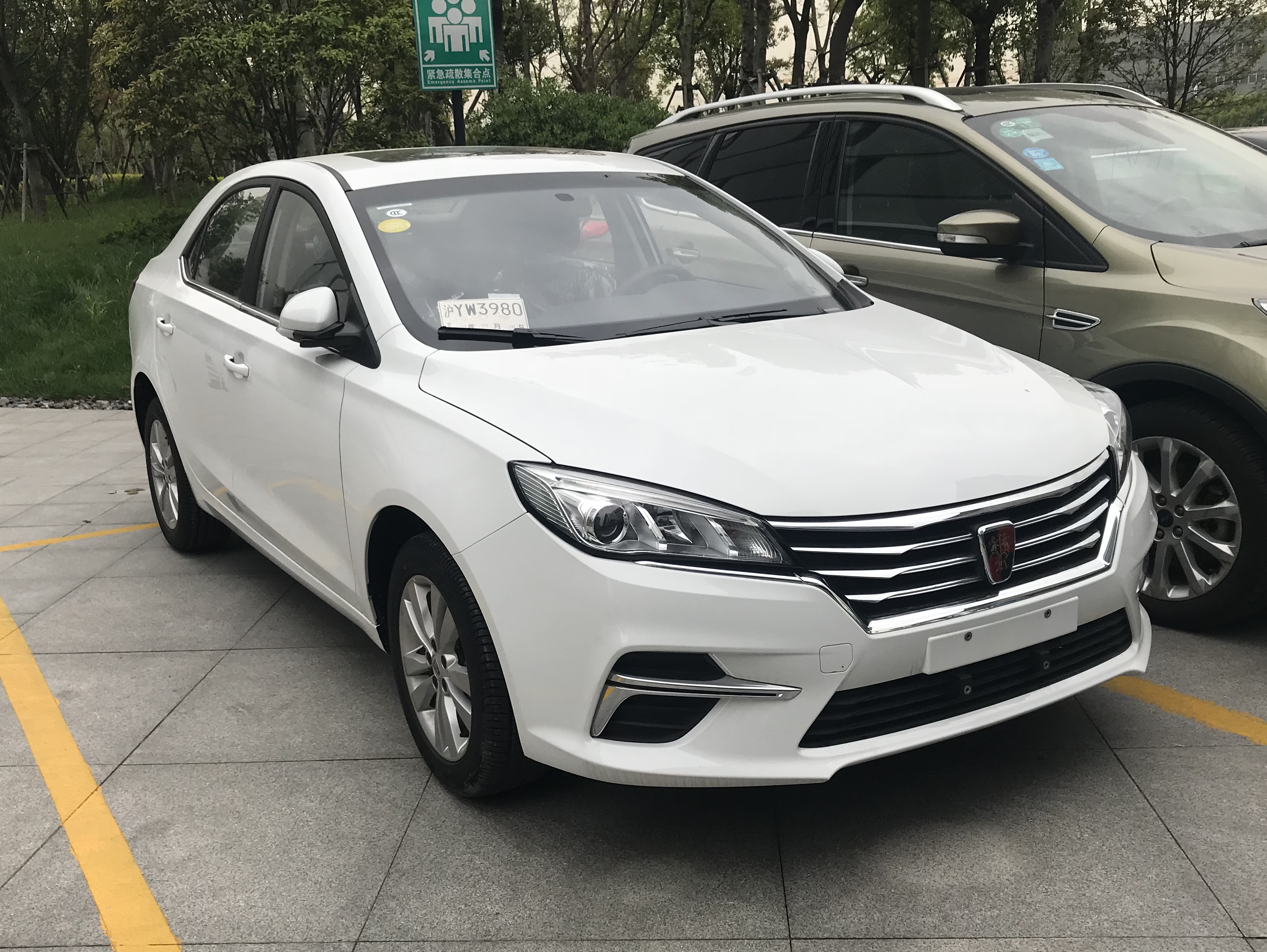
Roewe 360 Plus

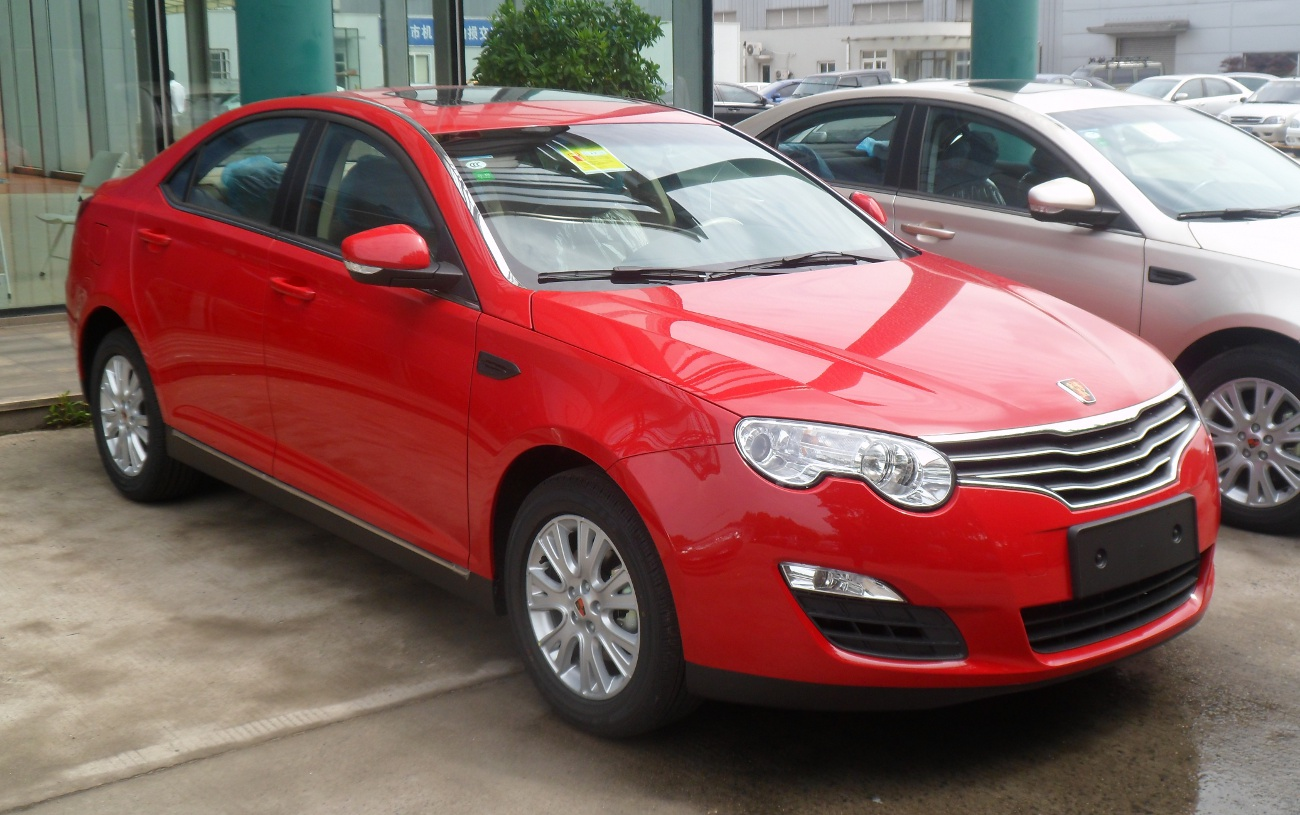
Roewe 550

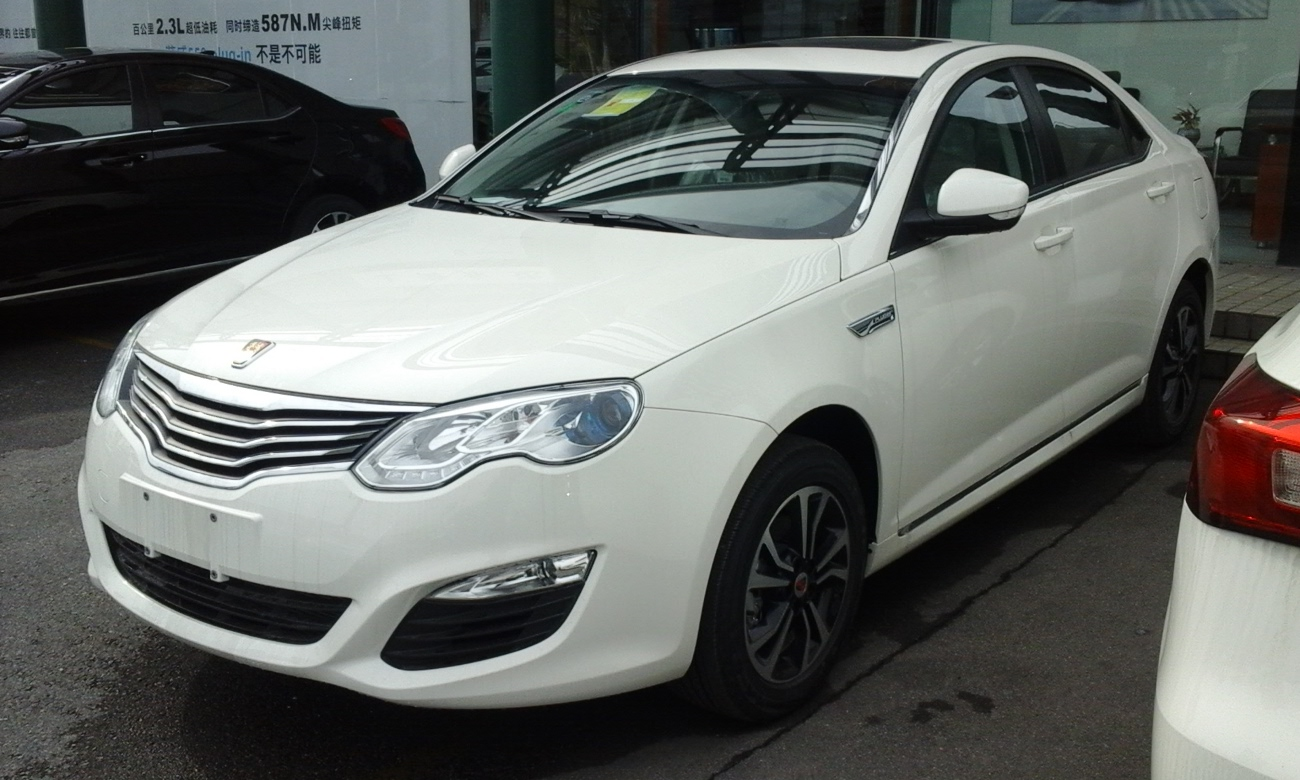
Roewe e550

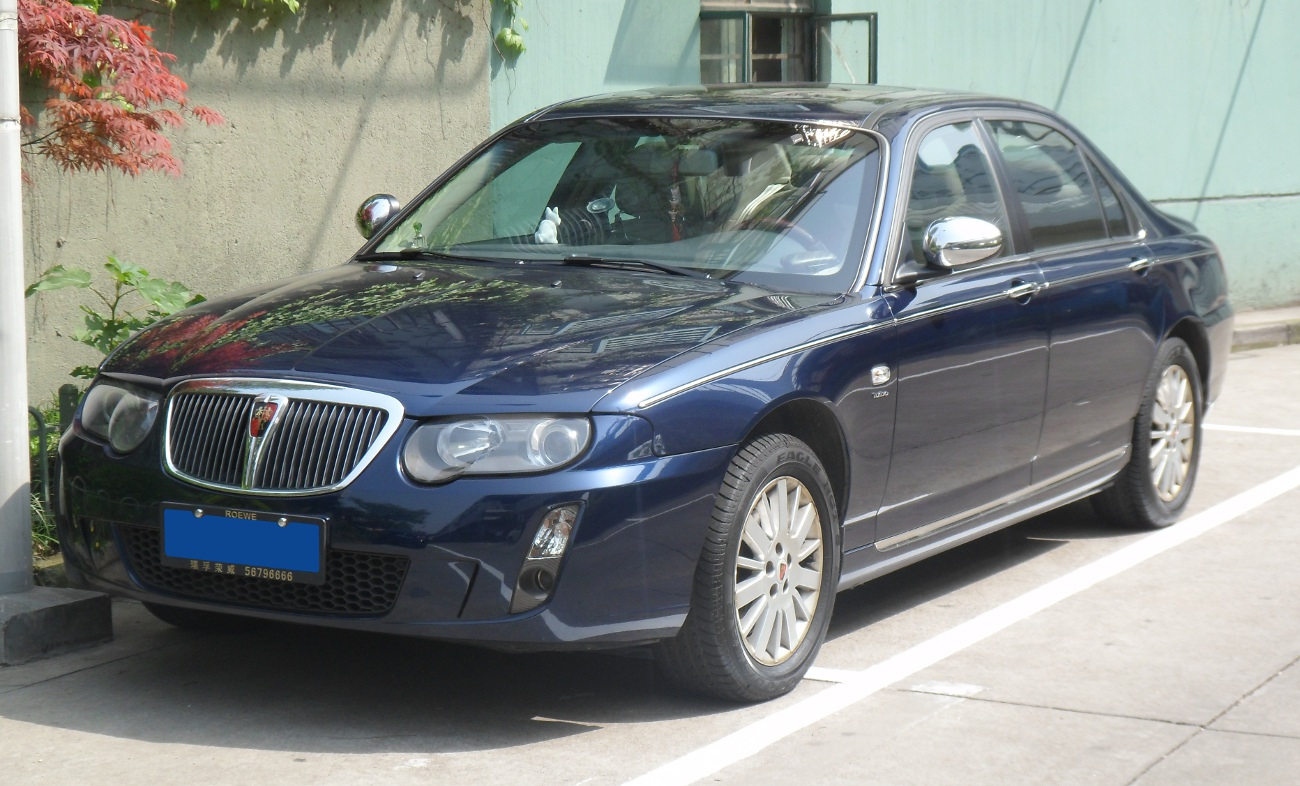
Roewe 750

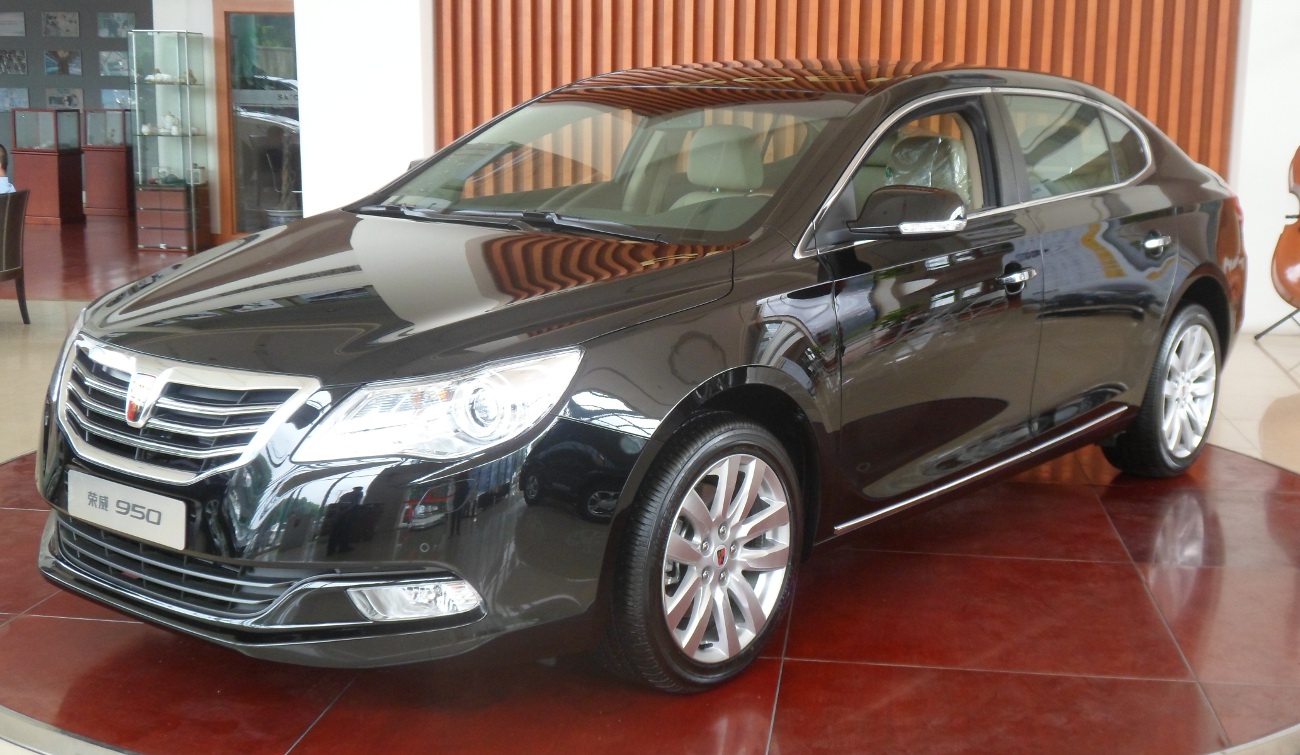
Roewe 950

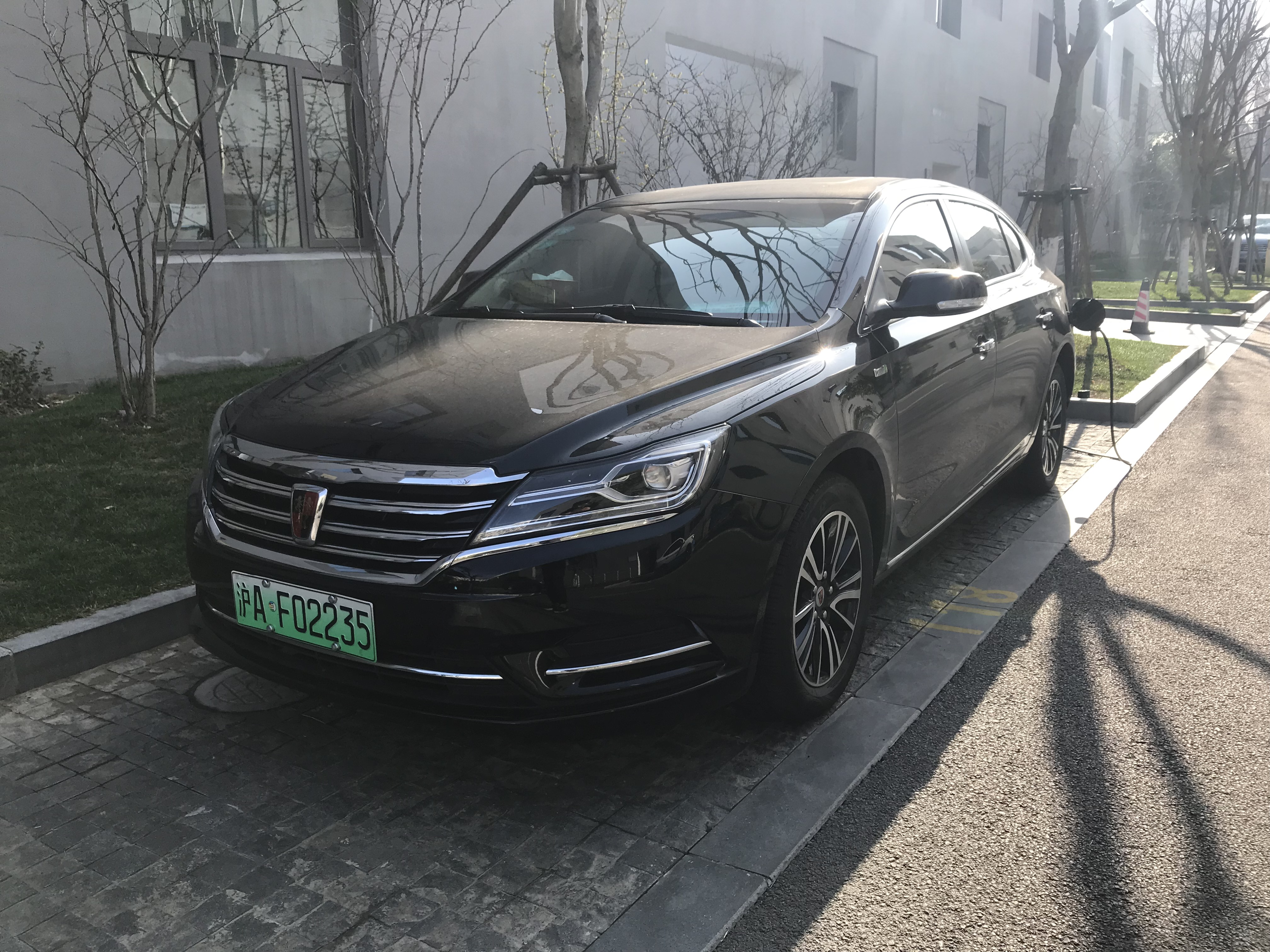
Roewe e950

==== SUV ====
- Roewe W5 (2011–2017), mid-size SUV
- Roewe Marvel X (2018–2021), mid-size SUV
- Roewe RX3 (2017–2023), subcompact SUV
- Roewe RX5 Max/ RX5 eMax (2019–2022), compact SUV
- Roewe RX5 (2016–2026), compact SUV
  - Roewe eRX5 (2017–2026), PHEV variant of RX5
  - Roewe D5X (2024–2026), PHEV variant of RX5
- Roewe RX8 (2018–2023), mid-size SUV
- Roewe RX9 (2023–2025), mid-size SUV
- Roewe Jing (2022–2023), compact coupe SUV
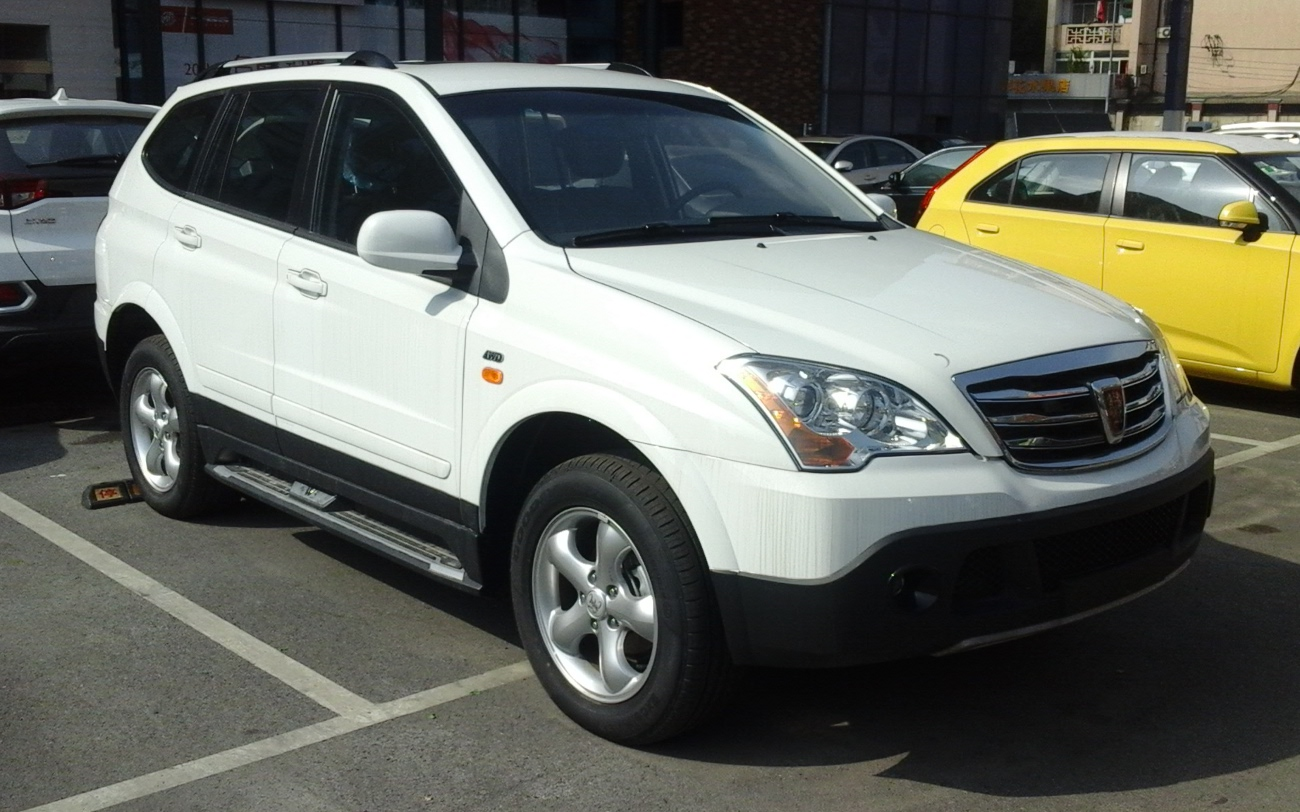
Roewe W5

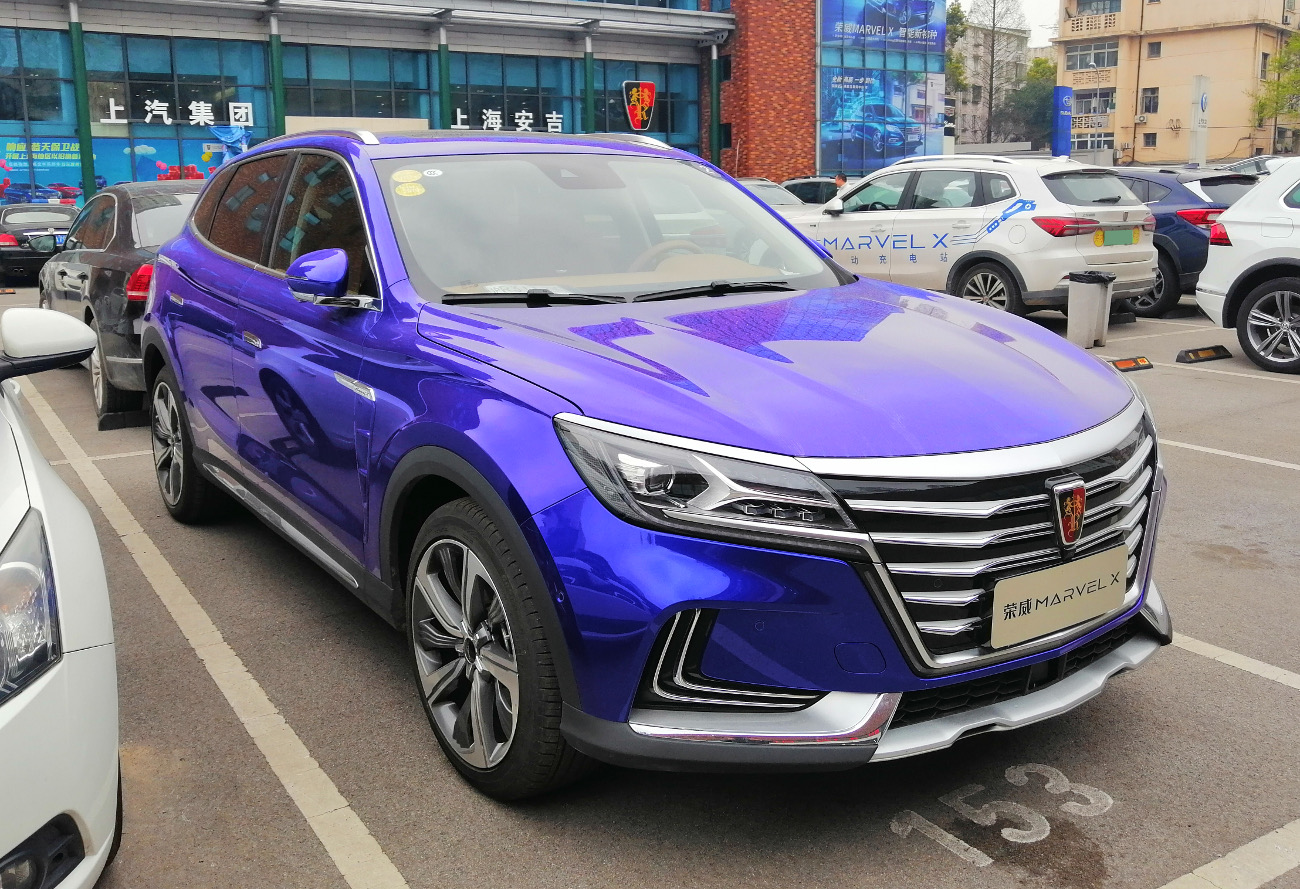
Roewe Marvel X

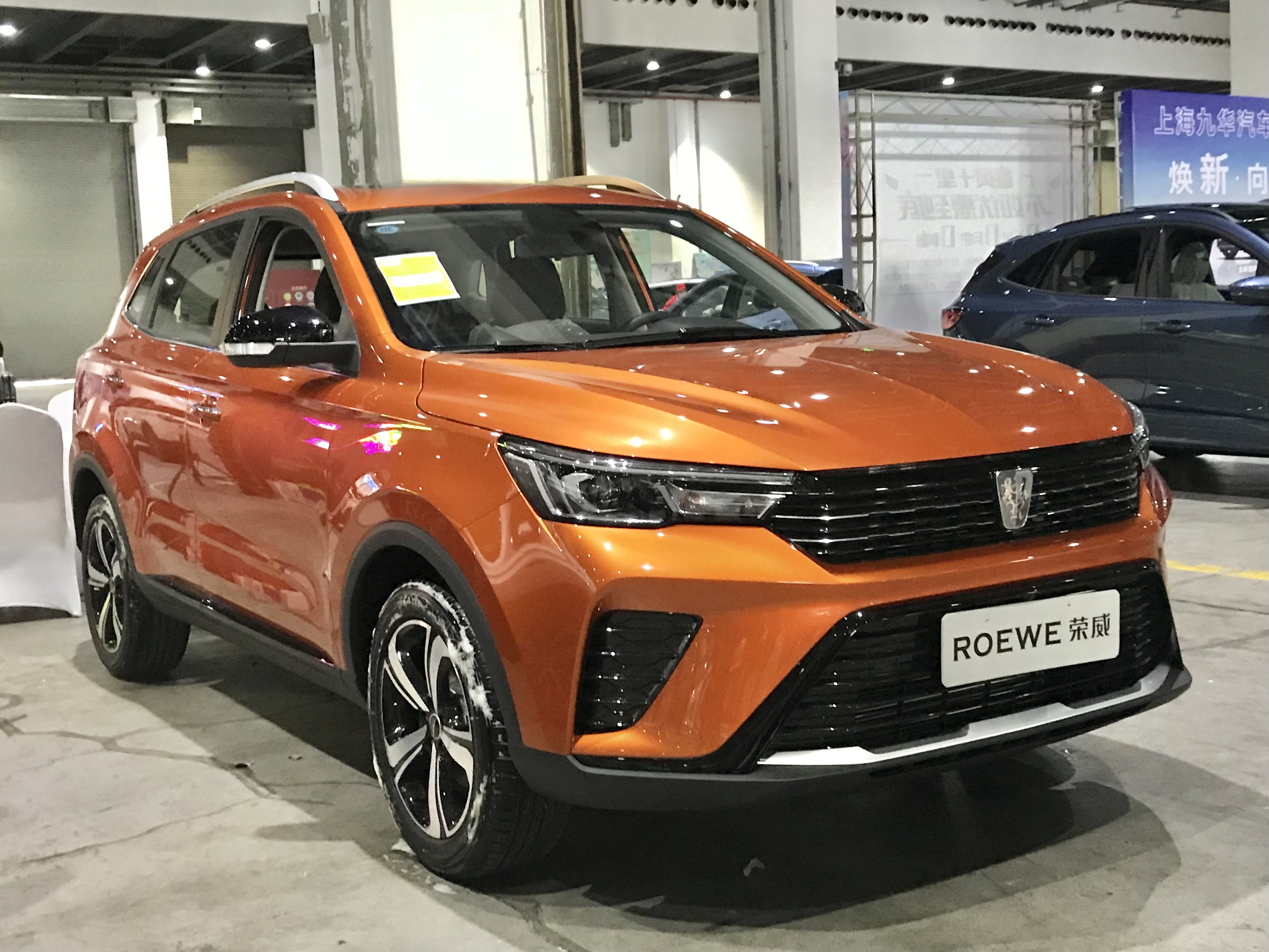
Roewe RX3

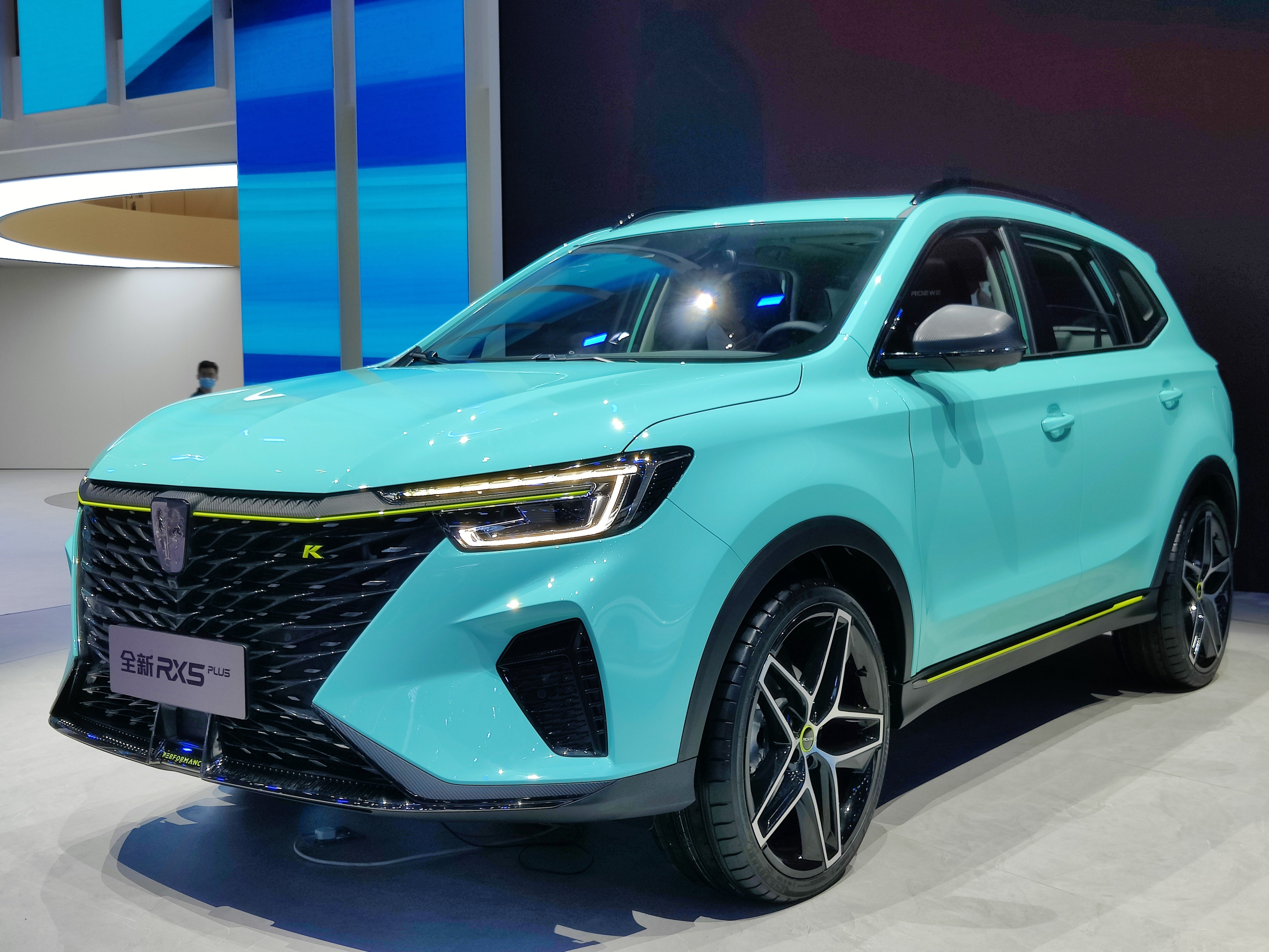
Roewe RX5 Plus

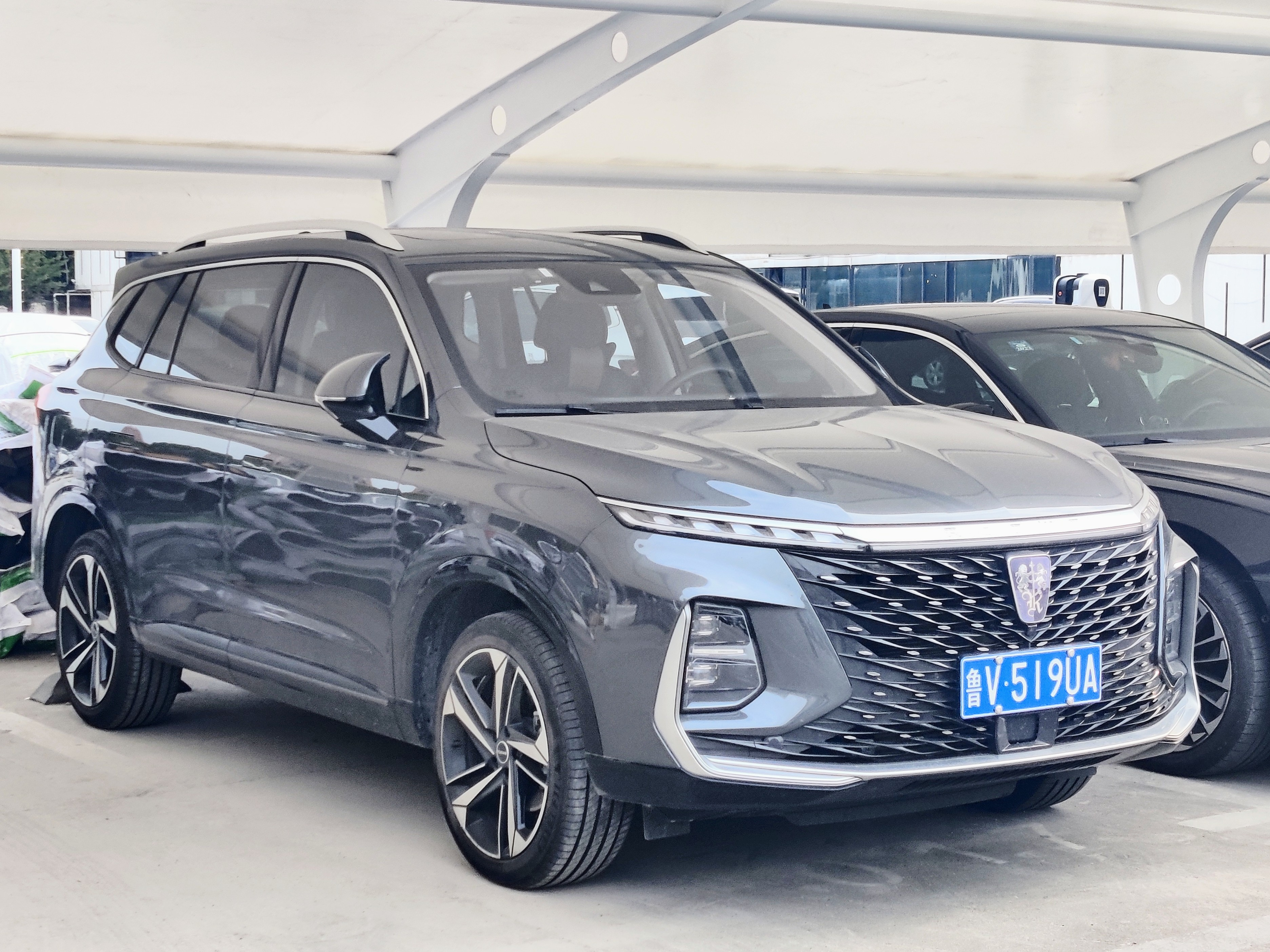
Roewe RX5 Max

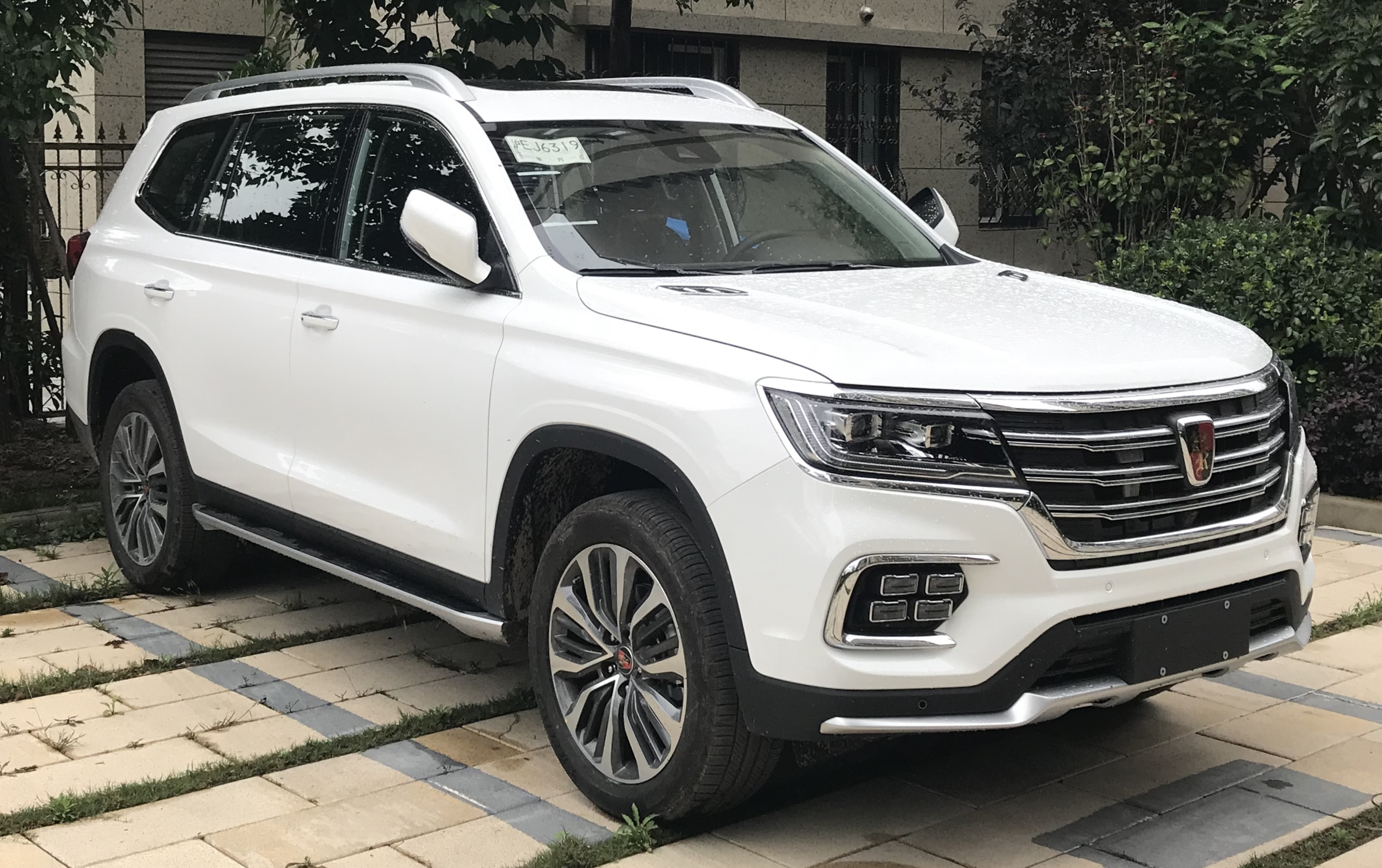
Roewe RX8

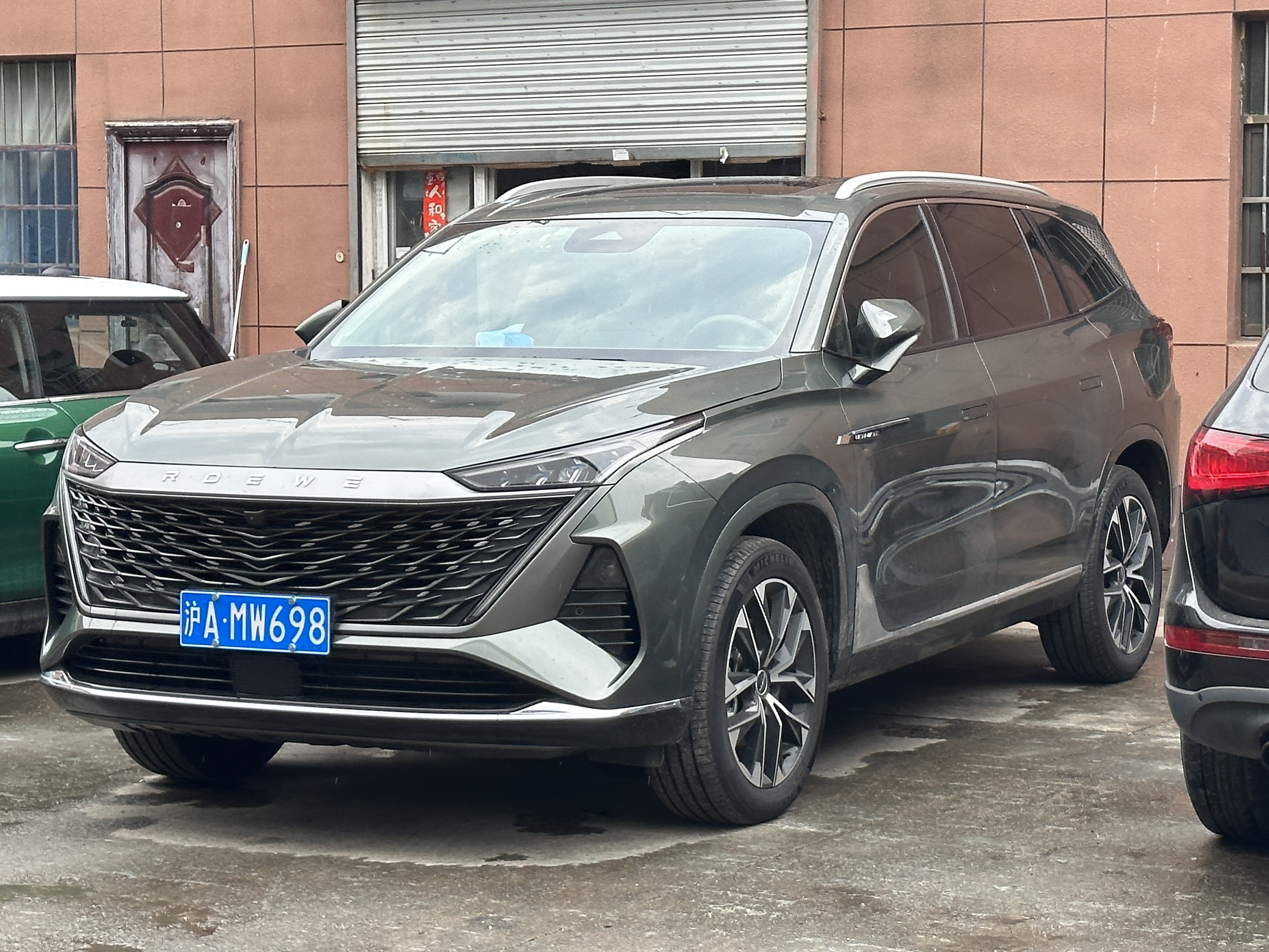
Roewe RX9

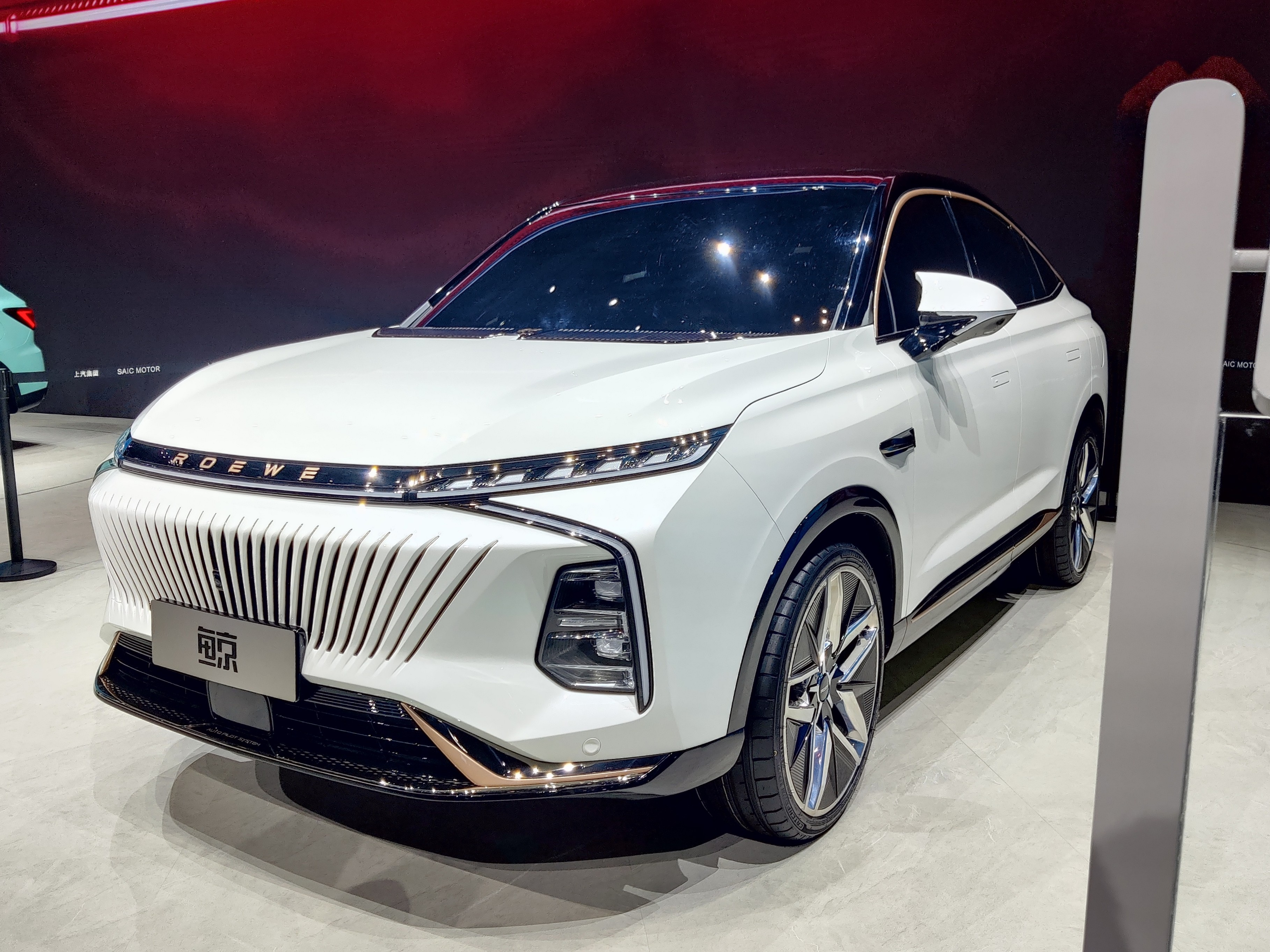
Roewe Jing

=== Concepts ===
- Roewe N1 Concept
- Roewe E1 Concept
- Roewe Vision-R
- Roewe Vision-E
- Roewe Vision-i
- Roewe Vision-iM
- Roewe Max Concept
- Roewe R-Aura
- Roewe iM8 Concept
- Roewe Whale Concept
- Roewe Pearl Concept
- Roewe Jiayue 06 Concept
- Roewe Jiayue 07 Concept
- Roewe Jiayue 09 Concept
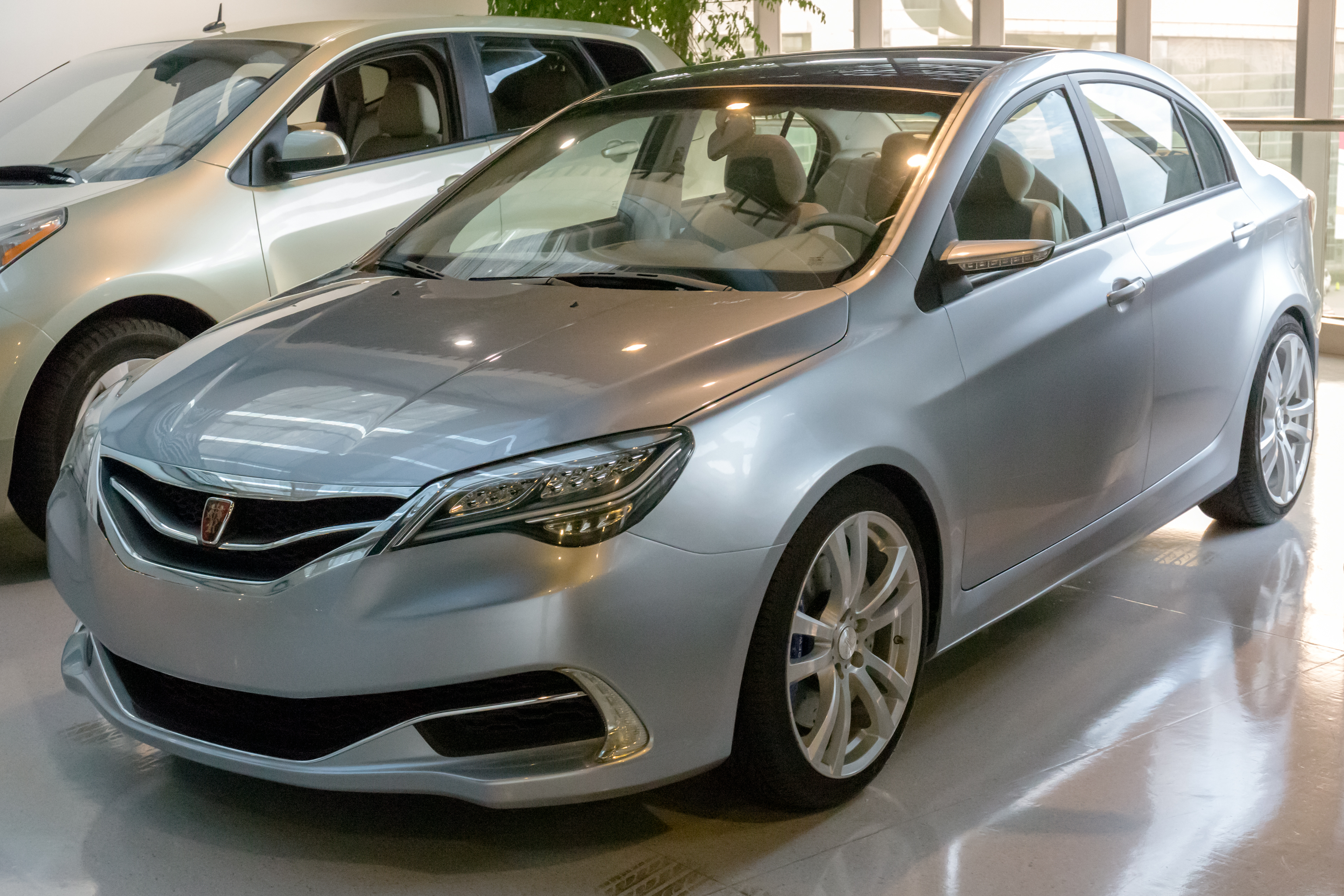
Roewe N1 Concept

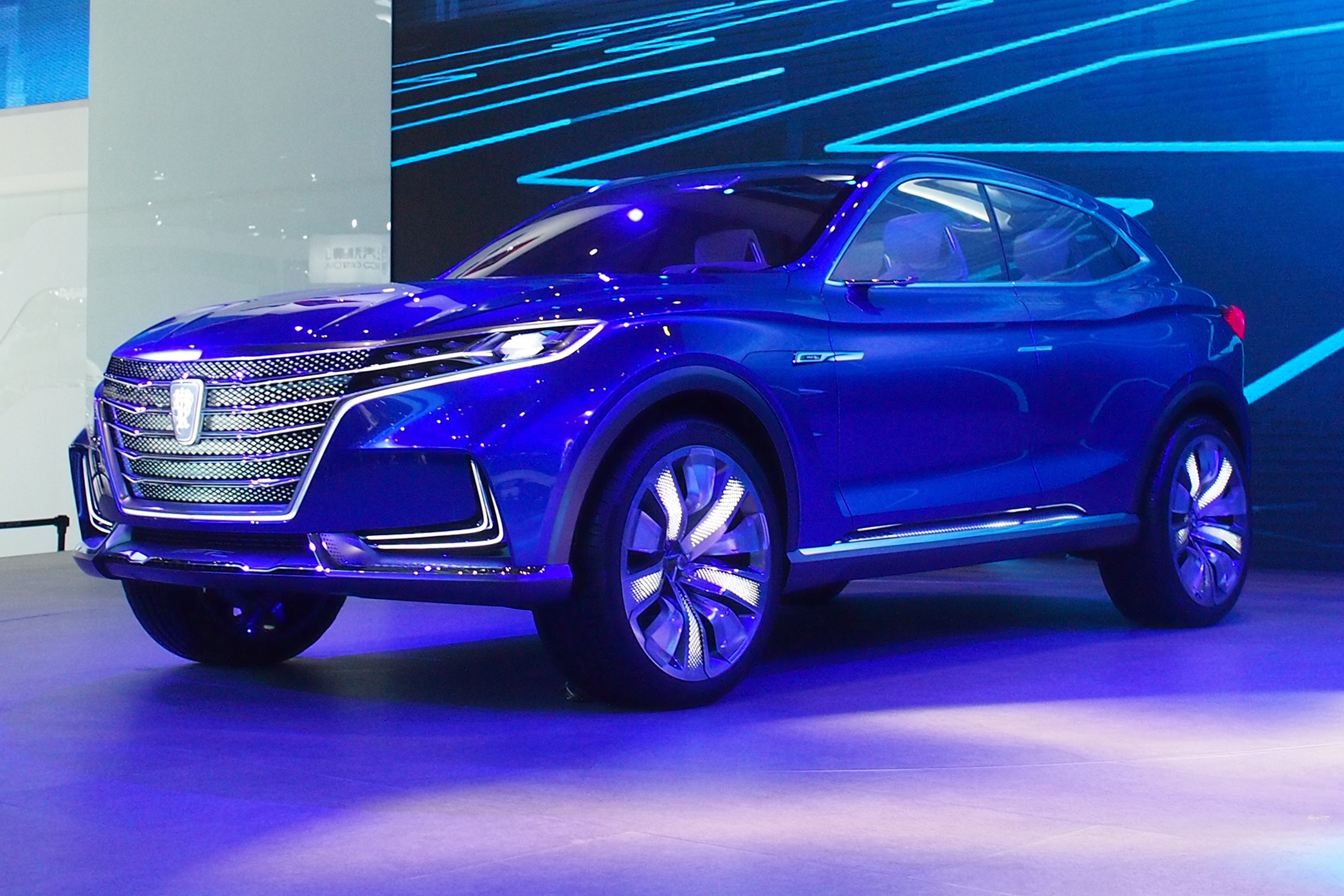
Roewe Vision-E Concept

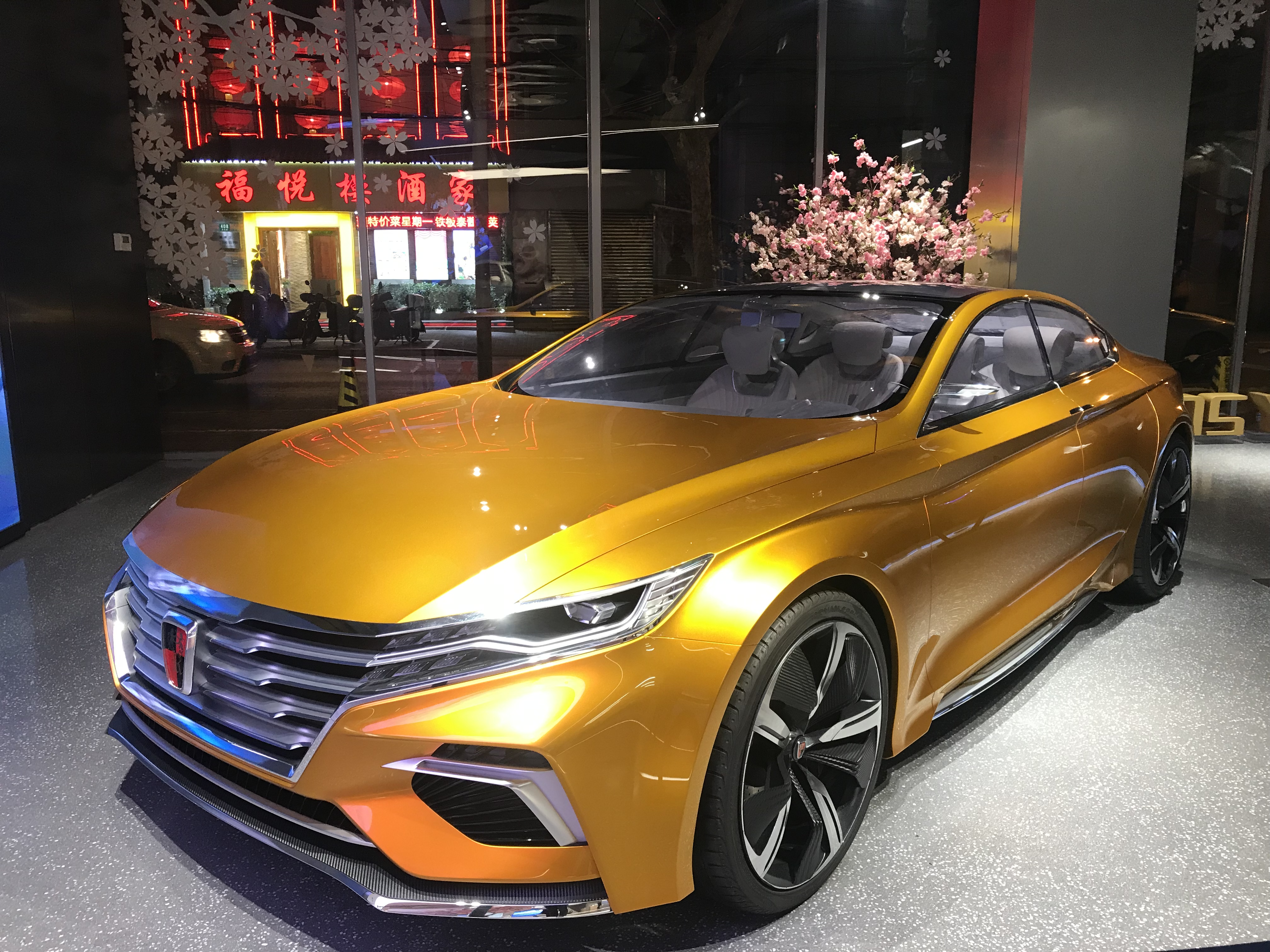
Roewe Vision-R Concept

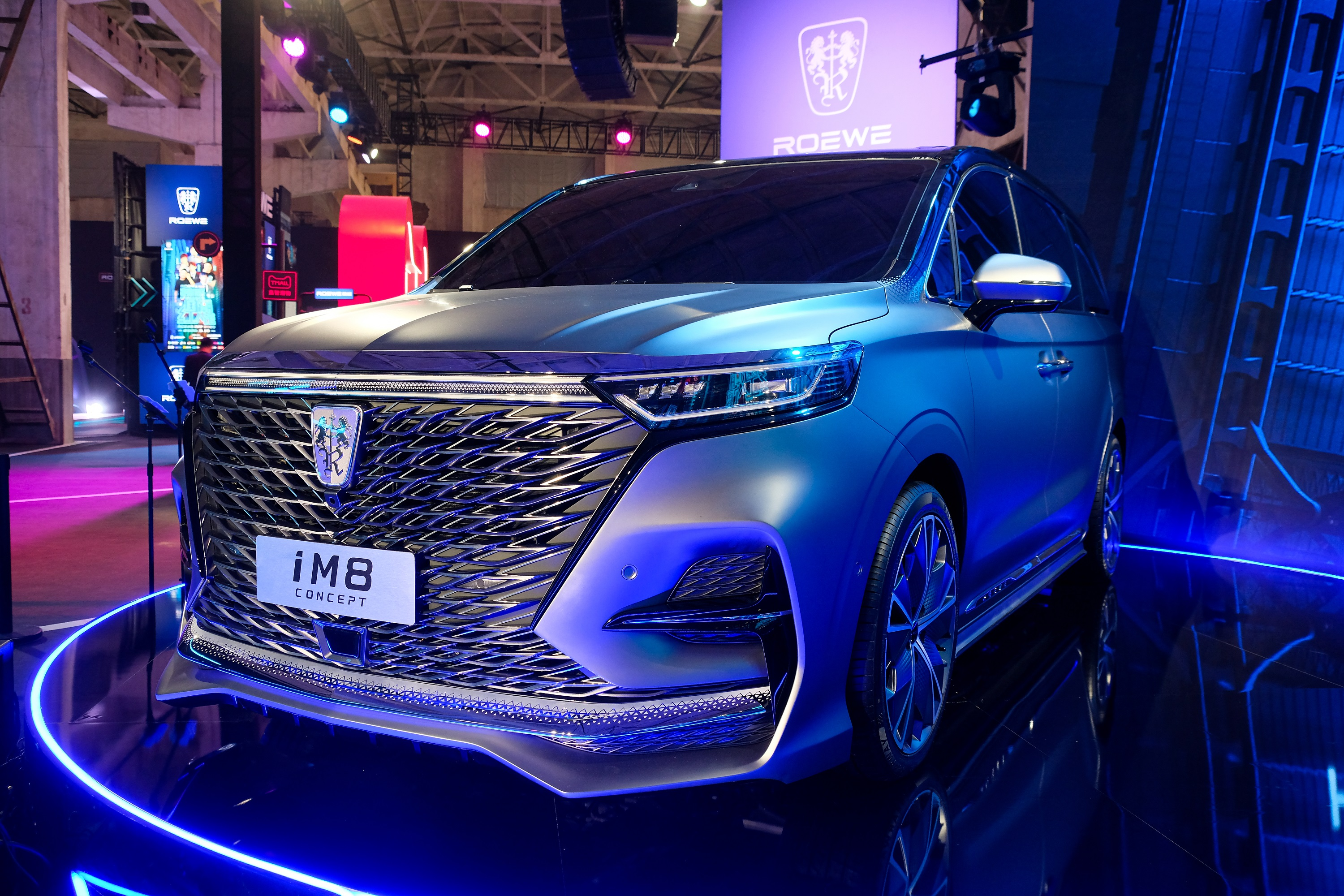
Roewe iM8 Concept

== Sales ==
A total of 155,336 Roewe vehicles were sold in China in 2013, making it the 29th largest-selling car brand in the country in that year (and the 13th largest-selling Chinese brand).

=== Exports ===
Outside of China, Roewe-derived models are currently sold under the MG marque.

In 2008, the Roewe 550 and 750 were launched in Chile under the names MG 550 and MG 750, respectively. The smaller MG 350 and sporty MG 6 were displayed at the eleventh Santiago Motor Show in October 2010.

European sales first began in Belarus, with an MG-badged version of the 550. British car magazine Autocar tested the Roewe 350 in 2010 suggesting that the model would be built and sold in the UK, but Roewe denied this. Nonetheless, as of April 2011 SAIC's MG6 (a reworked Roewe 550) commenced assembly at the old MG Rover plant in Longbridge. The European market cars feature certain improvements over its Chinese siblings, meeting Euro V rather than Euro IV emissions standards.
