= Roewe W5 =

Roewe W5 (IS12)
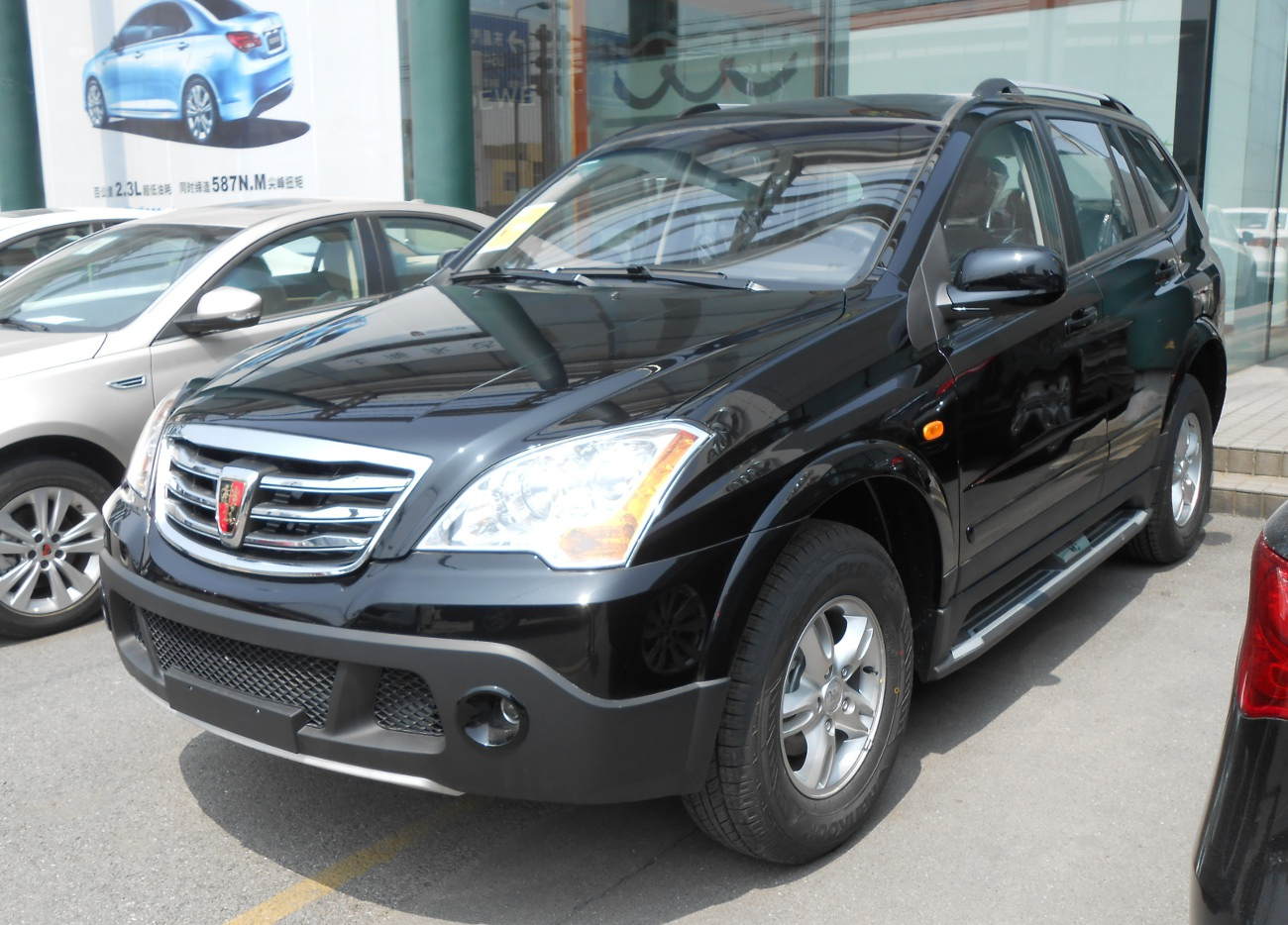
- Roewe W5 (China; facelift model)

Overview
- Manufacturer: SAIC Motor
- Production: 2011–2017
- Model years: 2012–2017

Body and chassis
- Class: Mid-size luxury crossover SUV
- Body style: 5-door SUV
- Layout: front engine, rear-wheel drive front engine, four-wheel drive
- Related: SsangYong Kyron

Powertrain
- Engine: 1.8 L Kavachi turbo I4; 3.2 L M104.99x I6
- Transmission: 5-speed manual; 5-speed 5G Tronic automatic; 6-speed automatic

Dimensions
- Wheelbase: 2,740 mm (107.9 in)
- Length: 4,676 mm (184.1 in)
- Width: 1,888 mm (74.3 in)
- Height: 1,765 mm (69.5 in)

Chronology
- Successor: Roewe RX5 (FWD/4WD); Roewe RX8 (RWD/4WD)

The Roewe W5 is a mid-size luxury crossover SUV manufactured by Roewe in China. It was unveiled at the 2011 Auto Shanghai Exhibition.

== Overview ==
The Roewe W5 is based on the SsangYong Kyron and sold exclusively in China. It features a 1.8-litre, four-cylinder turbo engine with 119 kW (162 PS; 160 bhp) that is also used in the Roewe 750 and 550. The car is also available in four-wheel drive format with a 3.2-litre inline-six Mercedes-Benz M104 engine producing 162 kW (220 PS; 217 bhp).

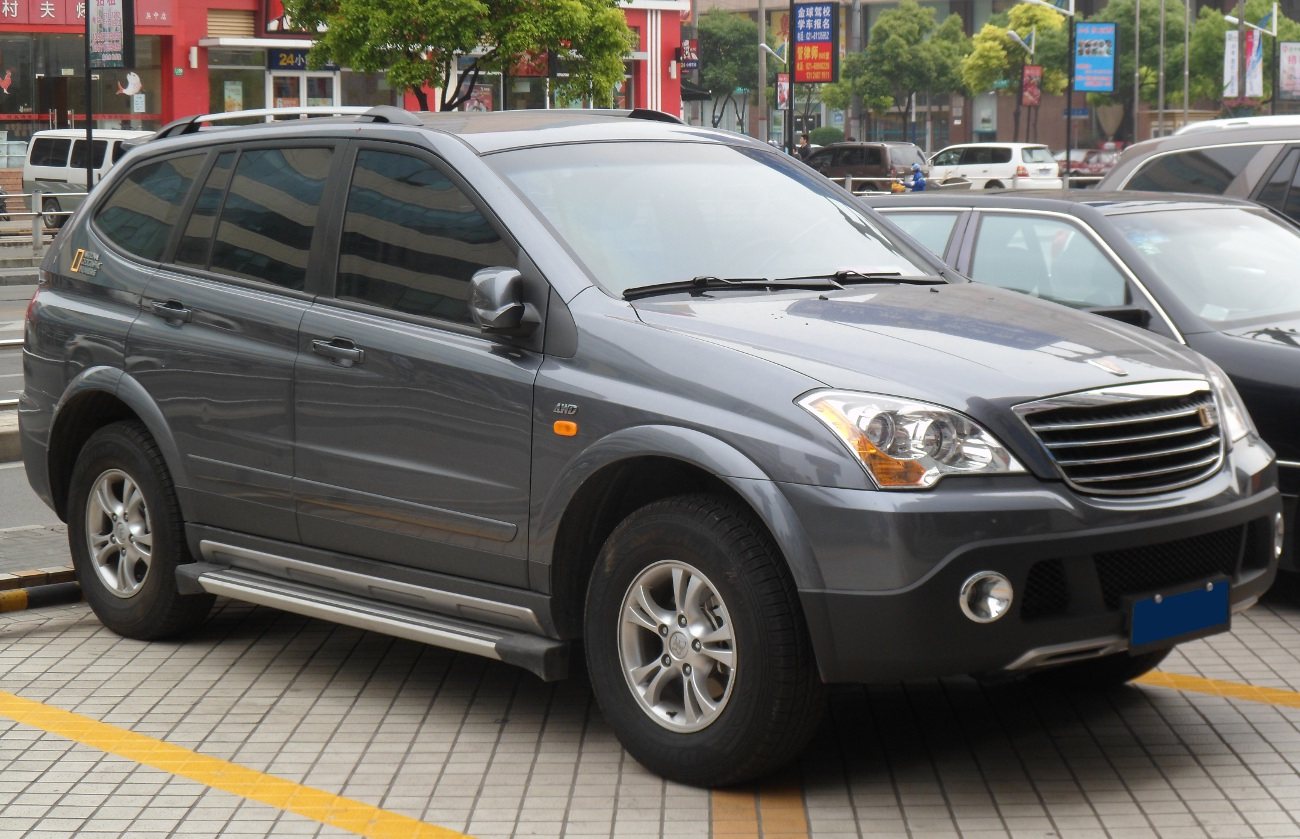
Pre-facelift Roewe W5 (front)

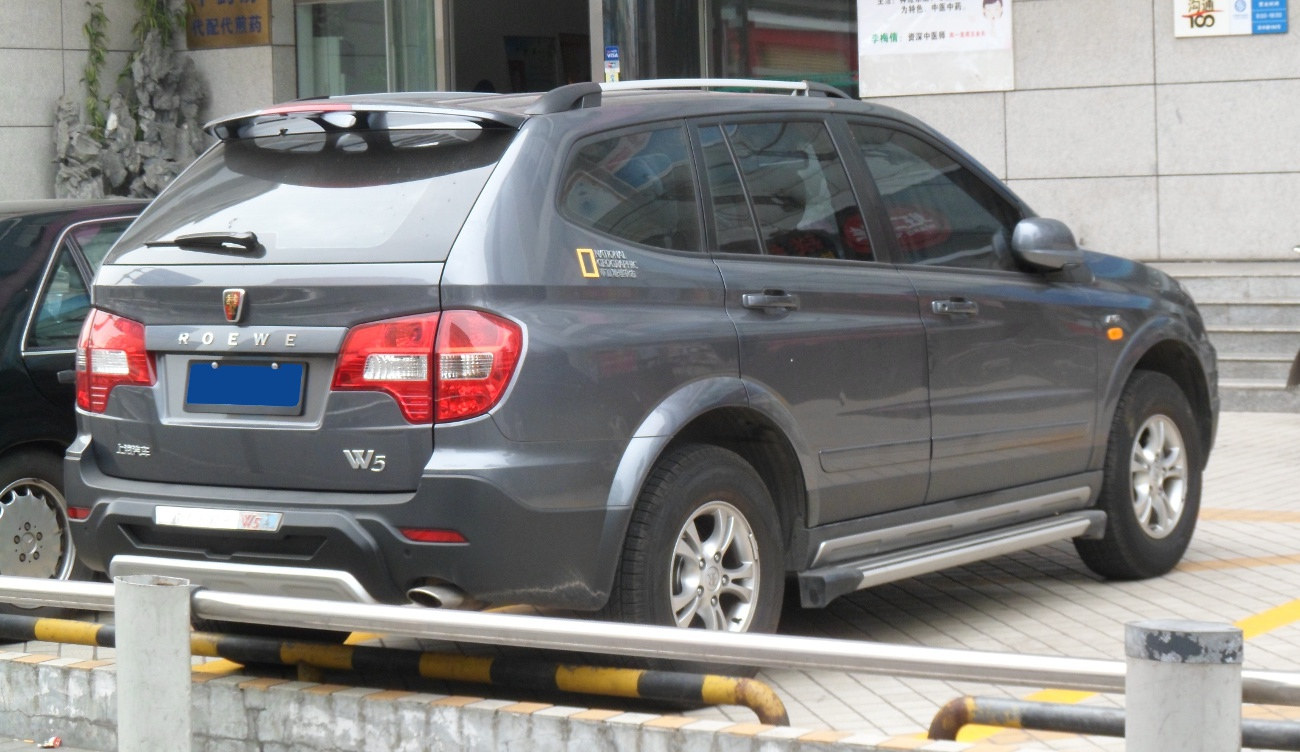
Pre-facelift Roewe W5 (rear)
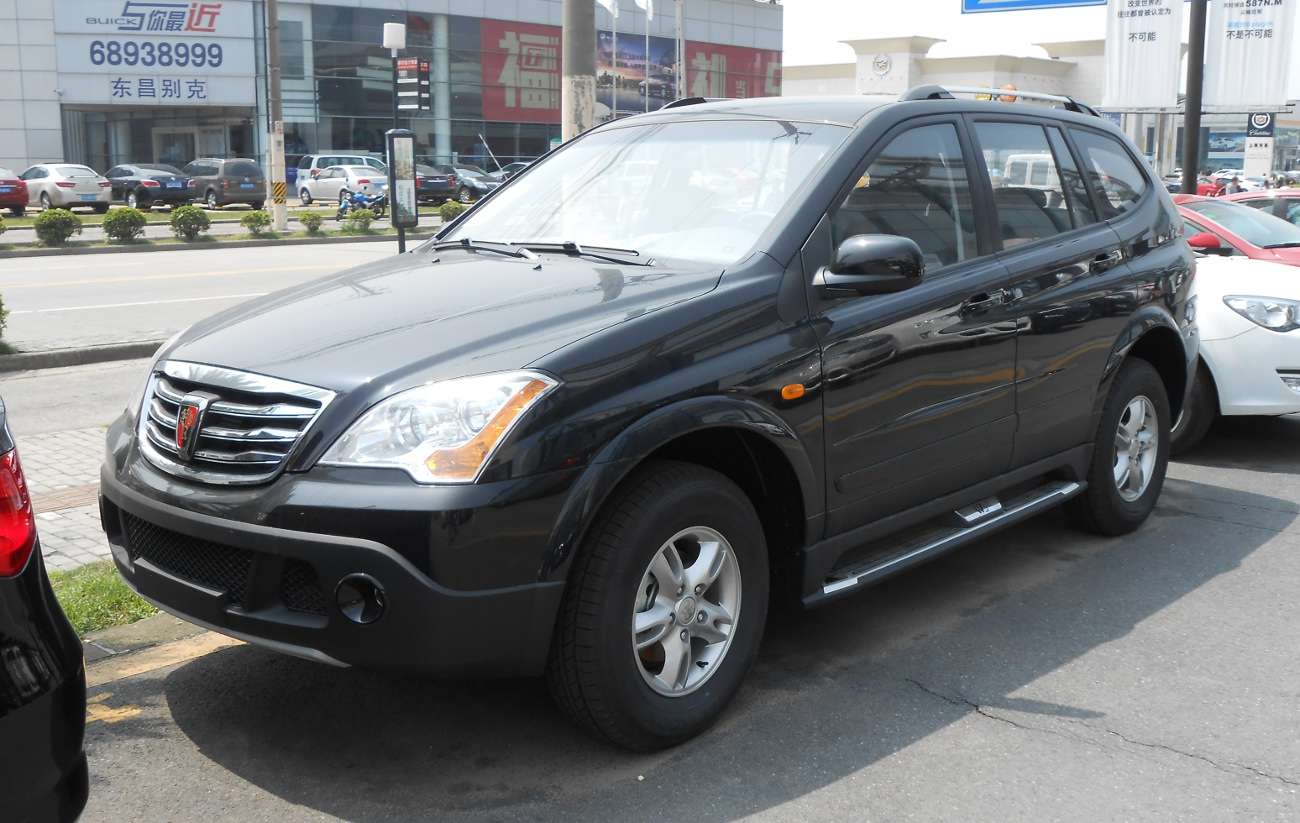
Roewe W5 facelift (front)

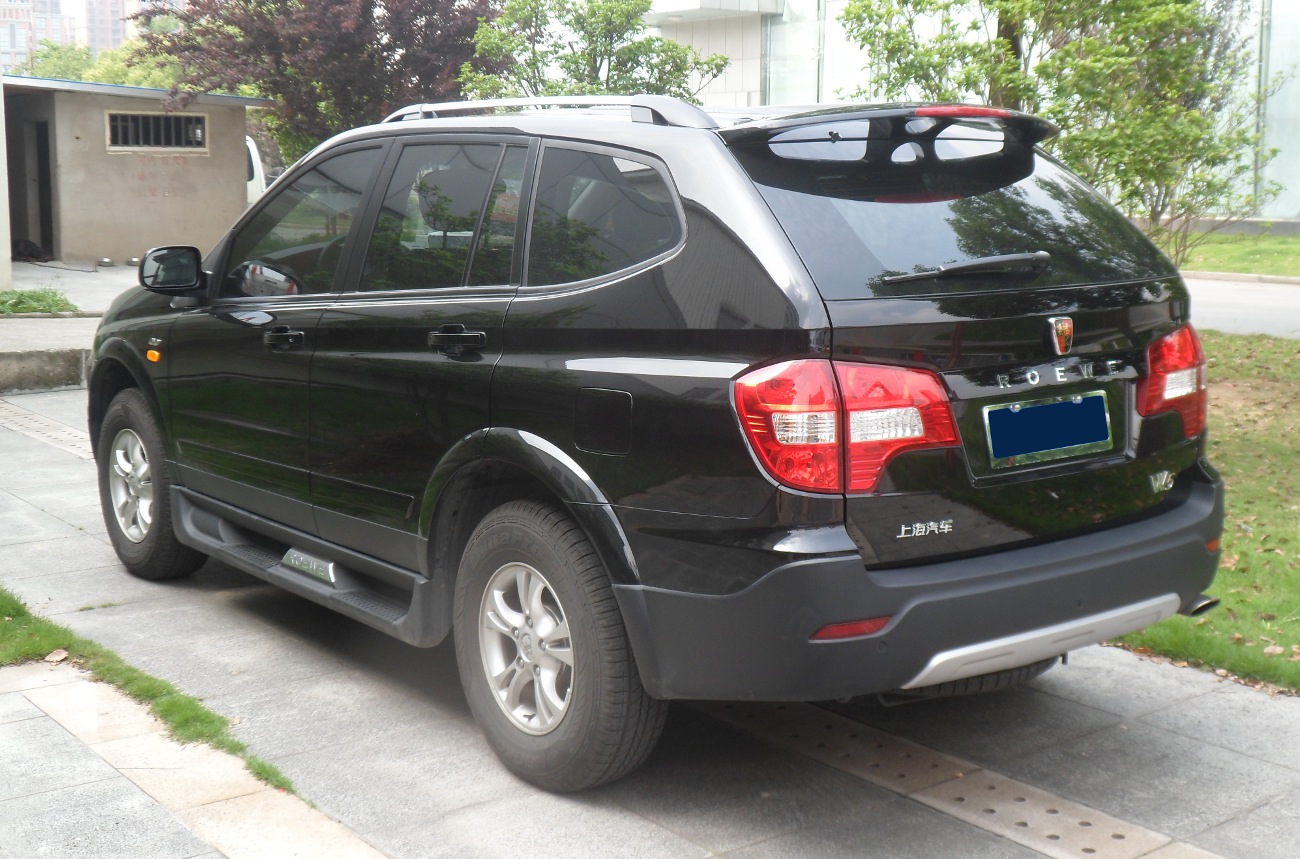
Roewe W5 facelift (rear)
