= SAIC Kavachi engine =

Kavachi engine TCI-Tech

Overview
- Manufacturer: SAIC Motor
- Production: 2008–2017

Layout
- Configuration: Straight-four
- Displacement: 1.8 L (1,796 cc; 109.6 cu in)
- Cylinder bore: 80 mm (3.15 in)
- Piston stroke: 89.3 mm (3.52 in)
- Cylinder block material: Aluminum
- Cylinder head material: Aluminum
- Valvetrain: DOHC 4 valves x cyl. with VVC

Combustion
- Fuel system: Multi-port fuel injection
- Fuel type: Gasoline
- Oil system: Wet sump
- Cooling system: Water-cooled

Output
- Power output: 131 hp (98 kW) at 6,000 rpm (naturally aspirated); 158 hp (118 kW) at 5,500 rpm (turbocharged)
- Torque output: 168 N⋅m (124 lb⋅ft) at 4,500 rpm (naturally aspirated); 215 hp (160 kW) at 2,500–4,500 rpm (turbocharged)

Chronology
- Predecessor: Rover K-series engine

The Kavachi engine, commonly known as the TCI-Tech, was developed by SAIC Motor, based on a re-engineering of the Rover K-series engine. It is used in Roewe and MG Motor vehicles.

The 1796cc Kavachi engine is produced in two versions, a naturally aspirated producing 98 kW (131 bhp; 133 PS) at 6,000 rpm and 168 N⋅m (124 lb⋅ft) at 4,500 rpm, and a turbocharged version producing 118 kW (158 bhp) at 5,500 rpm and 215 N⋅m (159 lb⋅ft) of torque from 2,500 to 4,500 rpm. It is Drive-by-wire.

UK engineering firm Ricardo plc were tasked with remedying the well known faults of the K series by SAIC Motor for its introduction into the Chinese marketplace. With a redesigned head, improved waterways, stiffened block as well as changing the manufacturing process and quality of material, the Kavachi is seen as the pinnacle of K-series development. As of 2015, with more than half a decade in the market, there have been no reported issues of head gasket failure on cars using the Kavachi engine.

A point to note, the Kavachi engine is sometimes referred to and often confused with the N Series engine. The N Series is also a development of the original K Series but was in fact produced by Nanjing Automobile (NAC) a rival company at the time to SAIC. (later merged)

N Series was fitted into the relaunched MG TF in the UK and in the MG3 SW and MG7 in China.

== Applications ==
- 2008–2014 Roewe 550/MG 550
- 2008–2016 Roewe 750/MG 750
- 2009–2017 MG 6
- 2011–2015 Roewe W5
