= MG6 (automobile) =

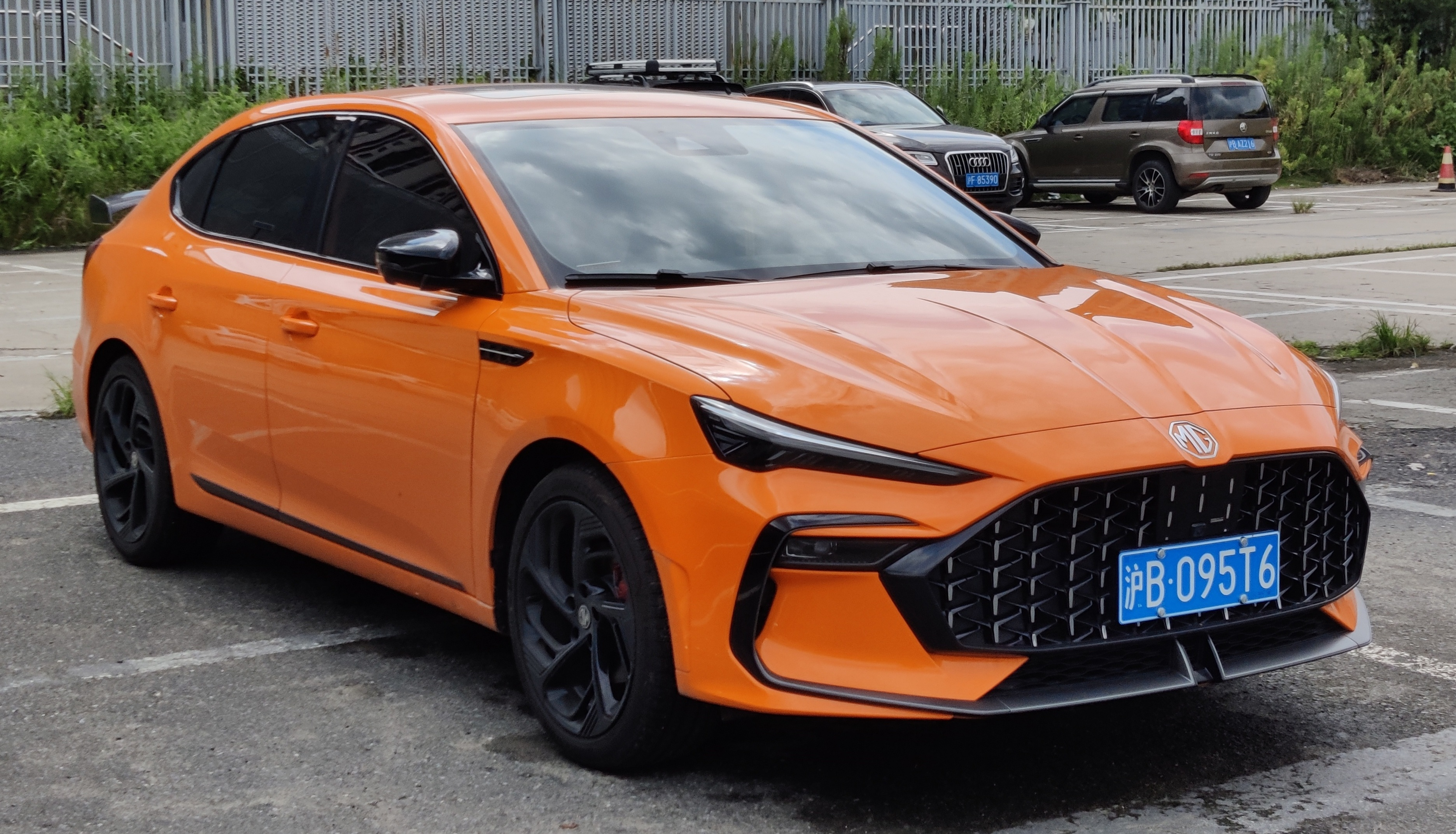
- 2021 MG6 Pro

Overview
- Manufacturer: MG Motor (SAIC Motor)
- Production: 2009–present

Body and chassis
- Class: Small family car (C); Compact executive car (D)
- Layout: Front-engine, front-wheel-drive

Chronology
- Predecessor: Rover 45; MG ZS; MG 7

The MG6 is a compact car which has been produced by SAIC under British MG marque since 2010. It is slotted slightly above the compact sedan MG GT, and the compact hatchback MG 5.

== First generation (2009) ==
First generation
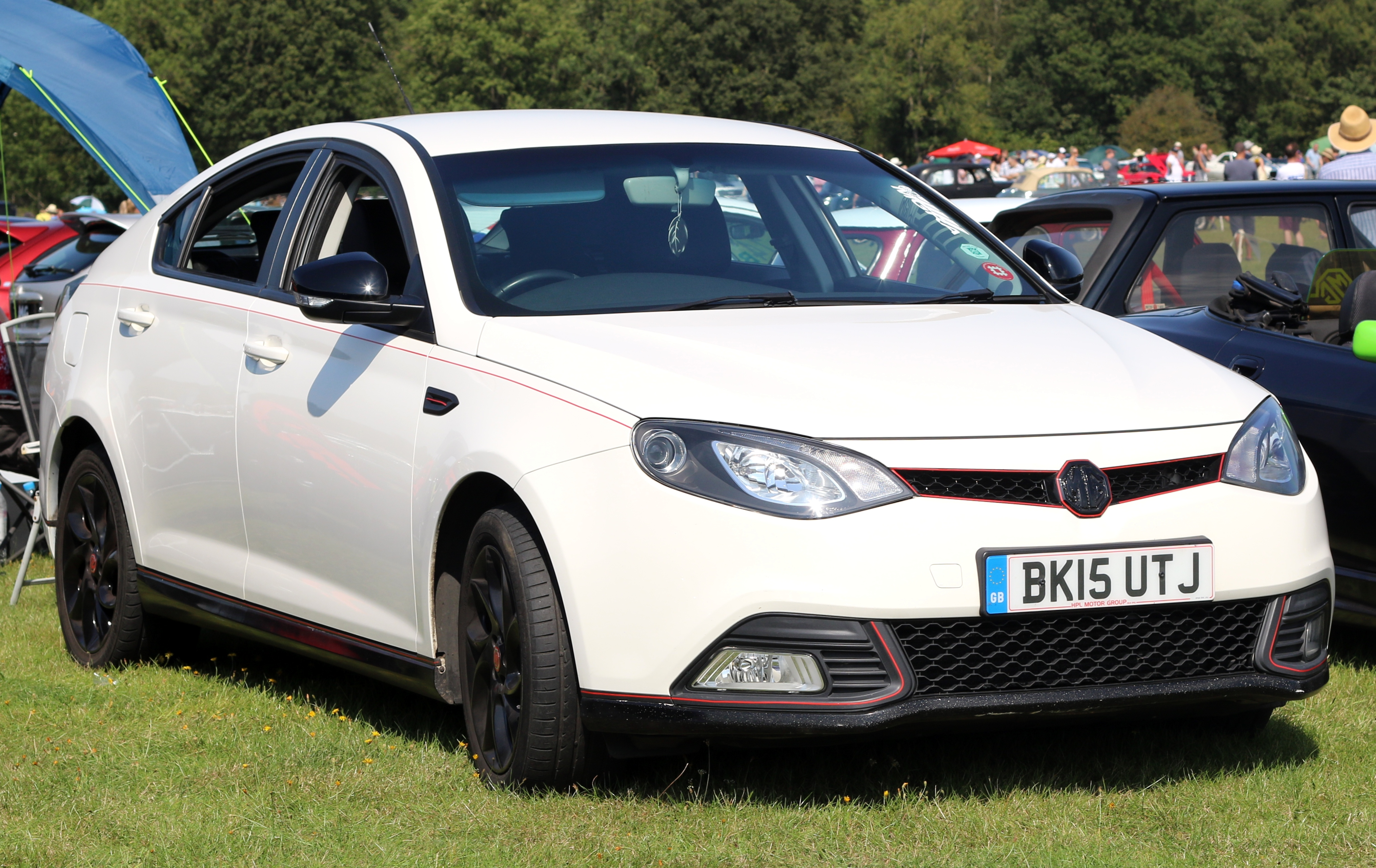

Overview
- Production: 2009–2016
- Assembly: China: Nanjing (NAC); United Kingdom: Birmingham (Longbridge plant); Thailand: Laem Chabang (SAIC-CP)
- Designer: Anthony Williams-Kenny

Body and chassis
- Body style: 5-door liftback/fastback (GT); 4-door Sedan
- Related: Roewe 550

Powertrain
- Engine: Petrol; 1.8L Kavachi DVVT I4; 1.8L Kavachi 18K4G Turbo TCi-Tech I4; Diesel; 1.9L JTD DTi-Tech I4
- Transmission: 5-speed manual; 6-speed manual; 5-speed Automatic with manual shift mode; 6-speed DCT

Dimensions
- Wheelbase: 2,705 mm (106.5 in)
- Length: 4,651 mm (183.1 in)
- Width: 1,830 mm (72.0 in)
- Height: 1,472 mm (58.0 in)
- Curb weight: 1,495 kg (3,296 lb)

The first-generation MG6 was initially announced in April 2009 at the Shanghai Auto Show, as a five-door GT/fastback, and in October 2010 at Shanghai Expo, as a four-door notchback saloon model. It is derived from the Roewe 550, hence being distantly related to the Rover 75, sharing its front subframe.

The five-door fastback/hatchback, known as the MG6 GT, went on sale in the United Kingdom in May 2011, the saloon, known as the MG6 Magnette, went on sale on 16 July 2011. A diesel model joined the range at the end of 2012. The first Thai assembled car rolled off the assembly line on 4 June 2014, with a potential for 5,000 cars per annum.

The MG6 sold below expectations in the United Kingdom, eventually being dropped from the range there in 2016, whilst continuing in other markets.

=== History ===
Like the Roewe 550, some of the development and styling of the MG6 was done at the SAIC UK Technical Centre although the main design and development contract was given to EDAG: Shanghai. It was originally designed as a Roewe badged model (IP22 Project) but, as SAIC took control of Nanjing Auto, owners of the MG brand, the nearly finished vehicle went through a facelift and came out as the first Chinese MG car.

The MG6 commenced production in China in 2010, and for a brief period in partially knock down form at Longbridge, United Kingdom, from 13 April 2011. From 2013, the MG 3 supermini also saw some limited final assembly at the same factory until 2016.

Following the hatchback 6 GT, the notchback saloon version debuted in June 2011, carrying the Magnette name, which was used by MG during the 1950s to 1960s for its saloon cars, and also in the 1930s for the MG K-type. The MG6 Magnette is quite different from the MG6 GT GT/fastback, as it has a boot rather than a hatchback.

=== Models ===
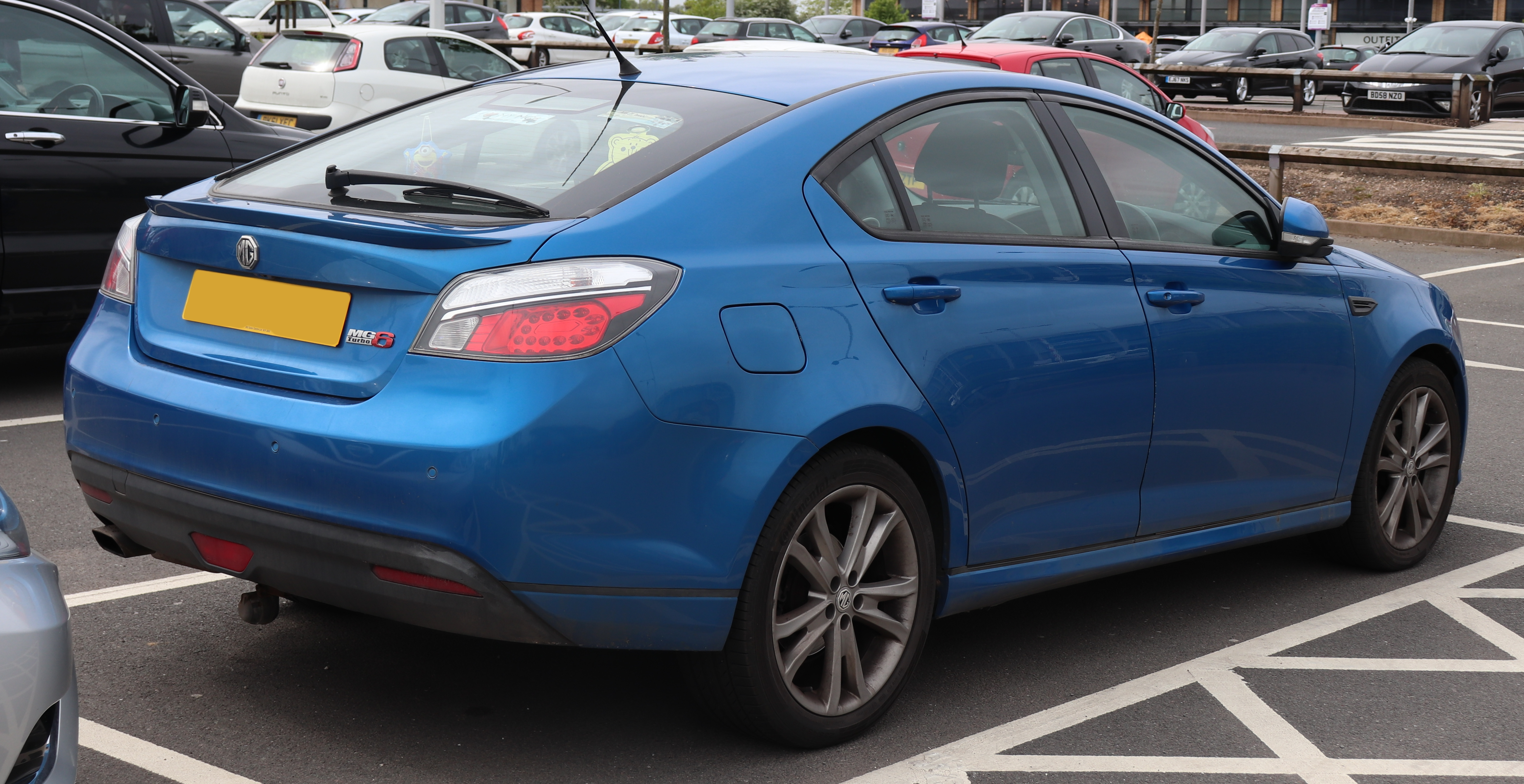
MG6 1.8 Turbo liftback sedan (rear)

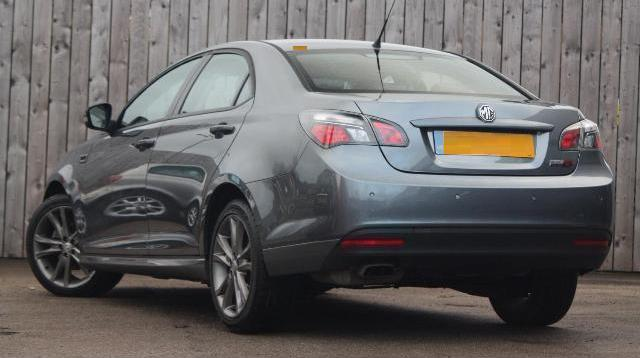
MG6 four-door sedan (rear)

In the United Kingdom, the car was initially launched as the MG6, but on release to the public in May 2011 as the fastback model, was announced as the MG6 GT. For the MG6 GT, three levels of trim are available with increasing levels of equipment and trim: S, SE and TSE.

These all share the same mechanical specification, although the TSE gains 18" wheels over the standard 17".

The launch models were available with the petrol TCI-Tech 1.8-litre engine, available in two states of tune, 133 bhp (99 kW; 135 PS) and 158 bhp (118 kW; 160 PS) (with turbo), the latter being available from launch in China and as the only engine option at launch in the United Kingdom.

All models are equipped with a five-speed manual transmission, front MacPherson strut suspension and multi-link rear suspension. The 1.8 L turbo can accelerate to 60 mph in 8.4 seconds, has an official combined fuel consumption of 35.6 mpg and a CO_{2} figure of 184 g/km.

Top speed is restricted to 120 mph (193 km/h) to allow the car to be a rated a lower insurance bracket. Minor improvements to the MG6 in April 2012 resulted in fuel economy figure of 37.7 mpg (official combined) and reducing CO_{2} down to 174 g/km.

A 1.9-litre diesel DTi Tech engine joined the range at the end of 2012, producing 148 bhp (110 kW; 150 PS) and 350 N⋅m (258 lbf⋅ft) and producing CO_{2} emissions of 139 g/km. The diesel engine is mated to a six-speed manual gearbox, and the steering has changed to an electro hydraulic-powered system.

Due to the introduction and the success of the MG6 in the British Touring Car Championship, MG announced a special edition for the United Kingdom, this being the MG6 BTCC Special Edition. The BTCC Special Edition was based on the SE model.

It came with a matt black roof (vinyl wrap), matt black 18-inch MG6 TSE alloy wheels, black-gloss sills, black-gloss door mirror covers, black-gloss lower-front air dam and rear spoiler. The front grille has a BTCC badge and a distinctive multi-coloured MG KX Momentum Racing team decal is on the bonnet extension panel above the front grille, on the fastback boot lid and on the front doors and wings just behind the chrome wing vent.

The BTCC Special Edition was only available in union blue or arctic white. BTCC Edition graphics are also highlighted on the sills and also inside the car on the passenger facia. In July 2014, the diesel engine was updated, reducing its CO_{2} emissions to 129 g/km. The MG6 was facelifted for April 2015, receiving a range of exterior and interior changes including a 75 kg (165 lb) reduction in weight. It was unveiled at the Chengdu Motor Show in August 2014.

In the United Kingdom, the main mechanical changes comprised an improvement in efficiency for the diesel model, and the withdrawal of the petrol version. The facelifted model can be identified by its new lights and bumpers, front and rear, and a substantially updated interior, including a new console and electronic parking brake. Models in other markets retained two versions of the 1.8-litre petrol engine.

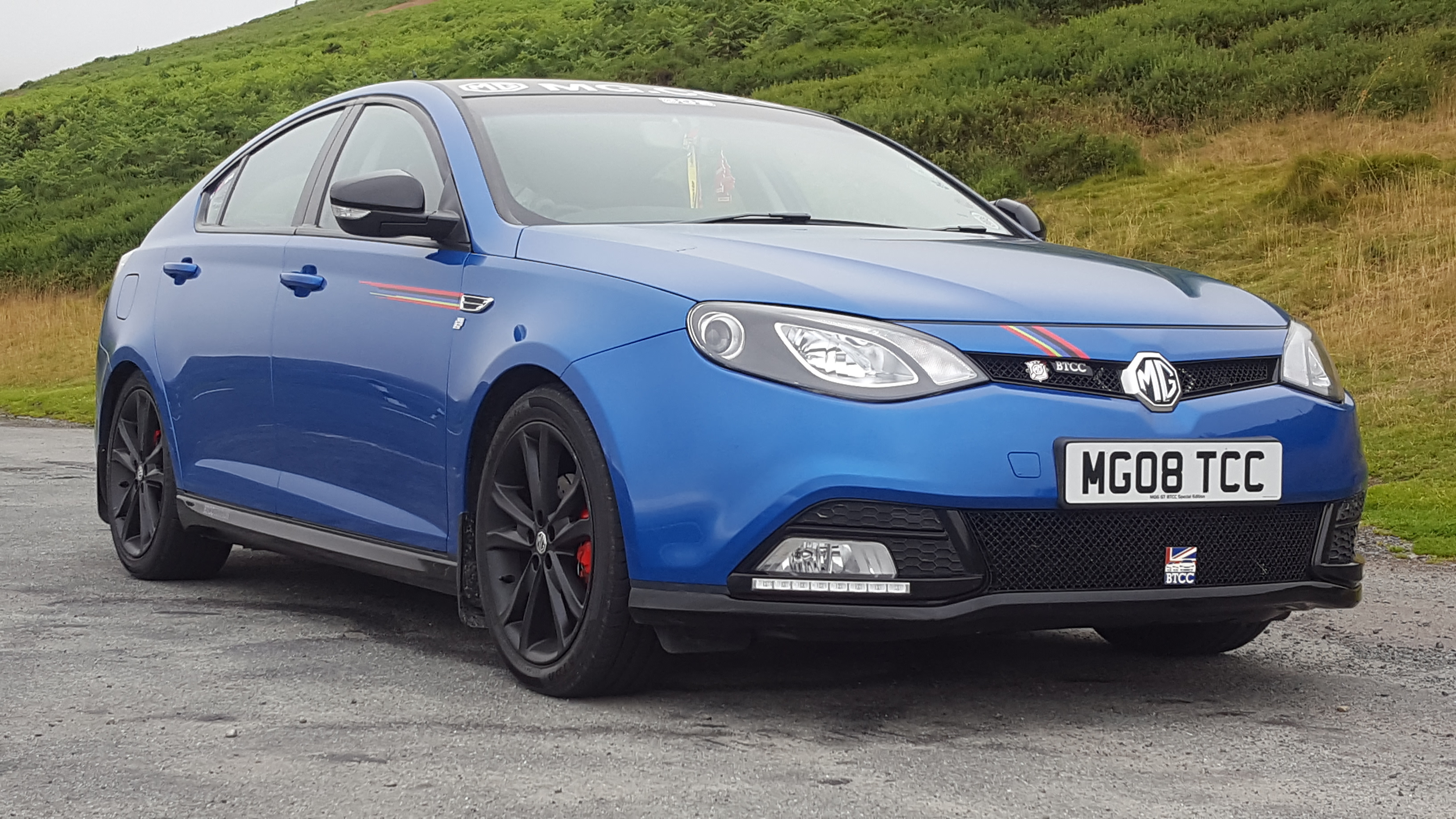
2014 MG6 SE BTCC Special Edition

=== Awards ===
The MG6 won the What Car? 2012 Security Award. In the Auto Express Driver Power Survey in 2014, it won the Best Handling Award, and came sixth overall in the 'Best Car to Own' category. In 2016, the MG6 won three awards, these being.

- Auto Express Driver Power: Best Family Car Bronze Winner
- Auto Express Driver Power Road Handling: Silver Winner
- The Caravan Club Tow Car of the Year: Class Winner under £17,500.

=== Engines ===
The engines available in the United Kingdom for the MG6 were:

Petrol engines
Model	Engine	Displacement	Date	Power	Torque	Top Speed	0–62 mph (0–100 km/h)	Combined economy	CO_{2} emissions
1.8 TCi Tech (18K4G)	I4	1,796 cc	2010–2015	160 PS (118 kW; 158 hp) at 5,500 rpm	215 N⋅m (159 lbf⋅ft) at 1,750–4,500 rpm	120 mph (193 km/h)	8.4s	37.7 mpg_{‑imp} (7.5 L/100 km)	174 g/km
Diesel engines
Model	Engine	Displacement	Date	Power	Torque	Top Speed	0–62 mph (0–100 km/h)	Combined economy	CO_{2} emissions
1.9 DTi Tech	I4	1,849 cc	2012–2014	150 PS (110 kW; 148 hp) at 4,000 rpm	350 N⋅m (258 lbf⋅ft) at 1,800 rpm	120 mph (193 km/h)	8.9s	57.6 mpg_{‑imp} (4.9 L/100 km)	139 g/km
1.9 DTi Tech	I4	1,849 cc	2014–2015	150 PS (110 kW; 148 hp) at 4,000 rpm	350 N⋅m (258 lbf⋅ft) at 1,800 rpm	120 mph (193 km/h)	8.9s	57.6 mpg_{‑imp} (4.9 L/100 km)	129 g/km
1.9 DTi Tech	I4	1,849 cc	2015–2016	150 PS (110 kW; 148 hp) at 4,000 rpm	350 N⋅m (258 lbf⋅ft) at 1,800 rpm	120 mph (193 km/h)	8.4s	61.4 mpg_{‑imp} (4.6 L/100 km)	119 g/km

The engines available in China and Thailand for the New MG6 are:

Petrol engines
Model	Engine	Displacement	Power	Torque	Top Speed	0–62 mph (0–100 km/h)	Combined economy	CO_{2} emissions
1.8 TCi Tech (18K4G)	I4	1,796 cc	161 PS (118 kW; 159 hp) at 5,500 rpm	215 N⋅m (159 lbf⋅ft) at 1,750–4,500 rpm	130 mph (209 km/h)	11.09s	42.5 mpg_{‑imp} (6.6 L/100 km)	174 g/km
1.8 TCi Tech (18K4G)	I4	1,796 cc	161 PS (118 kW; 159 hp) at 5,500 rpm	215 N⋅m (159 lbf⋅ft) at 1,750–4,500 rpm	132 mph (212 km/h)	10.35s	41.1 mpg_{‑imp} (6.9 L/100 km)	174 g/km
1.8 DVVT Tech (Kavachi)	I4	1,796 cc	135 PS (99 kW; 133 hp) at 5,500 rpm	215 N⋅m (159 lbf⋅ft) at 1,750–4,500 rpm	120 mph (193 km/h)			
Diesel engines
Model	Engine	Displacement	Power	Torque	Top Speed	0–62 mph (0–100 km/h)	Combined economy	CO_{2} emissions
1.9 DTi Tech	I4	1,849 cc	150 PS (110 kW; 148 hp) at 4,000 rpm	350 N⋅m (258 lbf⋅ft) at 1,800 rpm	120 mph (193 km/h)	8.9s	57.6 mpg_{‑imp} (4.9 L/100 km)	129 g/km

=== Safety ===
Euro NCAP 6	Points	Rating
Overall Score:	81.0 out of 128	4/5 stars
Adult Occupant:	26.4 out of 36	73%
Child Occupant:	34.6 out of 49	71%
Pedestrian Impact:	15.0 out of 36	42%
Safety Assist:	5.0 out of 7	71%

ANCAP test results* MG 6 all variants (2013)
Test	Score
Overall	5 /5 stars
Frontal offset	10.22/16
Side impact	13.51/16
Pole	2/2
Seat belt reminders	2/3
Whiplash protection	Pending
Pedestrian protection	Marginal
Electronic stability control	Standard

=== Sales ===
Initial sales in 2011 of the MG6 were slow in the United Kingdom, with only fifteen units in October 2011, only seven registrations for the MG brand as a whole were recorded in November (of which three were presumably TF roadsters). Some cited lack of advertising and low perceived quality as problematic, while the absence of a diesel and an estate option were also mooted.

In December 2011, car rental company Avis UK Ltd announced that it would be running one hundred MG6 GT and Magnette in its rental fleet, and took delivery of these cars. For 2012, MG sold 782 cars in the United Kingdom. Initial production was projected in the range of 2,000 to 3,000 per annum, although these volumes were never achieved, and in 2016, MG Motor UK withdrew the MG6 from sale in the United Kingdom.

=== Reviews ===
- The AA
  Likes: Sharp handling and good ride, high standard specification, great value for money, good space efficiency.
  Gripes: Noisy engine when extended, some low-quality cabin materials, no automatic option.
- Autocar
  'The MG6 is now a greener proposition than ever before, but its bland cabin aesthetics are still letting the side down.'
- Auto Express
  For: Involving handling, performance, standard kit levels.
  Against: Limited engine choice, poor quality interior, awkward looks.
- Auto Trader
  'Despite Chinese ownership, the MG 6 is designed and built at Longbridge to take on family [cars]. It's a decent drive, with sharp handling, and there's loads of interior space. Some serious flaws, though.'
- Evo
  [+] One of the best in its class to drive, well priced.
  [-] Don't expect premium feel at these prices, gutless [petrol] engine and low-rent cabin.
- MSN Cars
  Positives: ride and handling, equipment, practicality, styling and price.
  Negatives: interior plastics [and] economy.

== Second generation (2016) ==
Second generation
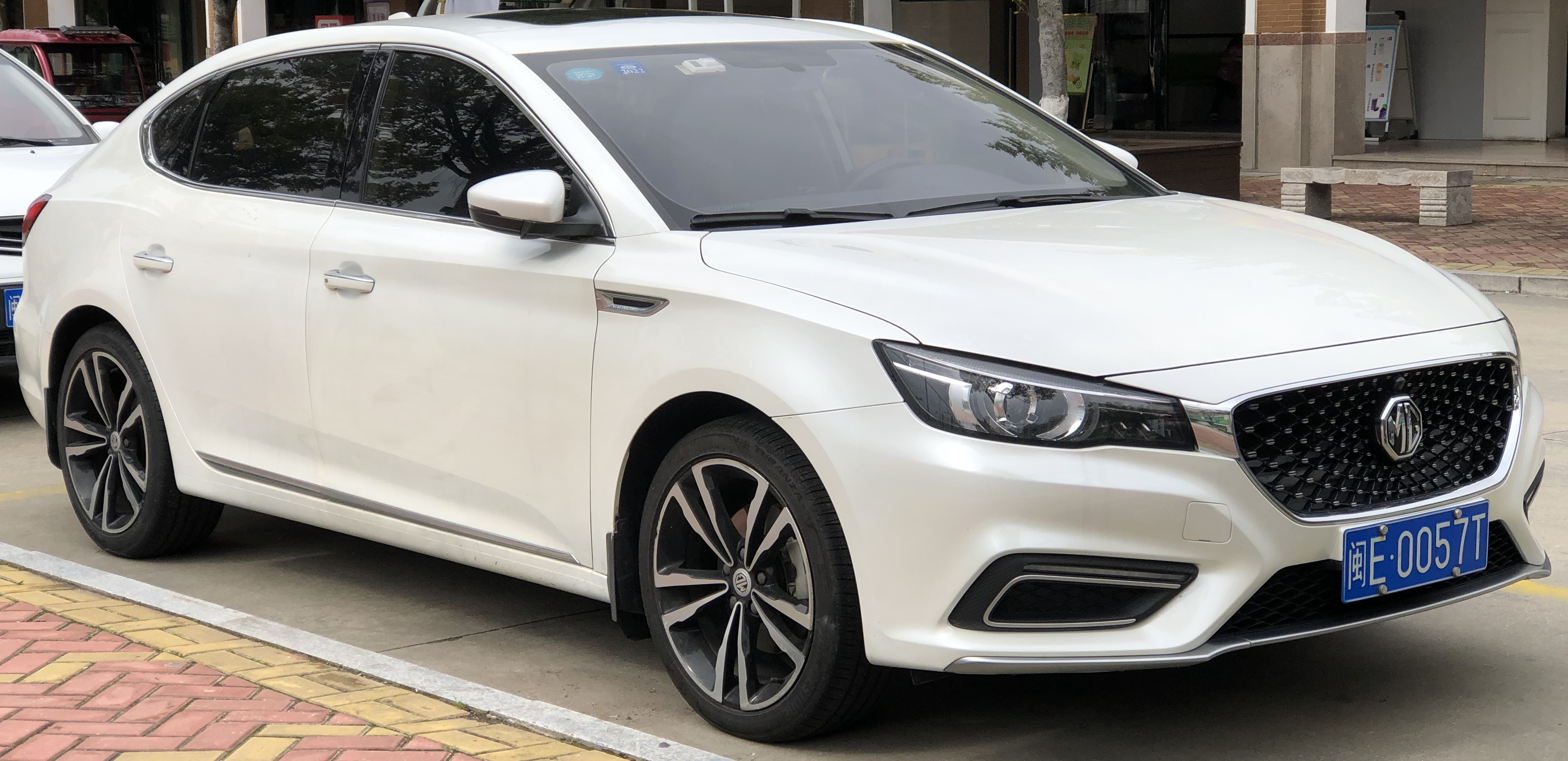
- 2019 MG6

Overview
- Model code: IP32
- Production: 2016–present
- Assembly: China: Nanjing (NAC)

Body and chassis
- Body style: 5-door fastback sedan
- Related: Roewe i6

Powertrain
- Engine: 1.5L 15E4E (20T) Turbo I4 (petrol) (MG6/MG6 Pro/MG6 X-Line); 1.0L SGE Turbo I3 + SAIC EDU (45T eMG6); 1.5L GM/SAIC SGE + SAIC EDU turbo I4 (eMG6 PHEV)
- Electric motor: Synchronous Permanent Magnetic Motor (PHEV Version)
- Transmission: 6-speed manual (MG 6; 2017-2020); 7-speed DCT (MG 6/MG 6 Pro/MG6 X-Line); 2-speed DHT transmission (eMG6 PHEV); 10-speed automated manual (MG6 X-Power)
- Hybrid drivetrain: Plug-in Hybrid (eMG6 PHEV)
- Battery: 9.1 kWh Lithium-ion (eMG6 PHEV)

Dimensions
- Wheelbase: 2,715 mm (106.9 in)
- Length: 4,704 mm (185.2 in) (MG 6/eMG6 PHEV); 4,722 mm (185.9 in) (MG 6 X-Power); 4,727 mm (186.1 in) (MG 6 Pro); 4,738 mm (186.5 in) (MG 6 X-Line)
- Width: 1,848 mm (72.8 in) (MG 6/MG 6 Pro/eMG6 PHEV/MG 6 X-Line); 1,890 mm (74.4 in) (MG 6 X-Power)
- Height: 1,466 mm (57.7 in) (MG 6); 1,456 mm (57.3 in) (MG 6 X-Power/MG 6 X-Line); 1,470 mm (57.9 in) (MG 6 Pro); 1,463 mm (57.6 in) (eMG6 PHEV)
- Curb weight: 1,370 kg (3,020 lb) (MG 6/MG 6 X-Line); 1,540 kg (3,395 lb) (MG 6 X-Power); 1,335 kg (2,943 lb) (MG 6 Pro); 1,530 kg (3,373 lb) (eMG6 PHEV)

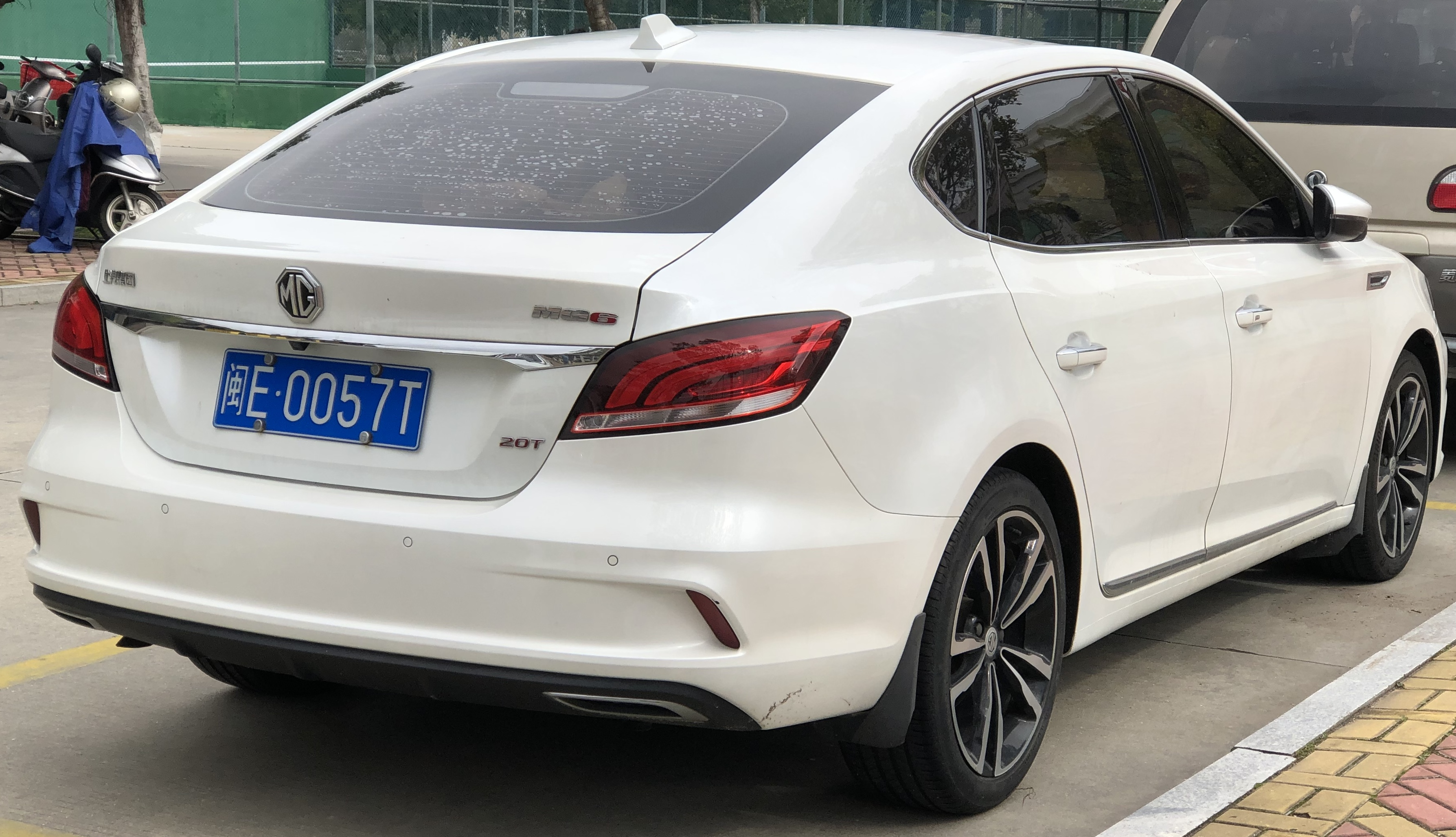
Rear view

In November 2016, the second generation was unveiled at Nanjing Wanchi race track. The second-generation MG6 incorporates MG's new design language, "Emotional Dynamism", which was launched with MG's second SUV, the MG ZS in 2016. The new grille which is an important part of MG's new design language is called 'Star Rider'.

The MG6 shares a platform with the sedan Roewe i6, and just like the Roewe ei6, an eMG6 plug-in hybrid version is also available.

MG showed off a 350 horsepower (260 kW; 350 PS) concept as the MG6 XPower at the Shanghai Motor Show in 2019, bringing back the sports sub-brand from the early 2000s. The company said the car would retail at €100,000 if there was sufficient interest.

=== eMG6 PHEV ===
The eMG6 PHEV is the plug-in hybrid version of the second-generation MG6. The plug-in hybrid vehicle gets a combination of 1.5-litre turbocharged engine and an electric motor for a combined power output of 228 hp (170 kW; 231 PS) and 622 N⋅m (459 lb⋅ft; 63.4 kg⋅m) of torque. The eMG6 PHEV consumes 1.5 L/100 km (190 mpg_{‑imp}; 160 mpg_{‑US}) and has a range of 53 km (33 mi) in pure electric mode. The hybrid system of the eMG6 PHEV is supported by a 9.1 kWh IP67-rated battery and meets the UL2580 standard of United States. Available exterior colours for the eMG6 PHEV include Flame Red, Carbon Ash, and Pearlescent White. The solo interior colour option is known as Blazing Yellow. The eMG6's average fuel consumption is rated at 1.1 litres per 100 kilometres or 213 US MPG. This figure is also shared with another derivative of the MG 6, the MG 6 X-Power. The solo trim for the eMG6 is known as 500PHEV.

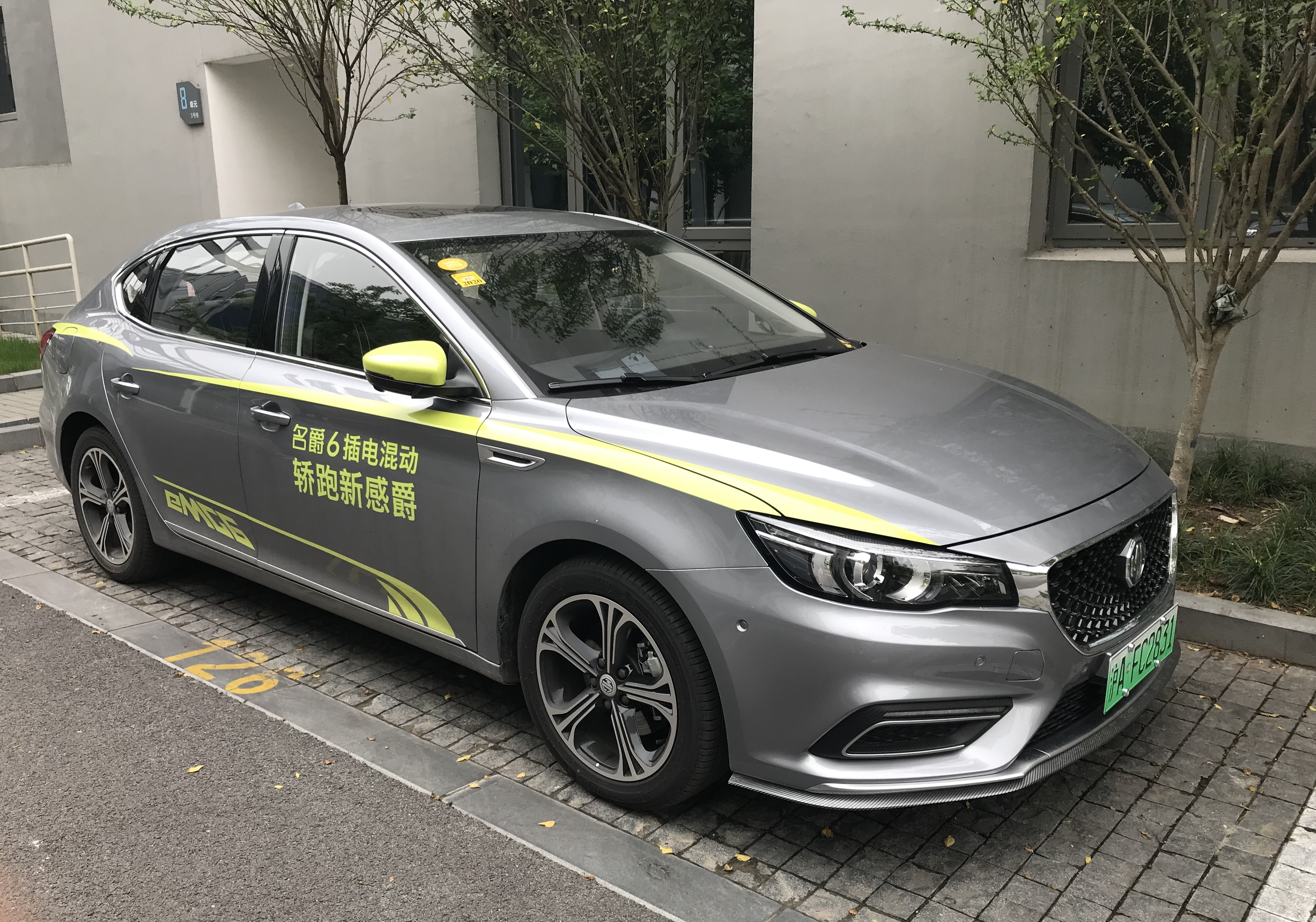
MG eMG6 PHEV front. Note that eMG6 is only equipped with a 17-inch wheel while petrol version has a larger 18-inch design.

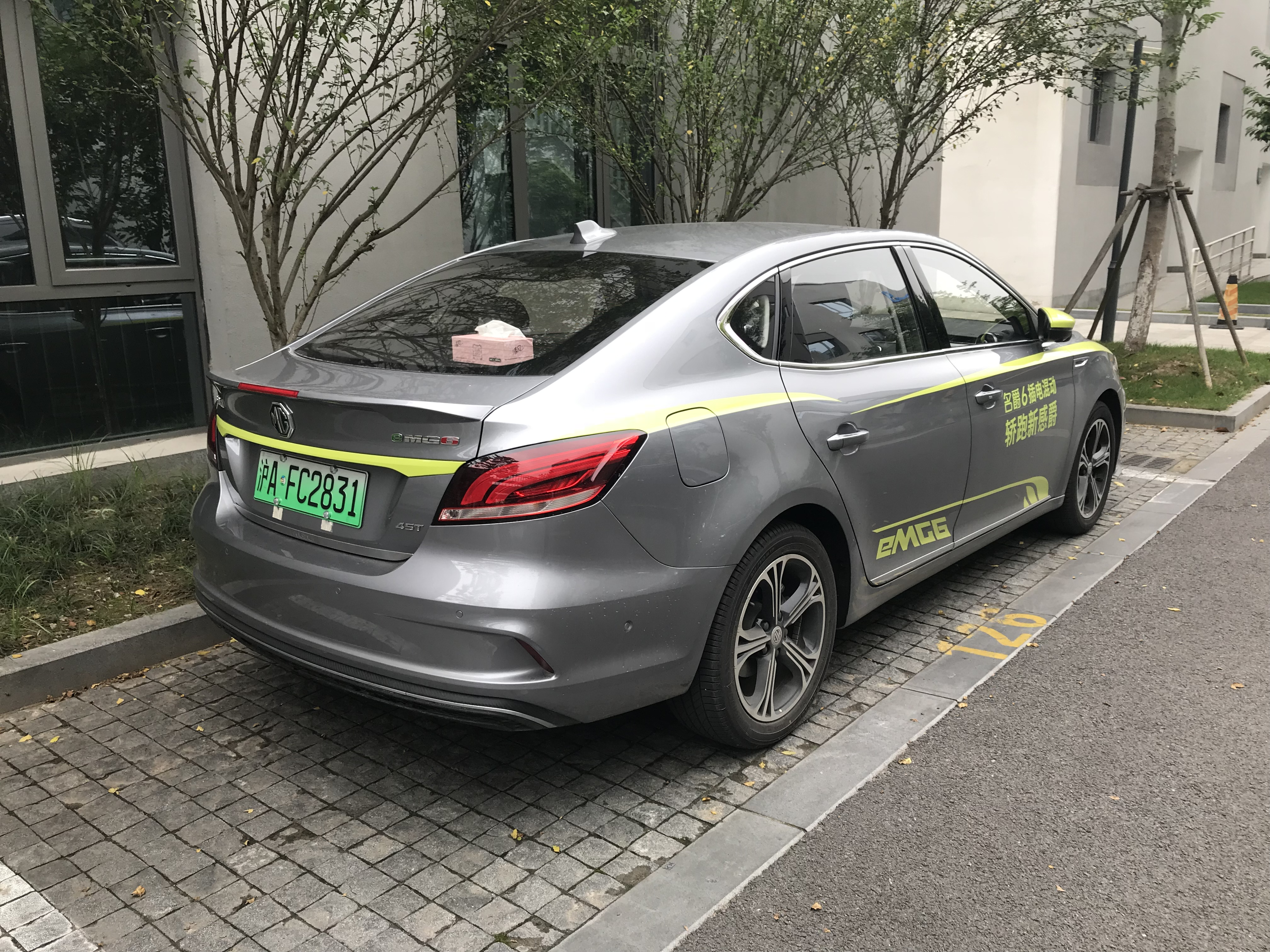
MG eMG6 PHEV rear. Exhaust pipe is hidden on eMG6.

=== 2020 facelift ===
In July 2020, the second-generation MG6 received a facelift marketed as the third-generation MG6 by SAIC MG. While marketed as a super wide-body sedan, the width is actually the same as the pre-facelift model with the redesigned front and rear end resulted in a 9 mm (0.4 in) length growth instead. The updated MG6 continues to be powered by a 1.5-litre turbo engine producing a maximum power of 181 hp (135 kW; 184 PS) and a peak torque of 285 N⋅m (210 lb⋅ft; 29.1 kg⋅m), which is an increase of 12 PS (12 hp; 8.8 kW) and 35 N⋅m (25.8 lb⋅ft; 3.57 kg⋅m), respectively, compared to the outgoing model. In terms of transmission, MG6 facelift is equipped with a 7-speed wet dual-clutch gearbox and a 6-speed manual transmission for 2020 only. The 2020 MG6 was launched in China on 10 July. Combined fuel consumption for the MG 6 is rated at 6.2 litres per 100 kilometres or 37.9 US MPG. This figure is also shared with its sporty derivative, the MG 6 Pro. Only one trim level is available, the 330TGI.

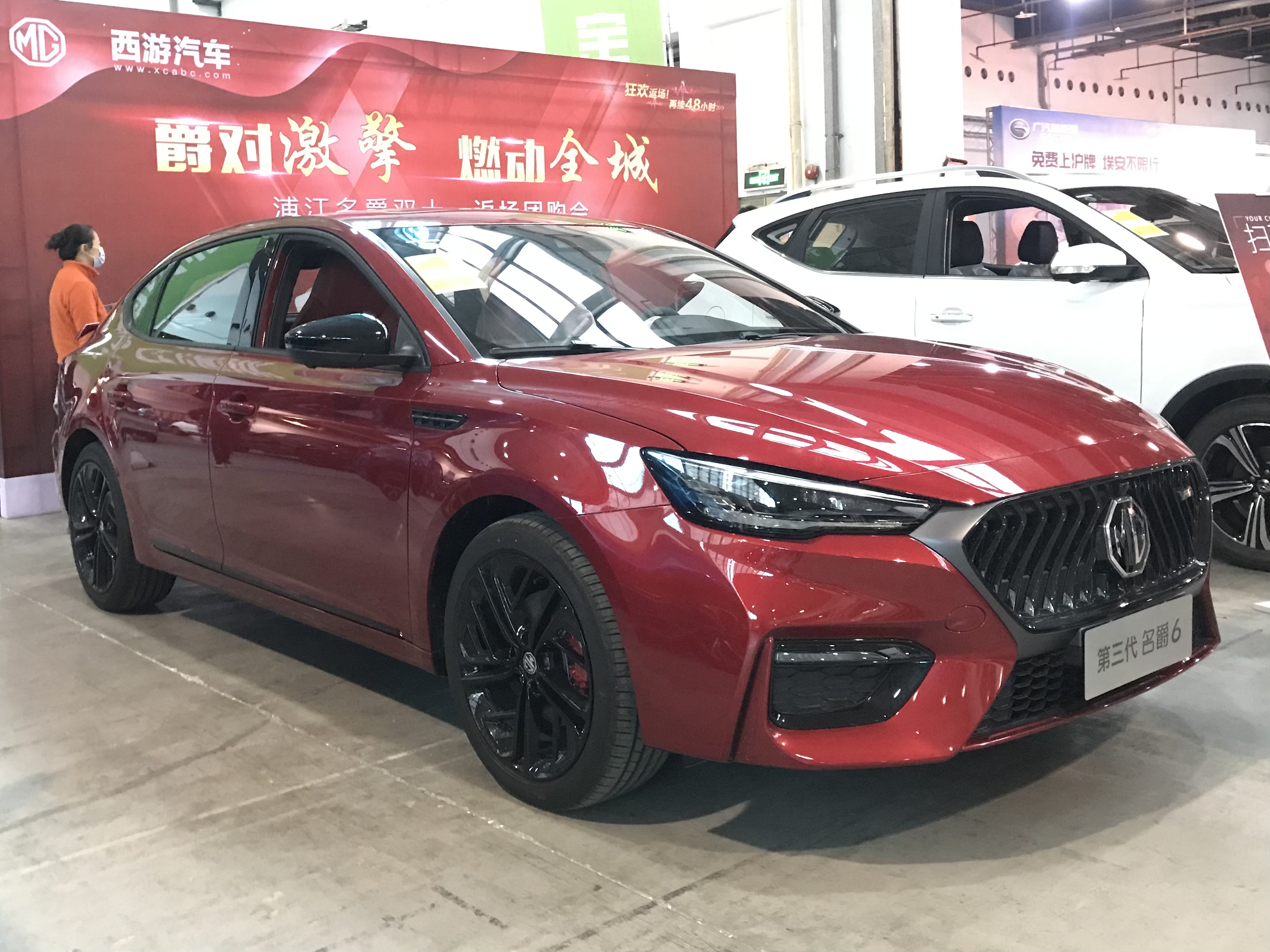
MG6 (facelift)

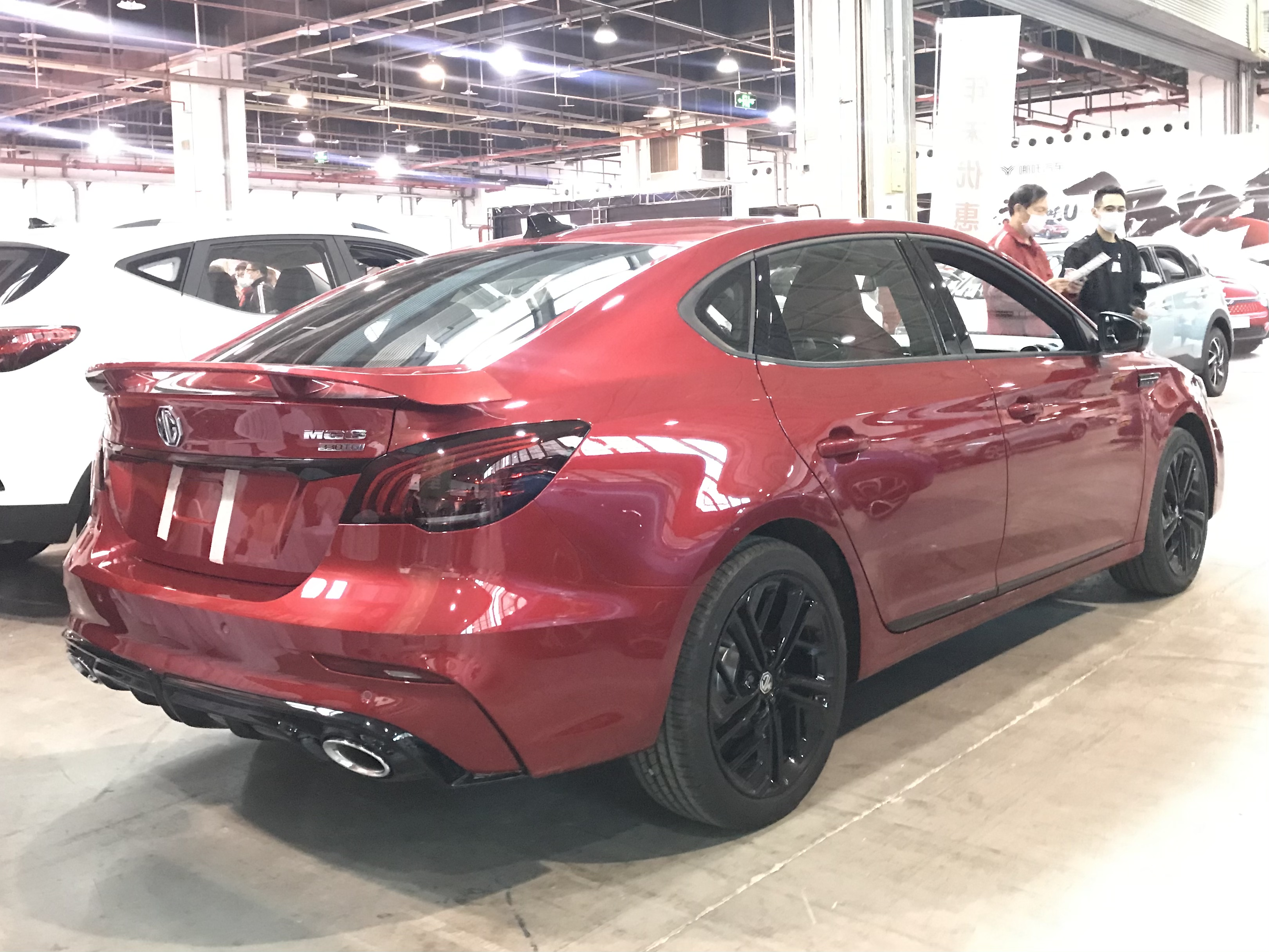
Rear view (facelift)

=== MG6 X-Power ===
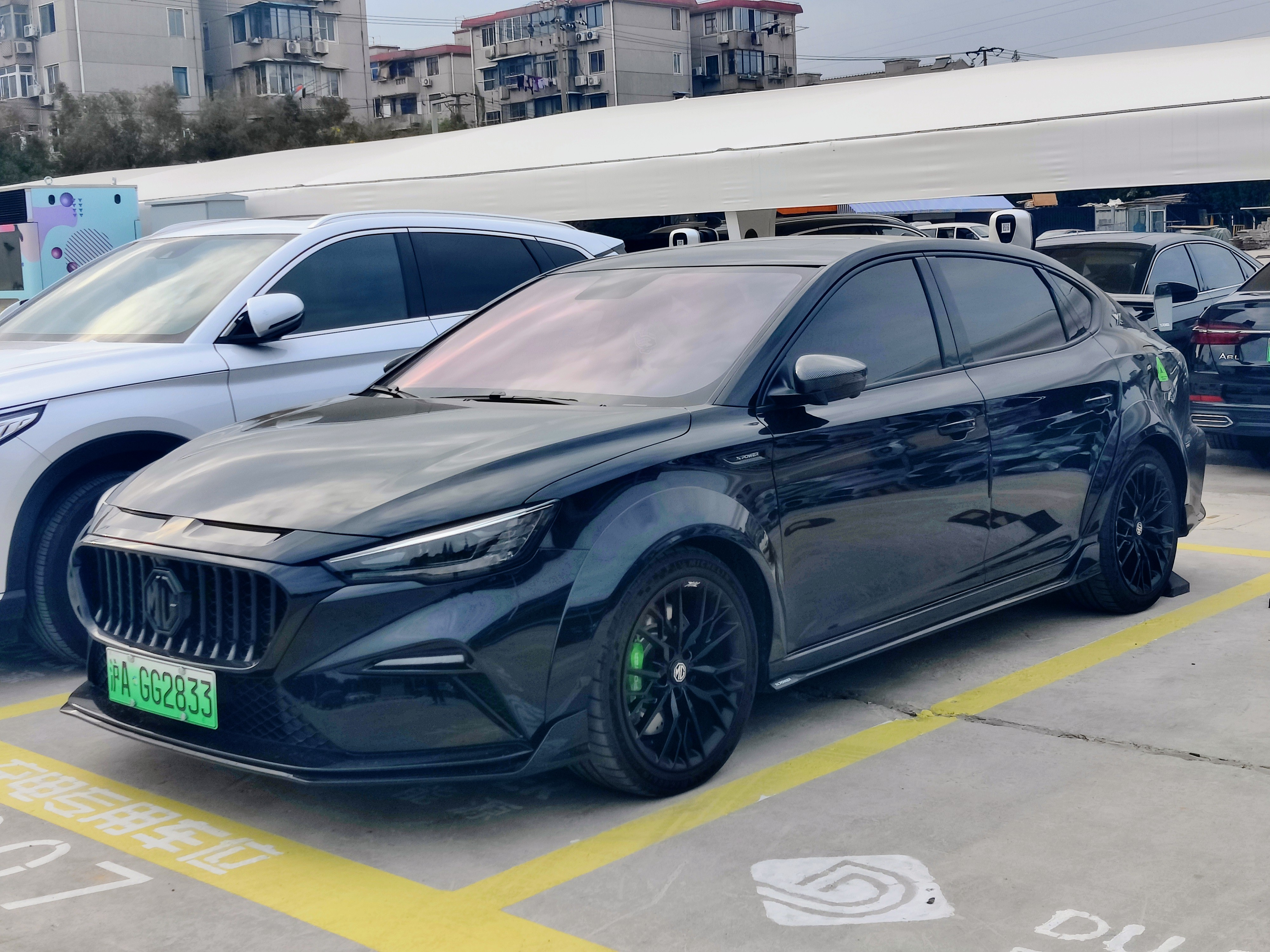

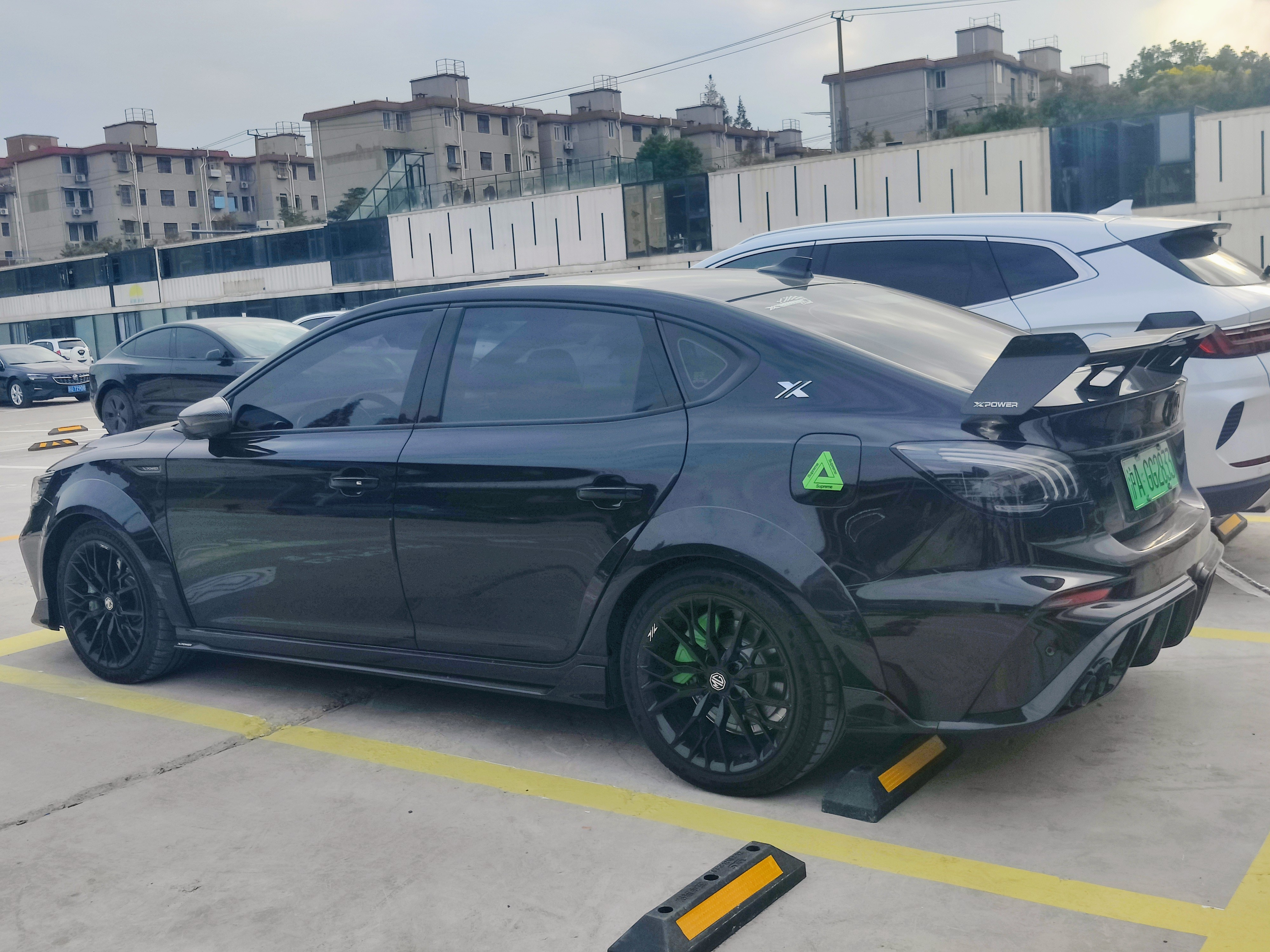
MG6 X-Power

The MG6 X-Power is the performance variant of the MG6. On 18 July 2021, MG declared the price of the X-Power variant to be 199,980 yuan (about US$30,000) in China. Consumers can pay 9.9 yuan to preorder the vehicle, and production is limited to 100 per month. As for the powertrain, the MG6 X-Power has a straight-4 1.5-litre turbo-charged engine with an electric motor with combined outputs of 300 hp (220 kW; 300 PS) and 480 N⋅m (354 lb⋅ft; 48.9 kg⋅m) of torque, sending its power to the front wheels. It is paired to a 10 speed automated manual gearbox. The 0–100 km/h (0–62 mph) acceleration time is 6 seconds, according to MG.

The MG6 X-Power is still available for purchase on China's MG website. Exterior colour choices are Qi Ji Green, Flame Red, Carbon Gray, and Obsidian Black. The standard interior is a two-toned textured interior consisting of a charcoal black base with green accent stitching and charcoal black sporty leather bucket seats with an X-Power logo stitched into the front lower seat area.

=== 2021 facelift ===
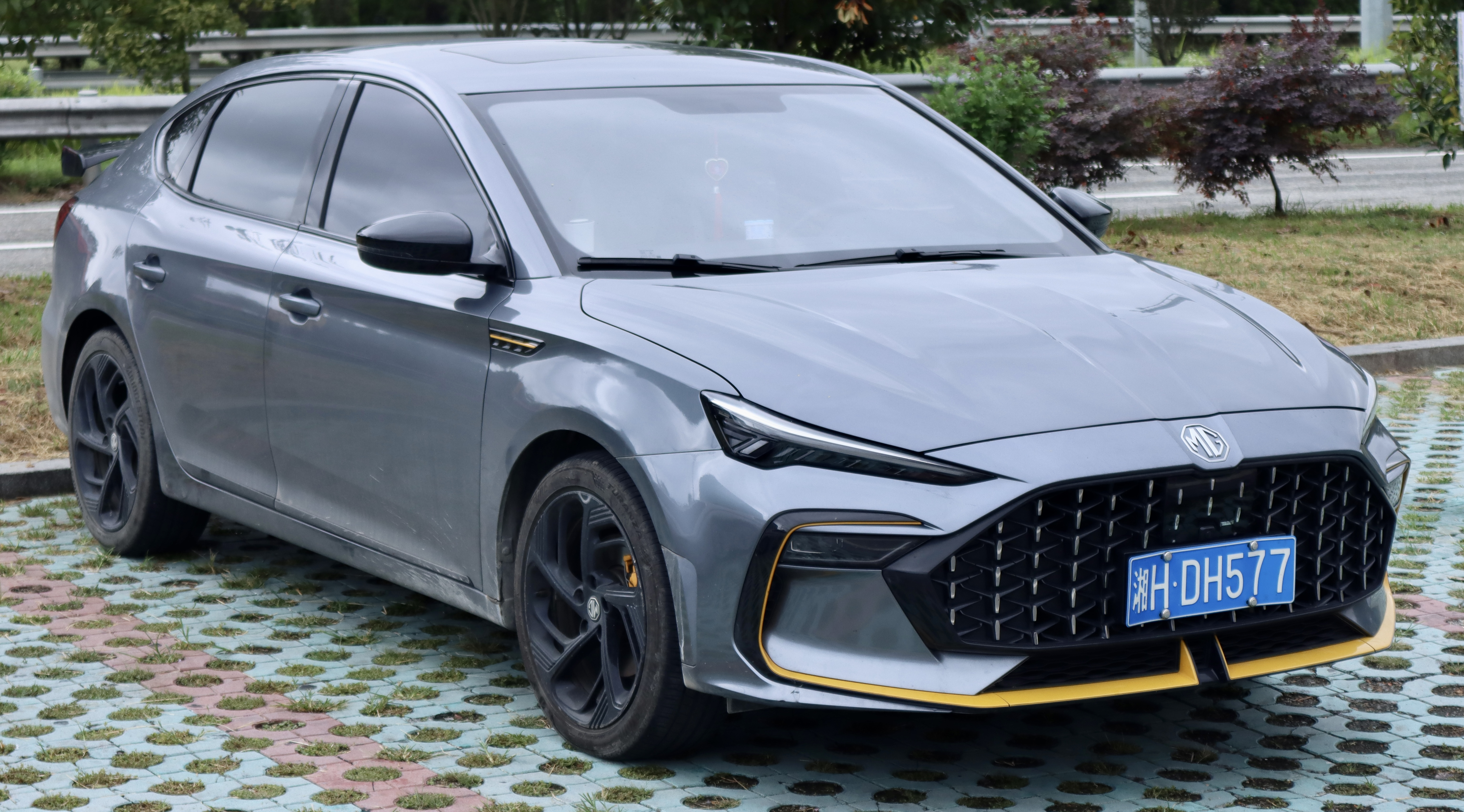

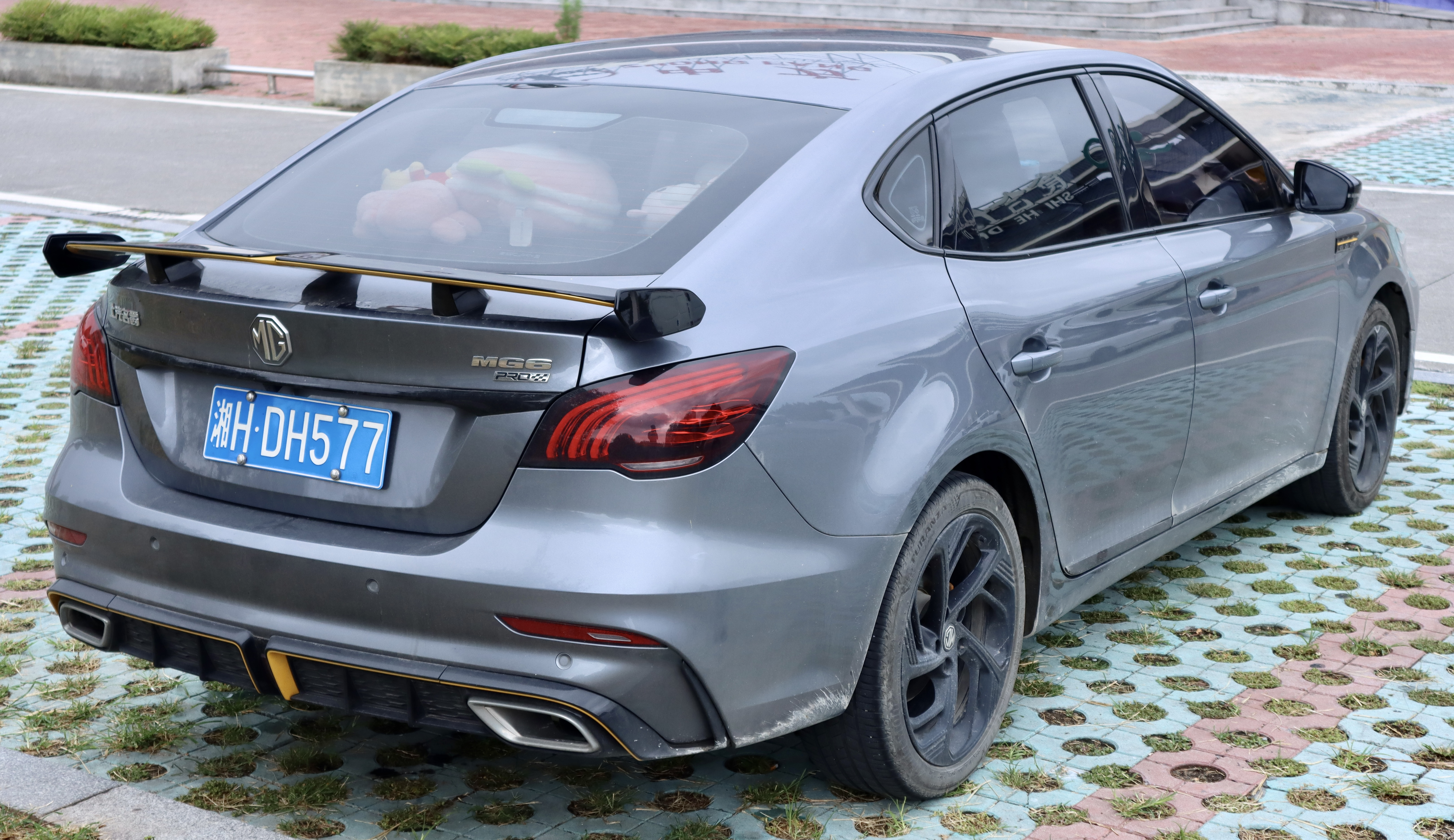
MG6 Pro

The MG6 received another facelift for the 2021 model year called the MG6 Pro. The MG6 Pro started presales in July 2021. Design wise, the MG6 Pro features a redesigned front end with slimmer headlamps and a larger grille in the same style as the second generation MG 5 for a more aggressive look. The updated model is powered by a 1.5-litre SGE-LFV turbo engine developing a maximum power output of 181 hp (135 kW; 184 PS) and 285 N⋅m (210 lb⋅ft; 29.1 kg⋅m). Gearbox is a 7-speed, wet-style, dual-clutch transmission. Available exterior colours are known as Bubble Orange, Thunder Gray, Obsidian Black, Pearl White, and Flame Red. Two Interior colours are available known as King Gray and Punk Black. The Pro is officially priced at 115,800 yuan for the Deluxe trim. Trophy trim pricing is between 123,800 and 139,800 yuan. Two tone white and black leather bucket seats with orange stitching along with an MG logo stitched into the front headrests are available as standard.

=== MG6 X-Line ===
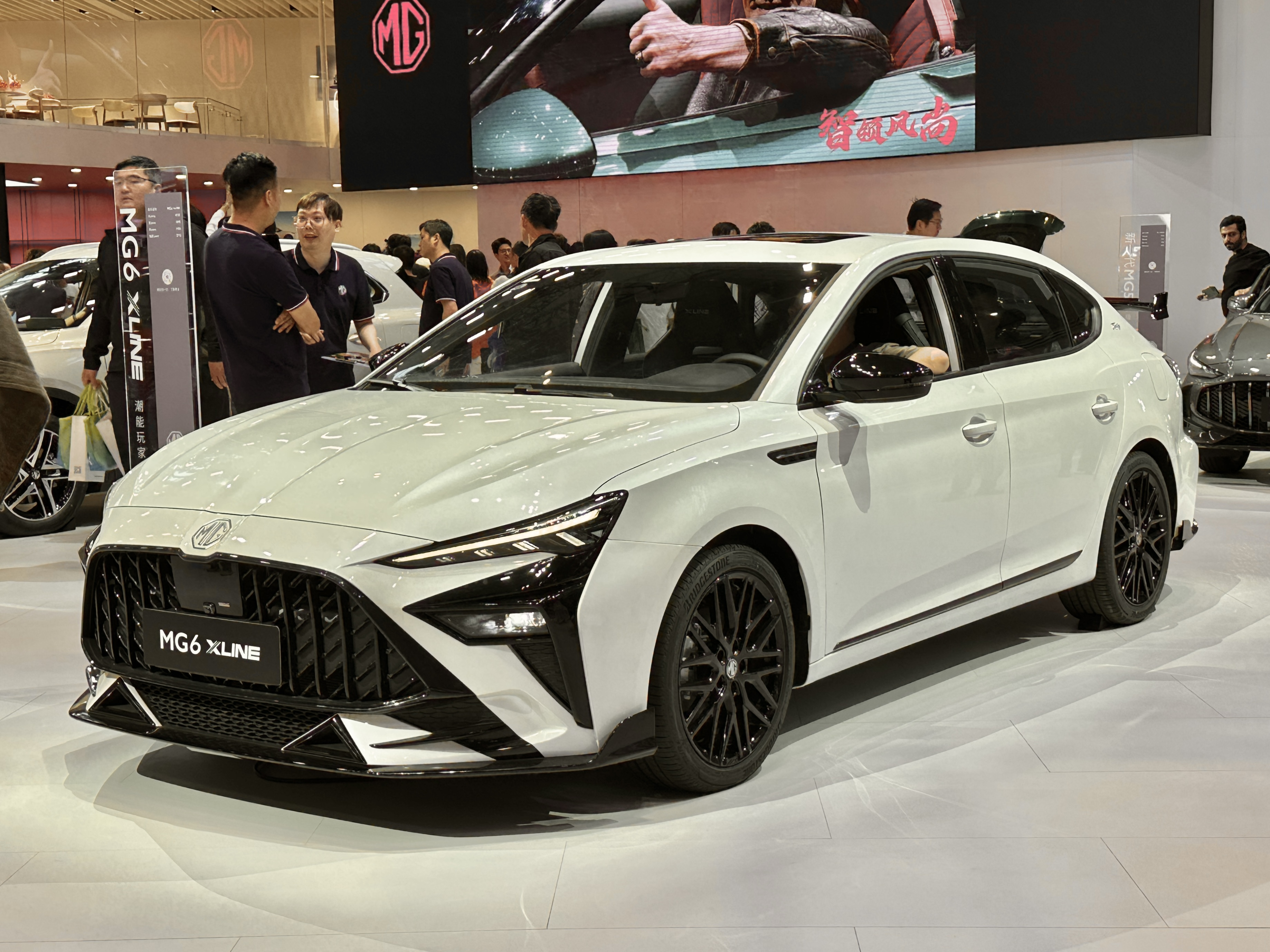

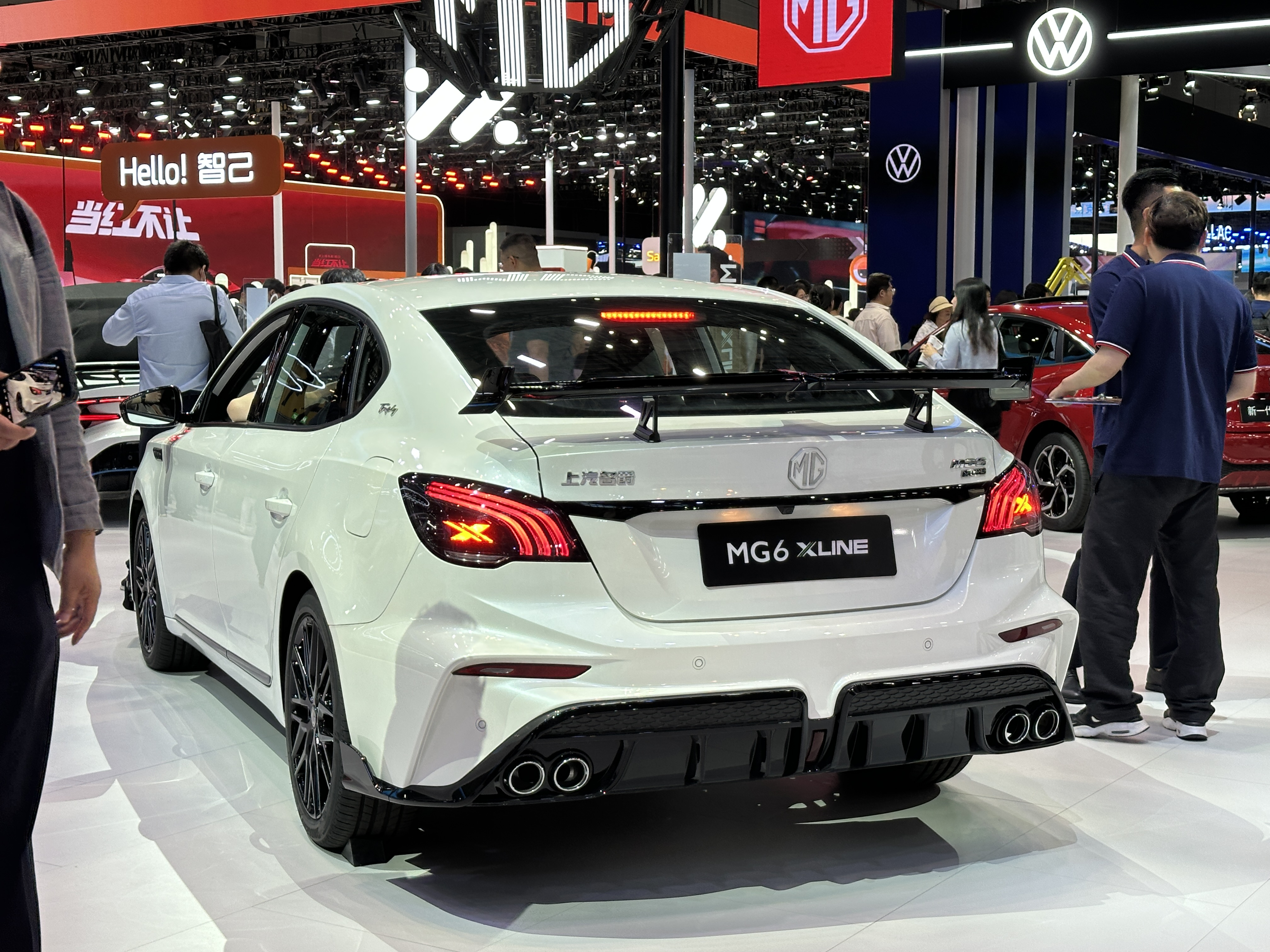
MG6 X-Line

The MG 6 was given another special model called the X-Line. It was launched at the 2023 Guangzhou Auto Show for the 2023 model year. The new features include a new bumper for a sportier feel while retaining the slimmer headlamps. Additional foglights were added and the large grille is retained from the MG 6 Pro. The rear taillights are LED and sport a black design while the rear bumper gets an added rear diffuser with oval exhaust tips. The taillight style also forms an X shape when illuminated. The X-Line still runs on the same 1.5 litre turbocharged petrol engine and 7 speed dual clutch automatic gearbox as standard.

Three exterior colour choices are available as standard: Pearlescent white, Shark Gray, and Pearlescent Black. The X-Line also gets one interior trim: black leather interior and bucket seats with green stitching and an X-Line logo stitched into the front headrests. The X-Line is priced at 123,800 yuan.

== Motorsport ==
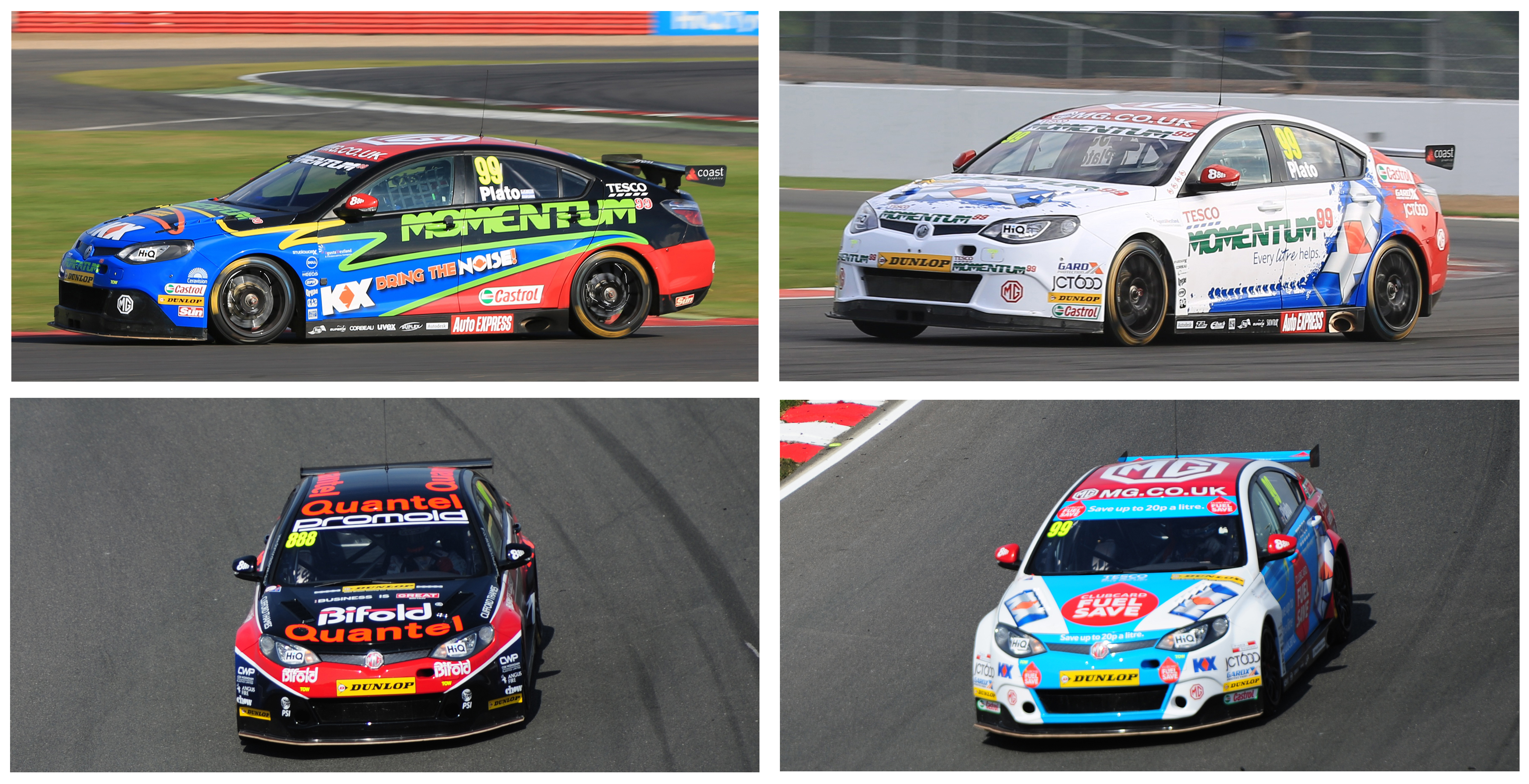
MG cars in the BTCC between 2012 and 2014

In January 2012, MG UK announced that it would enter the 2012 British Touring Car Championship. Triple 8 Race Engineering entered a pair of works MG6 GT models through the MG KX Momentum Racing name, driven by Jason Plato and Andy Neate. Plato ended the season in third place, with the car yet to find its foot in wet conditions.

The team returned in 2013 with Sam Tordoff replacing Neate in the second MG, who performed well in his debut year having joined through the KX Academy scheme. Plato once again came third, with Tordoff sixth. In 2014, MG won the Manufacturers' Championship to break Honda's four-year reign. After just three years of competition, the MG6 GT sealed the title by 95 points at the season finale at Brands Hatch.

Drivers Plato and Tordoff racked up seven wins and twenty podiums in the thirty-race calendar, as Plato finished second in the Drivers' Championship behind Colin Turkington, while Tordoff finished seventh. The season of 2014 also saw a third Triple Eight maintained MG6 GT on the grid, driven by Marc Hynes, who finished his début season in 18th.

For the campaign of 2015, MG returned with a new driver line-up of champion of 2013, Andrew Jordan and Jack Goff; both drivers left prior to the 2016 season. On 8 March 2016, Triple Eight Racing confirmed that Josh Cook and Ashley Sutton would drive for the team in the 2016 British Touring Car Championship.

MG6 BTCC drivers to date have been:

Year	Team	Drivers
2012	MG KX Momentum Racing	Jason Plato, Andy Neate
2013	MG KX Momentum Racing	Jason Plato, Sam Tordoff
2014	MG KX Clubcard Fuel Save	Jason Plato, Sam Tordoff
2014	Quantel BiFold Racing	Marc Hynes
2015	MG Triple Eight Racing	Andrew Jordan, Jack Goff
2016	MG RCIB Insurance Racing	Josh Cook, Ashley Sutton
2017	MG RCIB Insurance Racing	Árón Taylor-Smith, Daniel Lloyd, Josh Cook
2018	AmD with AutoAid/RCIB Insurance Racing	Rory Butcher, Tom Boardman, Ant Whorton-Eales, Glynn Geddie, Josh Caygill
2019	Excelr8 Motorsport	Rob Smith, Sam Osborne

A concept for a new TCR spec MG6 was announced on 14 April 2019. Two new MG6 X-Power TCR cars debuted in the 2019 TCR China round at Zhejiang International Circuit in the third round driven by Rodolfo Avila and Zhendong Zhang as invitation entries.

The cars took third and fourth places at Ningbo International Circuit. The car was officially homologated to compete in the inaugural FIA Motorsport Games Touring Car Cup on 1–3 November, the British team car run by AmDTuning.Com driven by Rory Butcher and the Chinese by MG Motor driven by Zhang, with Butcher finishing a best fourth in race 2. Two cars will compete in the 2020 TCR Asia Series with Team MG X-Power monitoring the WTCR with hopes of entering the car in the championship.

== Sales ==
Year	China	Thailand
2014		204
2015		367
2016		1,055
2017		433
2023	5,212	
2024	1,337	
2025	779	
