= Roewe 550 =

Large family car

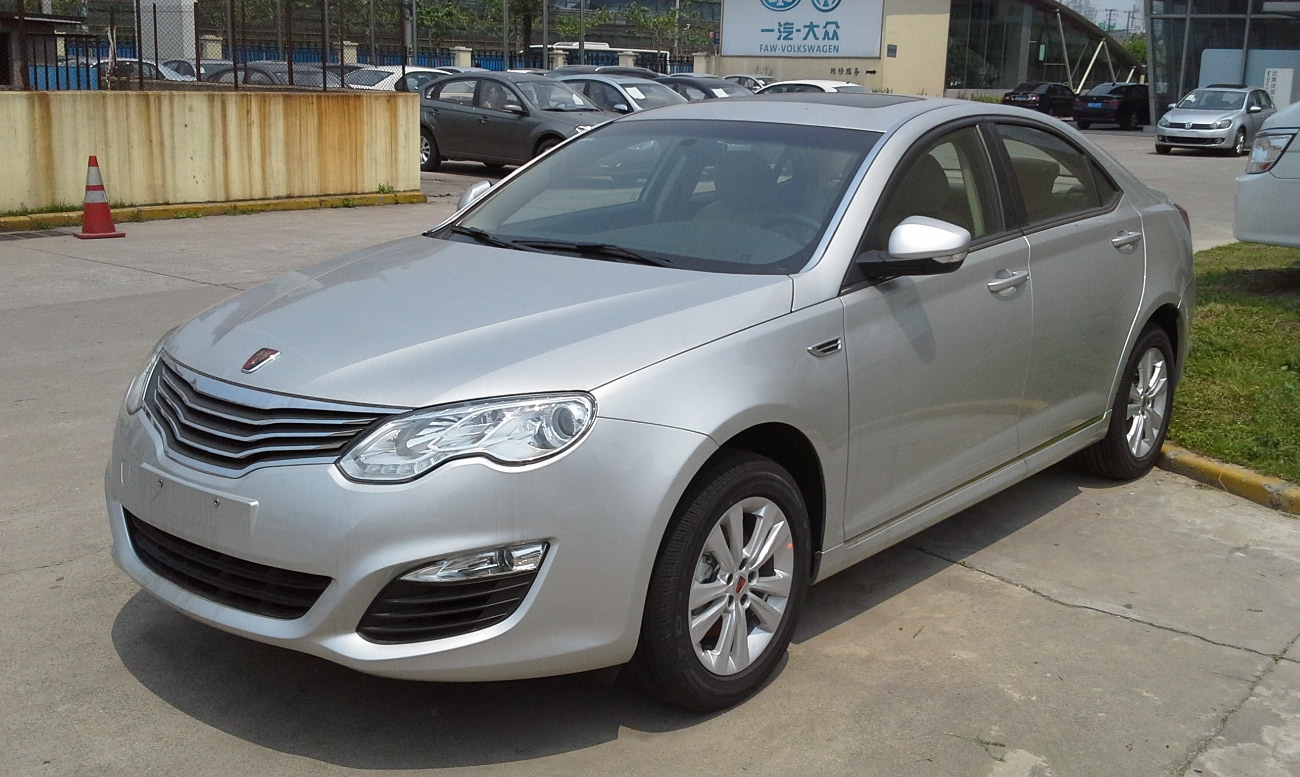

Overview
- Manufacturer: Roewe (SAIC Motor)
- Also called: MG 550; MG 6
- Production: 2008–2014
- Assembly: China: Lingang, Shanghai
- Designer: Anthony Williams-Kenny

Body and chassis
- Class: Large family car (D)
- Body style: 4-door saloon
- Layout: FF layout
- Related: MG 6

Powertrain
- Engine: 1.8 L Kavachi I4 (petrol); 1.8 L Kavachi I4 (turbo petrol); 1.5 L 15S4C VTi-Tech I4 (petrol PHEV; e550)
- Electric motor: 67 kW (89.8 hp) AC Synchronous Motor
- Transmission: 5-speed manual; 5-speed automatic; 6-speed DCT; 2-speed automatic (e550)

Dimensions
- Wheelbase: 2,705 mm (106.5 in)
- Length: 4,640 mm (182.7 in) (2014); 4,624 mm (182.0 in) (2008–2013)
- Width: 1,827 mm (71.9 in)
- Height: 1,480 mm (58.3 in)

Chronology
- Successor: Roewe i6 MG GT; MG 6 (second generation)

The Roewe 550 is a large family car produced by Roewe in China, and was launched at the 2008 Beijing Motor Show. The 550 was reported to be derived from the MG Rover RDX60 project (itself based on the platform of the Rover 75) which was under development when MG Rover failed.

== Overview ==
The car, codenamed W261 during development, is the work of a joint Anglo Chinese collaboration with ex-Rover experts at consultancy firm Ricardo 2010 and SAIC had car development team. The 550 was previewed at the 2007 Shanghai Auto Show, in the form of the Roewe W2 concept car.

The drivetrain uses a 1.8 litre 160 bhp (119 kW; 162 PS) engine based on the Rover K engine with 2.0 litre turbo diesel forecast to join the range and a choice of five speed manual, or five speed automatic transmission.

The car features a high technology interior with digital instruments (the Roewe D5 DIGI-NEXT system) and the RMI (Roewe Multimedia Interface, the predecessor of the SAIC InkaNet 3G/4G interface which was later installed in Roewe 350, Roewe 360 and MG GT) digital multimedia interactive system, a multi functional audio and video entertainment system with Bluetooth hands free system, USB interface and GPS.

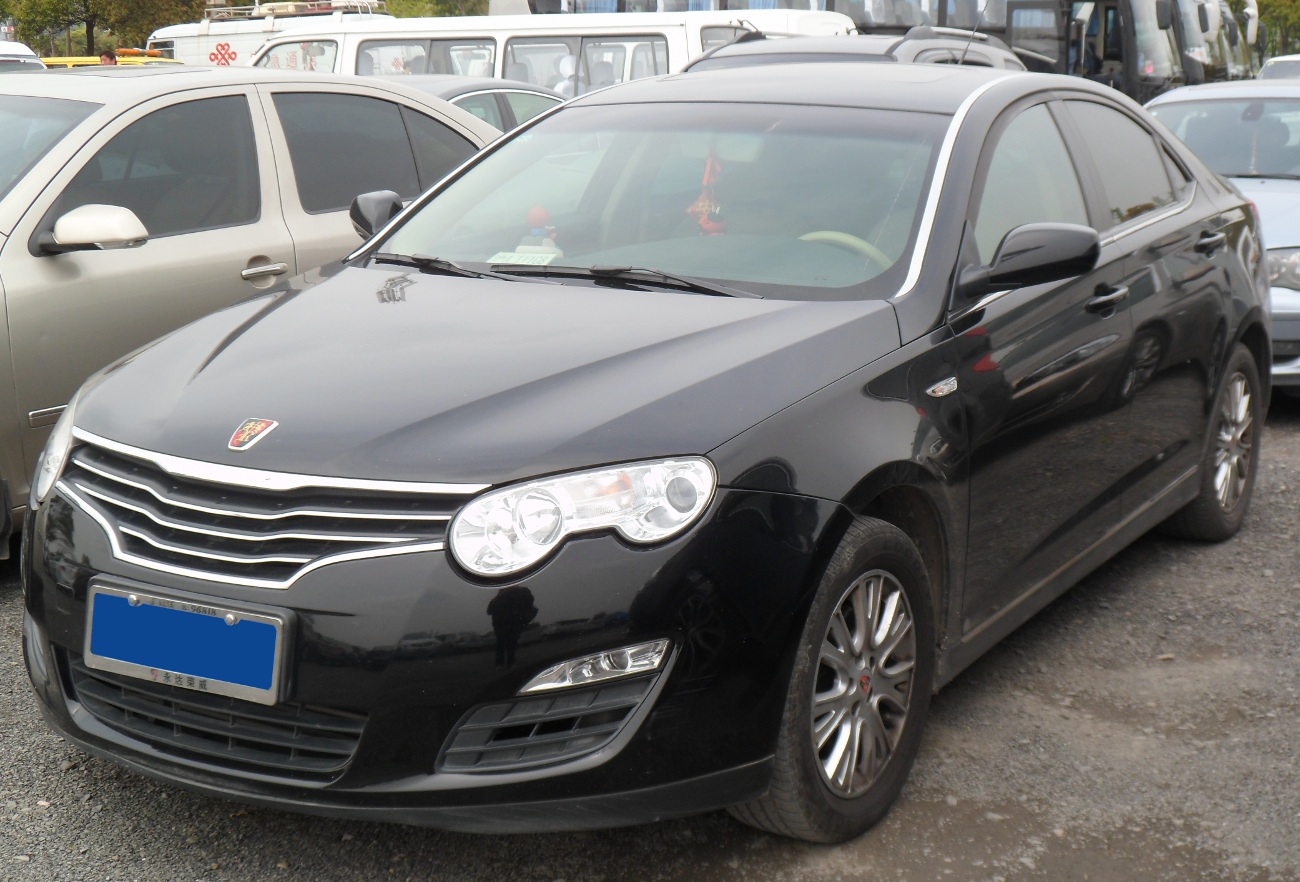
Pre facelift Roewe 550 (front).

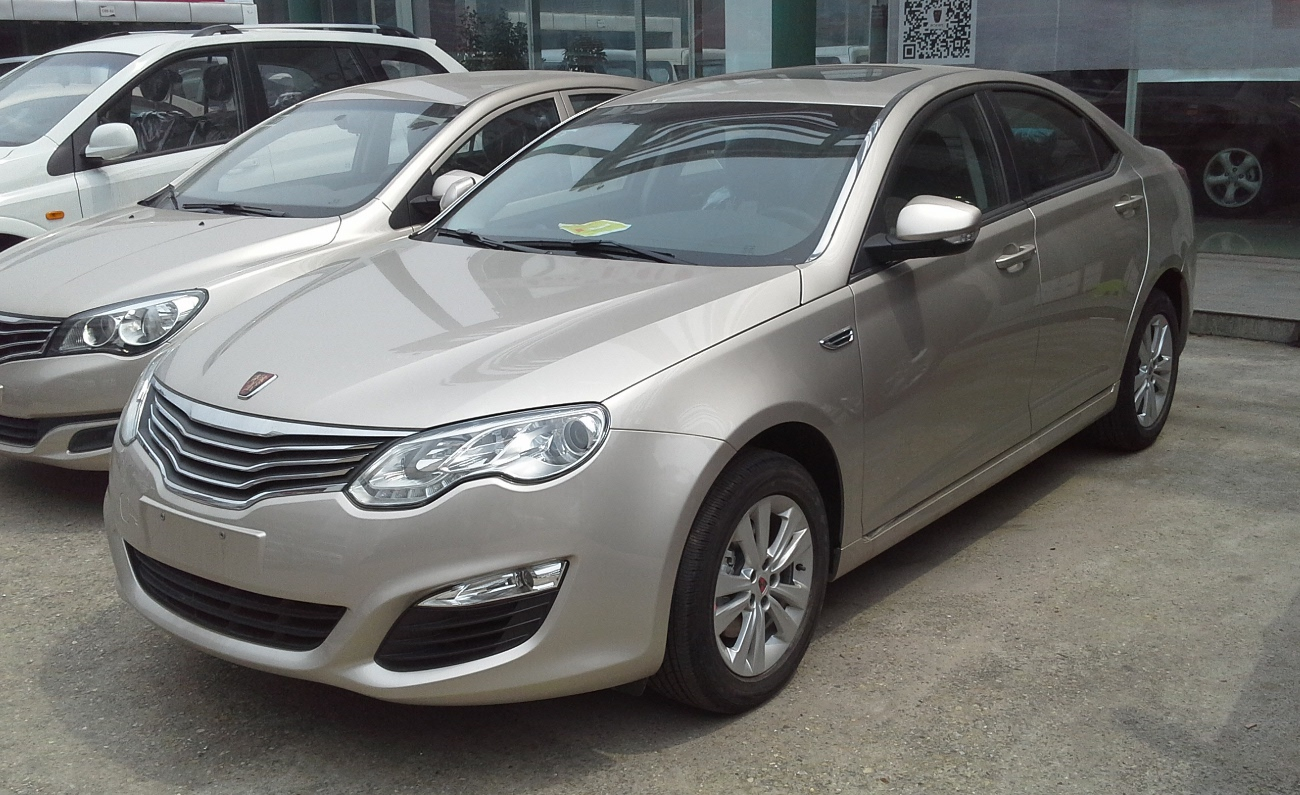
Post facelift Roewe 550 (front).

=== e550 Plug In Hybrid ===
The SAIC Roewe 550 PHEV is the plug-in hybrid version. Its 11.8 kWh LiFePO_{4} battery packs delivers an all-electric range of 58 km (36 mi). Retails sales began in China in November 2013.

Cumulative sales totaled 11,711 units through December 2015, of which 10,711 were sold throughout 2015.

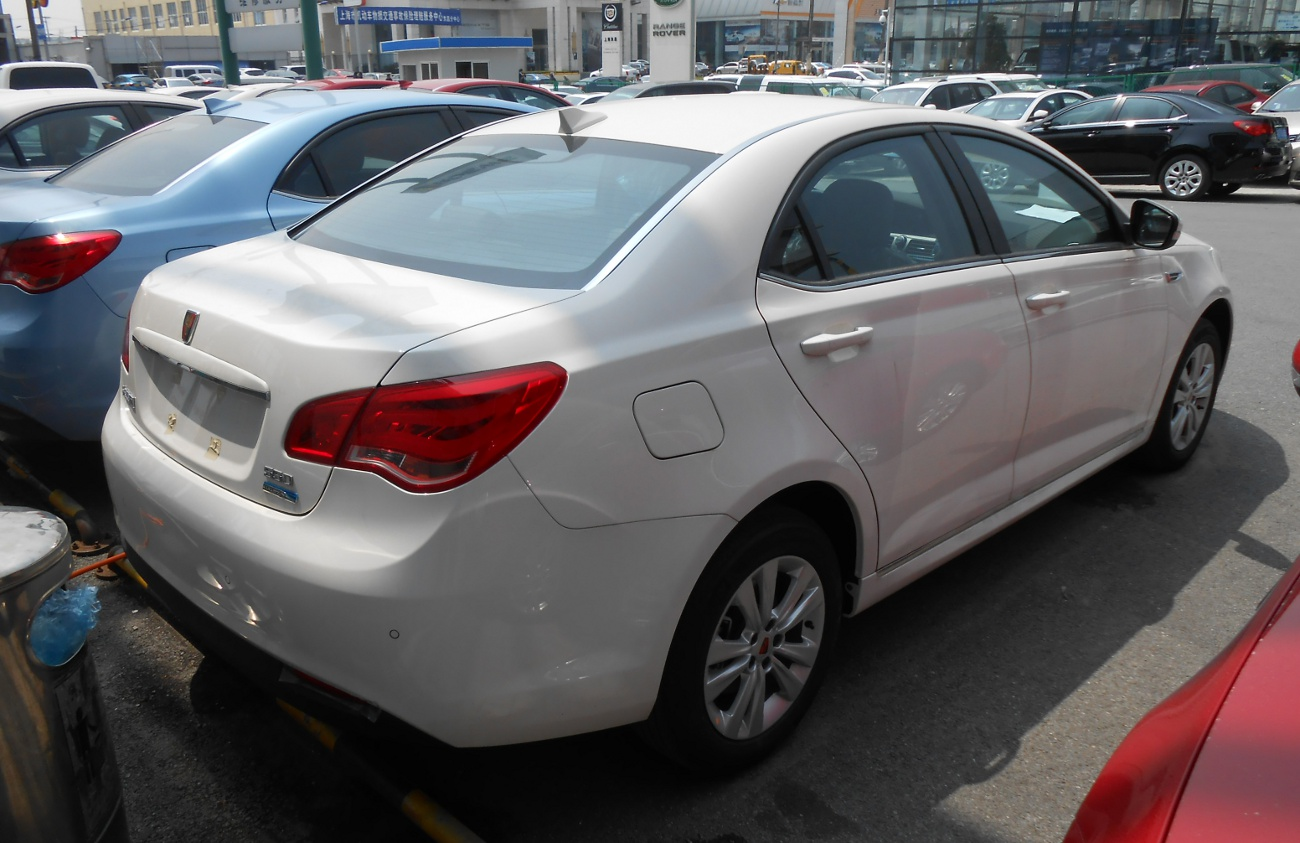
Post facelift Roewe 550 (rear).

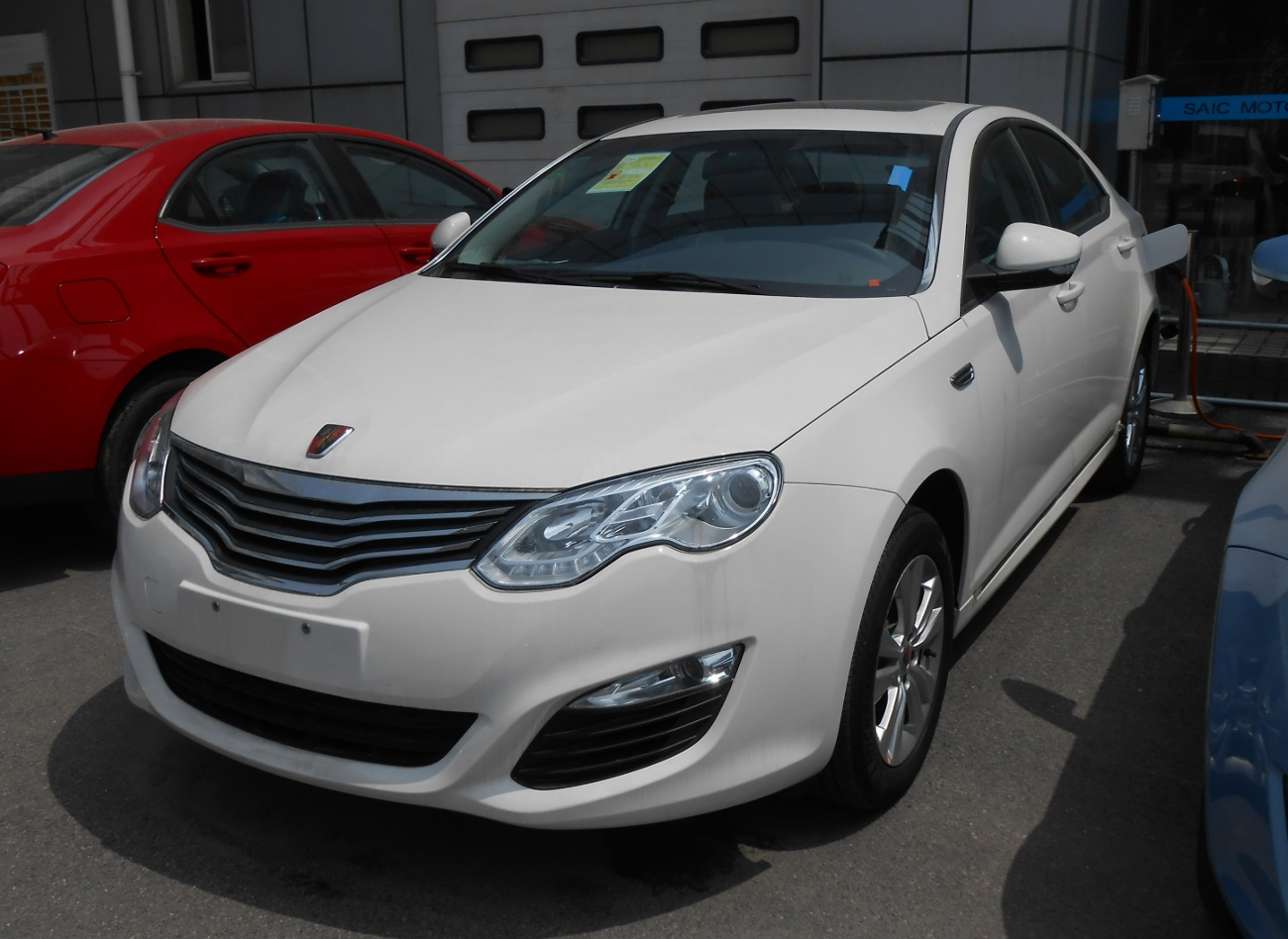
Roewe e550 plug-in hybrid.

=== MG 550 ===
In 2008, the Roewe 550 was launched in Chile, rebadged as the MG 550. It was also released in Iran in 2010 and released in Bahrain, Oman and UAE in 2011. A restyled hatchback version of the Roewe 550 was announced at the 2009 Shanghai Auto Show as the MG 6. The MG6 was imported into the United Kingdom up until May 2016, when it was discontinued following poor sales.

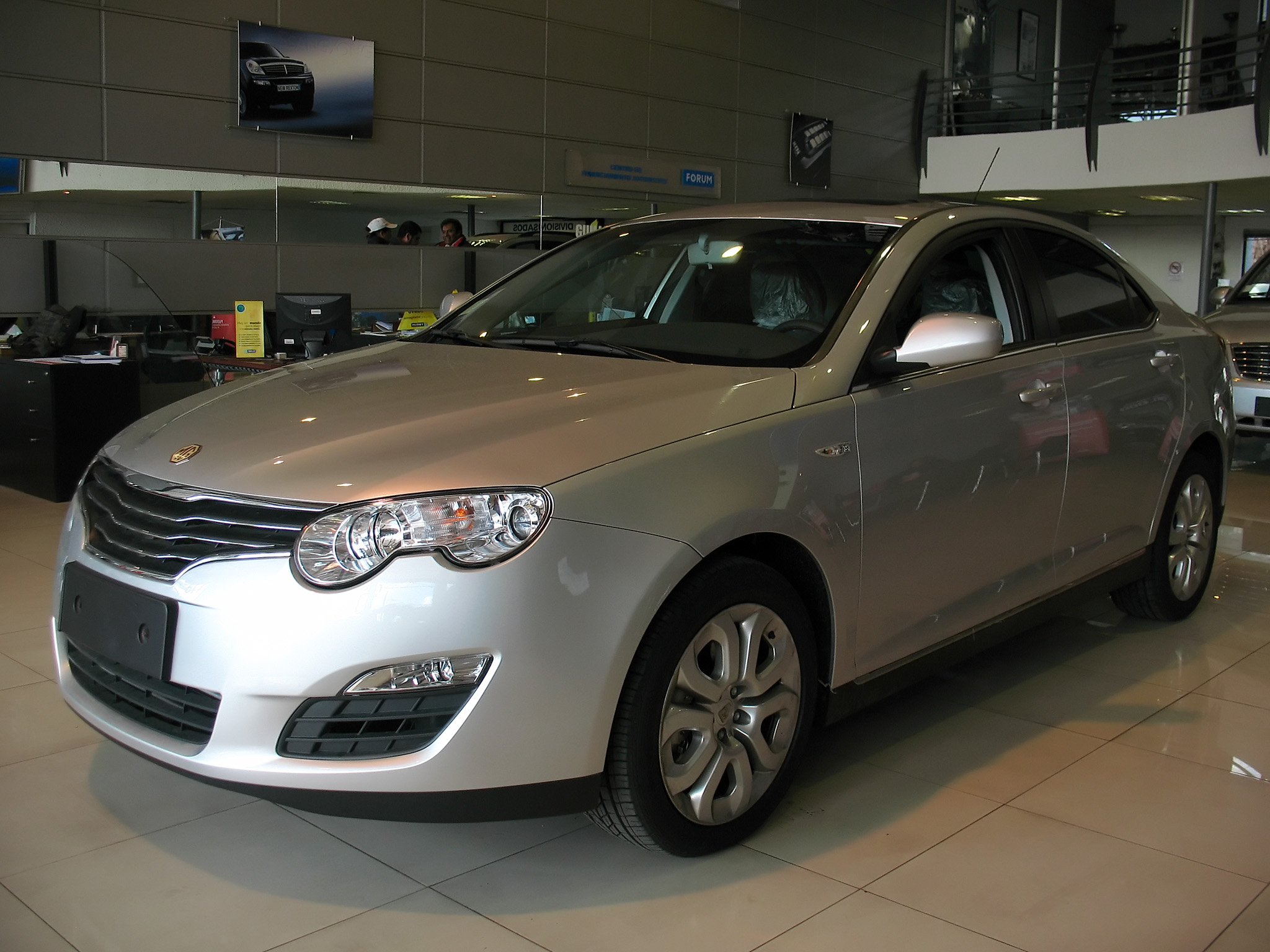
MG 550 (front).

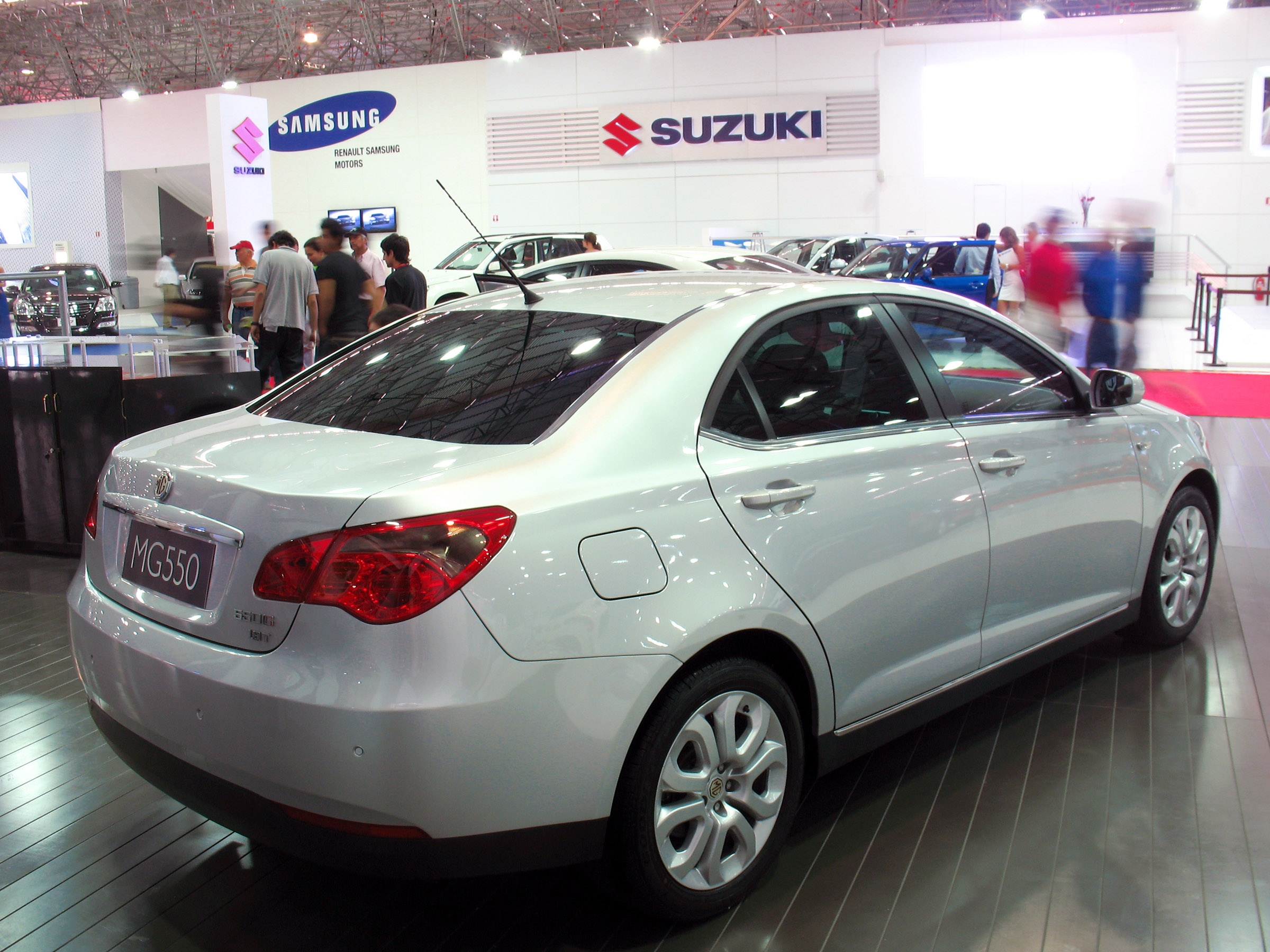
MG 550 (rear).
