= MG ZS (crossover) =

Subcompact crossover SUV

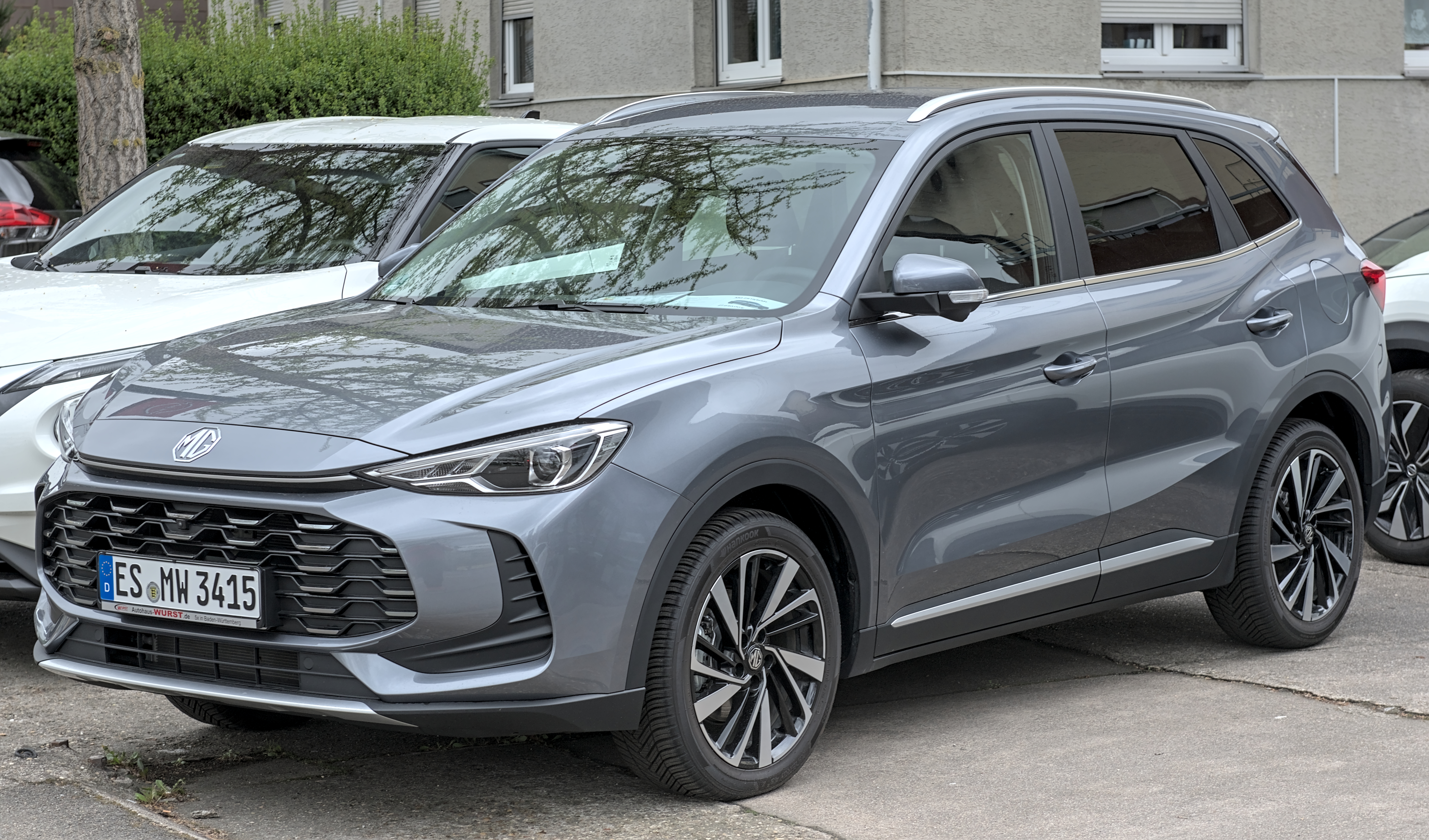
- Second generation ZS

Overview
- Manufacturer: MG Motor SAIC Motor
- Production: 2017–present

Body and chassis
- Class: Subcompact SUV (B-segment)
- Body style: 5-door crossover SUV
- Layout: Front-engine, front-wheel-drive

Chronology
- Successor: MGS5 EV / ES5 (EZS / ZS EV)

The MG ZS is a subcompact SUV produced by the Chinese automotive manufacturer SAIC Motor under the British MG marque. Announced at the 2016 Guangzhou Auto Show in China, the MG ZS is the second SUV to be produced under the MG marque after the MG GS. It is positioned below the larger HS, and above the smaller MG 3 hatchback. Since 2018, the ZS is available with a battery electric version called the ZS EV or in China, the EZS. In 2025, the hybrid version of the ZS was awarded Best Hybrid Car by British motoring magazine Carbuyer.

The ZS is currently the brand's best selling model in international markets. As of December 2023, global cumulative sales reached 999,612 units (including petrol and electric versions), higher than any other MG Motor models.

== First generation (ZS11; 2017) ==
First generation
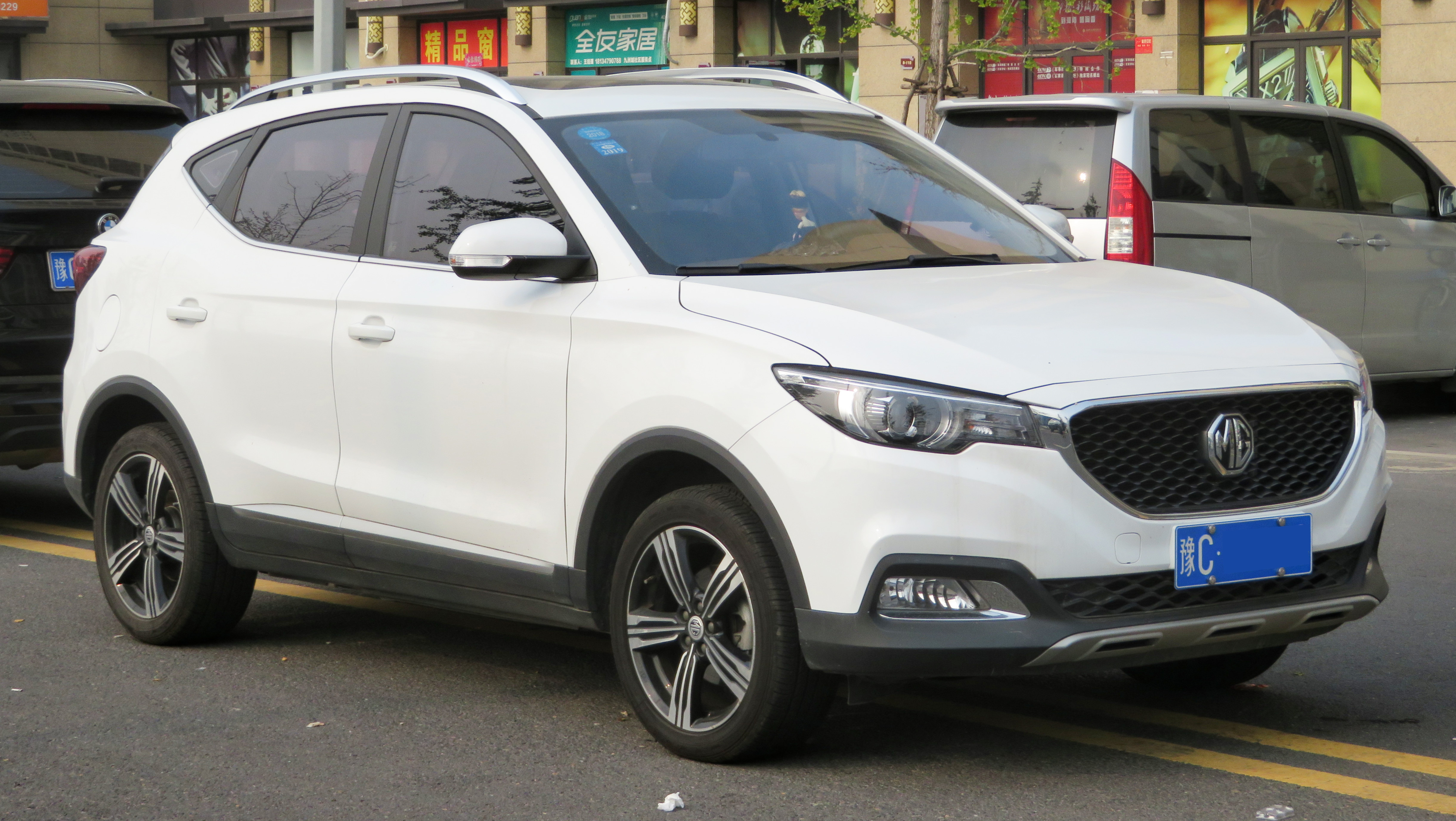
- 2018 MG ZS (pre-facelift, China)

Overview
- Model code: ZS11
- Also called: MG ZX (Peru; facelift, Chile); MG ZST (facelift, Middle East and Australia); MG Astor (petrol, India); MG VS (hybrid, Thailand)
- Production: 2017–2022 (China); 2017–present (export); 2021–2026 (India)
- Assembly: China: Zhengzhou, Henan; Lingang, Shanghai; Thailand: Laem Chabang (SAIC-CP); India: Halol (JSW MG Motor India); Taiwan: Taoyuan (CMC)

Body and chassis
- Related: Roewe RX3

Powertrain
- Engine: Petrol: 1.0 L GM/SAIC SGE T-GDI I3; 1.3 L GM/SAIC SGE T-GDI I3; 1.5 L NSE Plus I4; 1.5 L GM/SAIC SGE NSE Plus 15S4C I4; Petrol hybrid: 1.5 L 15S4C I4
- Electric motor: 95 PS; 94 hp (70 kW) permanent magnet synchronous (VS HEV)
- Power output: List: 107 PS; 106 hp (79 kW) (1.5); 113 PS; 111 hp (83 kW) (1.0 Turbo); 116 PS; 114 hp (85 kW) (1.5 15S4C); 163 PS; 161 hp (120 kW) (1.3 Turbo); 181 PS; 178 hp (133 kW) (VS HEV)
- Transmission: 5-speed manual; 4-speed automatic; 6-speed automatic; 6-speed DCT; CVT; e-CVT (VS HEV)
- Hybrid drivetrain: Parallel (VS HEV)

Dimensions
- Wheelbase: 2,585 mm (101.8 in)
- Length: 4,314–4,323 mm (169.8–170.2 in)
- Width: 1,809 mm (71.2 in)
- Height: 1,611–1,653 mm (63.4–65.1 in)
- Kerb weight: 1,258–1,318 kg (2,773–2,906 lb)

The ZS was launched in China in March 2017 and revealed at the 2017 Auto Shanghai Motor Show. It was also shown at the 2017 London Motor Show for the British market, and launched in Australia later that year.

The vehicle notably revives the name previously used for the MG ZS small family car which was produced by MG Rover between 2001 and 2005. Previously, MG planned to use the name MG XS for the vehicle in the United Kingdom to avoid confusion with the previous MG ZS, but this change of name was reverted shortly after its launch in the country. It was also introduced as the MG Astor in India in September 2021.

Sales of the ZS in the Chinese market ended since the 2022 model year, while exports are unaffected.

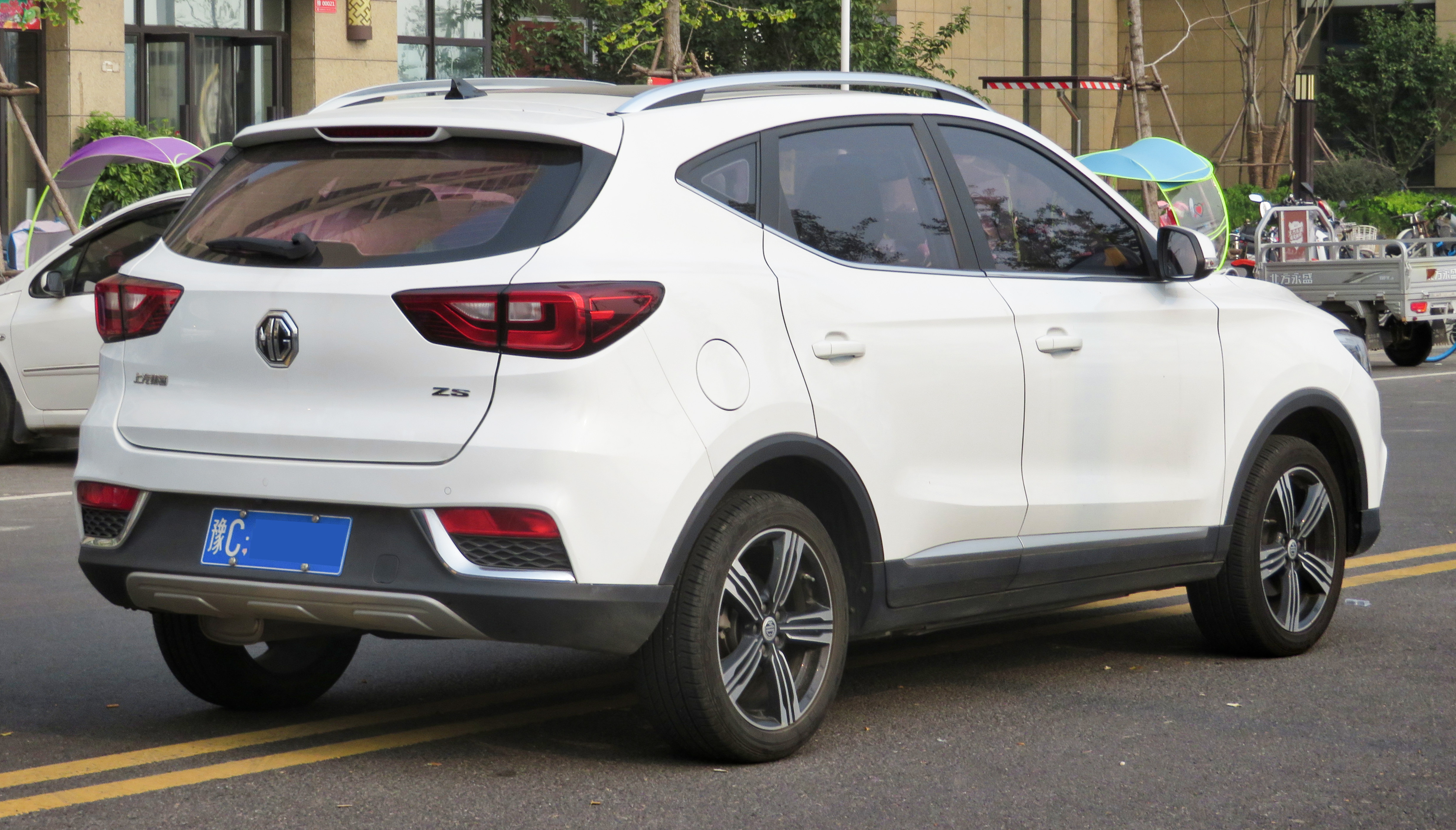
Rear view (pre-facelift, China)

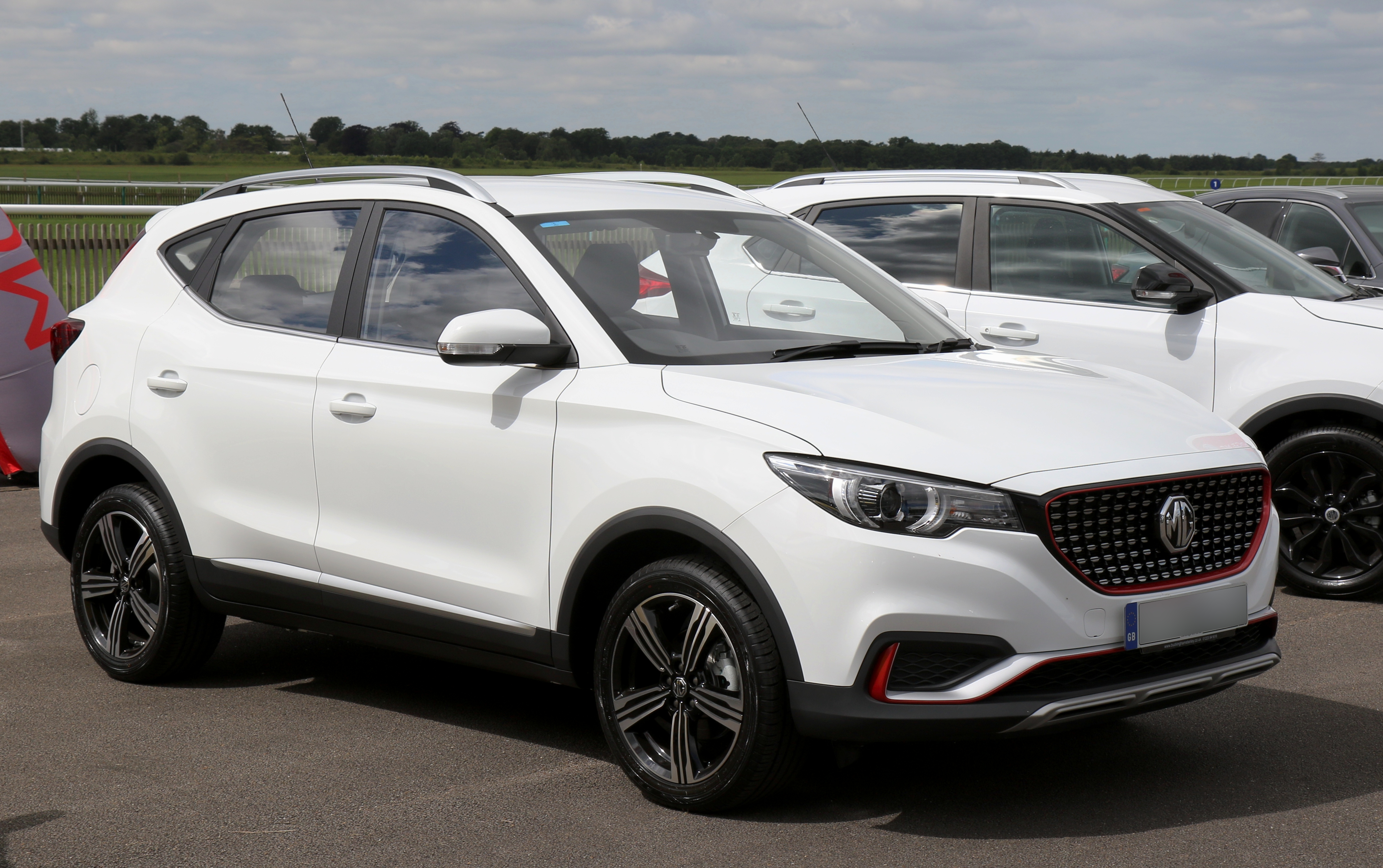
2019 MG ZS Limited Edition (pre-facelift, UK)

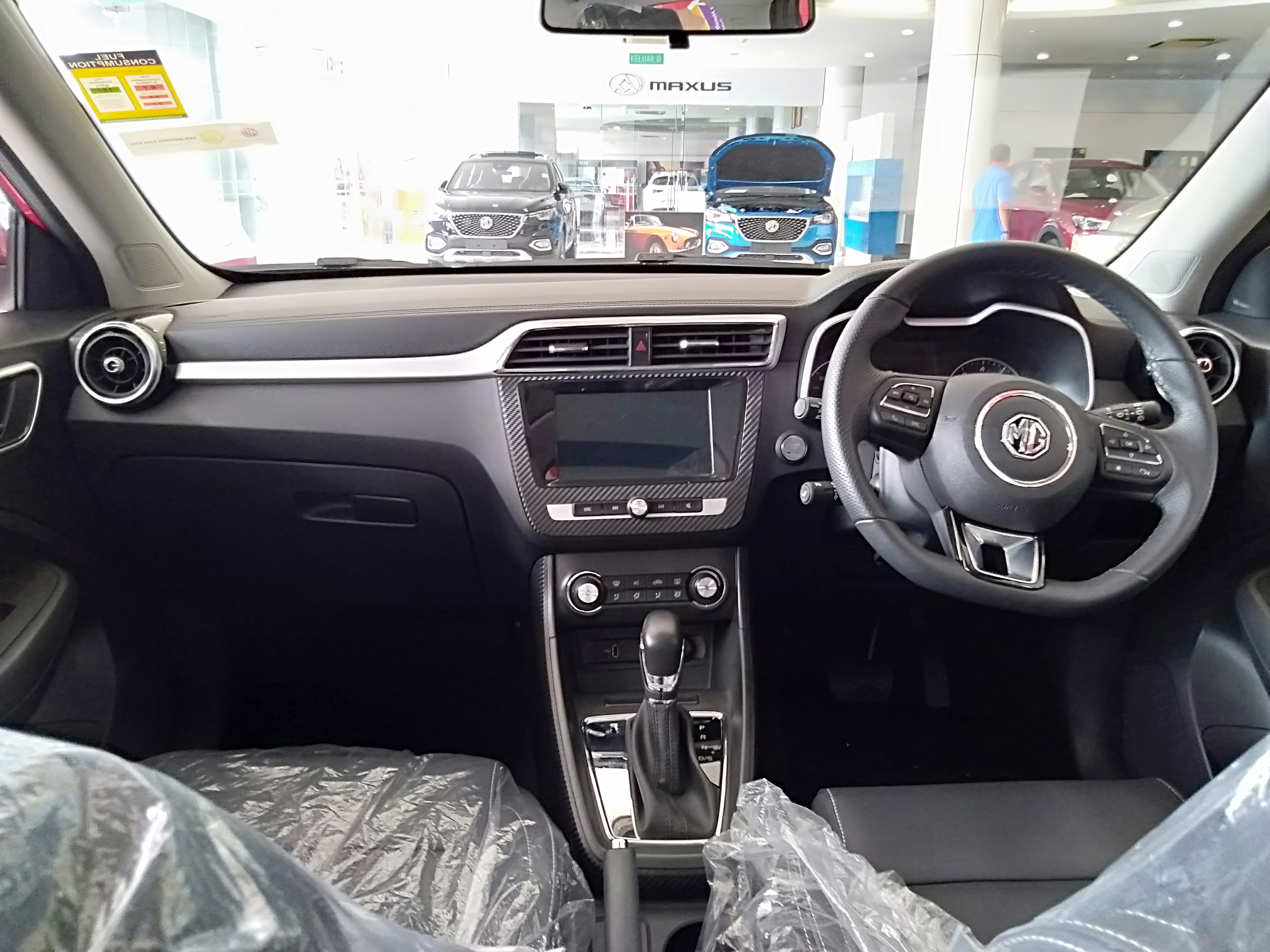
Interior (pre-facelift)

=== Facelift ===
In September 2019, the facelifted ZS was revealed in China at the Chengdu Motor Show. It features a redesigned front fascia with reshaped headlamps. At the rear, it received a redesigned rear bumper and taillamps. The interior received updated dashboard with a larger 10.1 inch infotainment screen with new 'Zebra 3.0' software, a new full LCD instrument cluster, and the mechanical parking has been replaced with an electronic parking brake.

The facelifted ZS features optional Level 2 autonomous safety features, such as lane-keeping aid and lane departure prevention, and an updated engine and transmission line-up.

The facelifted ZS was revealed on 24 March 2020 in Thailand, featuring 1.5-litre SAIC NetBlue Blue Core Power Technology I4 engine, eight speed CVT stepless, along with a package of driver assistance systems, six airbags and a 360-degree view monitor.

On 3 July 2020, the facelifted ZS was launched in the United Kingdom. It was shown to have a revised grille, new LED headlights, sportier front bumper and new front fog lights. The 1.5-litre engine with the five-speed manual gearbox produces 105 hp (106 PS; 78 kW) and 141 N⋅m (14.4 kg⋅m; 104 lb⋅ft) of torque. 0–60 mph (0–97 km/h) takes 10.4 seconds, with a top speed of 109 mph (175 km/h).

In September 2020, MG launched the ZS facelift as the MG ZST in Australia. The 'T' letter denotes the newly introduced 1.3-litre turbo petrol engine producing 115 kW (156 PS; 154 hp) and 230 N⋅m (23 kg⋅m; 170 lb⋅ft) with 6-speed automatic gearbox and MG Pilot safety features.

In September 2021, the facelift version was introduced in India as the MG Astor and will be sold alongside the ZS EV. Several adjustments were made for the Indian market, such as a redesigned grille.

In 2023, the MG ZS in facelift model were launched in the Taiwan market by importing to the country from China by China Motor Corporation, and later being locally assembled. The Taiwanese-market ZS engine is only 1.5-litre naturally aspirated engine mated to a CVT. It has a Level 2 driver assistance (MG Pilot) equipment in a single specification.

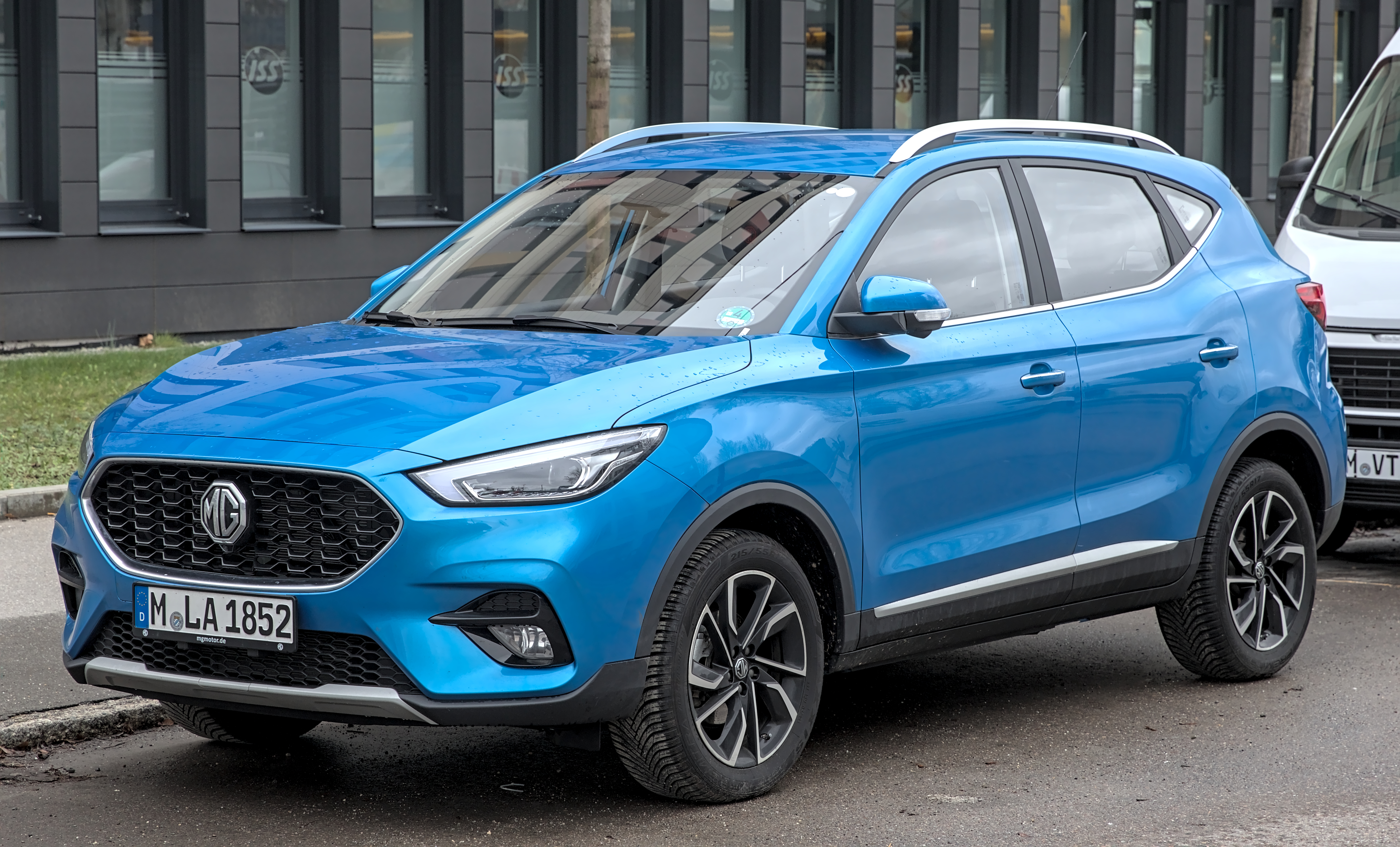
2020 MG ZS (facelift)

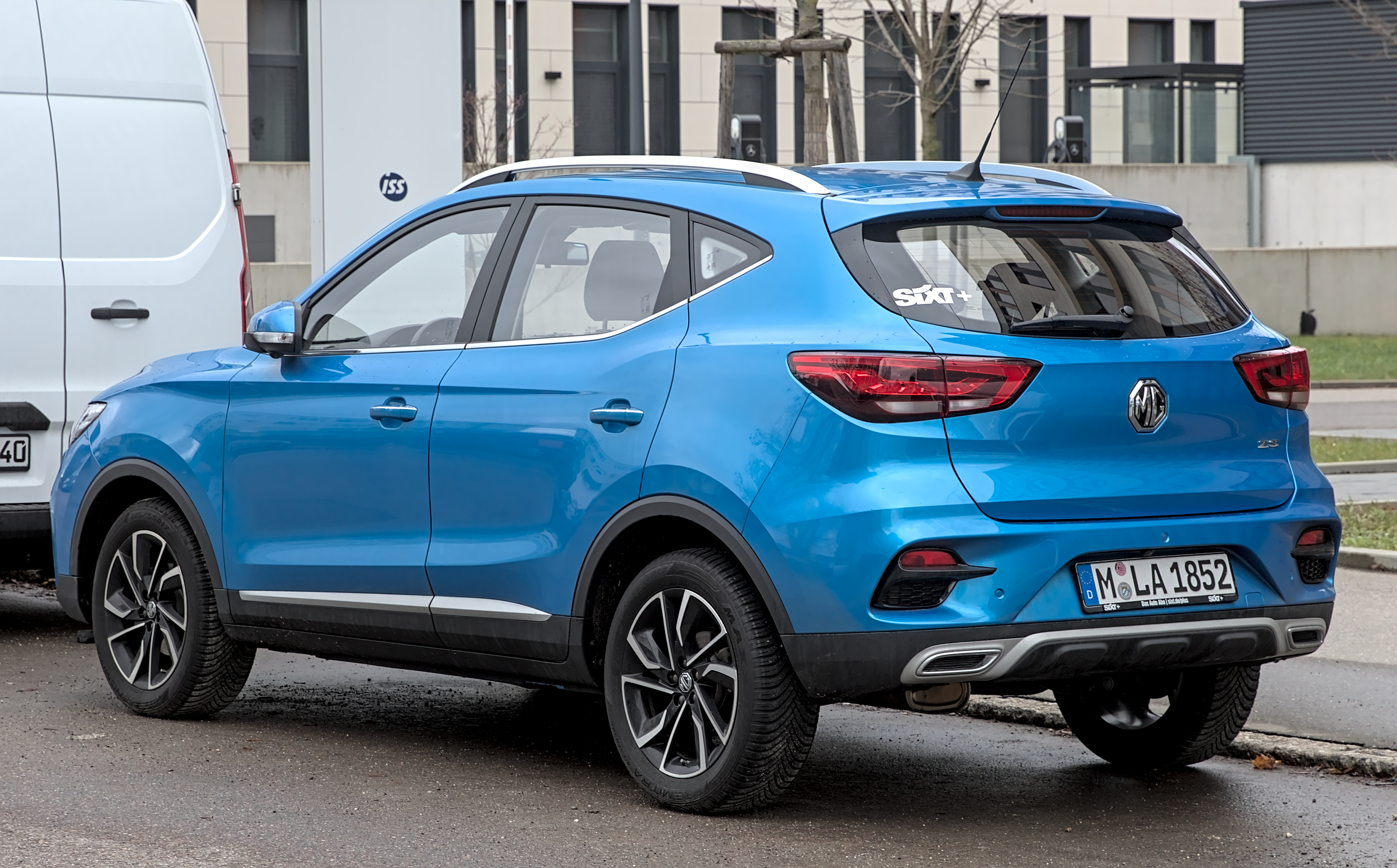
2020 MG ZS (facelift)

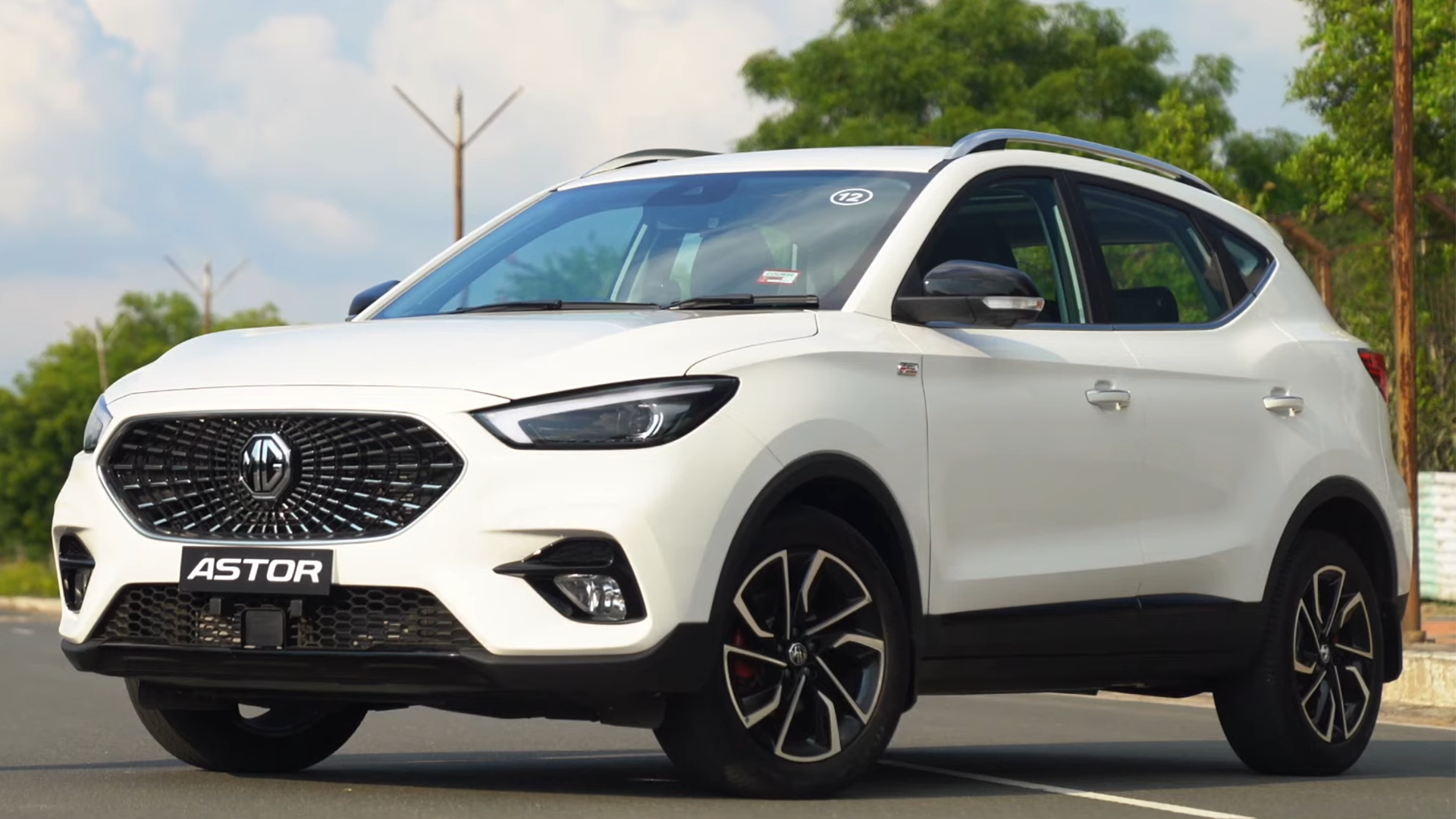
2021 MG Astor (India)

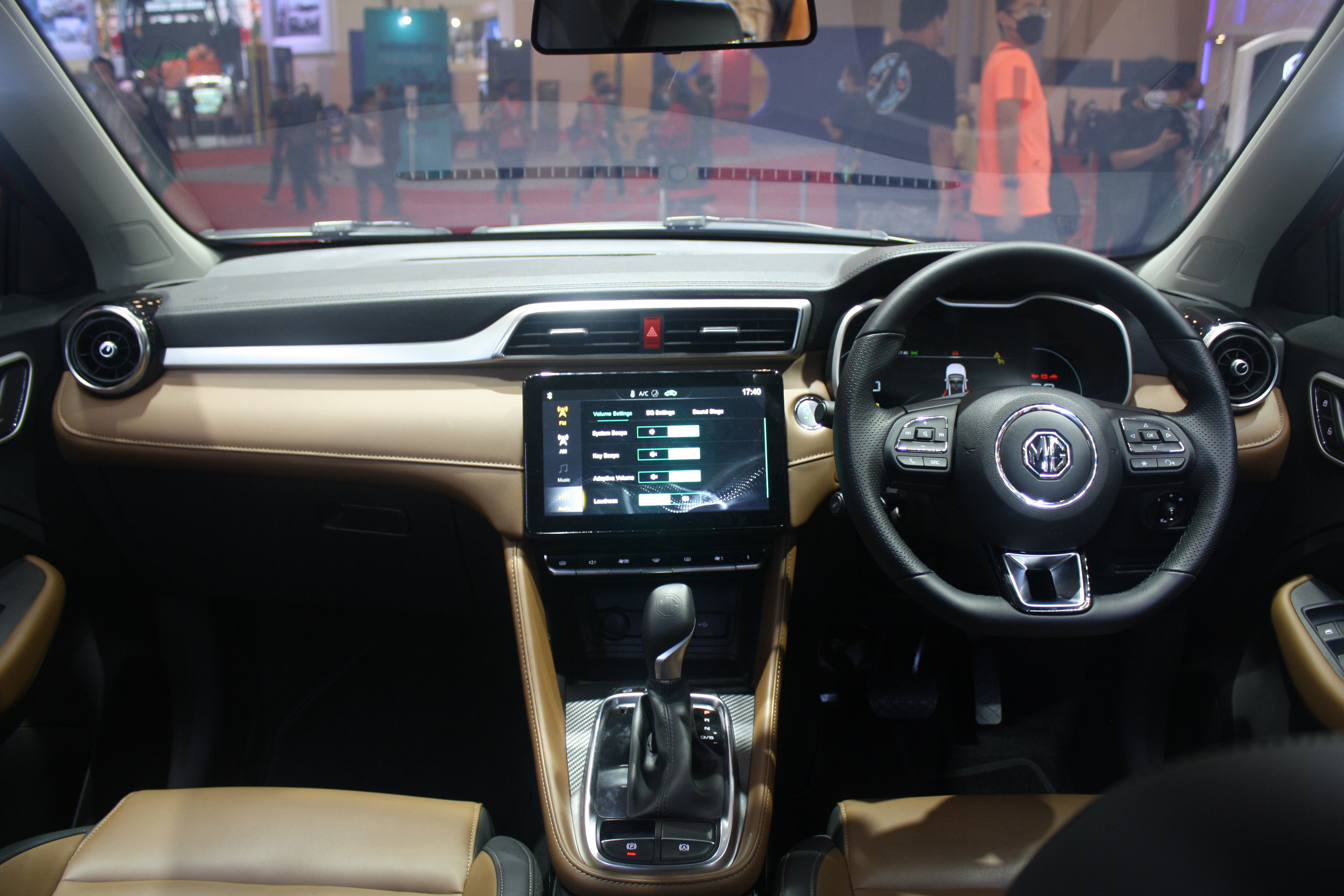
Interior (facelift)

=== Engines ===
The ZS has two petrol engines options, an updated SMTC developed version of the naturally aspirated 1.5-litre as found in the MG3, known in this guise as the NSE Plus (formerly just NSE) the updated engine is tuned differently in each market based on locally applicable emission regulations.

In China, for example, the engine is tuned to deliver 120 PS (118 hp; 88 kW) and 150 N⋅m (15.3 kg⋅m; 111 lb⋅ft) torque. In the United Kingdom, where the emission regulations are more strict, the engine delivers 106 PS (105 hp; 78 kW) and 141 N⋅m (14.4 kg⋅m; 104 lb⋅ft) of torque.

The second engine is a new turbocharged three cylinder engine, developed by SAIC in conjunction with General Motors. In China, it produces 125 PS (123 hp; 92 kW) and 175 N⋅m (17.8 kg⋅m; 129 lb⋅ft) torque, but in the United Kingdom, it produces 111 PS (109 hp; 82 kW) and 160 N⋅m (16.3 kg⋅m; 118 lb⋅ft) torque.

Specs
| Model | Years | Engine | Transmission | Power | Torque | 0–100 km/h (62 mph) (Official) | Top speed |
|---|---|---|---|---|---|---|---|
| ZS | 2017–present | 1.5L I4 | 5-speed manual | 88 kW (120 PS; 118 hp) at 6,000 rpm | 150 N⋅m (111 lb⋅ft) at 4,500 rpm | 11.9s | 175 km/h (109 mph) |
| ZS | 2017–present | 1.5L I4 | CVT | 88 kW (120 PS; 118 hp) at 6,000 rpm | 150 N⋅m (111 lb⋅ft) at 4,500 rpm | 12.8s | 170 km/h (106 mph) |
| ZST | 2017–present | 1.3L Turbo I3 | 6-speed automatic | 120 kW (163 PS; 161 hp) at 5,200–5,600 rpm | 230 N⋅m (170 lb⋅ft) at 1,800–4,400 rpm | 9.8s | 185 km/h (115 mph) |

=== Markets ===
==== Asia ====
===== India =====
The vehicle made its Indian debut on 11 October 2021 as the MG Astor, a year after the ZS EV. Four trim levels are available: Style, Super, Smart, and Sharp. Engine options includes a 1.5-litre petrol engine paired with either a 5-speed manual or 4-speed automatic, or a 1.3-litre turbocharged petrol engine paired only with a 6-speed automatic.

On 16 October 2026, MG Motor India reportedly discontinued the MG Astor in the Indian market, according to dealer sources, after five years on sale amid weak sales; the company is reportedly developing a new mid-size SUV to replace it, expected to be based on SAIC's SIGMA platform and to launch in 2027.

===== Indonesia =====
The ZS was the first vehicle sold in Indonesia by MG under their newly established Indonesian subsidiary, MG Motor Indonesia. It was introduced in 5 March 2020, before went on sale in 24 March 2020. Imported from Thailand, initial variants for the ZS range were the Excite and Ignite. It is only available with a 1.5-litre naturally-aspirated petrol engine with 4-speed automatic.

The facelifted range was introduced in 9 September 2021, and went on sale in 15 September 2021. For the facelift, the Activate and Magnify variants were added to the range, with the former variant replacing the Excite variant.

In November 2021, a limited edition variant called the Liverpool FC Limited Edition was introduced with only 200 units were made, following MG's official partnership with the Liverpool Football Club. It was launched at the 28th Gaikindo Indonesia International Auto Show.

In February 2023, MG introduced another limited edition variant for the ZS; Dark Midnight Edition. Based on the Magnify type with only 100 units were made, it features blacked-out grille, wheels and 'MG' logo badgings, and a standard bodykit. All Dark Midnight Edition variants sold were exclusively painted in the Black Pearl color. It was launched at the 30th Indonesia International Motor Show.

In August 2023, another limited edition variant was introduced for the ZS; XPower. Limited to 100 units, the XPower sported the bodykit from the Chinese market 2022 ZS Sport. It was launched at the 30th Gaikindo Indonesia International Auto Show.

===== Philippines =====
The MG ZS was launched in the Philippines on 18 October 2018, as part of the MG's re-entry to the country under a new distributor The Covenant Car Company Incorporated (TCCI).

In October 2021, the facelifted ZS debuted in the Philippines, with the introduction of a flagship ZS Trophy variant. Three trim levels are available for the regular ZS: Style, Style Plus, and Alpha; powered by a 1.5-litre petrol engine, paired with either a 5-speed manual or 4-speed automatic.

===== Taiwan =====
The ZS was launched in Taiwan on 31 August 2023, by importing to the country from China by China Motor Corporation, and later the unit is locally assembled. Offered in a sole variant, it is powered by a 1.5-litre petrol engine paired to a CVT and is equipped MG Pilot 2.0 autonomous driving features.

===== Thailand =====
The ZS was launched in Thailand on 27 November 2017. The facelifted ZS range debuted in Thailand in March 2020. It is powered by a 1.5-litre petrol engine, with 4 trim levels: C+, D, X, and V.

===== Vietnam =====
The ZS was launched in Vietnam on 17 July 2020, with three trim levels: Standard, Comfort and Luxury; it is powered by a 1.5-litre petrol engine paired to a CVT.

In January 2021, the facelifted ZS debuted in Vietnam, with the Standard trim being dropped.

==== Europe ====
The ZS made its UK introduction in November 2017, with three trim levels available: Explore, Excite and Exclusive. Engine options are a 1.5-litre petrol engine paired to a 5-speed manual, and a 1.0-litre turbocharged petrol engine paired to a 6-speed manual and automatic. The facelifted ZS went on sale in the UK in July 2020, with the base trim 'Explore' dropped.

==== Mexico ====
The ZS was introduced alongside the MG 5 and HS in Mexico on 22 October 2020, marking the return of the MG marque to the Mexican market after 15 years. At launch, two trim levels are available: Style and Excite. All variants are powered by a 1.5-litre petrol engine paired to either a 5-speed manual or CVT (4-speed automatic used on pre-facelift models).

In November 2022, the facelifted ZS debuted in Mexico, with a new top trim called Elegance, available with the colour pack.

==== Middle East ====
The ZS was launched in the GCC countries in January 2018. It is powered by a 1.5-litre petrol engine, it is available in three trim levels; STD, MID and LUX. The facelifted ZS was launched as the ZST in October 2020. The 1.3-litre turbocharged engine was added to the facelifted ZS, it is available in three trim levels; the 1.5-litre engine are STD and LUX and the 1.3-turbocharged engine is LUX.

==== Oceania ====
===== Australia =====
The ZS was launched in Australia on 23 November 2017, with three trim levels available at launch: Core, Soul, and Essence, later on, the Core and Soul trim levels were renamed to Excite and Excite Plus trim levels. In October 2021, the ZS range was reduced to the sole Excite trim. Engine options includes a 1.5-litre petrol engine and a 1.0-litre turbocharged petrol.

The ZST debuted in Australia on 1 September 2020, it is available in four trim levels: Core, Vibe, Excite, and Essence.

In 2021, 2022 and 2023, the MG ZS was the best-selling small SUV in Australia.

===== New Zealand =====
The ZS was launched in New Zealand on 25 February 2019, as part of MG's re-entry to New Zealand. At launch, two trim levels are available: Excite and Essence. Two engine options are available: a 1.5-litre petrol (for Excite) and a 1.0-litre turbocharged petrol (for Essence).

The ZST debuted in New Zealand on 1 September 2020, with two trim levels: Excite and Essence.

==== South Africa ====
The ZS was launched in South Africa on 17 December 2024, marking the return of the MG marque to the South African market after 8 years. At launch, two trim levels are available: Comfort and Luxury, it is powered by a 1.5-litre petrol engine paired to a 4-speed automatic.

=== MG VS ===
A hybrid electric version was released in Thailand in July 2022 as the MG VS HEV. The VS features a redesigned front fascia and an updated dashboard design adapted from the Chinese market Roewe Lomemo. Total system output is rated at 177 PS (175 hp; 130 kW). In Thailand, two trim levels are available for the VS: D and X. The VS was launched in Indonesia on 21 March 2024 in a sole variant, imported from Thailand, becoming the least expensive hybrid vehicle on sale in Indonesia.

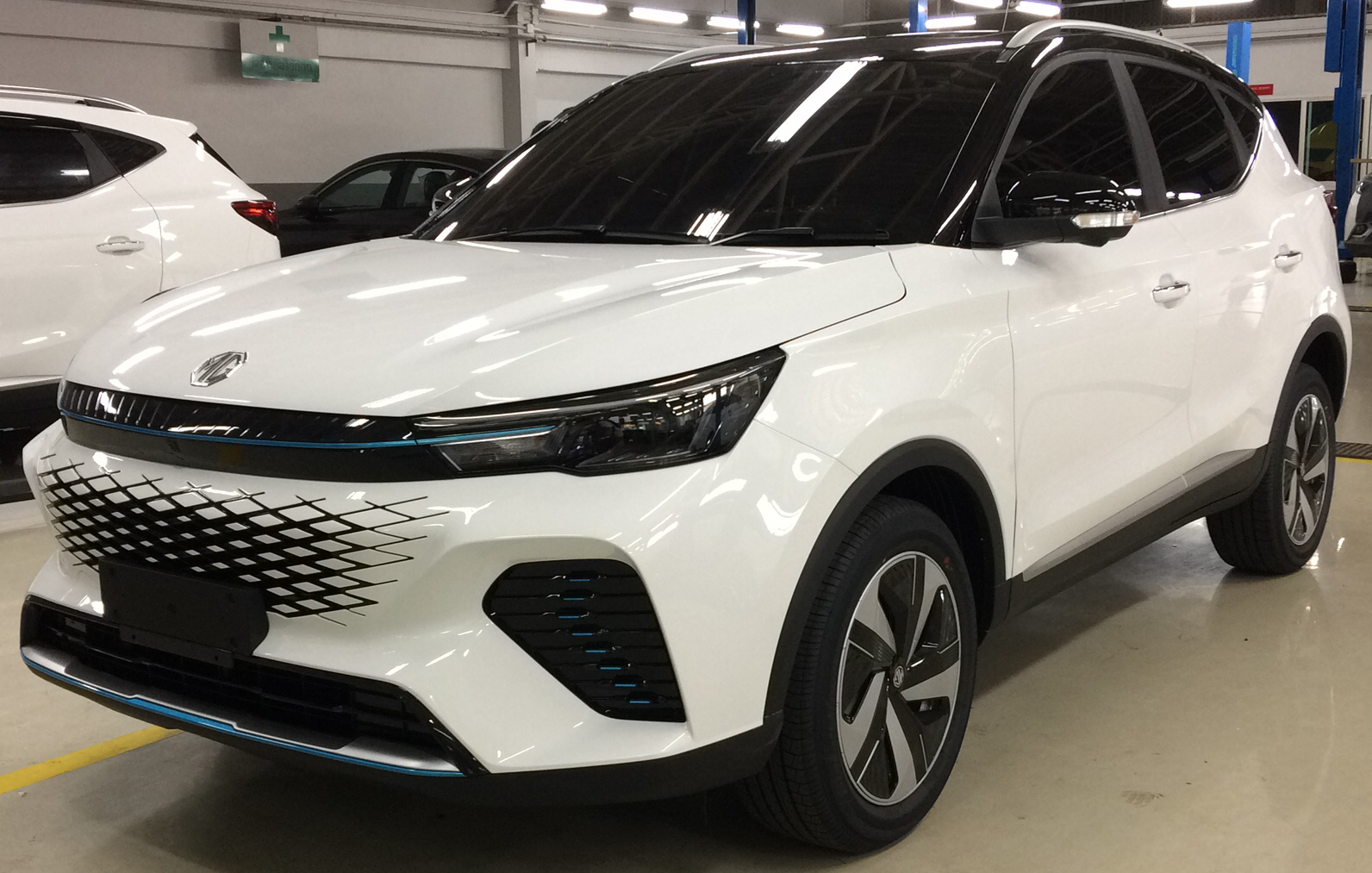
MG VS

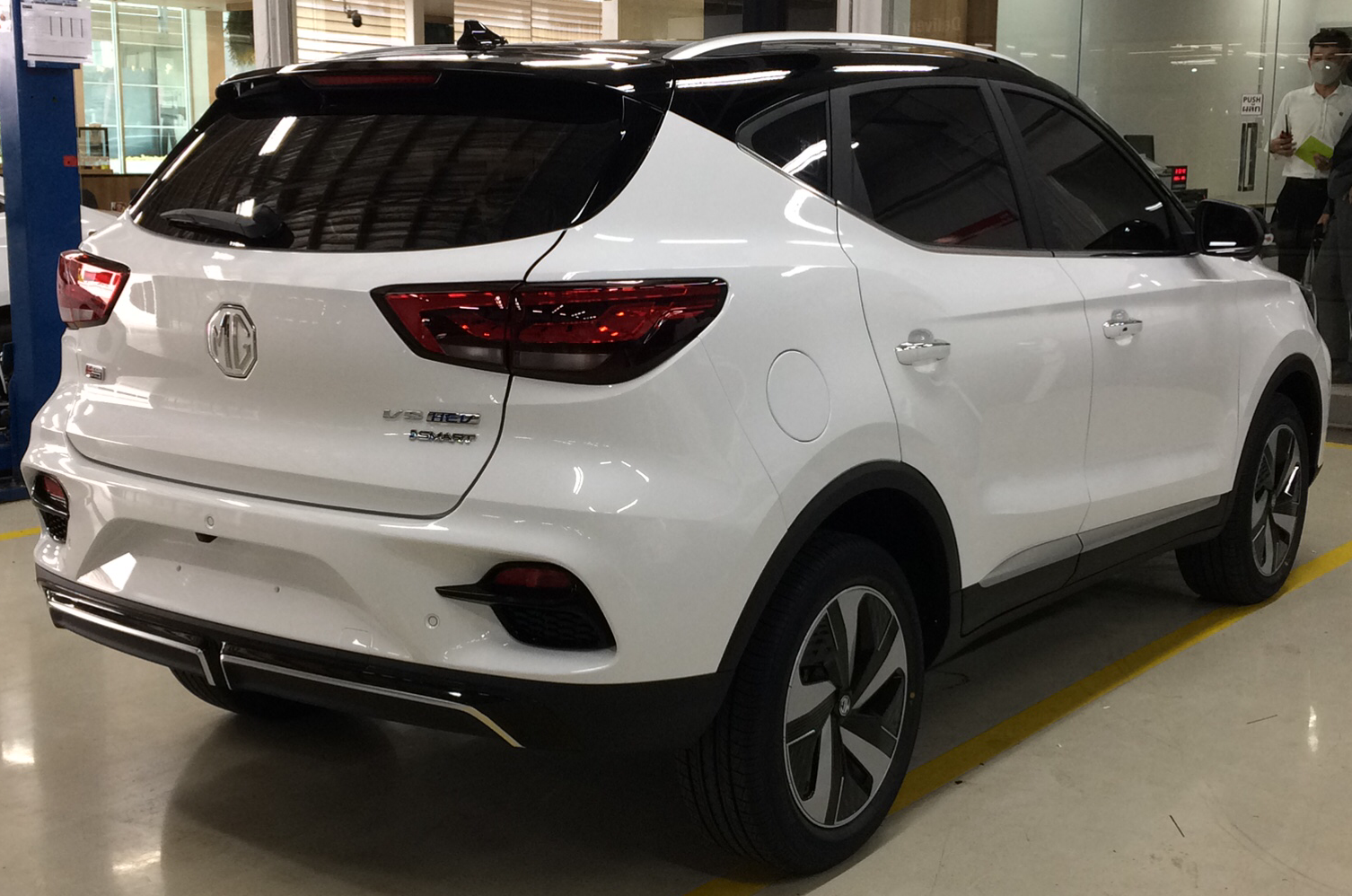
Rear view

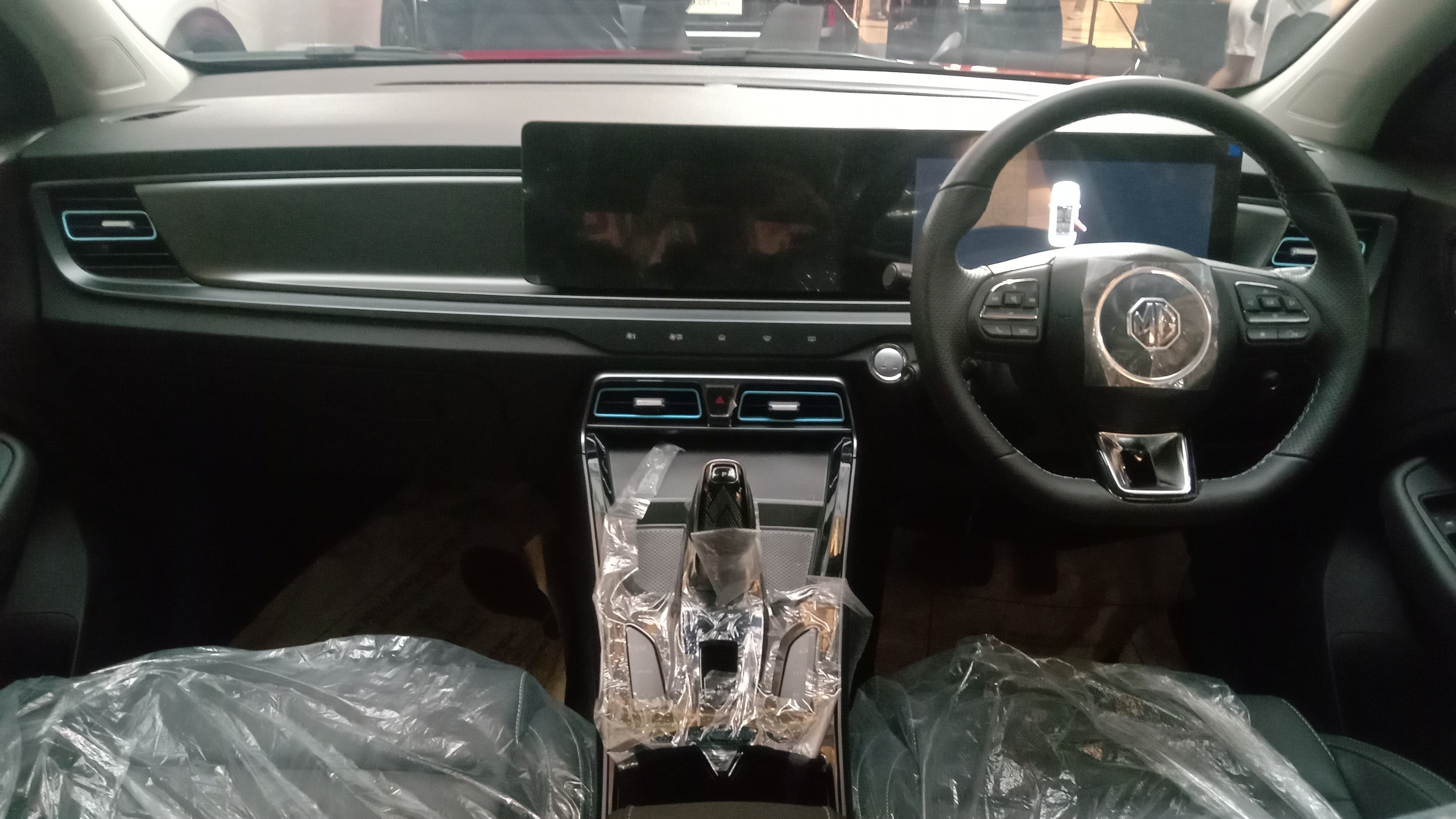
Interior

=== MG EZS / ZS EV ===
MG ZS EV
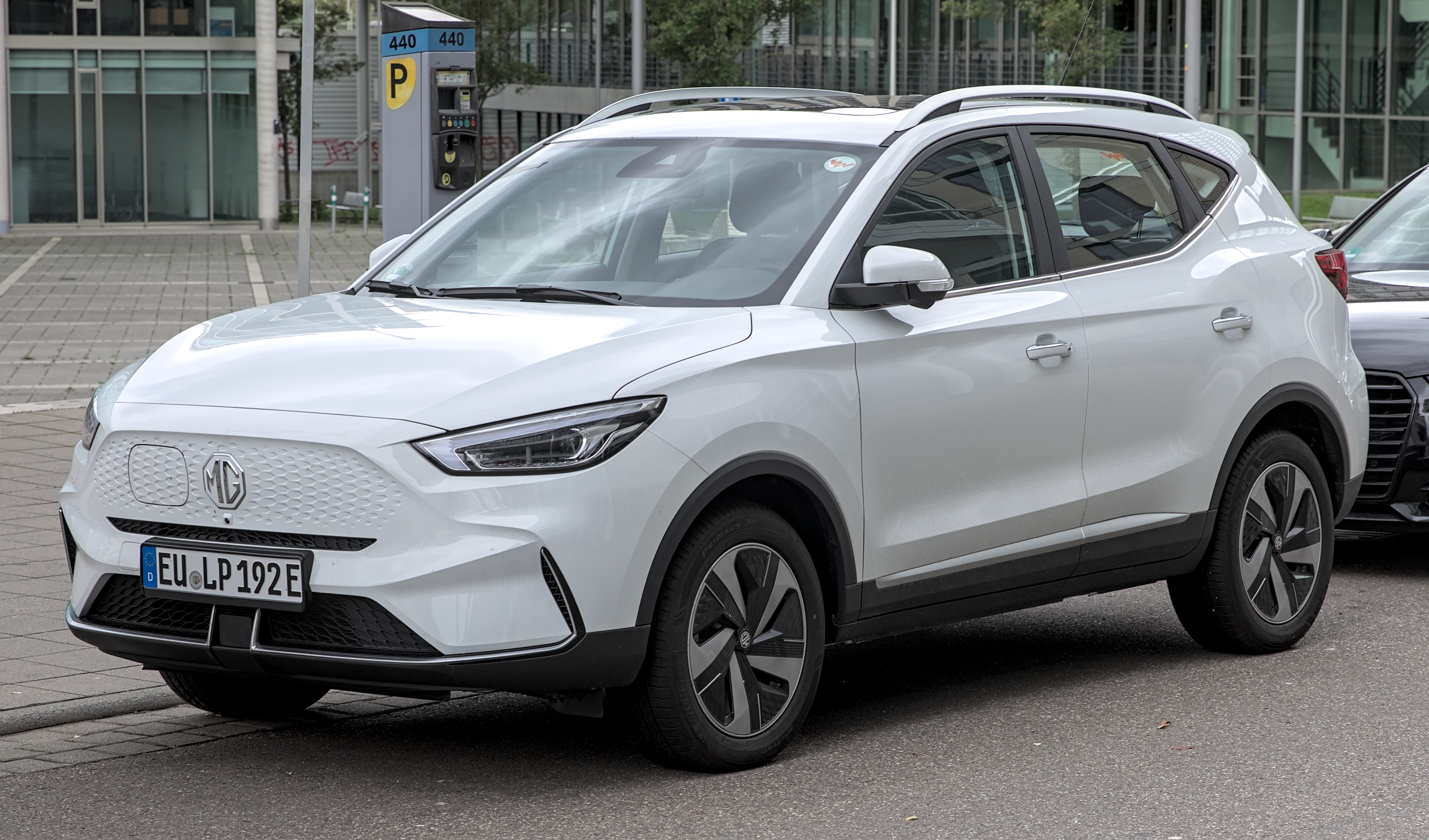
- MG ZS EV (facelift, Germany)

Overview
- Model code: ZS11
- Also called: MG EZS (China)
- Production: 2019 (China); 2019–present (export)
- Model years: 2020–present
- Assembly: China: Zhengzhou (SAIC Motor Zhengzhou Plant); Lingang, Shanghai; Thailand: Laem Chabang (SAIC-CP); India: Halol (JSW MG Motor India); Indonesia: Cikarang, West Java (SGMW Indonesia)

Body and chassis
- Layout: Front-motor, front-wheel-drive

Powertrain
- Electric motor: Permanent magnet synchronous
- Power output: List: 105 kW (143 PS; 141 hp) (pre-facelift); 110 kW (150 PS; 148 hp) (facelift); 130 kW (177 PS; 174 hp) (facelift)
- Transmission: 1-speed fixed gear
- Battery: 44.5 kWh NMC; 50.3 kWh (India); 51.1 kWh LFP; 72.6 kWh NMC
- Electric range: 263–440 km (163–273 mi) (WLTP); 320–505 km (199–314 mi) (NEDC); 340–419 km (211–260 mi) (ARAI)

Dimensions
- Wheelbase: 2,585 mm (101.8 in)
- Length: 4,314–4,323 mm (169.8–170.2 in)
- Width: 1,809 mm (71.2 in)
- Height: 1,620–1,649 mm (63.8–64.9 in)
- Kerb weight: 1,491–1,620 kg (3,287–3,571 lb)

Chronology
- Successor: MGS5 EV

An all electric version made its debut as EZS at the 2018 Guangzhou Auto Show, featuring a 44.5 kWh battery, and a front positioned motor producing 143 PS (141 hp; 105 kW) or 150 PS (148 hp; 110 kW) and 350 N⋅m (35.7 kg⋅m; 258 lb⋅ft) to the front wheels. It is available in the United Kingdom, parts of Europe, Thailand, China, India, New Zealand, Australia and Pakistan. Except for China, the electric SUV is marketed as MG ZS EV, while the official name in China is the MG EZS. Despite launching in China in 2019, the MG EZS was discontinued later that year, while exports were unaffected.

It was revealed in Australia in November 2020 as the cheapest electric car in the market of all time. MG Australia predicted a sales target of 3,000 unit for the 2021 model year.

In late 2021, a facelift version arrived in Europe; and arrived in the UK in November 2021. Besides styling changes, it is also equipped with a larger 72.6-kWh battery. In some markets, MG introduced a smaller, 51 kWh LFP battery version. The ZS EV was also launched in India on 7 March 2022.

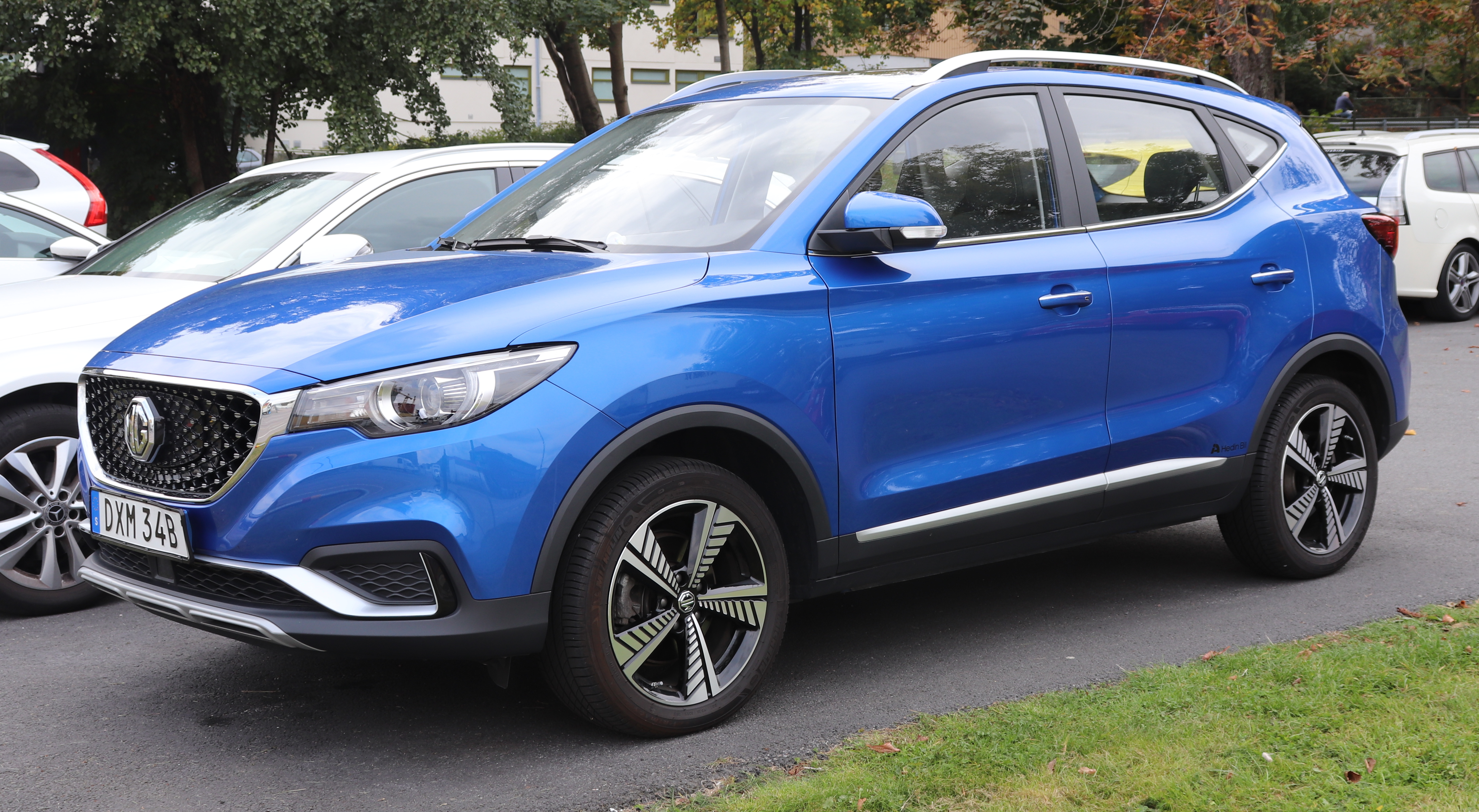
MG ZS EV (pre-facelift, Sweden)

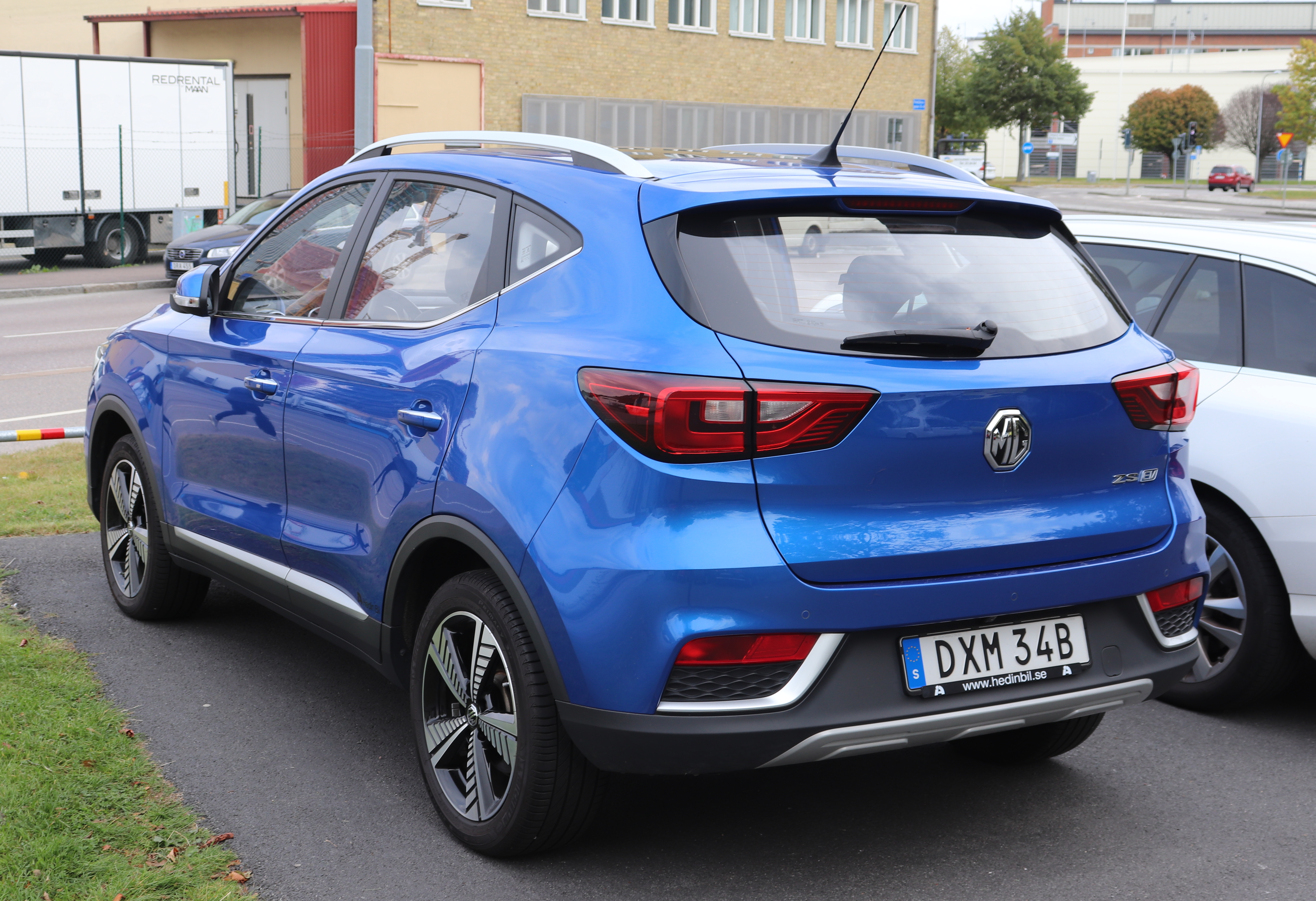
MG ZS EV (pre-facelift, Sweden)

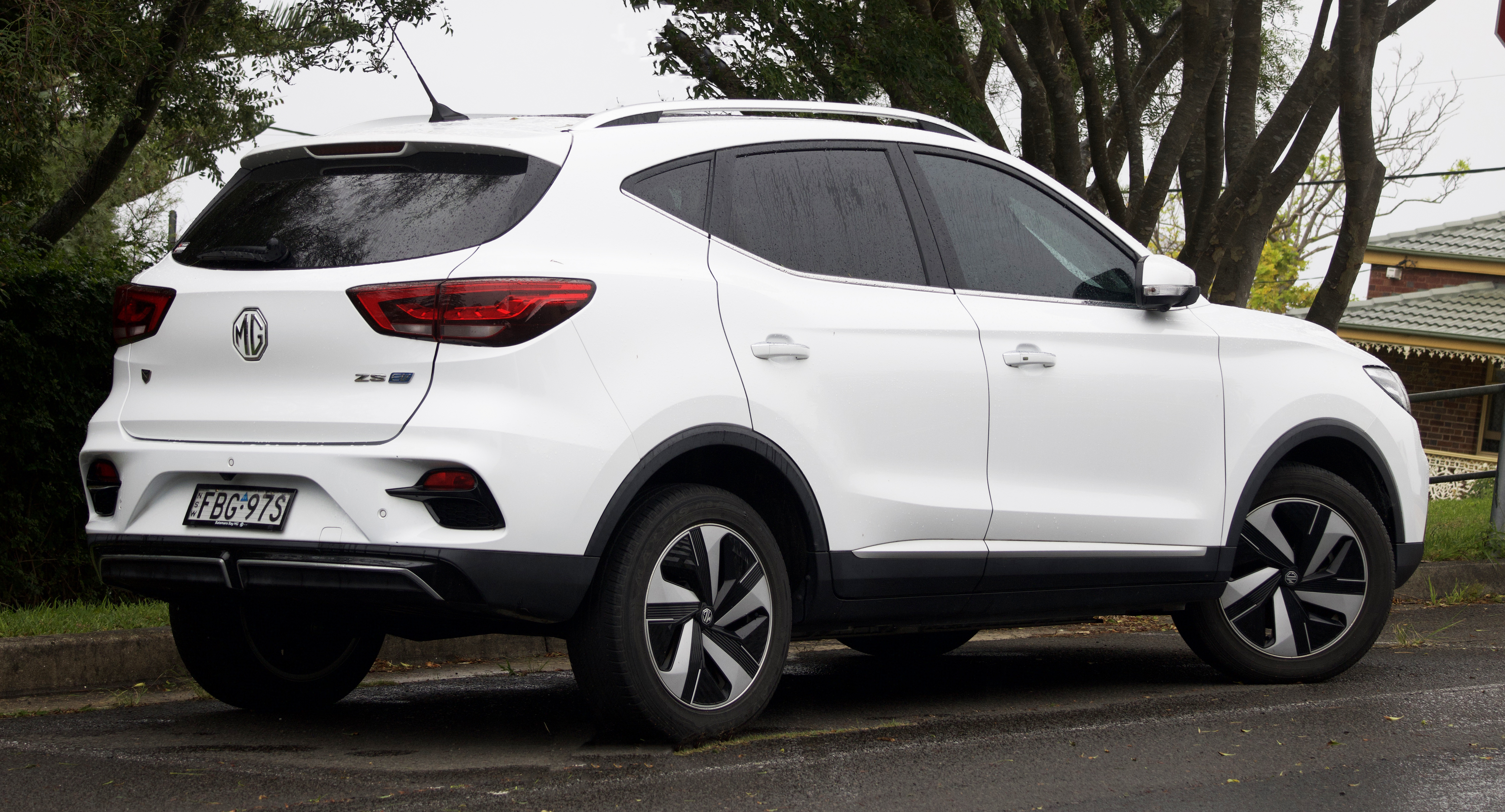
MG ZS EV (facelift, Australia)

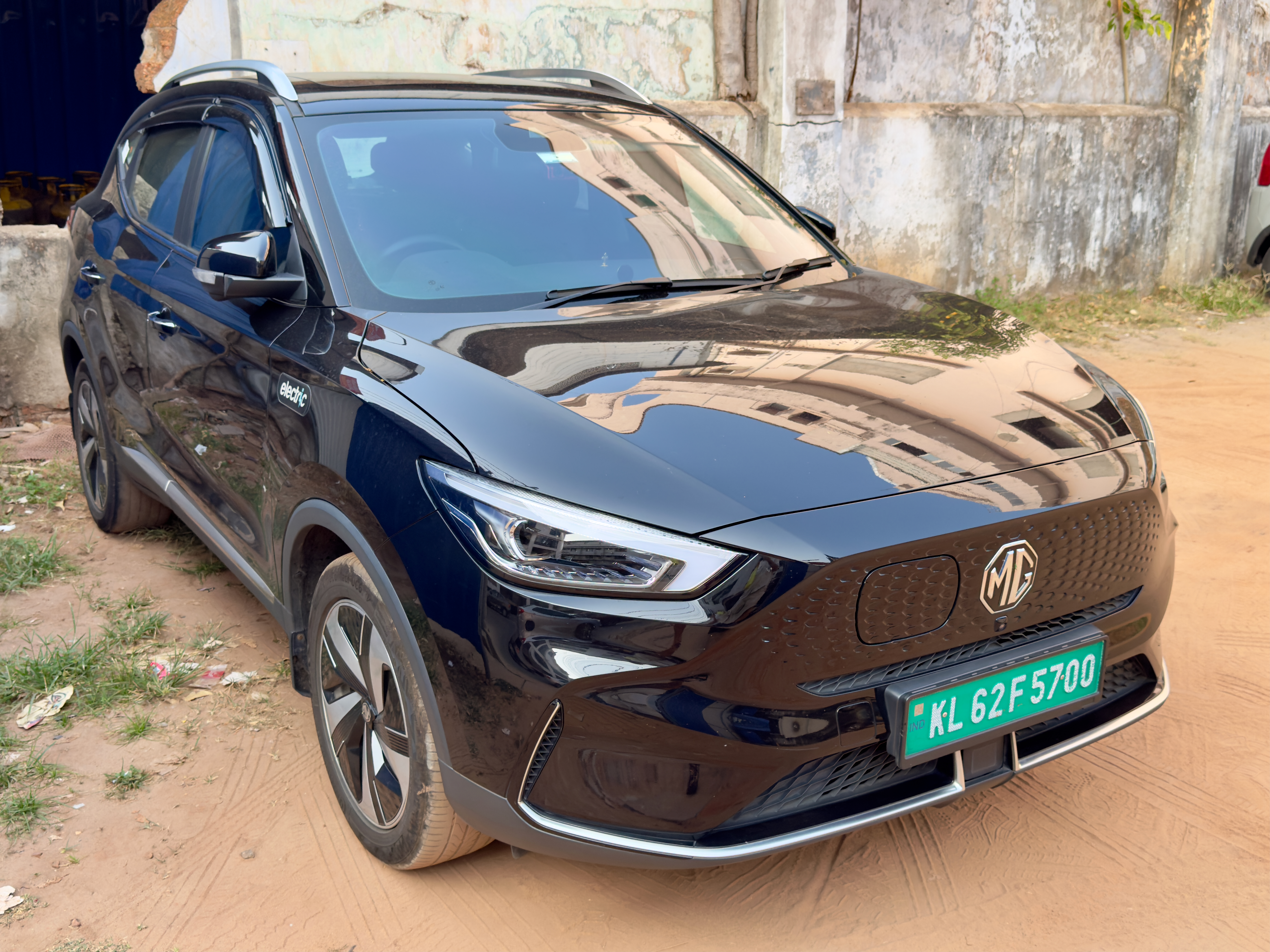
MG ZS EV (facelift, India)

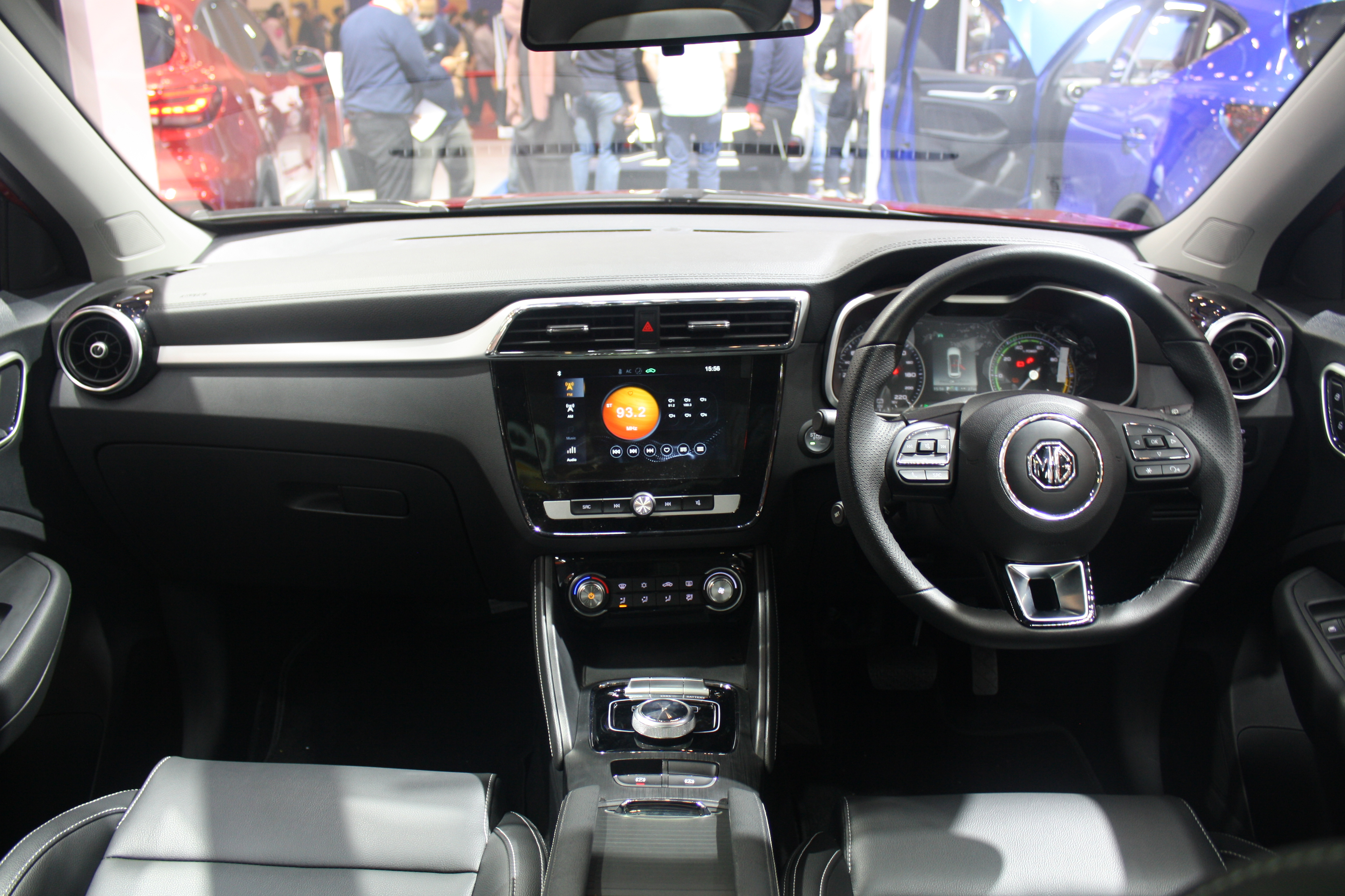
Interior (pre-facelift)

==== Markets ====
===== Asia =====
====== India ======
The ZS EV debuted in India on 23 January 2020, with two trim levels: Excite and Exclusive. The facelifted ZS EV made its Indian debut in March 2022.

====== Indonesia ======
The ZS EV went on sale in Indonesia on 10 January 2024 as the facelifted model, which was first introduced in August 2023 at the 30th Gaikindo Indonesia International Auto Show. The pre-facelift model was originally showcased in April 2021 at the 28th Indonesia International Motor Show. It is offered with one variant: Magnify. It is locally assembled at the SAIC-GM-Wuling Indonesia plant in Cikarang, Bekasi Regency, with production started in February 2024. Alongside the MG4 EV, it is one of the first MG vehicles to be built in Indonesia.

===== Malaysia =====
The ZS EV was launched in Malaysia on 27 March 2024 in a sole variant, alongside the MG4 EV.

===== Philippines =====
The ZS EV was launched in the Philippines on 5 April 2024 in a sole variant, alongside the MG4 EV XPower.

===== Singapore =====
The ZS EV was launched in Singapore on 13 January 2020 at the 2020 Singapore Motor Show, in a sole variant. The facelifted ZS EV debuted in Singapore on 16 January 2023 at the 2023 Singapore Motor Show, alongside the Singapore introduction of the MG 4.

===== Thailand =====
The ZS EV debuted in Thailand in June 2019, two years after the petrol-powered ZS. The facelifted ZS EV in March 2022 at the 43rd Bangkok International Motor Show. It is powered by a 51.1 battery pack, with two trim levels: D and X.

===== Europe =====
The ZS EV went on sale in the UK in September 2019, with two trim levels: Excite and Exclusive. The facelifted ZS EV range debuted in late 2021 with three trim levels: SE, Trophy, and Connect; all variants are powered by the 'Long Range' powertrain with 72.6 kWh.

MG Motors made its European debut starting in Norway in October 2019, with the ZS EV.

===== Mexico =====
The ZS EV was launched in Mexico on 18 October 2023, three years after the petrol-powered ZS. It is the first battery electric vehicle by the MG marque marketed in Mexico.

===== Middle East =====
The ZS EV was launched in November 2019 and it is powered by the 44.5 kWh battery pack. The facelifted ZS EV was launched in August 2023 and it is powered by the 51.1 kWh LFP battery pack.

===== Oceania =====
====== Australia ======
The ZS EV debuted in Australia on 10 November 2020, three years after the petrol-powered ZS, as the cheapest electric vehicle in the Australia at the time. It is powered by a 44.5 battery pack with the facelift having 51.1 and 72.6 battery packs, it is available in three trim levels: Excite, Essence, and Long Range. The facelifted ZS EV debuted in September 2022.

====== New Zealand ======
The ZS EV was launched in New Zealand on 10 November 2020 in a sole variant, a year after the petrol-powered ZS. At the time of launch, it was first sub-$50k electric vehicle on sale in New Zealand. In September 2022, the facelift ZS EV debut with two trim levels: Excite and Essence; powered by a 50.3 kWh battery pack.

=== Safety ===
Euro NCAP test results* MG ZS (2017)
| Test | Points | % |
|---|---|---|
| Overall: | 3 /5 stars | |
| Adult occupant: | 27.3 | 71% |
| Child occupant: | 25.1 | 51% |
| Pedestrian: | 25.1 | 59% |
| Safety assist: | 3.5 | 29% |

Euro NCAP test results* MG ZS EV (2019)
| Test | Points | % |
|---|---|---|
| Overall: | 5 /5 stars | |
| Adult occupant: | 34.5 | 90% |
| Child occupant: | 41.7 | 85% |
| Pedestrian: | 31 | 64% |
| Safety assist: | 9.2 | 70% |

ASEAN NCAP test results MG ZS (2020)
| Test | Points |
|---|---|
| Overall: | 5 /5 stars |
| Adult occupant: | 44.82 |
| Child occupant: | 20.90 |
| Safety assist: | 15.28 |

ANCAP test results* MG ZS all variants (2017)
| Test | Score |
|---|---|
| Overall | 5 /5 stars |
| Frontal offset | 14.46/16 |
| Side impact | 16/16 |
| Pole | 2/2 |
| Seat belt reminders | 3/3 |
| Whiplash protection | Good |
| Pedestrian protection | Adequate |
| Electronic stability control | Standard |

ANCAP test results MG ZS EV all EV variants (2020, aligned with Euro NCAP)
| Test | Points | % |
|---|---|---|
| Overall: | 5 /5 stars | |
| Adult occupant: | 34.4 | 90% |
| Child occupant: | 41.5 | 84% |
| Pedestrian: | 30.9 | 64% |
| Safety assist: | 9.2 | 71% |

TNCAP (2.0) test result MG ZS 1.5 'Heartbeat' (2026, similar to Euro NCAP 2022)
| Test | Points | % |
|---|---|---|
| Overall: | 0/5 stars | |
| Adult occupant: | 21.322 | 56% |
| Child occupant: | 43.652 | 89% |
| Pedestrian: | 21.871 | 45% |
| Safety assist: | 3.835 | 25% |

== Second generation (2024) ==
Second generation
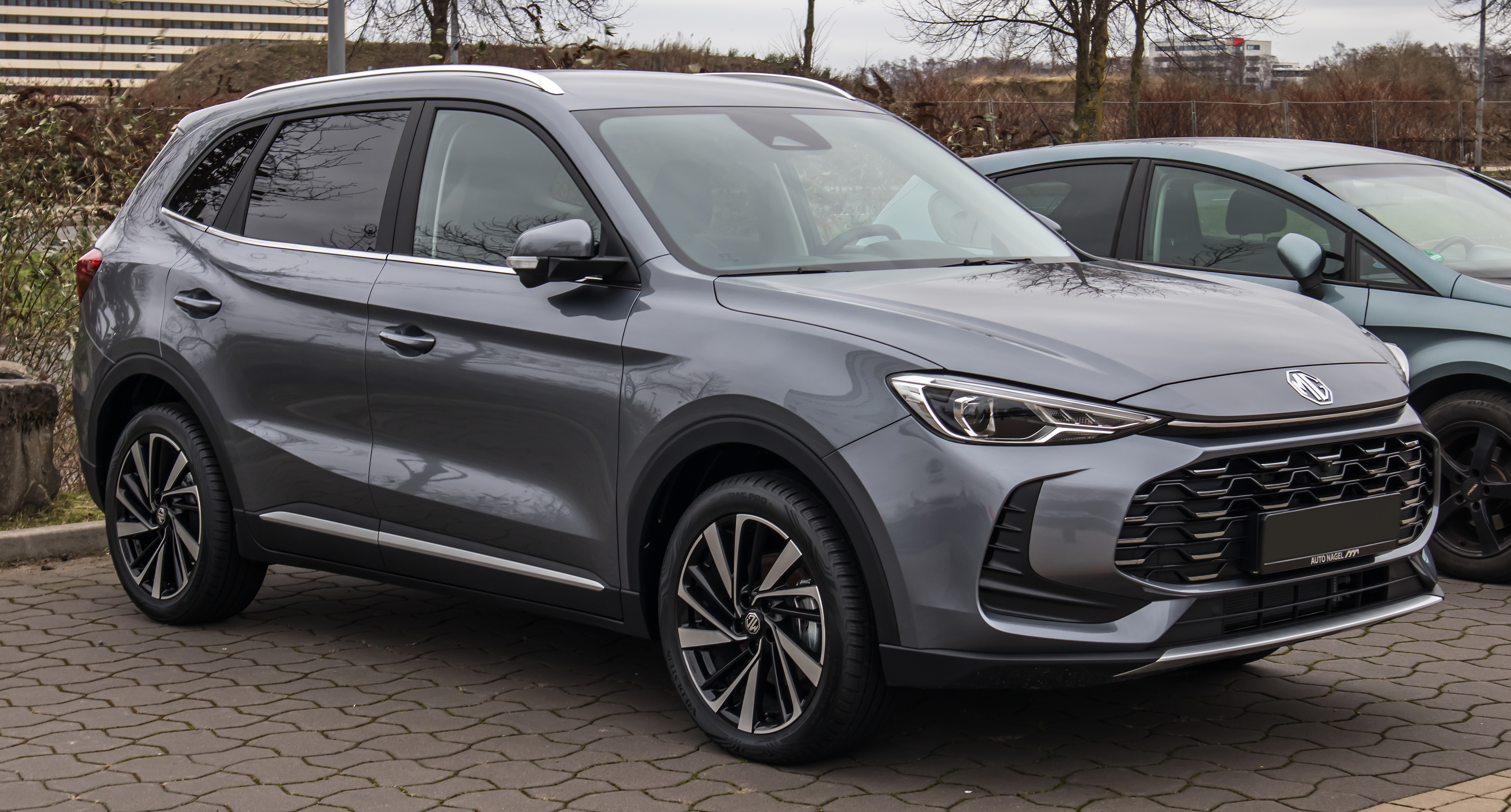
- 2025 MG ZS Hybrid

Overview
- Model code: ZS32
- Also called: ZS Pro (South Africa)
- Production: 2024–present
- Assembly: China: Zhengzhou, Henan; Lingang, Shanghai; Indonesia: Cikarang, West Java (SGMW Indonesia); Malaysia: Malacca (EPMB)

Body and chassis
- Related: MG3 (third generation)

Powertrain
- Engine: Petrol: 1.5 L GM/SAIC L3A I4; Petrol hybrid: 1.5 L L3A I4
- Electric motor: 100 kW permanent magnet synchronous (hybrid)
- Power output: 110–170 PS (108–168 hp; 81–125 kW); 197–215 PS (194–212 hp; 145–158 kW) (Hybrid+)
- Transmission: 5-speed manual; 3-speed automatic (Hybrid+); CVT
- Hybrid drivetrain: Power-split (Hybrid+)
- Battery: 1.83 kWh lithium-ion (Hybrid+)

Dimensions
- Wheelbase: 2,610 mm (102.8 in)
- Length: 4,430 mm (174.4 in)
- Width: 1,818 mm (71.6 in)
- Height: 1,635 mm (64.4 in)
- Kerb weight: 1,380–1,420 kg (3,042–3,131 lb) (hybrid)

The second-generation ZS was unveiled on 28 August 2024.

For many markets such as in Europe, the second-generation ZS is only available with a hybrid powertrain marketed as ZS Hybrid+, powered by a 100 kW (136 PS; 134 hp) electric motor and a 1.8 kWh battery, combined with a 1.5-litre four-cylinder petrol engine producing 106 PS (105 hp; 78 kW) for a total system output of 196 PS (193 hp; 144 kW).

The EV variant will no longer be offered, replaced by the similarly-sized MGS5 EV that is built on a dedicated battery electric vehicle platform, Modular Scalable Platform shared with the MG4 EV.

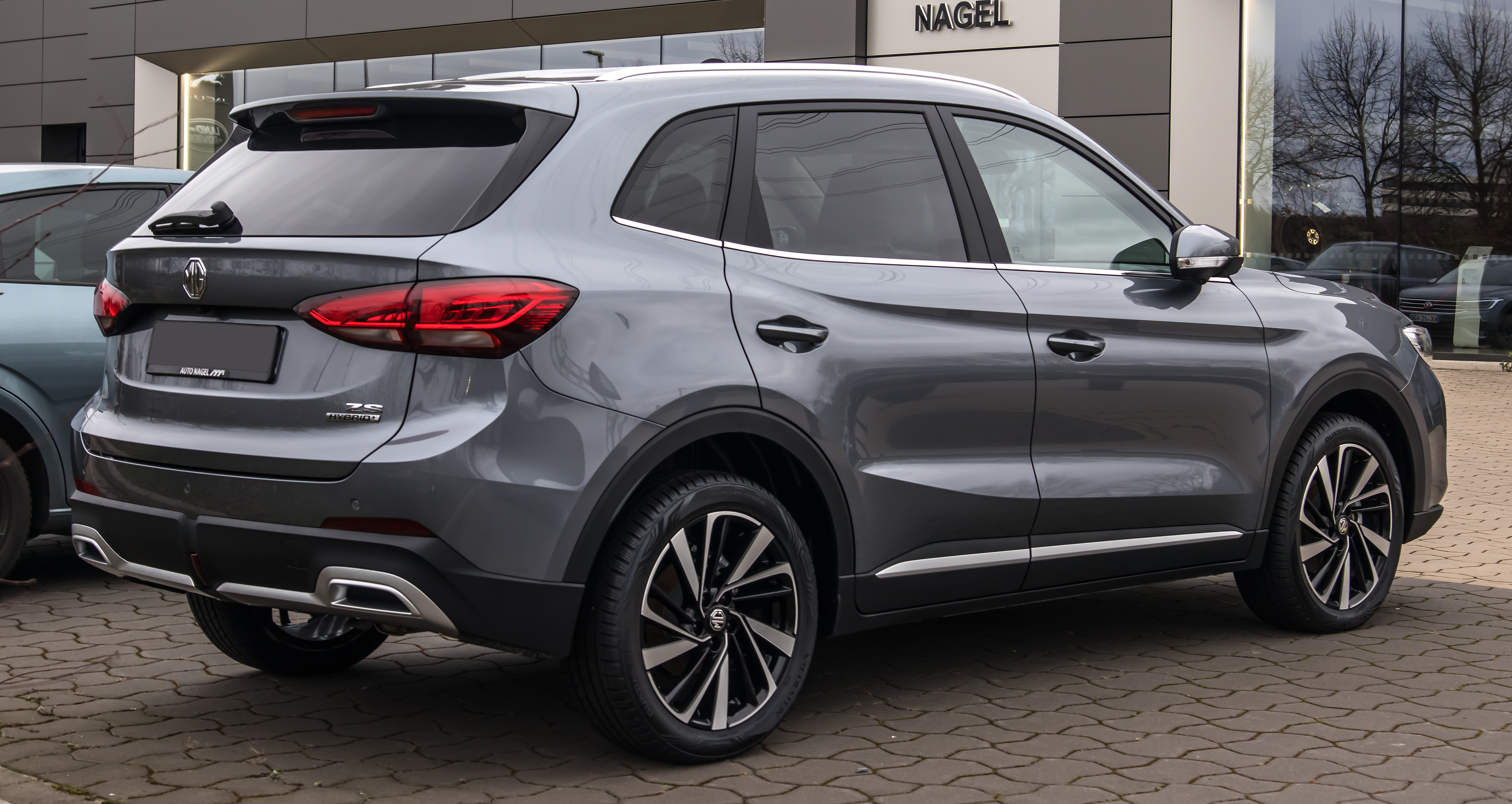
Rear view

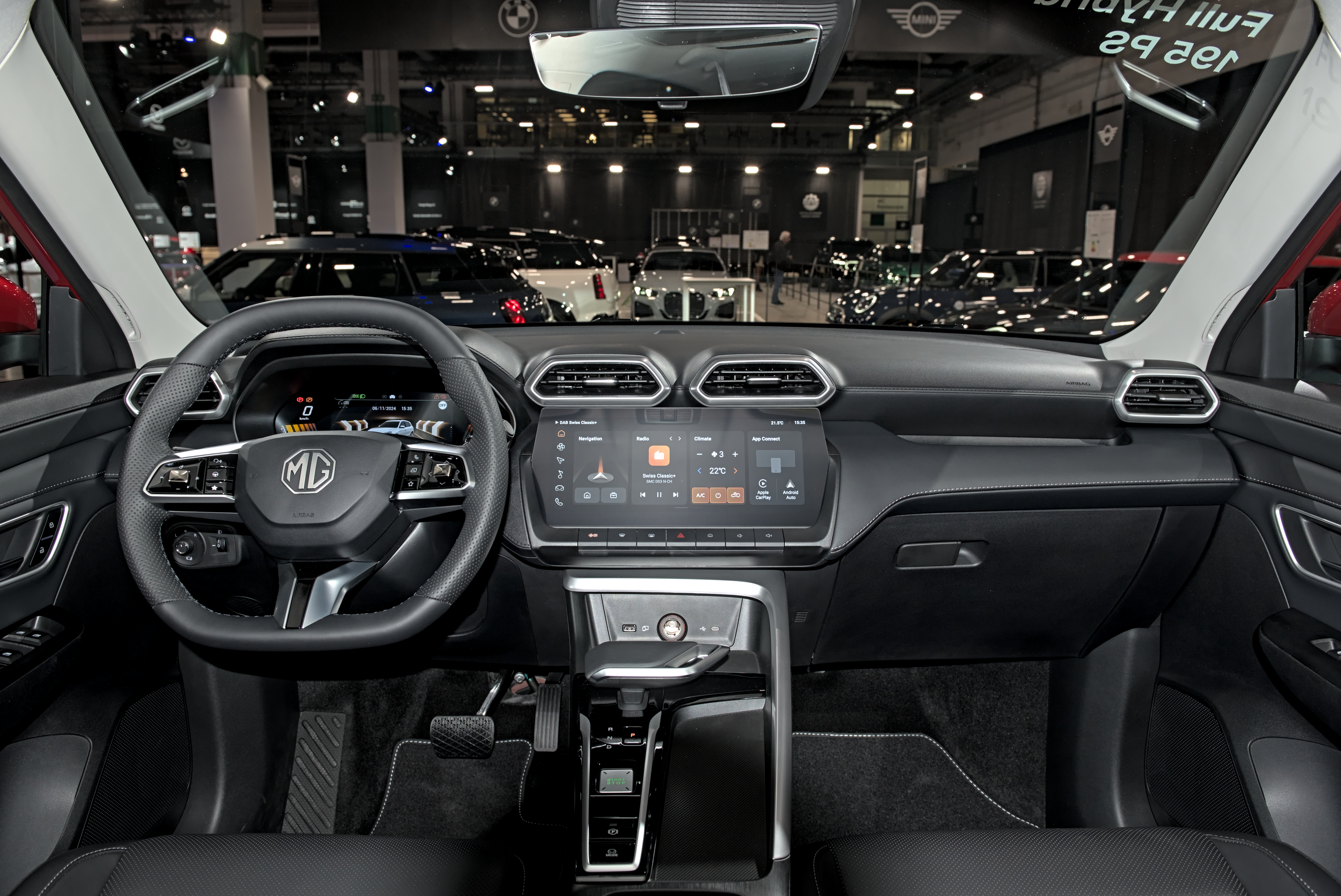
Interior

=== Markets ===
==== Asia ====
===== Brunei =====
The second-generation ZS was launched in Brunei on 13 February 2026 with two trim levels: Vibe and Essence, all variants are powered by a 1.5-litre naturally aspirated petrol engine.

===== Indonesia =====
The second-generation ZS was launched in Indonesia on 29 July 2026 at the 33rd Gaikindo Indonesia International Auto Show, with two trim levels: Ignite and Magnify, it is powered by the Hybrid+ powertrain.

===== Malaysia =====
The second-generation ZS was launched in Malaysia on 29 October 2026 with two trim levels; 1.5-litre turbocharged petrol and Hybrid+ powertrains.

===== Philippines =====
The second-generation ZS was launched in the Philippines on 3 July 2025, with four variants: Comfort, Luxury, Turbo Sport and Hybrid+. For powertrains, it is available with either 1.5-litre petrol, 1.5-litre turbocharged petrol and Hybrid+ powertrains.

==== Europe ====
The second-generation ZS was available in the UK with two trim levels: SE and Trophy, it is available with the Hybrid+ powertrain.

==== Latin America ====
===== Argentina =====
The second-generation ZS was launched in Argentina on 20 September 2025, as part of MG's entry to the Argentinian market by distributor Eximar. It is available with two trim levels: Comfort and Luxury, it is powered by the Hybrid+ powertrain.

===== Mexico =====
The second-generation ZS was launched in Mexico on 21 April 2025, with two trim levels: Excite and Elegance, it is available with either a 1.5-litre turbocharged petrol or the Hybrid+ powertrain.

==== Middle East ====
The second-generation ZS was unveiled for the Middle Eastern markets on 25 February 2025. It is powered by the 1.5-litre engine and 1.5-litre turbocharged engine, and it is available in three trim levels; the 1.5-litre trims are STD and COM, while the 1.5-litre turbo trims are COM and LUX.

==== Oceania ====
===== Australia =====
The second-generation ZS was launched in Australia on 15 November 2024, with two trim levels: Excite and Essence, it was initially powered by the Hybrid+ powertrain. In January 2025, the Excite (later renamed to Vibe), Essence and Essence Turbo non-hybrid variants were added, it is powered by either a 1.5-litre petrol or 1.5-litre turbocharged petrol engines. In October 2025, the entry-level Excite trim was renamed to the Vibe trim and also became available with the 1.5-litre turbocharged petrol engine.

===== New Zealand =====
The second-generation ZS was launched in New Zealand on 18 November 2024, with two trim levels: Excite and Essence, it is available with the Hybrid+ powertrain.

==== South Africa ====
The second-generation ZS was launched in South Africa on 29 August 2025 as the ZS Pro. It is available with two trim levels: Comfort and Luxury, it is powered by the 1.5-litre turbocharged petrol engine. In South Africa, the second-generation model marketed with the Pro suffix is sold alongside the first-generation ZS which remains on sale as an entry-level crossover SUV option in the market.

=== Safety ===
Euro NCAP test results MG ZS Hybrid 1.5L (LHD) (2024)
| Test | Points | % |
|---|---|---|
| Overall: | 4 /5 stars | |
| Adult occupant: | 30.3 | 75% |
| Child occupant: | 40.2 | 82% |
| Pedestrian: | 46.6 | 73% |
| Safety assist: | 13.8 | 76% |

ANCAP test results MG ZS hybrid variants (2024, aligned with Euro NCAP)
| Test | Points | % |
|---|---|---|
| Overall: | 5 /5 stars | |
| Adult occupant: | 30.30 | 75% |
| Child occupant: | 41.19 | 84% |
| Pedestrian: | 46.55 | 73% |
| Safety assist: | 14.25 | 79% |

ANCAP test results MG ZS all variants (2025, aligned with Euro NCAP)
| Test | Points | % |
|---|---|---|
| Overall: | 5 /5 stars | |
| Adult occupant: | 32.80 | 81% |
| Child occupant: | 41.19 | 84% |
| Pedestrian: | 46.55 | 73% |
| Safety assist: | 14.25 | 79% |

== Sales ==
| Year | Sales | | | | | | | | | | | Total production |
| Year | China | Thailand | | India | Europe | Australia | Mexico | | Indonesia | | | Total production |
| Year | China | ZS | VS | India | Europe | Australia | ZS | ZS EV | ZS | ZS EV | VS | Total production |
|---|---|---|---|---|---|---|---|---|---|---|---|---|
| 2017 | | 768 | — | — | 374 | | | | | | | 70,164 |
| 2018 | | 14,669 | — | — | 5,376 | | | | | | | 112,159 |
| 2019 | | 14,410 | — | — | 9,872 | 3,729 | | | | | | 121,972 |
| 2020 | 28,091 | 11,780 | — | 1,142 | 19,676 | 5,494 | | | 204 | | | 116,874 |
| 2021 | 15,253 | 11,987 | — | 2,798 | 18,690 | 18,423 | 6,758 | | 475 | | | 152,432 |
| 2022 | 4,104 | 6,856 | 1,086 | 4,494 | 45,972 | 22,466 | 11,050 | | 323 | | | 174,665 |
| 2023 | 158 | 4,287 | 1,711 | 3,280 | | 29,258 | 8,561 | 55 | 392 | 2 | | 251,346 |
| 2024 | — | 1,938 | 804 | | | 22,629 | 7,176 | 262 | 136 | 767 | 312 | 181,140 |
| 2025 | | | | | | 20,000 | 2,190 | 123 | 265 | 391 | 204 | |

== See also ==
- Plug-in electric vehicles in India
