= Roewe RX3 =

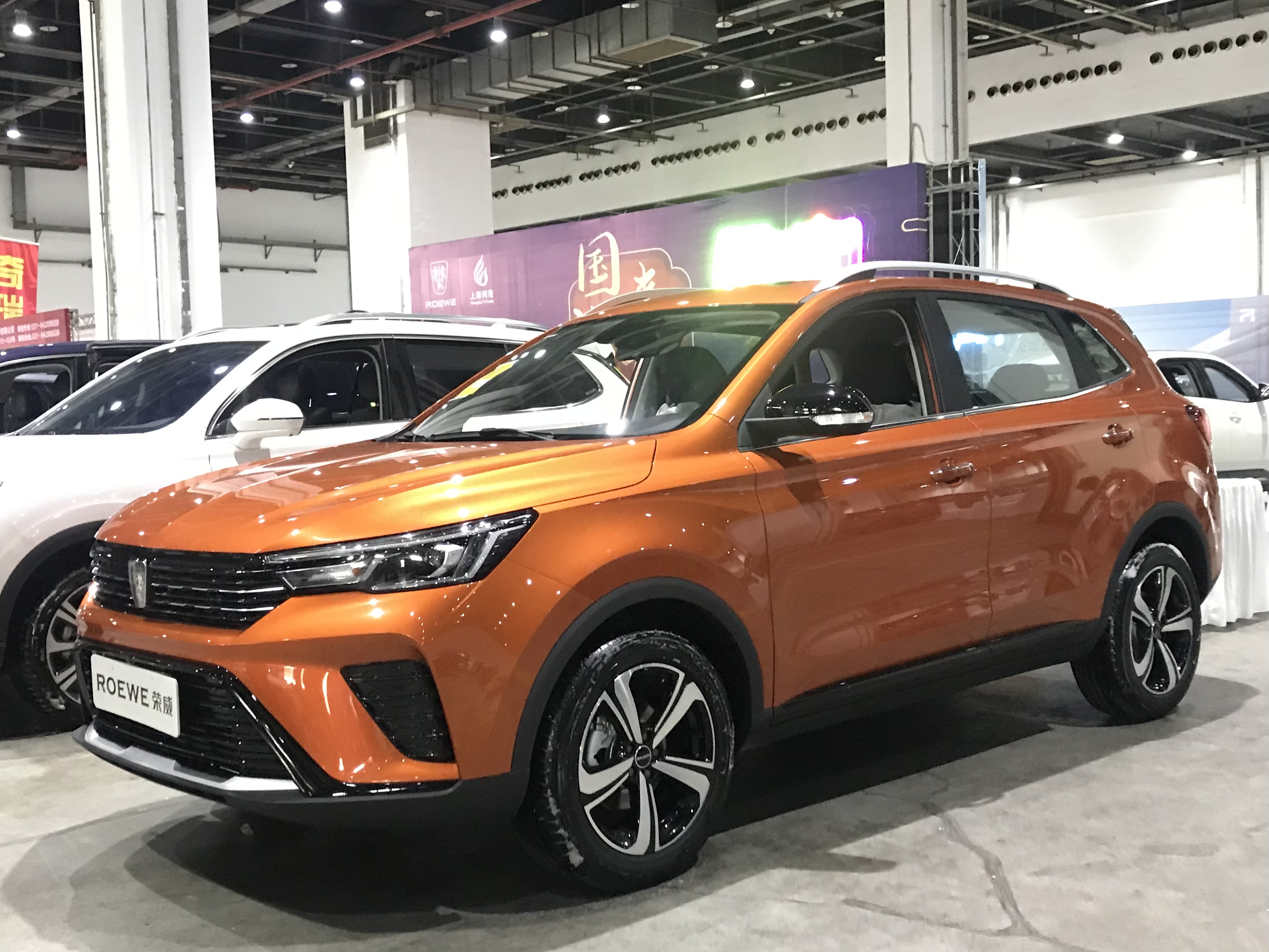

Overview
- Manufacturer: SAIC Motor
- Model code: ZS12
- Also called: Roewe RX3 Pro (2021 facelift); Roewe Totoro/Lomemo (hybrid variant from 2022)
- Production: 2017–2023
- Assembly: China: Zhengzhou

Body and chassis
- Class: Subcompact crossover SUV
- Body style: 5-door SUV
- Layout: Front-engine, front-wheel-drive
- Related: MG ZS

Powertrain
- Engine: Petrol: 1.3 L LI6 turbo I4; 1.6 L 16S4C I4; Petrol hybrid: 1.5 L 15S4C I4
- Electric motor: 95 PS; 94 hp (70 kW) Permanent magnet synchronous motor (HEV)
- Power output: 163 PS; 161 hp (120 kW) (1.3 Turbo); 181 PS; 178 hp (133 kW) (1.5 HEV); 125 PS; 123 hp (92 kW) (1.6)
- Transmission: 5-speed manual; 6-speed automatic; CVT
- Hybrid drivetrain: Parallel (Lomemo)

Dimensions
- Wheelbase: 2,625 mm (103.3 in)
- Length: 4,408 mm (173.5 in); 4,437 mm (174.7 in) (RX3 Pro); 4,440 mm (174.8 in) (Lomemo)
- Width: 1,804 mm (71.0 in); 1,810 mm (71.3 in) (Lomemo)
- Height: 1,651 mm (65.0 in); 1,634 mm (64.3 in) (Lomemo)

The Roewe RX3 is a subcompact crossover manufactured by SAIC's sub brand, Roewe. The original RX3 was sold from 2017 and received an update called the RX3 Pro in 2021. A larger hybrid variant in the compact crossover SUV segment called the Lomemo was available from May 2022.

In the following years, the model's market share fell, despite the 2021 restyling.

== Overview ==
The RX3 crossover shares its underpinnings with the MG ZS, and is positioned below the Roewe RX5 compact crossover.

In 2019, the Roewe RX3 received an update for the China VI emission standards. The 2019 Roewe RX3 was officially launched on 17 June with the highlight of the 2019 Roewe RX3 being the child safety seat, it features an integrated child safety seat on the rear seats. According to the SAIC, it takes only four steps to complete the switch between the ordinary rear seat and the child safety seat. Additionally, the panoramic sunroof will be the standard configuration for the updated 2019 models.

The Roewe RX3 is powered by a 1.6- litre naturally aspirated petrol engine and a 1.3-litre turbocharged petrol engine. The maximum power is 92 kW (123 hp; 125 PS) and 158 N⋅m (117 lb⋅ft; 16 kg⋅m) for the former and 120 kW (161 hp; 163 PS) and 230 N⋅m (170 lb⋅ft; 23 kg⋅m) for the latter. The transmissions options are six-speed automatic gearbox for the 1.3-litre turbocharged engines, and manual and CVT gearboxes supplied by Aisin for the 1.6-litre engines. According to SAIC, the fuel consumption for the 1.6-litre engine models is 5.6 litres per 100 kilometres (18 km/L; 42 mpg_{‑US}; 50 mpg_{‑imp}).

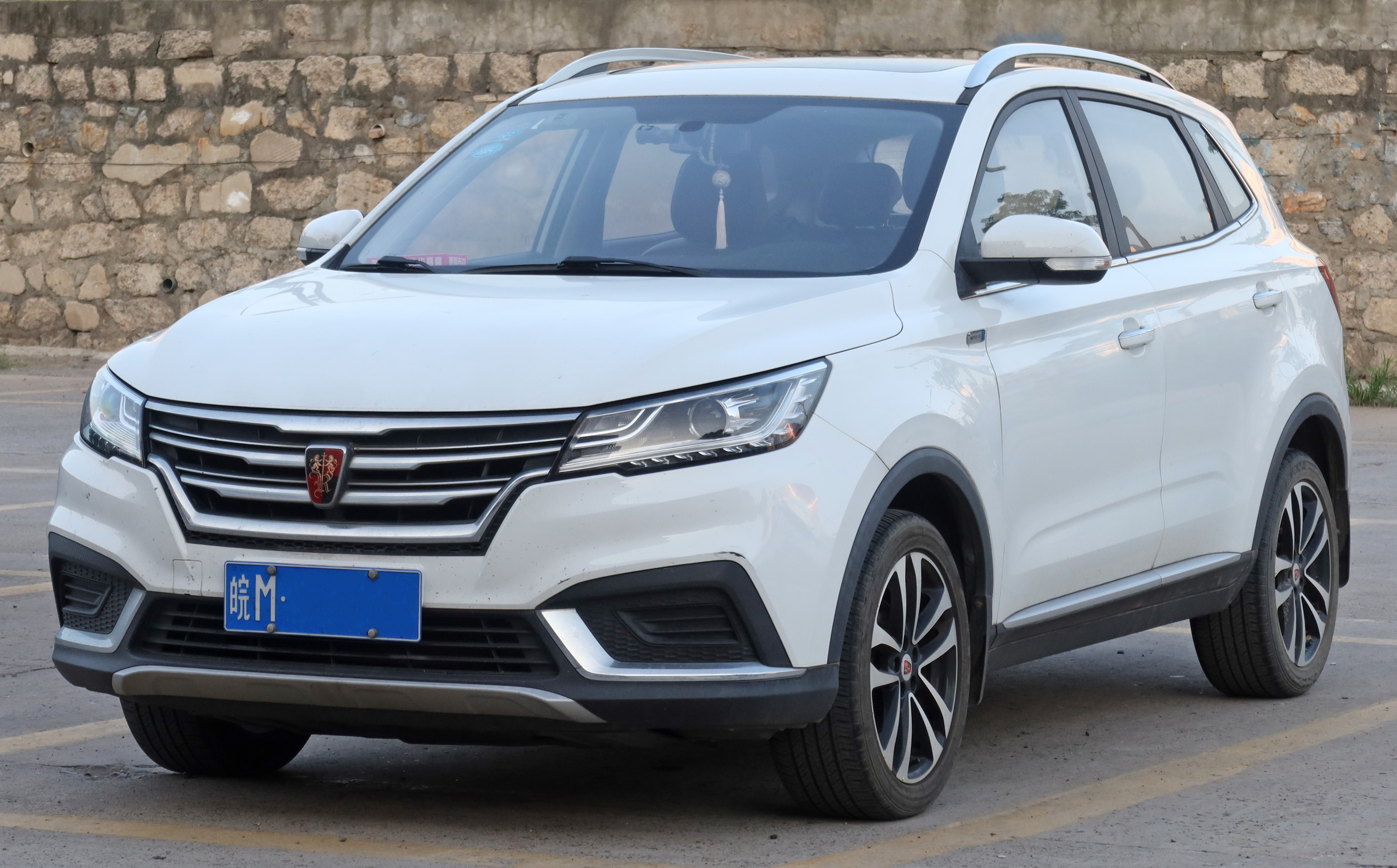
Roewe RX3 (front)

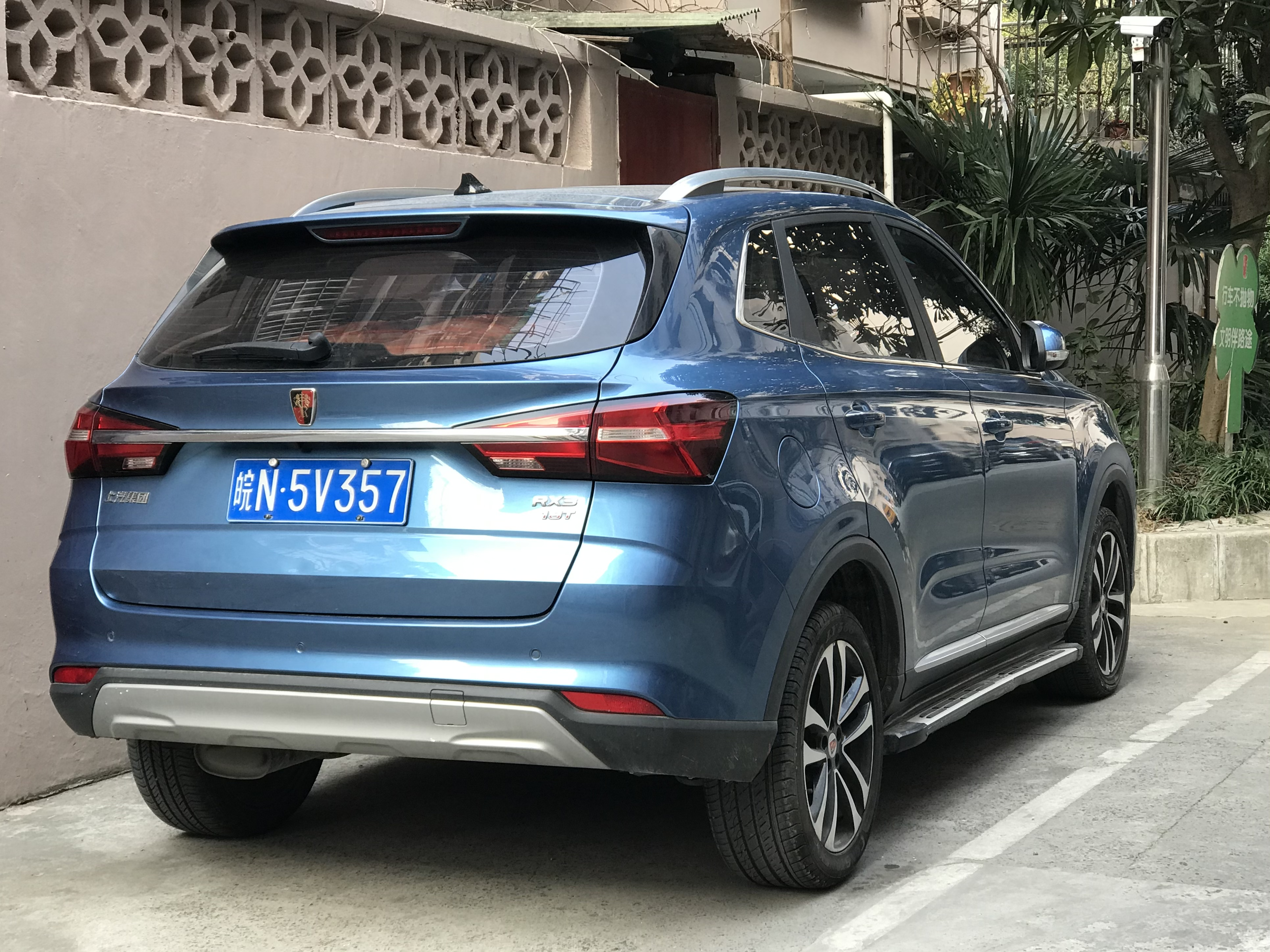
Roewe RX3 (rear)

=== Roewe RX3 Pro ===
The Roewe RX3 Pro was announced on March 19, 2021, as the 2021 facelift for the RX3 model range. The RX3 Pro features a redesigned front end and restyled tail lamps with options adding an additional "chasing orange" color. The redesigned front features standardize LED headlights across the range and the update also includes a panoramic sunroof and 10.1-inch suspended high-definition large screens for the interior. The power of the RX3 Pro is a 1.6-litre engine with the maximum power of 92 kW (123 hp; 125 PS) and maximum torque of 158 N⋅m (117 lb⋅ft; 16 kg⋅m). The engine is mated to a five-speed manual transmission or CVT. The fuel consumption is 6.1–6.0 litres per 100 kilometres (16–17 km/L; 39–39 mpg_{‑US}; 46–47 mpg_{‑imp}).

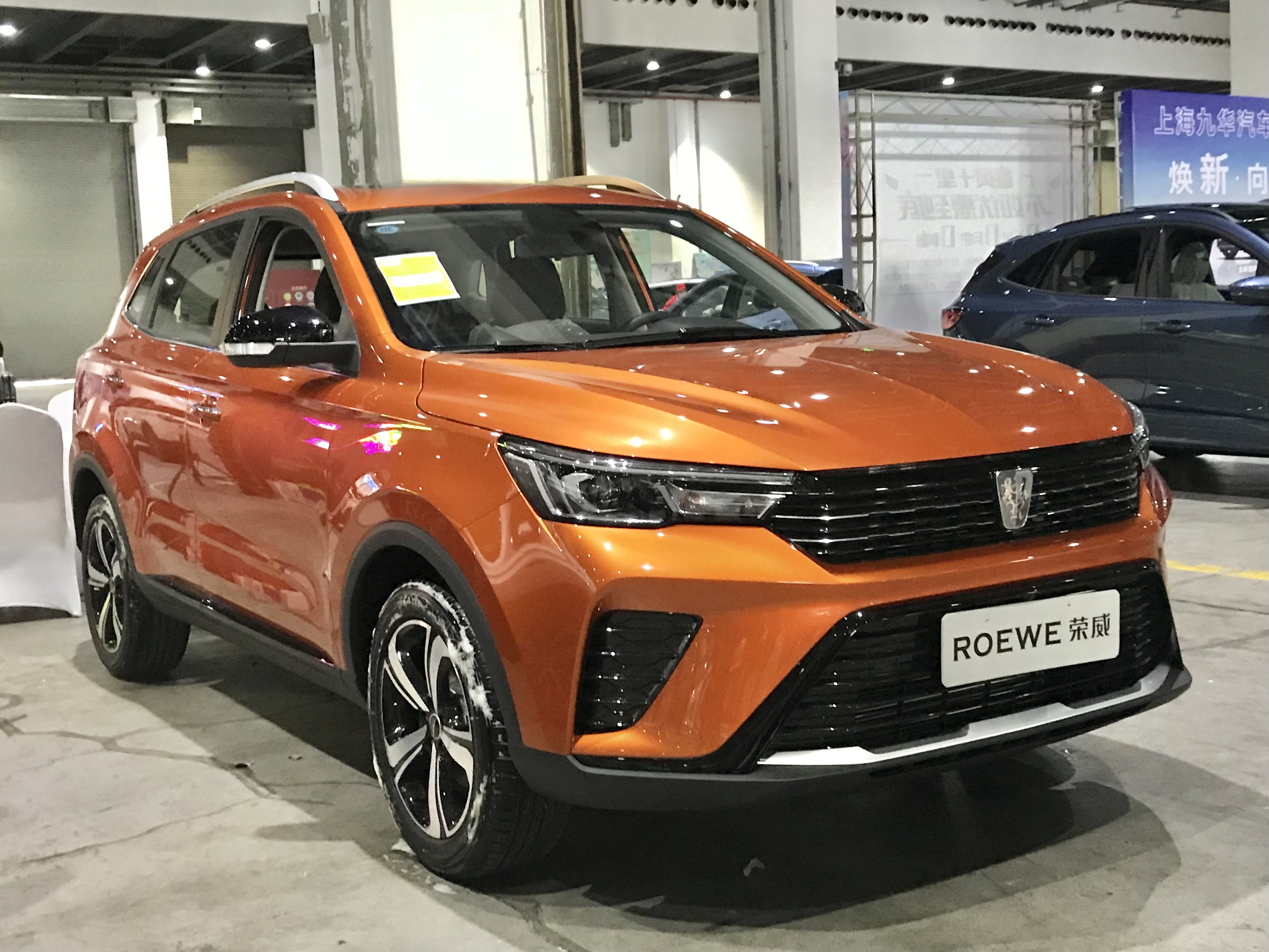
Roewe RX3 Pro (front)

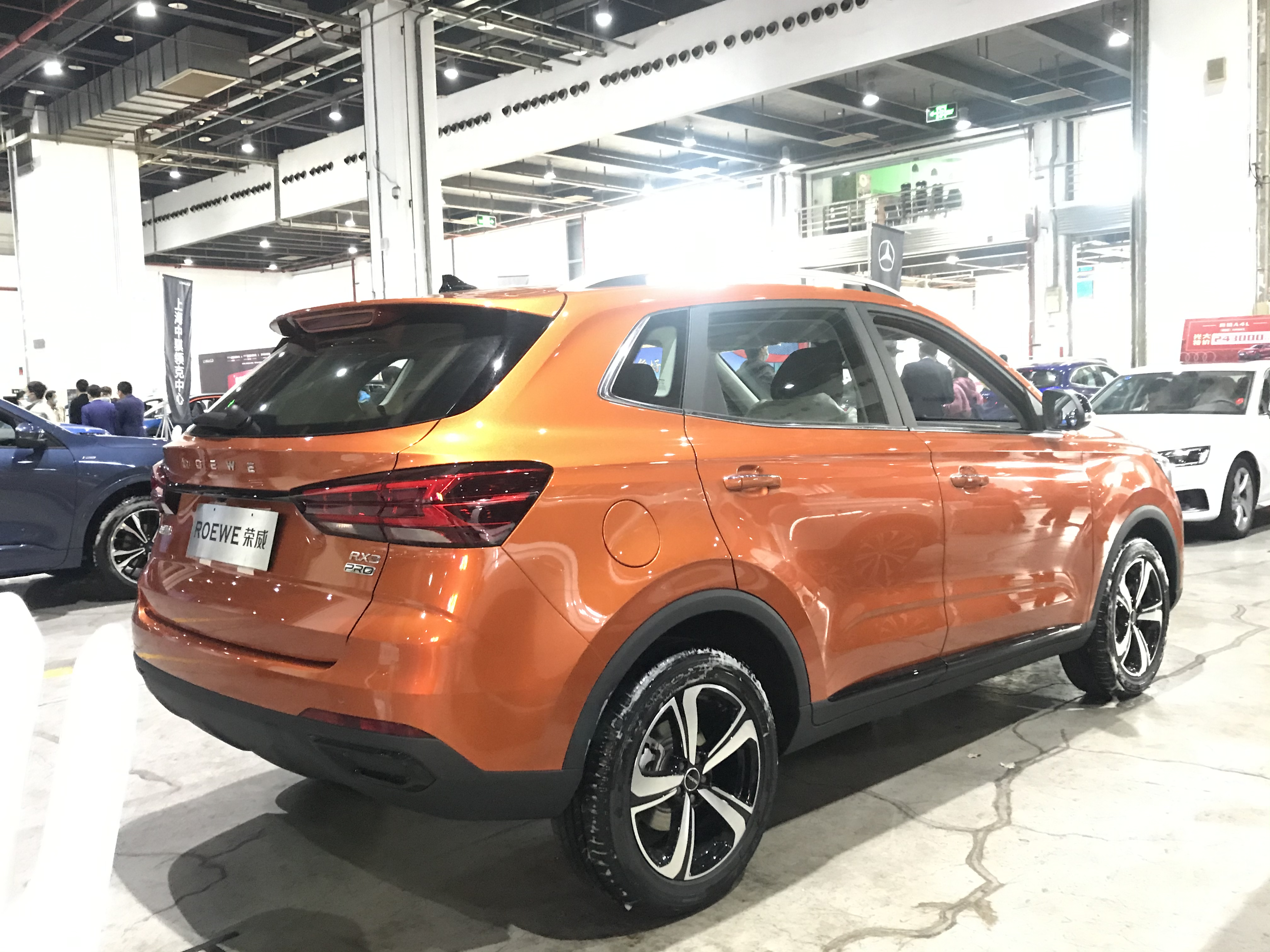
Roewe RX3 Pro (rear)

=== Roewe Totoro / Lomemo ===
Unveiled in May 2022, the Roewe Lomemo is a hybrid compact crossover variant based on the Roewe RX3 Pro. The original Chinese name translates to Totoro, and the English name is also a transliteration of the Chinese name pronunciation, Lóng Māo. The Lomemo features redesigned front and rear ends resulting in a slight length, width and height difference with the length extended to 4,440 mm (174.8 in) allowing it to be classified as a compact crossover. The updated design also resulted in a wider 1,810 mm (71.3 in) width and 1,634 mm (64.3 in) height while the wheelbase remains to be 2,625 mm (103.3 in). In terms of power, the Roewe Lomemo is equipped with a hybrid system consisting of a 1.5-litre engine and an electric motor. The maximum power output of the engine is 88 kilowatts (118 hp; 120 PS).

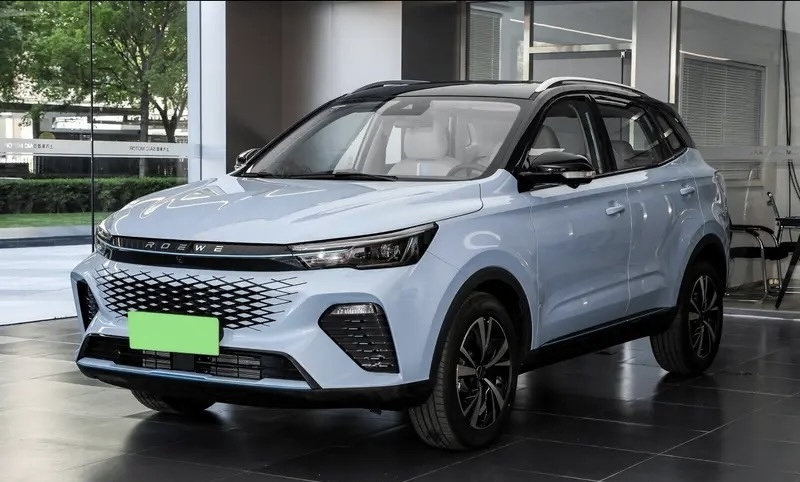
Roewe Lomemo (front)

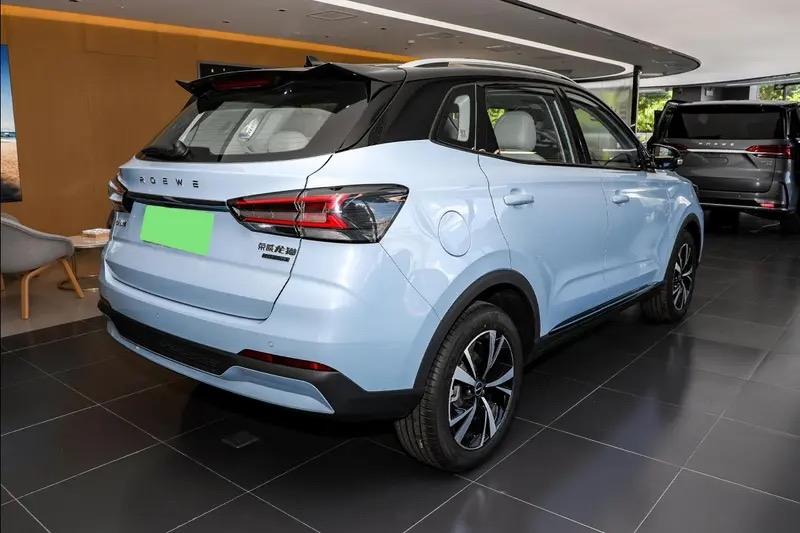
Roewe Lomemo (rear)
