= MG 4X =

Battery electric compact crossover SUV

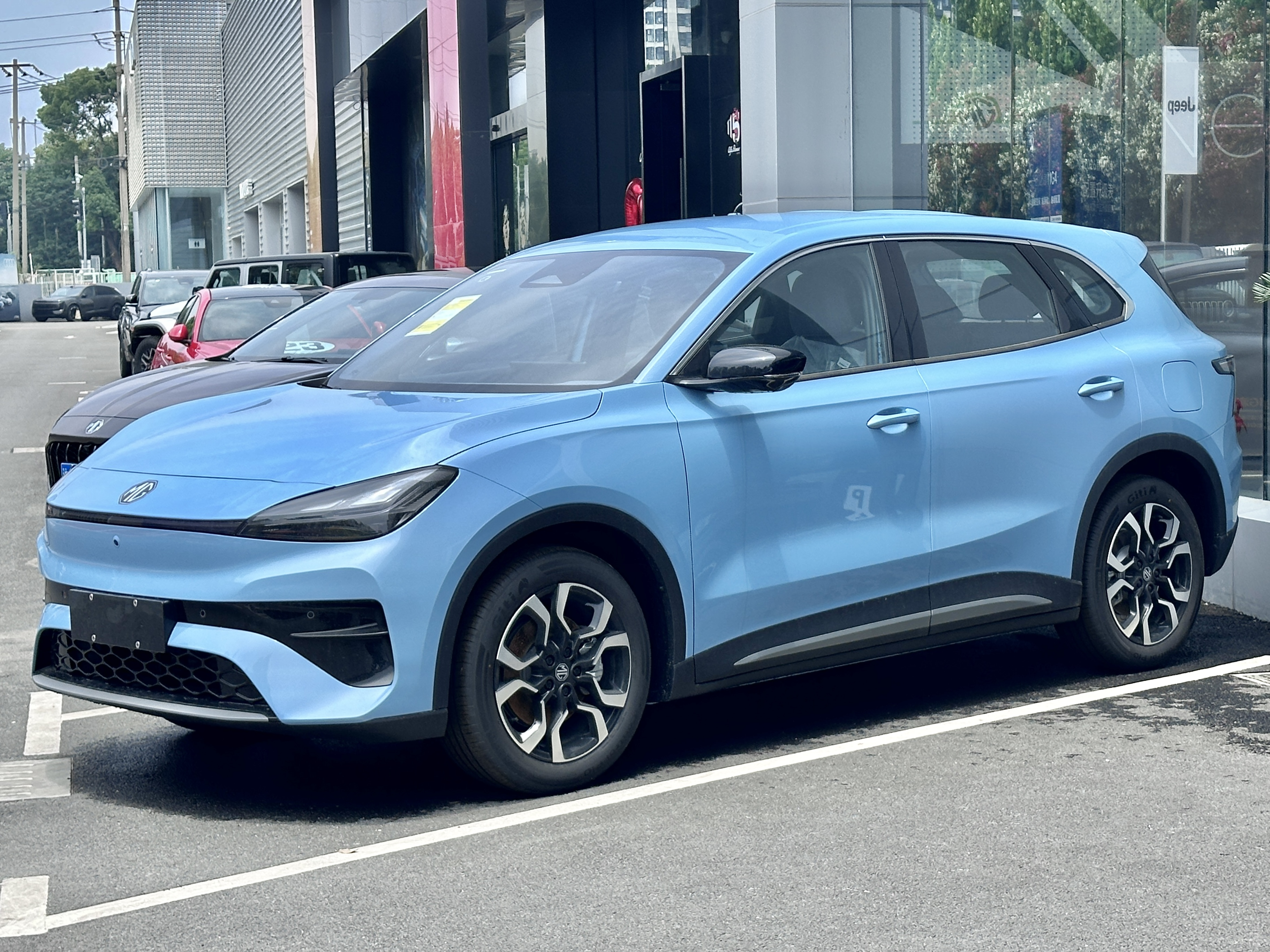

Overview
- Manufacturer: MG Motor, SAIC Motor
- Production: 2026–present
- Assembly: China: Zhengzhou (SAIC Motor Zhengzhou Plant)
- Designer: Jozef Kabaň

Body and chassis
- Class: Compact SUV
- Body style: 5-door crossover SUV
- Layout: Rear-motor, rear-wheel-drive
- Platform: Modular Scalable Platform
- Related: MG ES5 / MGS5 EV

Powertrain
- Electric motor: 163 PS (119.9 kW; 160.8 hp) PMSM
- Battery: 70 kWh LMO

Dimensions
- Wheelbase: 2,735 mm (107.7 in)
- Length: 4,500 mm (177.2 in)
- Width: 1,849 mm (72.8 in)
- Height: 1,621 mm (63.8 in)

Chronology
- Predecessor: MG ES5 (China)

The MG 4X is a battery electric compact SUV produced by SAIC Motor and sold under the MG brand since 2026.

== Overview ==
The 4X was first presented alongside the MG 07 on 10 March 2026. The 4X serves as an expansion to the MG4 nameplate and will be sold alongside the second-generation MG4. It is based on the Modular Scalable Platform and also shares the same body with the MGS5 EV. It made its official debut on 7 May 2026. Pre-sales commenced on 11 May 2026; sales began on 27 May 2026.

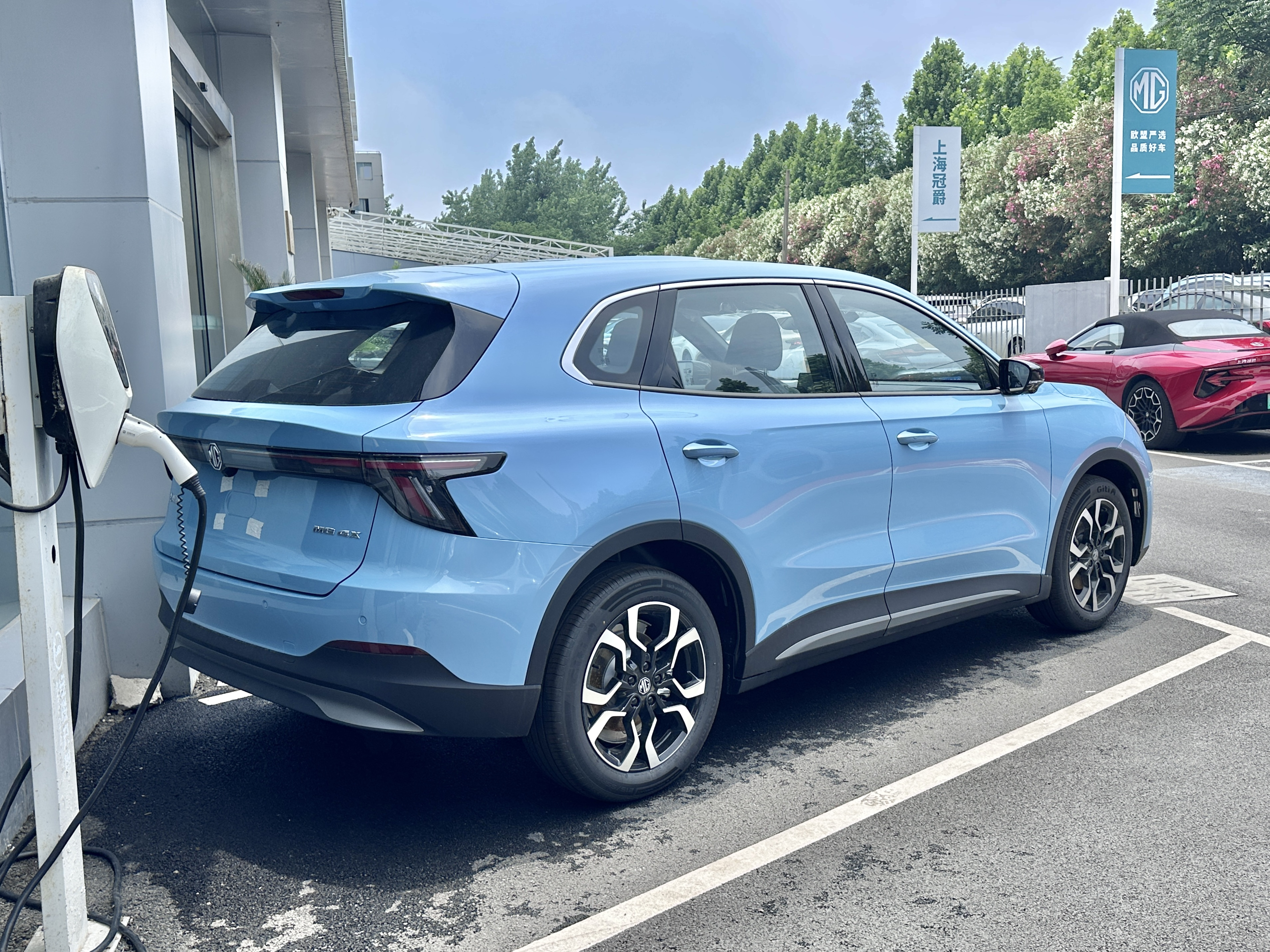
Rear view

== Powertrain ==
It has a claimed range of 317 miles (510 km) and uses a solid-state battery coupled with a rear-drive five-link independent suspension as standard equipment.
