= MG 07 =

MG 07 may refer to:

- MG 07 (vehicle), a battery electric and plug-in hybrid sedan made by MG
- MG7, a combustion engine powered sedan made by MG
- Maschinengewehr (Schwarzlose) M. 7, a heavy machine gun
