= MGS5 EV =

Battery electric compact crossover SUV

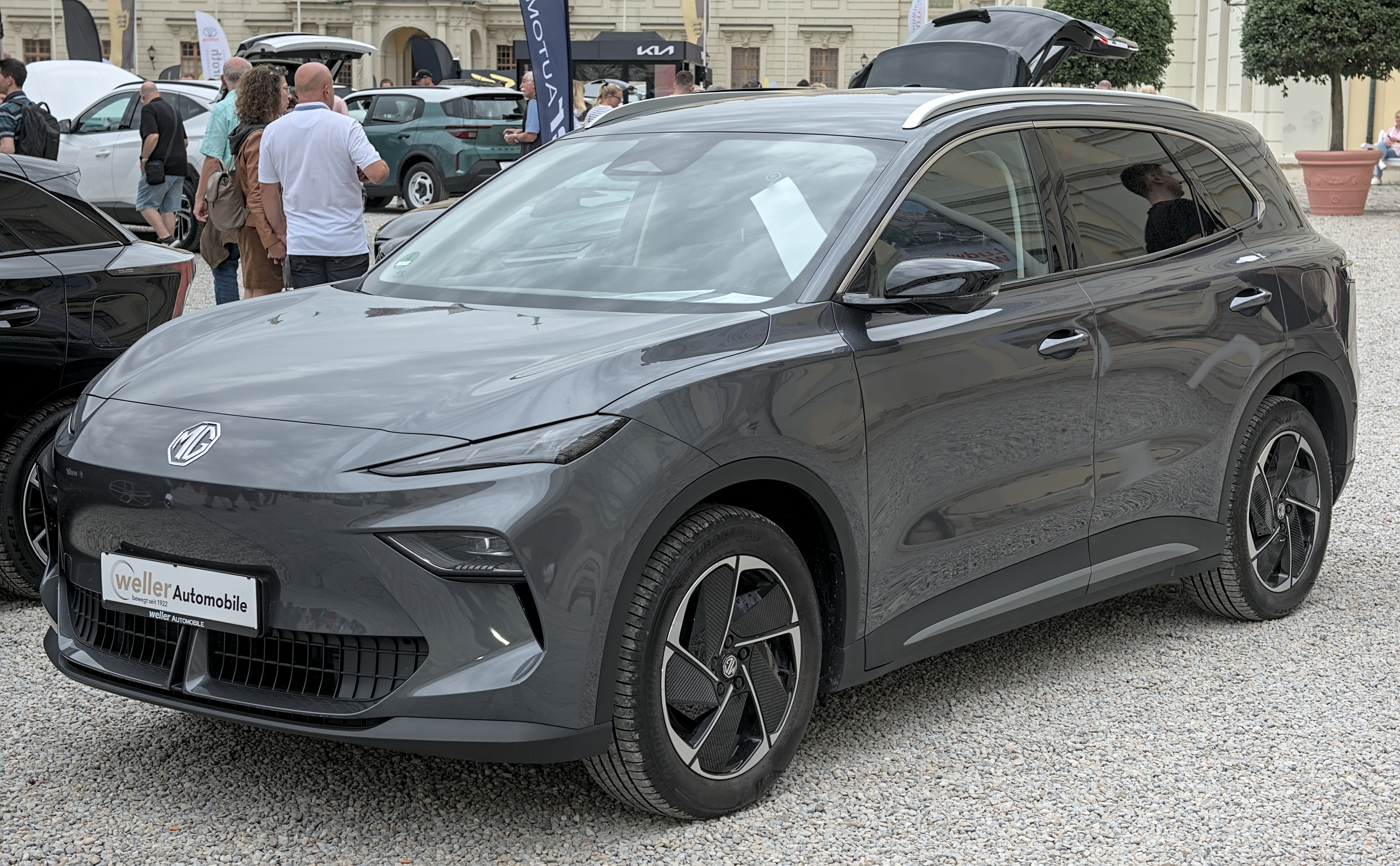

Overview
- Manufacturer: MG Motor, SAIC Motor
- Model code: ES34 (ZS3EM)
- Also called: MG ES5 (China)
- Production: 2024–2026 (China); 2025–present (export)
- Assembly: China: Ningde, Fujian; Thailand: Laem Chabang (SAIC-CP); Malaysia: Malacca (EPMB); Indonesia: Cikarang (SGMW Motor Indonesia)

Body and chassis
- Class: Compact crossover SUV (C)
- Body style: 5-door SUV
- Layout: Rear-motor, rear-wheel-drive
- Platform: Modular Scalable Platform / Nebula
- Related: MG 4X; MG4 EV (EH32); MGS6 EV; SAIC H5

Powertrain
- Electric motor: Permanent magnet synchronous
- Power output: 100 kW (134 hp; 136 PS) (Nepal, Singapore); 125 kW (168 hp; 170 PS); 180 kW (241 hp; 245 PS)
- Battery: 49.1 kWh CATL-SAIC LFP (China, Malaysia, Europe, Australia); 50 kWh CATL-SAIC LFP (Thailand); 62.2 kWh CATL-SAIC LFP (China, Thailand); 64 kWh CATL-SAIC NMC lithium-ion (Long range)
- Range: 425–525 km (264–326 mi) (CLTC); 440–550 km (273–342 mi) (NEDC)

Dimensions
- Wheelbase: 2,730 mm (107.5 in)
- Length: 4,476 mm (176.2 in)
- Width: 1,849 mm (72.8 in)
- Height: 1,621 mm (63.8 in)
- Kerb weight: 1,685–1,740 kg (3,715–3,836 lb)

Chronology
- Predecessor: MG ZS EV / EZS
- Successor: MG 4X (China)

The MGS5 EV or MG ES5 in China is a battery electric compact crossover SUV (C-segment) produced by the Chinese automotive manufacturer SAIC Motor under the British MG marque since 2024. It was introduced outside China in regions such as Europe and Thailand since March 2025 as the MGS5 EV.

== History ==
The model was initially registered to Chinese authorities as the MG S5, but it was renamed to ES5 shortly before its introduction. It made its official debut in China on 15 October 2024 and later started sales in China on 6 November 2024.

== Design ==
The exterior of the vehicle adopts the brand's design philosophy. It features split headlights with an air intake, a split air intake on the grille, conventional grab door handles, silver roof rails, and the rear taillight bar mimics the front lights.

The interior of the ES5 adopts a minimalistic approach. It has a 10.25-inch LCD instrument cluster and a 15.6-inch floating screen. The gear shifter used for the automatic transmission is mounted on the centre console, along with a wireless charging pad (some trims only), a pair of cupholders and additional storage space below.

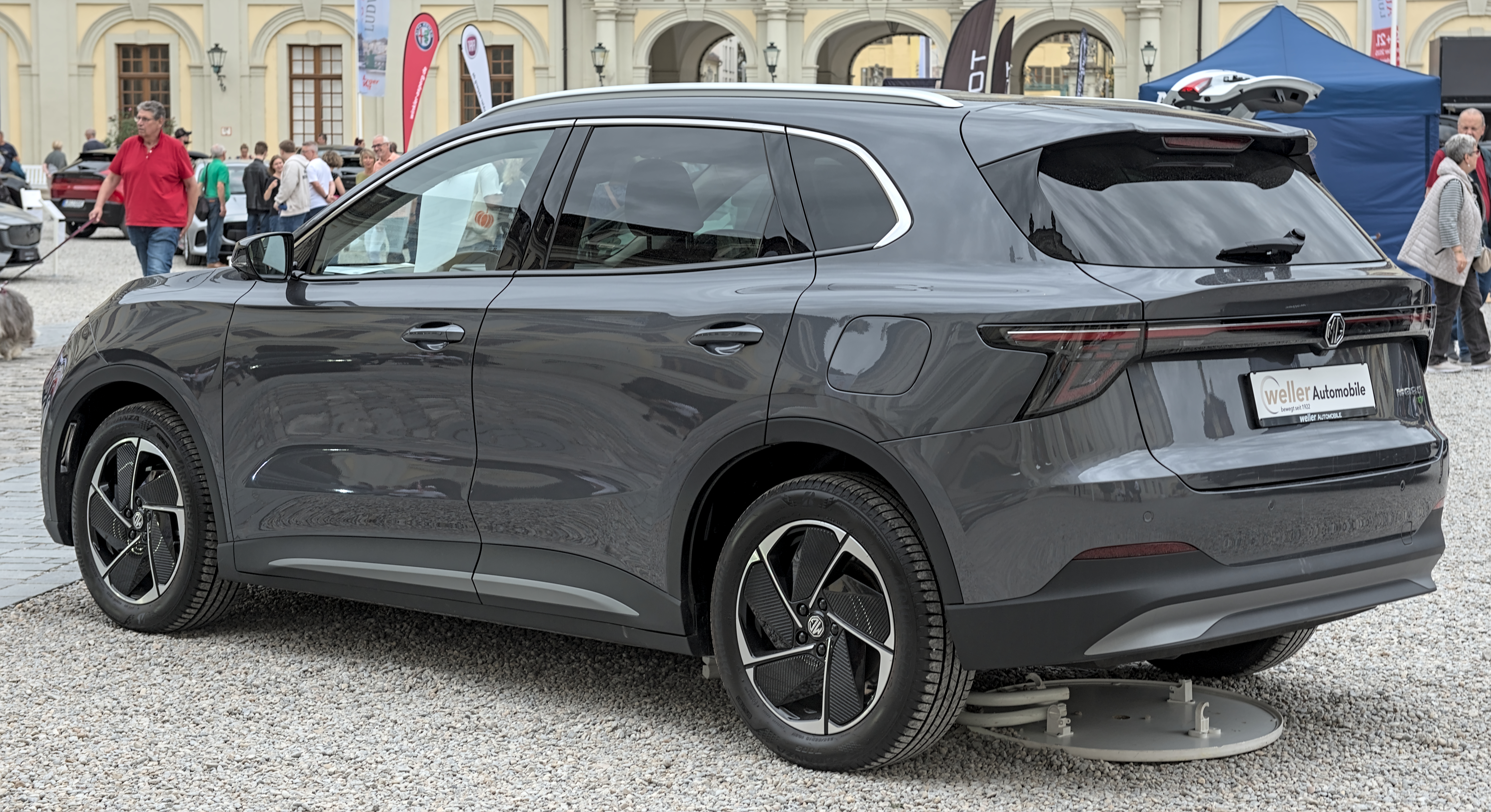
Rear view

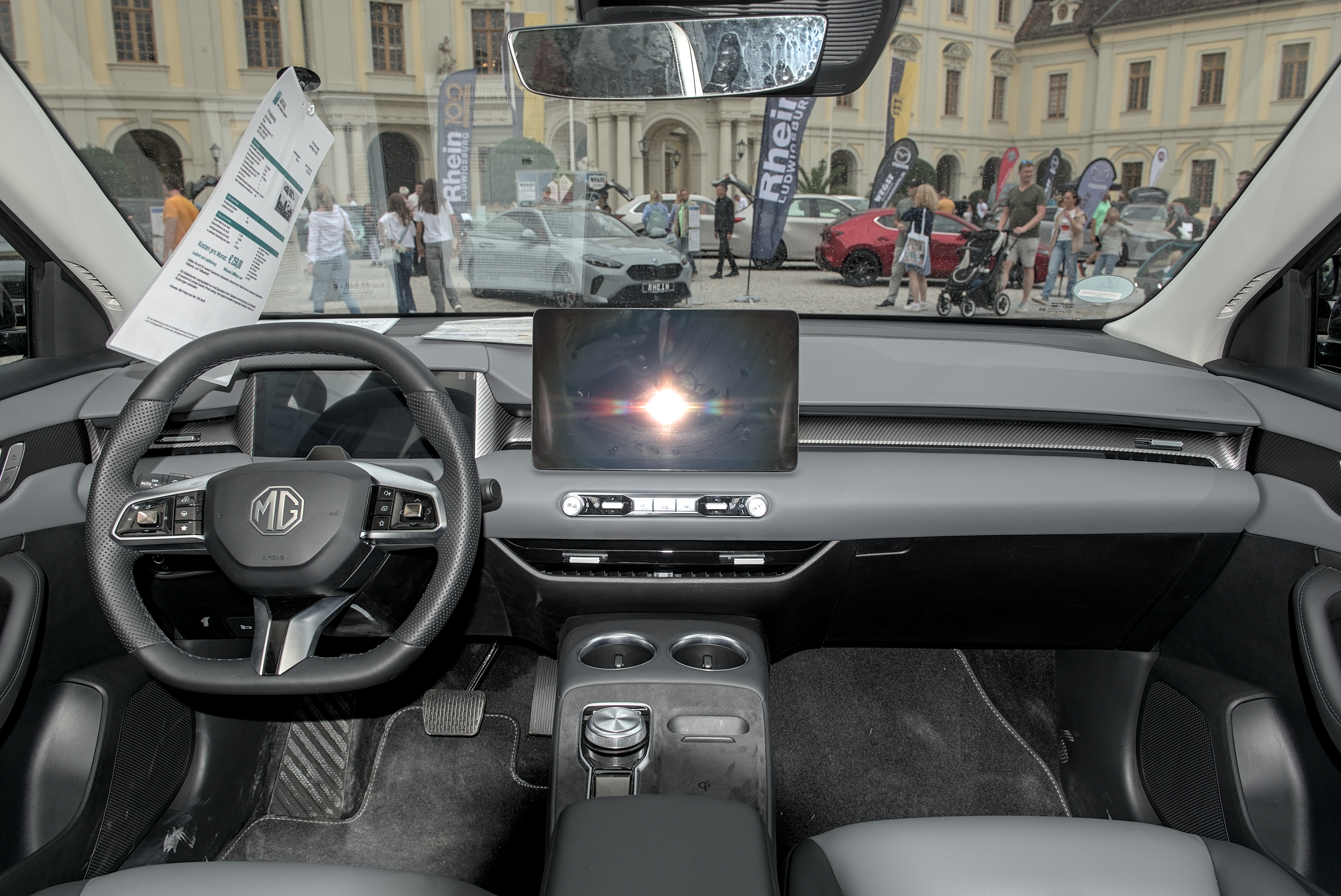
Interior

== Specifications ==
The ES5 / MGS5 EV is powered by a rear-mounted 125 kW (168 hp; 170 PS) motor. It is based on SAIC’s Nebula battery electric architecture, with MacPherson struts for the front and a five-link independent suspension for the rear. The ES5 / MGS5 EV has a centre of gravity 530 mm (53 cm) and a 50-50 weight distribution between the front and rear axles.

== Markets ==
=== Asia ===
==== China ====
In China, the model is marketed as the MG ES5. It is available in three trim levels: Pro, Plus and Max. It is available with 49.1 kWh (425), 62.2 kWh (515), and 64 kWh (525) powertrain options.

==== Indonesia ====
The MGS5 EV was launched in Indonesia on 5 February 2026 at the 33rd Indonesia International Motor Show, with three variants: Ignite (49 kWh), Magnify (49 kWh) and Magnify Max (62 kWh). It is locally assembled at SGMW's Cikarang plant.

==== Malaysia ====
The MGS5 EV was launched in Malaysia on 20 May 2025, with three variants: Com 49 kWh, Com 62 kWh and Lux 62 kWh. Local CKD assembly commenced on 10 March 2026 at contract manufacturer EPMB's assembly plant in Malacca.

The local CKD assembled MGS5 EV was launched in Malaysia on 24 April 2026, in the sole Lux 62 kWh variant. The CKD model received leatherette seat upholstery (partial leather upholstery on the CBU model), a powered front passenger seat, the 62 kWh powertrain was updated to produce 151 kW (202 hp; 205 PS) and 350 N⋅m (258 lb⋅ft) of torque, and the electric range was increased to 446 km (277 mi). In August 2026, the Com 49 kWh variant was reintroduced to the line-up as a locally assembled variant.

==== Philippines ====
The MGS5 EV was launched in the Philippines on 27 August 2026, in the sole unnamed variant using the 49 kWh LFP battery pack.

==== Singapore ====
The MGS5 EV was launched in Singapore on 10 April 2025, in the sole Luxury (62 kWh) variant.

==== Thailand ====
The MGS5 EV was launched in Thailand on 25 March 2025, with three trim levels: D, X and V. It is available with Standard Range (50 kWh) and Long Range (64 kWh) powertrain options. The D+ trim replaced the D trim in August 2025.

In January 2026, the Thai-market MGS5 EV receive several changes. The X and V trim levels was replaced with X+ and V+ trim levels respectively. Both variants receive larger 15.6-inch screen, with redesigned center console and column-mounted shifter. The V+ trim received a 62.2 kWh LFP battery to replace the previous 64 kWh NMC battery.

=== Europe ===
The MGS5 EV debuted in Europe with sales started in the UK in April 2025 and later debuted in other European countries in the second quarter of the same year. In the UK, it is available with three variants: SE Standard Range (49 kWh), SE Long Range (64 kWh) and Trophy Long Range (64 kWh).

=== Latin America ===
==== Brazil ====
The MGS5 EV was launched in Brazil on 20 November 2025, as part of MG's return to the Brazilian market. It is available with two trim levels: Comfort and Luxury, it is available with the 64 kWh NMC battery pack.

=== Oceania ===
==== Australia ====
The MGS5 EV was launched in Australia on 30 April 2025, with two trim levels: Excite and Essence. It is available with 49 kWh and 62 kWh LFP battery options. In July 2026, the Excite trim was discontinued.

==== New Zealand ====
The MGS5 EV was launched in New Zealand on 7 July 2025, with four variants: Excite 49, Essence 49, Excite 62 and Essence 62, it is available with 49 kWh and 62 kWh LFP battery options.

== Safety ==
=== ANCAP ===
ANCAP test results MG MGS5 EV (2025, aligned with Euro NCAP)
Test	Points	%
Overall:	5 /5 stars	
Adult occupant:	36.22	90%
Child occupant:	42.58	86%
Pedestrian:	51.68	82%
Safety assist:	14.39	79%

=== ASEAN NCAP ===
ASEAN NCAP test results MG MGS5 EV (2025)
Test	Points
Overall:	5 /5 stars
Adult occupant:	37.90
Child occupant:	16.99
Safety assist:	20.00
Motorcyclist Safety:	17.50

=== Euro NCAP ===
Euro NCAP test results MGS5 EV (LHD) (2025)
Test	Points	%
Overall:	5 /5 stars	
Adult occupant:	36.2	90%
Child occupant:	40.2	82%
Pedestrian:	51.9	82%
Safety assist:	14.1	78%

== Sales ==
Year	China	Thailand
2024	1,458	
2025	5,265	3,004
