= Lithium ion manganese oxide battery =

Type of lithium-ion cell

A lithium ion manganese oxide battery (LMO) is a lithium-ion cell that uses manganese dioxide (MnO_{2}) as the cathode material. They function through the same intercalation/de-intercalation mechanism as other commercialized secondary battery technologies, such as lithium cobalt oxide (LiCoO_{2}). Cathodes based on manganese-oxide components are earth-abundant, inexpensive, non-toxic, and provide better thermal stability.

== Compounds ==
=== Spinel LiMn_{2}O_{4} ===
==== Structure ====
One of the more studied manganese oxide-based cathodes is LiMn_{2}O_{4}, a cation ordered member of the spinel structural family (space group Fd3m). In addition to containing inexpensive materials, the three-dimensional structure of LiMn_{2}O_{4} lends itself to high rate capability by providing a well connected framework for the insertion and de-insertion of Li^{+} ions during discharge and charge of the battery. In particular, the Li^{+} ions occupy the tetrahedral sites within the Mn_{2}O_{4} polyhedral frameworks adjacent to empty octahedral sites. As a consequence of this structural arrangement, batteries based on LiMn_{2}O_{4} cathodes have demonstrated a higher rate-capability compared to materials with two-dimensional frameworks for Li^{+} diffusion.

LiMn_{2}O_{4}→Li_{1−x}Mn_{2}O_{4}+xLi^{+}+xe^{−}

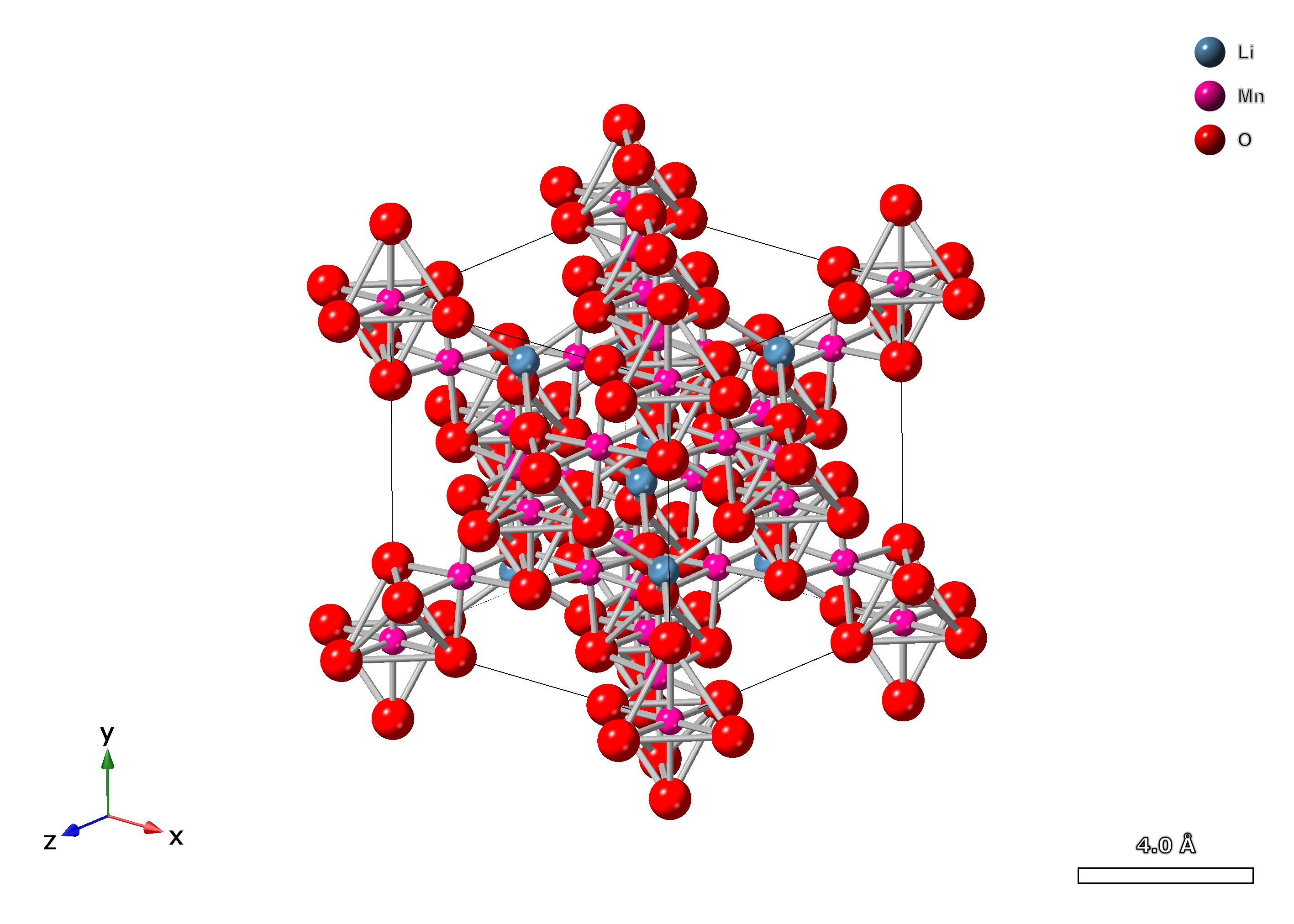
3D crystal structure of spinel LiMn_{2}O_{4}

==== Electrochemical performance ====
Electrochemical performance of LiMn_{2}O_{4}
Theoretical capacity (mAh/g)	148
Practical Capacity (mAh/g)	110
Operating Voltage (V)	4
Gravimetric energy density (Wh kg^{−1})	410
Volumetric energy density (Wh/L)	1300
Cost	Low
Advantage	Cheap and good performance
Disadvantage	Poor cycling stability and performance at high temperature

==== Challenges of LiMn_{2}O_{4} under high voltage ====
The voltage, capacity, and current density that are practically reached in real batteries are significantly impacted by the contact potential and kinetic effects. Kinetic variables, which frequently arise at the contact and continuously change over time as a result of degradation events, thus govern the electrochemical performance. Critical issues are presented by these events, especially with regard to high voltage stability.

===== Surface distortions =====
Applying a high voltage to a spinel-structured cathode may induce partial spinel-to-layered transformation on the surface region. The distortion of the surface structure can be extended to the bulk level.

Since layered structures and spinel share an oxygen sub-lattice of the cubic close-packed structure, the evolution of layered structure from spinel only necessitates the migration of Mn from 16d octahedral interstices to another, passing through the tetrahedral interim site without the need for oxygen reordering.

Face-sharing cations have a strong repulsion and a little separation, making this an adverse energy process that is unlikely to occur unless another event facilitates it. Mn can only migrate across these tetrahedral interstices if a tiny quantity of oxygen is removed.

Mn^{4+} ions are reduced to Mn^{3+} ions or even lower as a result of oxygen non-stoichiometry because of the required charge adjustment. Mn^{3+} and Mn^{4+} ions are dispersed throughout half of the octahedral site in LiMn_{2}O_{4}. In the spinel structure, the Mn^{3+} ions have demonstrated a predilection for tetrahedral 8a sites with high mobility.

===== Interfacial reactions between cathode and electrolyte =====
Because of their strong nucleophilic and Lewis's base characteristics, cathode materials can interact with oxygen atoms in the electrolyte to cause redox reactions. The electrolyte will be reduced on the anode surface and oxidized on the cathode surface once the electrode potential exceeds the typical electrolyte stability window. This will result in the formation of solid electrolyte interphase (SEI) and cathode-electrolyte interface (CEI) layers, respectively. By passivating the electrode and blocking electron transport, the CEI layer would stabilize the electrode and electrolyte.

It is commonly known that oxygen is necessary for the formation of the CEI layer and electrolyte breakdown. At high voltage, the electrolytes containing LiPF_{6} salts become unstable. They can create a highly concentrated acidic species (HF) when they combine with a small amount of water, which acts as an oxygen source. By causing a disproportionate reaction, the HF damages the electrode materials' surface, which is the main reason why Mn dissolves. The dissolved Mn^{2+} may either settle on the anode surface and spontaneously reduce to metallic Mn, or it could mix with F^{−} to create MnF_{2}.

===== Stress-Induced cracking =====
Stress is produced in the LiB system by the anisotropic lattice expansion and contraction along with the repetitive Li-insertion and extraction. Stress can cause cracking, which can start at the grain boundaries and spread until the particles are completely ground up.

LiMn_{2}O_{4} cathode materials suffer ca. 8% lattice volume expansion and contraction for each charge and discharge cycle between LiMn_{2}O_{4} and λ-MnO_{2}.

The orientation of Mn–O bonding sublattices regulates the production of LiMn_{2}O_{4} cracks, according to the first principles-based study. Because of Mn oxidation and the lower radius of Mn^{4+} ions compared to Mn^{3+} ions, the delithiation state of LiMn_{2}O_{4} encourages strain-driven Mn–O bond compression. These surface bonds are unable to completely shorten to the equilibrium bond lengths due to the fixed lattice parameters of the LiMn_{2}O_{4} host structure. Tensile surface tension is thus the result of these conflicting pressures acting on the near-surface Mn–O bond. The production of surface cracks that spread into bulk LiMn_{2}O_{4} may be initiated by these high tensile surface stresses.

==== Strategies for high voltage stabilization ====
===== Doping =====
A workable method to prevent Jahn-Teller distortion, stabilize the crystal lattice, and improve LiMn_{2}O_{4}'s electrochemical performance is to dope or partially substitute pure LiMn_{2}O_{4} with other elements. A number of doping elements, including Al, Ni, Fe, Mg, Si, and B, have been shown to be effective.

For instance, the Al^{3+} occupation in sites 8a and 16d prevented Mn^{2+} ions from moving to dissolve in the electrolyte and reduced the likelihood of Mn disproportion. Modification of Al^{3+} ions also decreased the electrolyte breakdown products that were deposited on LiMn_{2}O_{4}'s surface. The surface may be significantly shielded from HF assaults by the Al^{3+} ions.

===== Surface coating =====
It is a controllable and effective way of preserving the CEI layer and reducing the side reactions. The presence of the metal oxide coatings can minimize the direct contact area of the LiMn_{2}O_{4}/electrolyte interface and suppress the dissolution of Mn^{3+} ions.

The coating materials comprise principally various metal fluoride, metal oxide, carbon, lithium-ion conductor, and polymer. Among them, TiO_{2} was claimed to have channels that could be utilized to store small Li^{+}. Spinel LiMn_{2}O_{4} surface modification may further limit Mn dissolution over cycles and postpone electrode-electrolyte side reactions.

===== Concentration-gradient designs =====
The incoherent of lattice contraction and expansion between coating layer and core structure would lead to the formation of voids and cracks during repeated cycle at high cut-off voltage. Therefore, designing concentration gradient structure without any apparent gap between the shell and core structure has been proposed to enhance the stability.

=== Layered Li_{2}MnO_{3} ===
Li_{2}MnO_{3} is a lithium rich layered rocksalt structure that is made of alternating layers of lithium ions and lithium and manganese ions in a 1:2 ratio, similar to the layered structure of LiCoO_{2}. In the nomenclature of layered compounds it can be written Li(Li_{0.33}Mn_{0.67})O_{2}. Although Li_{2}MnO_{3} is electrochemically inactive, it can be charged to a high potential (4.5 V v.s Li^{0}) in order to undergo lithiation/de-lithiation or delithiated using an acid leaching process followed by mild heat treatment. However, extracting lithium from Li_{2}MnO_{3} at such a high potential can also be charge compensated by loss of oxygen from the electrode surface which leads to poor cycling stability. New allotropes of Li_{2}MnO_{3} have been discovered which have better structural stability against oxygen release (longer cycle-life).

=== Layered LiMnO_{2} ===
The layered manganese oxide LiMnO_{2} is constructed from corrugated layers of manganese/oxide octahedra and is electrochemically unstable. The distortions and deviation from truly planar metal oxide layers are a manifestation of the electronic configuration of the Mn(III) Jahn-Teller ion. A layered variant, isostructural with LiCoO_{2}, was prepared in 1996 by ion exchange from the layered compound NaMnO_{2}, however long term cycling and the defect nature of the charged compound led to structural degradation and cation equilibration to other phases.

=== Layered Li_{2}MnO_{2} ===
The layered manganese oxide Li_{2}MnO_{2} is structurally related to Li_{2}MnO_{3} and LiCoO_{2} with similar transition metal oxide layers separated by a layer containing two lithium cations occupying the available two tetrahedral sites in the lattice rather the one octahedral site. The material is typically made by low voltage lithiation of the parent compound, direct lithiation using liquid ammonia, or via use of an organic lithiating reagent. Stability on cycling has been demonstrated in symmetric cells although due to Mn(II) formation and dissolution cycling degradation is expected. Stabilization of the structure using dopants and substitutions to decrease the amount of reduced manganese cations has been a successful route to extending the cycle life of these lithium rich reduced phases. These layered manganese oxide layers are so rich in lithium.

=== x Li_{2}MnO_{3} • y Li_{1+a}Mn_{2-a}O_{4} • z LiMnO_{2} composites ===
One of the main research efforts in the field of lithium-manganese oxide electrodes for lithium-ion batteries involves developing composite electrodes using structurally integrated layered Li_{2}MnO_{3}, layered LiMnO_{2}, and spinel LiMn_{2}O_{4}, with a chemical formula of x Li_{2}MnO_{3} • y Li_{1+a}Mn_{2-a}O_{4} • z LiMnO_{2}, where x+y+z=1. The combination of these structures provides increased structural stability during electrochemical cycling while achieving higher capacity and rate-capability. A rechargeable capacity in excess of 250 mAh/g was reported in 2005 using this material, which has nearly twice the capacity of current commercialized rechargeable batteries of the same dimensions.

== See also ==
- List of battery types
- List of battery sizes
- Comparison of battery types
