= MG Cyberster =

Battery electric roadster

- MG Cyberster XPower

Overview
- Manufacturer: MG Motor, SAIC Motor
- Model code: EC32
- Also called: MG Cyber GTS (coupé)
- Production: 2023–present
- Assembly: China: Ningde, Fujian
- Designer: Carl Gotham, Joscha Thielen

Body and chassis
- Class: Sports car/grand tourer (S)
- Body style: 2-door convertible; 2-door coupé (Cyber GTS)
- Layout: Rear-motor, rear-wheel drive; Dual-motor, all-wheel-drive
- Platform: Modular Scalable Platform
- Doors: Scissor

Powertrain
- Electric motor: 4× liquid-cooled permanent magnet synchronous
- Power output: 231–400 kW (310–536 hp; 314–544 PS)
- Battery: 64 kWh NMC CATL; 77 kWh NMC CATL
- Range: 501–580 km (311–360 mi) (CLTC); 503 km (313 mi) (77kWh AWD, NEDC)
- Plug-in charging: DC: 144 kW

Dimensions
- Wheelbase: 2,690 mm (105.9 in)
- Length: 4,535 mm (178.5 in)
- Width: 1,913 mm (75.3 in)
- Height: 1,329 mm (52.3 in)
- Kerb weight: 1,850–1,984 kg (4,079–4,374 lb)

Chronology
- Predecessor: MG F/MG TF

The MG Cyberster is a battery electric car produced by SAIC Motor under the MG marque since 2023. It is a two-door roadster with rear-motor, rear-wheel drive and dual-motor, all-wheel-drive variants. The vehicle was previewed as a concept car with the same name in 2021. In 2024, MG displayed a two-door coupé concept version of the Cyberster called the Cyber GTS.

== Overview ==
=== Concept car ===
The MG Cyberster concept car was unveiled in pictures on 30 March 2021 and then presented at the Auto Shanghai on 19 April. It was to be presented in 2020, but following the COVID-19 pandemic its presentation was postponed.

The Cyberster receives rear lights incorporating the United Kingdom flag (Union Jack) and interactive "Magic Eye" headlights that would pop up when turned on. It is electrically powered and has a range of 800 km (500 mi).

The MG Cyberster is a "gaming style" EV concept that is inspired by the legendary MGB Roadster of the 60s. The Cyberster concept was first shown at the Shanghai Auto Show in 2021. It was unveiled at the 38th Motor Expo in December 2021.

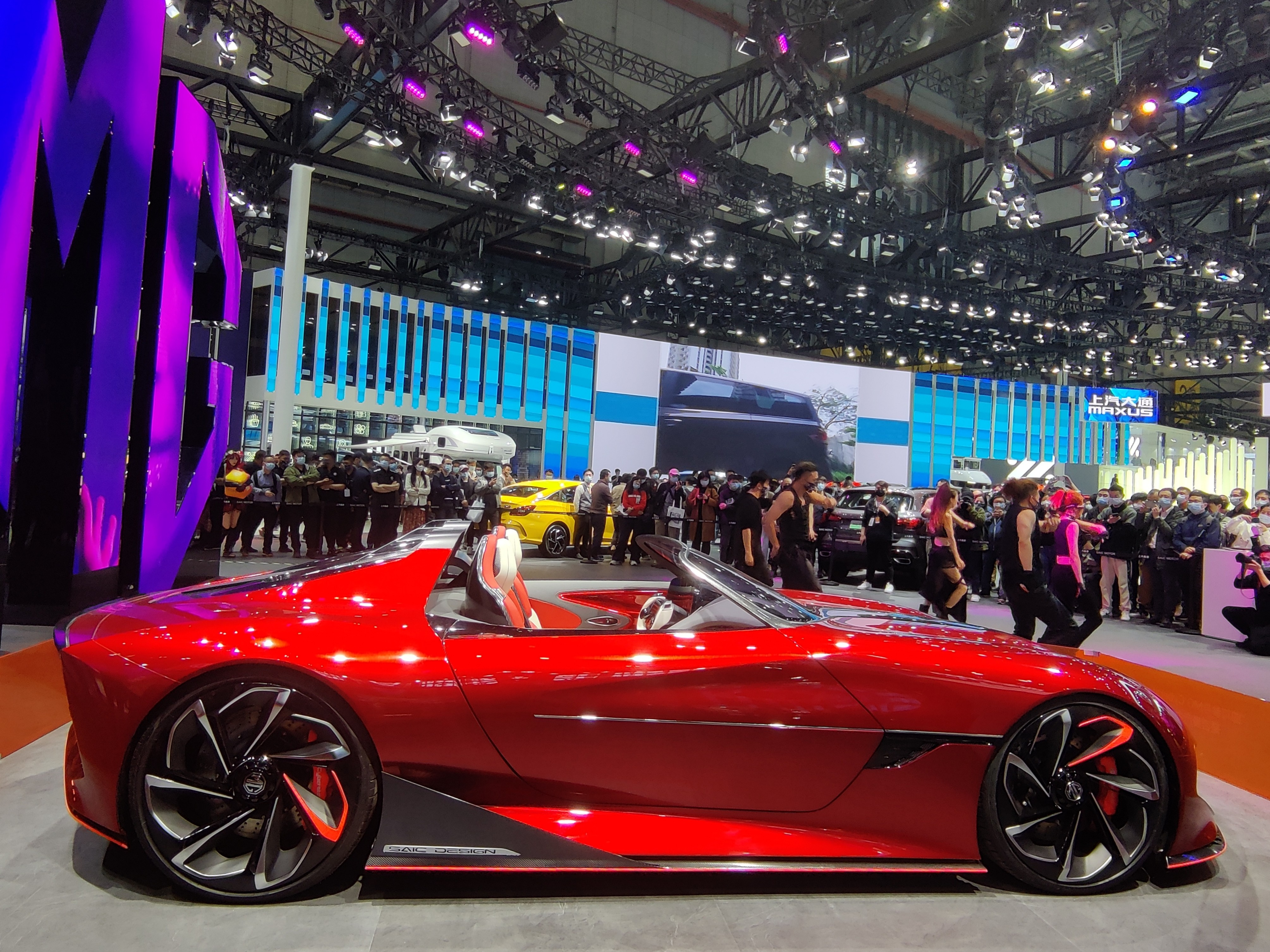
MG Cyberster prototype at the 2021 Auto Shanghai

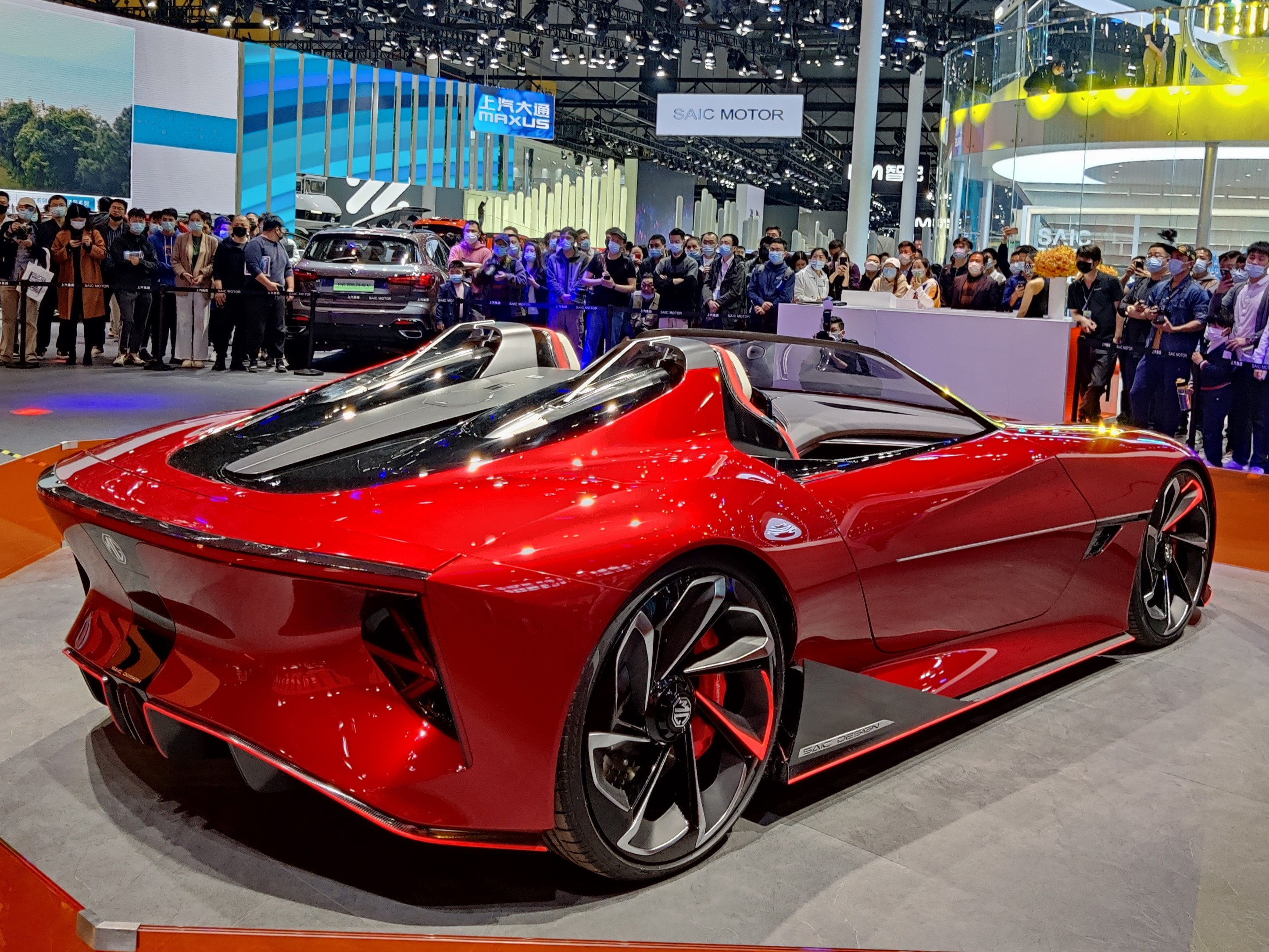
Rear view

=== Production model ===
A pre-production version of the production car was revealed to UK press in April 2023 showing the popup headlights have been dropped and showing the scissor doors. MG also released a video interview with Carl Gotham, advanced design director at SAIC Motor UK discussing the design philosophy of the car.

The red right-hand drive pre-production car and a red left-hand drive model (also pre-production but with slight differences such as the door handles), made the car's world public debut at the Goodwood Festival of Speed 13–16 July 2023, including runs up the hill.

Photographs of the production interior were released by MG in China in July 2023. Specifications were detailed in August 2023. The Cyberster is based on the Modular Scalable Platform, with two powertrain options. The most powerful version adopts a dual-motor all-wheel drive setup, producing 400 kW (536 hp; 544 PS) and 725 N⋅m (73.9 kg⋅m; 535 lb⋅ft) of torque. It is equipped with a 77 kWh battery with a CLTC-rated range of 580 km (360 mi). MG claimed a 0–62 mph (0–100 km/h) figure of 3.2 seconds. A lighter rear-wheel drive version is offered with a smaller 64 kWh battery and 231 kW (310 hp; 314 PS) power output.

The Cyberster is equipped with Bose-branded speakers and an infotainment system powered by a Qualcomm Snapdragon 8155 chip and the Unreal Engine 4 graphics engine.

The Cyberster has been described as a sports car as well as a grand tourer. It has been regarded as MG's halo car and flagship model.

Rear view

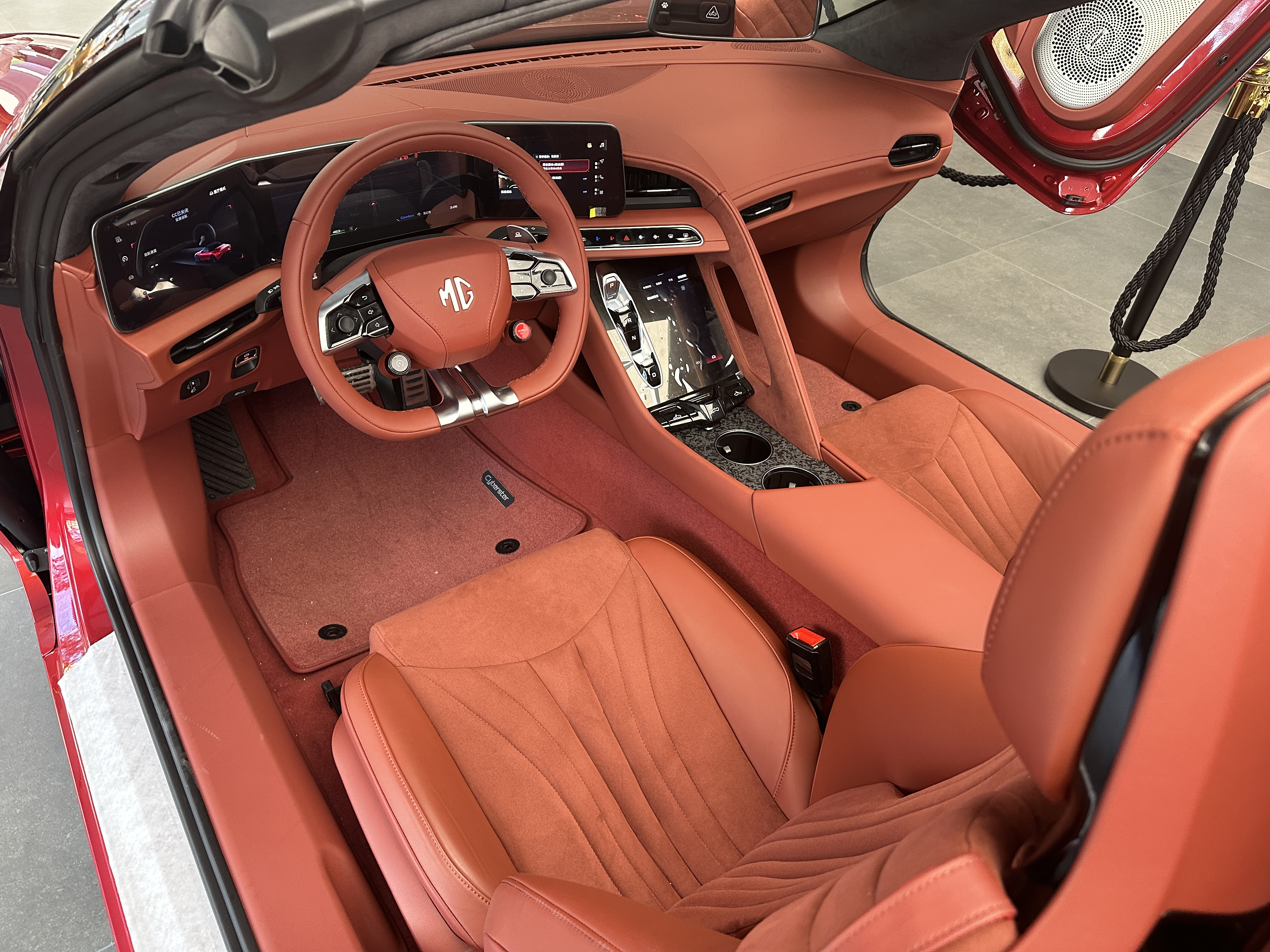
Interior

MG Cyber GTS concept

Rear view

== Powertrain ==
Specs
Battery	Layout	Years	Range (CLTC)	Power	Torque	0–100 km/h (62 mph) (Official)	Top speed
64 kWh; Li-NMC	RWD	2023–present	501 km (311 mi)	231 kW (314 PS; 310 hp)	475 N⋅m (350 lb⋅ft)	4.9s	193 km/h (120 mph)
77 kWh; Li-NMC	RWD	2023–present	580 km (360 mi)	250 kW (340 PS; 335 hp)	475 N⋅m (350 lb⋅ft)	4.9s	195 km/h (121 mph)
77 kWh; Li-NMC	AWD	2023–present	520 km (320 mi)	400 kW (544 PS; 536 hp)	725 N⋅m (535 lb⋅ft)	3.2s	200 km/h (124 mph)

== Sales and production ==
Year	Sales				Total production
Year	China	Thailand	Mexico	Indonesia	Total production
2023	558		—	—	887
2024	690	62 (Note: Figures based on registration (Thailand))	—	27	3,664
2025	256		68	13	
