= SAIC H5 =

Mid-size crossover SUV

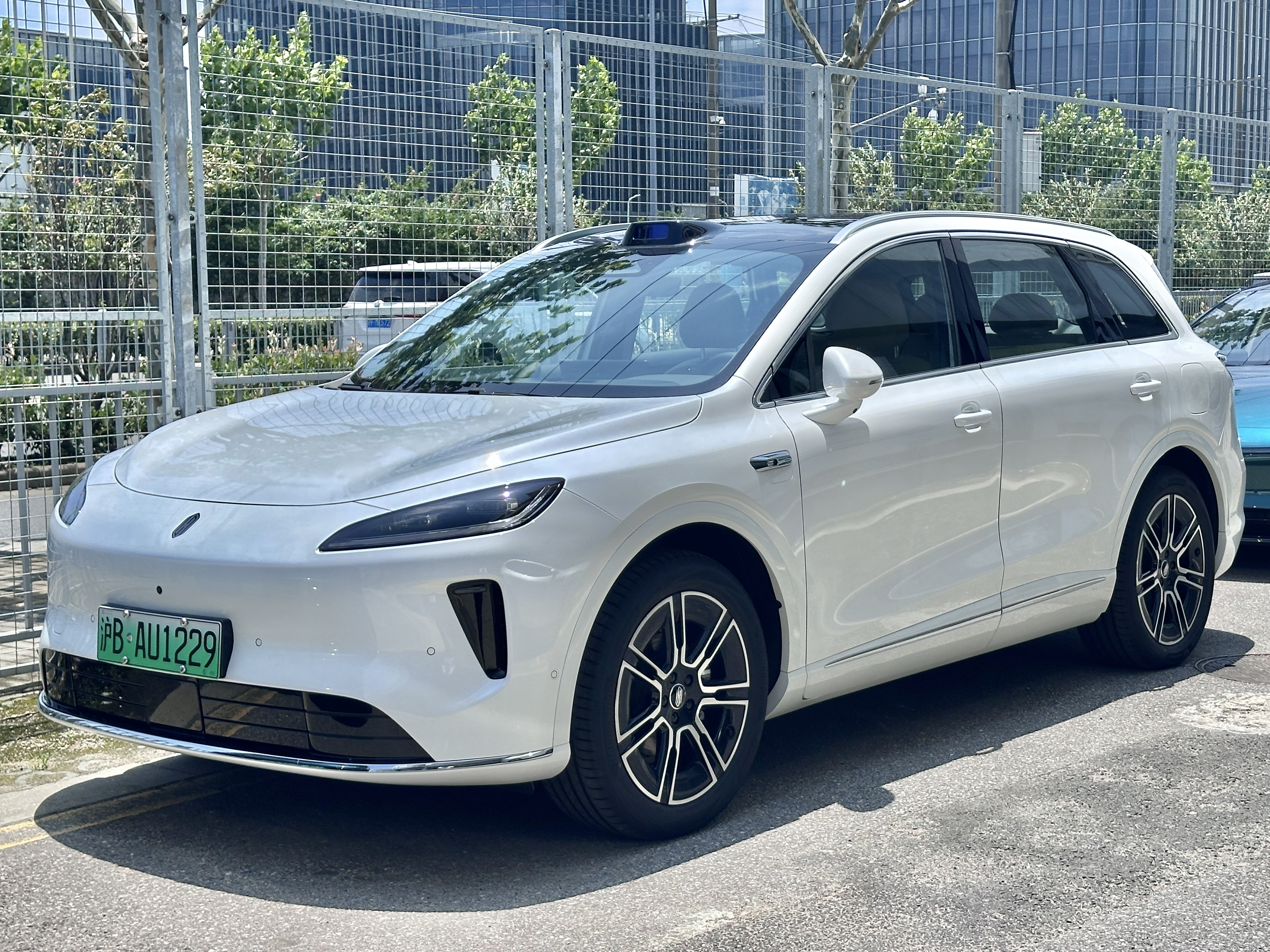

Overview
- Manufacturer: SAIC Motor
- Model code: ES39
- Production: 2025–present
- Assembly: China: Shanghai

Body and chassis
- Class: Mid-size SUV (D)
- Body style: 5-door SUV
- Layout: Battery electric: Rear-motor, rear-wheel-drive; Range-extended EV: Front-engine, rear-motor, rear-wheel-drive
- Platform: SAIC Xingyun (Nebula) platform
- Related: MGS6 EV

Powertrain
- Engine: Gasoline range extender: 1.5 L 15FMC naturally aspirated I4
- Power output: 200–240 hp (150–180 kW; 200–240 PS)
- Hybrid drivetrain: Series hybrid
- Battery: 64.6 kWh LFP (EV); 80 kWh LFP (EV); 32.6 kWh LFP (EREV)
- Range: 525–655 km (326–407 mi) (EV); 1,360 km (850 mi) (EREV)
- Electric range: 235 km (146 mi) (EREV)

Dimensions
- Wheelbase: 2,840 mm (111.8 in)
- Length: 4,780 mm (188.2 in)
- Width: 1,910 mm (75.2 in)
- Height: 1,657–1,664 mm (65.2–65.5 in)
- Curb weight: 1,985 kg (4,376 lb)

The SAIC H5 (Chinese: 尚界H5; pinyin: Shàngjiè H5) is a battery electric and range extender mid-size SUV manufactured by SAIC Motor in collaboration with Huawei. Based on the later released MGS6 EV, it is the first model of the SAIC sub-brand of the Harmony Intelligent Mobility Alliance. The marque is SAIC is also the name of its manufacturer.

== History ==
The H5 is the first model of the SAIC has developed with Huawei. It is a mid-size SUV with all-electric and range-extended powertrain options. Final major regulatory procedures were completed in July 2025.

Teasers of the H5 were first shown in July 2025. The H5 is assembled in the Lingang area of Shanghai, located close to Tesla's Gigafactory 3.

Pre-sales of the H5 started on August 25, 2025 as the cheapest model of any HIMA brand. The H5 officially launched on September 23, 2025.

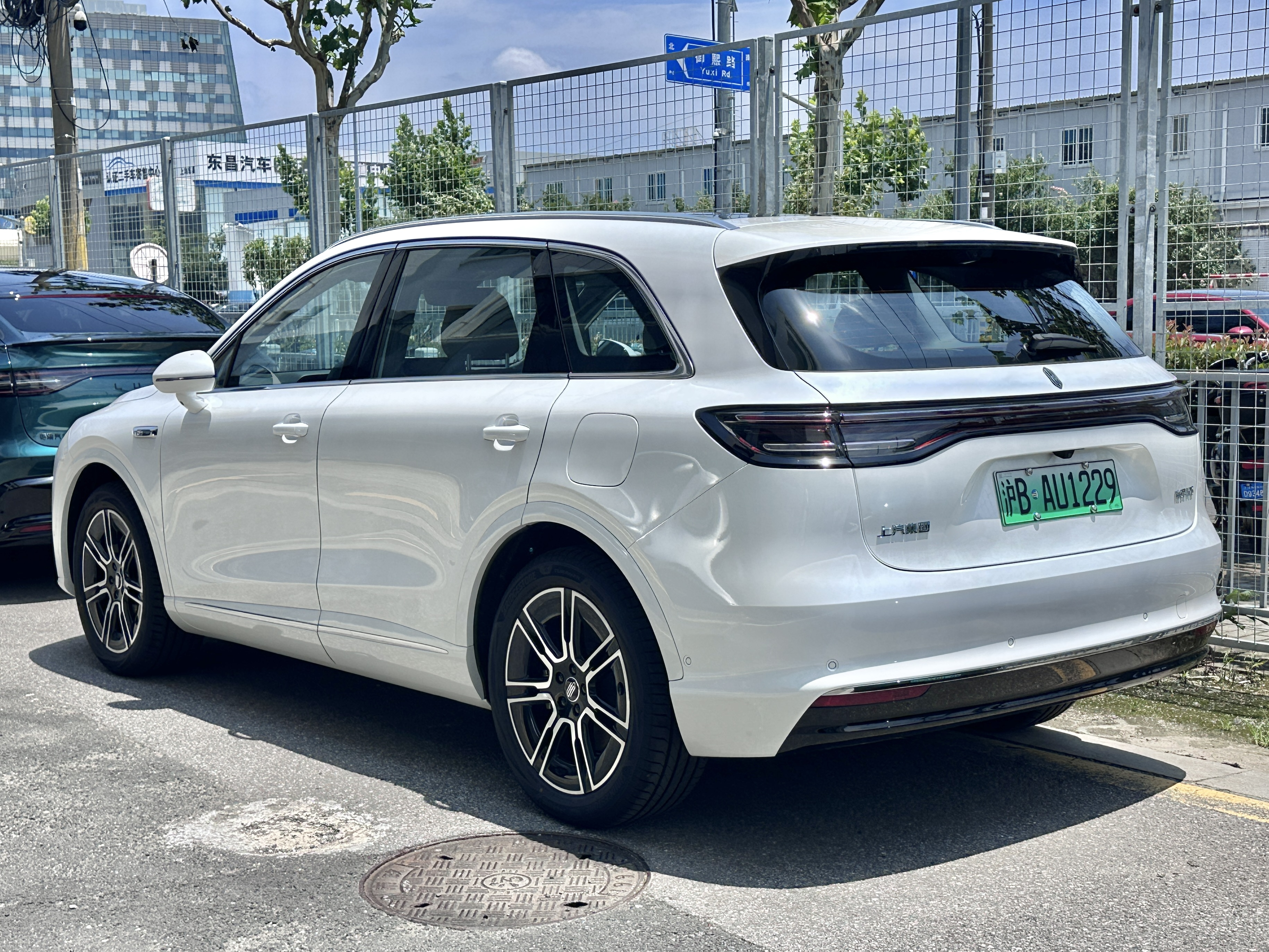
Rear view

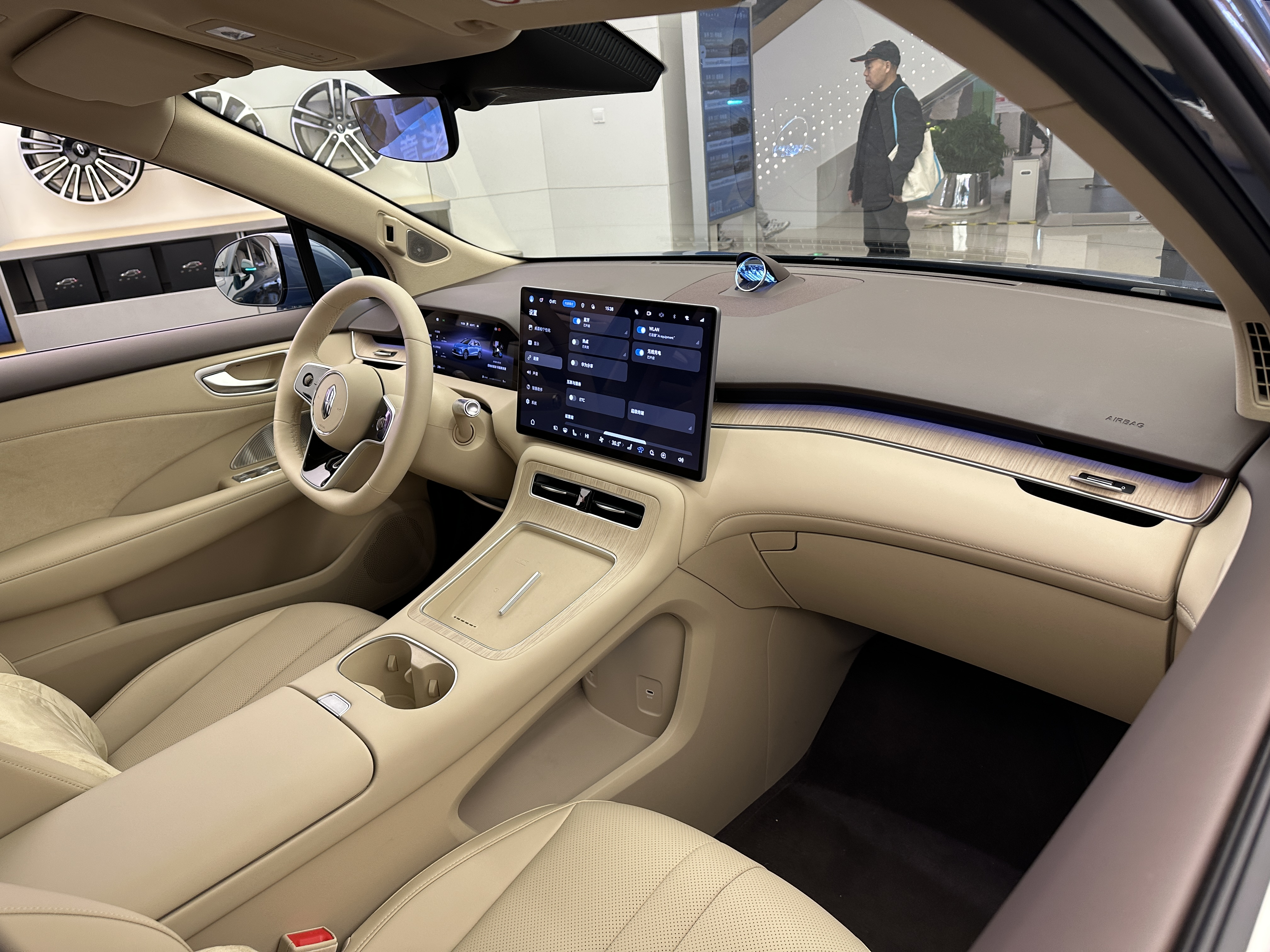
Interior

=== Design and equipment ===
The H5 uses a closed face with a trapezoidal lower air intake and slender headlights. A light bar is also present in the back as well as chrome window frame trim. Unlike most electric cars that were electronic semi-hidden or hidden handles or any other HIMA models, the H5 uses a conventional and mechanical door handles.

A 192-wire LiDAR is featured as standard on the H5. Huawei's Qiankun ADS 4 ADAS system is also expected to be featured. In the interior Huawei's Harmony cockpit with multi-screen interaction and AI voice assistant also come standard.

One of the H5's interior colors is a shade of beige dubbed Beautiful Apricot and features a 3-spoke steering wheel, a column mounted shifter, very few physical buttons, and a charging pad and two cupholders on the center console. The front seats have a Huawei Link connection point for phones and tablets and are also covered in perforated leather. The H5 has a large panoramic moonroof with an automatic sunshade.

== Powertrain ==
The H5 is only available in rear-wheel-drive. Lower models receive a 200 horsepower motor, which is also the only motor available with the EREV model. Higher EV models receive a 240 horsepower motor. The EV models have a range of up to 655 kilometers while the EREV model will have a 1300 kilometer range. It uses LFP batteries supplied by CATL. EREV models use a 1.5-litre naturally aspirated inline 4 gasoline engine codenamed 15FMC producing 97 horsepower as a generator.

The electric range of the EREV version was originally 230 kilometers. The figure was changed to 235 kilometers at launch.

== Sales ==
Year	China		
Year	EV	EREV	Total
2025	10,862	15,268	26,130
