= Chen Zhixin =

President of SAIC Motor

Chen Zhixin is the president of SAIC Motor, the largest car maker in China. Chen has been president of SAIC Motor since June 2014. He previously was vice president, where he led the passenger car unit.
