= SAIC Motor UK =

European subsidiary of Chinese automaker

SAIC Motor UK Technical Centre Limited
- Type: Subsidiary
- Industry: Automotive
- Predecessor: MG Rover Group
- Founded: 2006
- Headquarters: Marylebone, London, England
- Products: Automobile engineering
- Operating income: £2.3m
- Number of employees: 16 (2020)
- Parent: SAIC Motor
- Website: SAIC Motor UK

SAIC Motor Technical Centre (also known as SMTC UK) is the European subsidiary of the Chinese automaker SAIC Motor via SAIC Motor UK Holdings. SAIC Motor also controls MG Motor UK for sales and distribution, but is independent of the technical subsidiary.

== History ==
SAIC Motor UK formed when SAIC Motor bought out MG Motor from Nanjing Automobile in 2006.

SAIC Motor UK Technical Centre is a subsidiary of the SAIC holding company, and evolved from the Ricardo 2010 consultancy that was working with SAIC including developing the Roewe models and helping production of the Rover KV6 engine in China. In 2007 it formally transferred into SMTC.

In 2019 there were large scale redundancies to the technical teams as SAIC downsized the SMTC in Longbridge.

== Brands under SAIC UK ==
- MG
- Morris
- Austin
- Wolseley

== Operations ==
=== Research and development ===
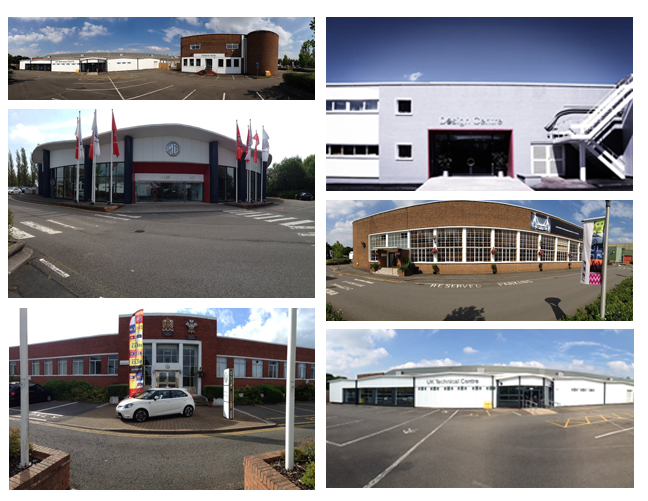
MG Motor UK HQ - SAIC UK Technical & Design Centre

SAIC Motor UK was the major developer of MG and Roewe cars for SAIC. Its best known developed car is the MG 6.
