= SAIC Motor =

Chinese automotive manufacturing company

SAIC Motor Corporation Limited

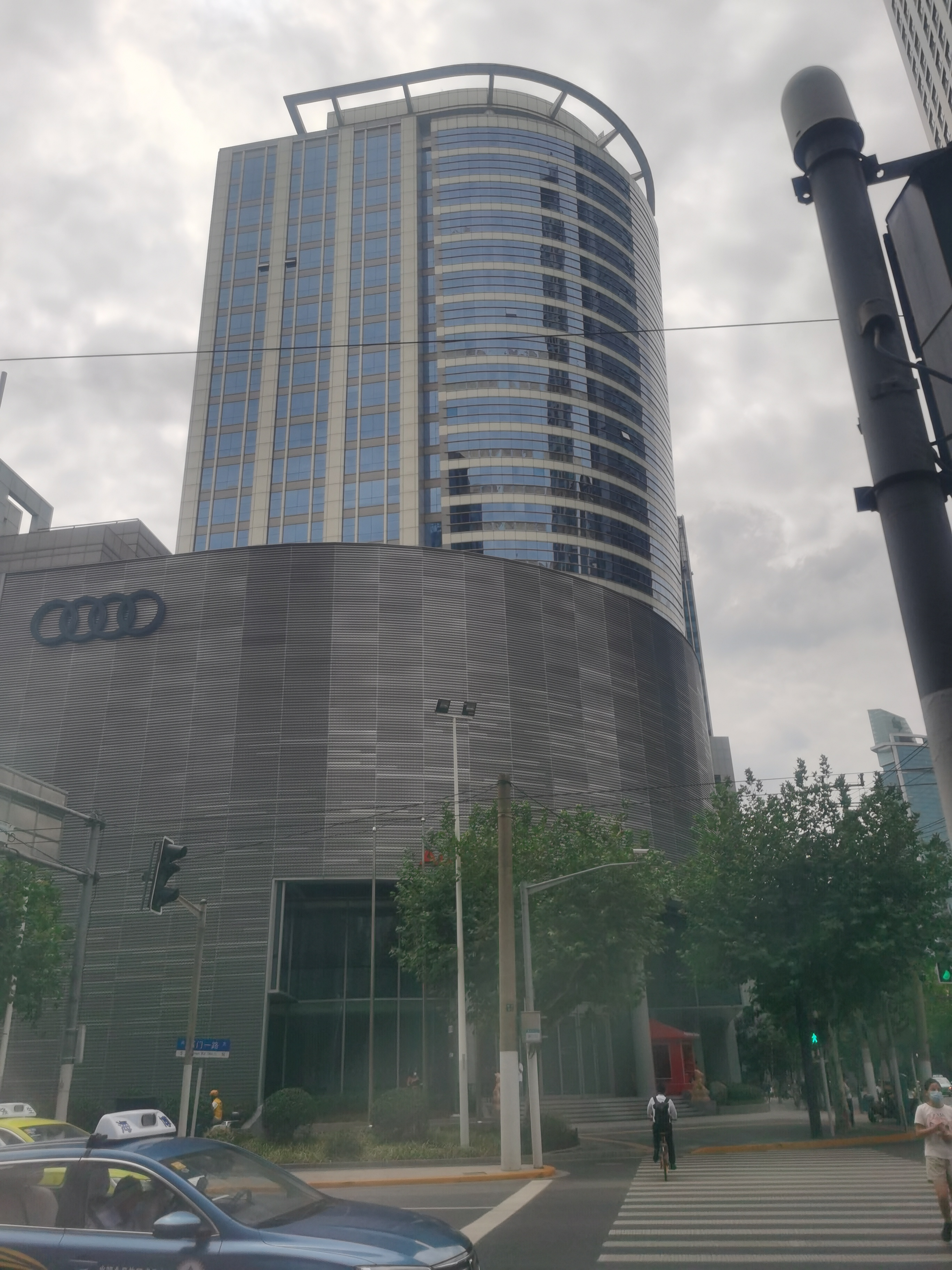
- SAIC Building, which is the administration headquarters, Jing'an District
- Native name: 上海汽车集团股份有限公司
- Formerly: Shanghai Automotive Industry Corporation
- Type: State-owned
- Traded as: SSE: 600104
- Industry: Automotive
- Founded: 1955; 71 years ago as Shanghai Internal Combustion Engine Components Company; 1995; 31 years ago as Shanghai Automotive Industry Corp. (Group)
- Headquarters: Anting, Shanghai, China
- Area served: Worldwide
- Key people: Wang Xiaoqiu; (chairman of the Board of Directors); Shen Xiaosu; (chairman of the board of supervisors); Jia Jianxu; (president)
- Products: Automobiles
- Production output: ▲4,507,500 vehicles (2025)
- Revenue: ▼CN¥ 505.06 billion (2022)
- Operating income: ▼CN¥ 744,062,883,284 (2022)
- Net income: ▼CN¥ 16,117,549,650 (2022)
- Total assets: CN¥ 990,107,381,169 (2022)
- Number of employees: 215,999 (2022)
- Parent: Shanghai State-owned Assets Supervision and Administration Commission (62.69%)
- Divisions: MG Motor; Roewe; IM Motors
- Subsidiaries: List: SAIC Passenger Vehicle; SAIC Maxus; Nanjing Automobile; IM Motors (54%); Nanjing Iveco (30.1%); SAIC Hongyan; Sunwin; SAIC-GM-Wuling (50.1%); Wuling; Baojun; SAIC Volkswagen (50%); SAIC-GM (50%); SAIC Motor UK; SGMW Indonesia (74.92%); SAIC Motor-CP Thailand (51%); JSW MG Motor India (49%); Hong Kong Tramways (50%)

Chinese name
- Simplified Chinese: 上海汽车集团股份有限公司
- Traditional Chinese: 上海汽車集團股份有限公司
- Literal meaning: Shanghai Automotive Group Joint-stock Limited Corporation
Transcriptions
Standard Mandarin
- Hanyu Pinyin: Shànghǎi Qìchē Jítuán Gǔfèn Yǒuxiàn Gōngsī
Yue: Cantonese
- Jyutping: soeng6hoi2 hei3ce1 zaap6tyun4 gu2fan2 jau5haan6 gung1si1

Abbreviation
- Simplified Chinese: 上汽集团
- Traditional Chinese: 上汽集團
Transcriptions
Standard Mandarin
- Hanyu Pinyin: Shàngqì Jítuán
Yue: Cantonese
- Jyutping: soeng6hei3 zaap6tyun4
- Website: saicmotor.com

SAIC Motor Corp., Ltd. (formerly Shanghai Automotive Industry Corporation) is a Chinese state-owned automobile manufacturer headquartered in Anting, Shanghai. Founded in 1955, it is currently the largest of the "Big Four" state-owned car manufacturers of China ahead of FAW Group, Dongfeng Motor Corporation, and Changan Automobile, with sales exceeding 4.5 million vehicles in 2025.

The company traces its origins to the early years of the Chinese automobile industry in the 1940s, and SAIC was one of the few carmakers in Maoist China, making the Shanghai SH760. Currently, it participates in the oldest surviving sino-foreign automotive joint venture with Volkswagen (SAIC-Volkswagen) since 1984, and in addition operates a joint venture with General Motors (SAIC-GM) since 1998. It also produces and sells passenger vehicles under its own branding, such as IM Motors, Roewe, MG, Rising Auto and Maxus/LDV. It is also the largest shareholder of SAIC-GM-Wuling (SGMW), a joint venture selling Wuling and Baojun branded vehicles. In 2021, SAIC self-owned brands contributes 52% of SAIC's sales.

The company ranked 84th on the Fortune Global 500 list in 2023. Including SGMW, it was also the third-largest plug-in electric vehicle (battery electric and plug-in hybrid) company and second-largest battery electric vehicle manufacturer in the world, with 10.5% and 13% global market share respectively in 2021.

== History ==
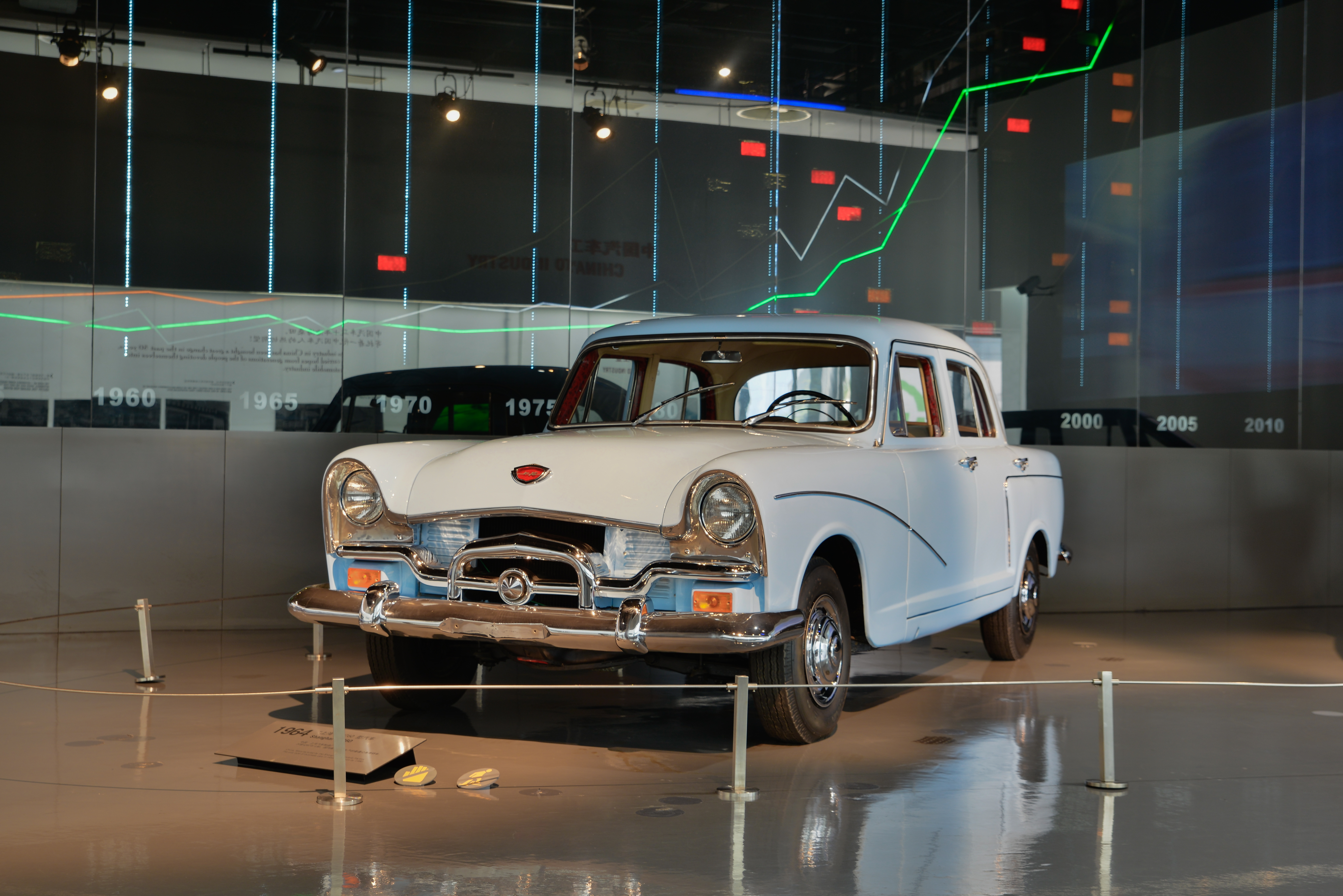
A 1964 Shanghai SH760, Shanghai's automotive mainstay for over 25 years

=== Origins to 2000 ===
Although it has a long history, originating from an automobile assembly factory established in Shanghai sometime around World War II, SAIC, unlike domestic rivals FAW Group and Dongfeng Motors, has only recently attained a position of prominence in the Chinese vehicle industry. A small company in the 1970s, SAIC owes its rise to more than an increase in domestic demand for passenger vehicles. A cooperative agreement made with Volkswagen in 1984 followed by the formal establishment of Shanghai Volkswagen Automotive Co. Ltd. in March 1985 allowed it to produce competitive cars with foreign technology. Early success at SAIC were a result of guidance provided by local Shanghai authorities; at one time SAIC was simply an extension of the Shanghai Municipal government. For these two reasons and more, SAIC grew swiftly. In the 11 years leading to 1996, annual production capacity increased ten-fold to 300,000 units/year, and the company established itself as one of the leading Chinese automakers.

During this period, SAIC effectively built an entire modern automotive component supply chain in Shanghai from scratch, and the number and quality of locally produced auto parts rose significantly. Cars that were previously assembled in China from knock-down kits provisioned by Volkswagen became products built from parts produced in Shanghai, and between 1990 and 1996 the city more than doubled its contribution to the national output of automotive components. In 1987, the only local parts used in one car, the Volkswagen Santana, were tires, radio, and antenna, but by 1998 over 90% of the components used in its manufacture were locally sourced. A goal set by the Shanghai Municipal government, creation of a local parts industry is an example of the influence that the local government has had on the development of SAIC.

In June 1997, SAIC formed a second major joint venture, Shanghai General Motors Co Ltd, with General Motors. The new joint venture began operations in 1998, and helped to drive a doubling in SAIC's vehicle production between 2000 and 2004. SAIC also created joint ventures with component suppliers, such as the American Visteon.

=== 2000 to 2010 ===
At the start of the 2000s, SAIC made several acquisitions in Korea. In 2002 it participated in GM's purchase of Korean automaker Daewoo, acquiring a 10% stake in the newly formed GM Daewoo company for US$59.7 million, and in 2004 it also assumed control of an ailing South Korean automaker, SsangYong Motor, paying US$500 million for 48.9% ownership of the company. Around this time SAIC created a new holding company for its subsidiaries employed in passenger car production, Shanghai Automotive Group.

In the middle of the decade, SAIC attempted to acquire the British automaker MG Rover, but in 2005 was outbid by another Chinese automaker, Nanjing Automobile. SAIC did manage to obtain some MG Rover technology that was incorporated into a new line of luxury sedans sold under the Roewe marque, and it subsequently purchased the winning bidder.

While the company saw sales success in the late 2000s, with 2.72 million vehicles sold in 2009, its 2004 purchase of an ownership stake in a Korean SUV-maker, Ssangyong, soured. In January 2009, after an additional US$45 million was provided to it by SAIC, SsangYong Motor Company was placed into receivership in Korea. Courts might have mandated SAIC reduce its ownership, and by 2010 a 51.33% share of the Korean company had become a 10% one. The 2009 Ssangyong failure also saw riot police quell protesting Ssangyong workers who staged a 77-day-long sit in.

=== 2010 to present ===
In 2010, SAIC produced 3.58 million units, the largest output of any China-based automaker that year.

In June 2010, Mneti Marelli and Shanghai Automobile Gear Works (SAGW) officially launched a new joint venture plant in the Jiading district near Shanghai, China. SAGW, the main Chinese manufacturer of transmissions for the automotive sector, is a subsidiary of SAIC Motor.

In February 2011, SAIC unveiled a new commercial vehicles marque, Maxus.

In 2011, SAIC produced 3.97 million vehicles, the largest output of any China-based automaker that year.

In 2012, SAIC retained its top spot among domestic rivals by producing around 3.5 million units.

In 2023, SAIC received the equivalent of US$560 million in state subsidies. In July 2023, Audi and SAIC Group announced their partnership that the EV platform from IM Motors will be introduced into Audi's electric models.

In September 2023, the European Commission (EC) launched an anti-subsidy investigation into Chinese electric vehicle manufacturers, including SAIC which exported electric vehicles in high volume under the MG brand to the region. In June 2024, the EC completed its investigation and announced new tariffs for Chinese-built electric vehicles (on top of an existing 10 percent tariff for all foreign-made vehicles regardless of engine type), which went into effect on 4 July 2024. Electric vehicles made by SAIC Motor would be subjected to the highest tariff of 38.1 percent. On 26 June, after receiving more information, the EU reduced the proposed tariffs from 38.1 percent to 37.6 percent for SAIC. The tariffs subjected to SAIC vehicles are the highest among Chinese electric vehicle manufacturers that are affected. SAIC released a statement condemning the decision, noting that the tariffs are a form of unfair market discrimination that went against the principles of free trade.

In July 2024, SAIC Motor issued a statement stating that it would formally request the European Commission to hold a hearing on the anti-subsidy investigation. The company claimed that the European Commission's investigation asked SAIC to disclose its commercially sensitive information including battery-related chemical formulas, which SAIC declined as it is beyond the scope of a normal investigation.

In November 2024, SAIC Motor Passenger Vehicle, a subsidiary of SAIC, announced the reintegration of the Rising Auto brand into Roewe, ending its status as an independent brand. Rising Auto will be restructured as a premium electric vehicle product line under the Roewe brand.

In April 2025, SAIC Motor and Huawei jointly unveiled the fifth brand under HIMA, SAIC (dubbed "尚界" in Chinese), during the HIMA new product launch event.

On 28 May 2026, SAIC Motor delivered its 100 million vehicle, the IM LS9 Hyper in Shanghai, becoming the first automotive group in the history of China automotive industry to achieve a cumulative production and sales volume of over 100 million vehicles.

=== Mergers and company name-changes ===
The present-day SAIC is the product of numerous mergers and corporate restructurings.

- In December 1955, Shanghai Internal Combustion Engine Components Company was founded.
- In March 1958, Shanghai Internal Combustion Engine Components Company and Shanghai Powertrain Equipment Manufacturing Company were merged into Shanghai Powertrain Machinery Manufacturing Company.
- In January 1960, Shanghai Powertrain Machinery Manufacturing Company was renamed Shanghai Agricultural Machinery Manufacturing Company.
- In April 1969, Shanghai Agricultural Machinery Manufacturing Company was renamed Shanghai Tractor Industry Company. Shanghai Automobile & Tractor Company was established in July 1984.
- In March 1990, Shanghai Automobile & Tractor Company was renamed Shanghai Automotive Industry Corporation.
- In September 1995, Shanghai Automotive Industry Corp (Group) was founded.
SAIC logos

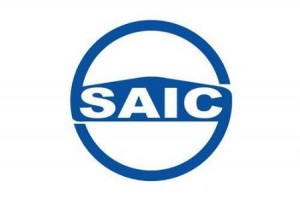
1995–2011

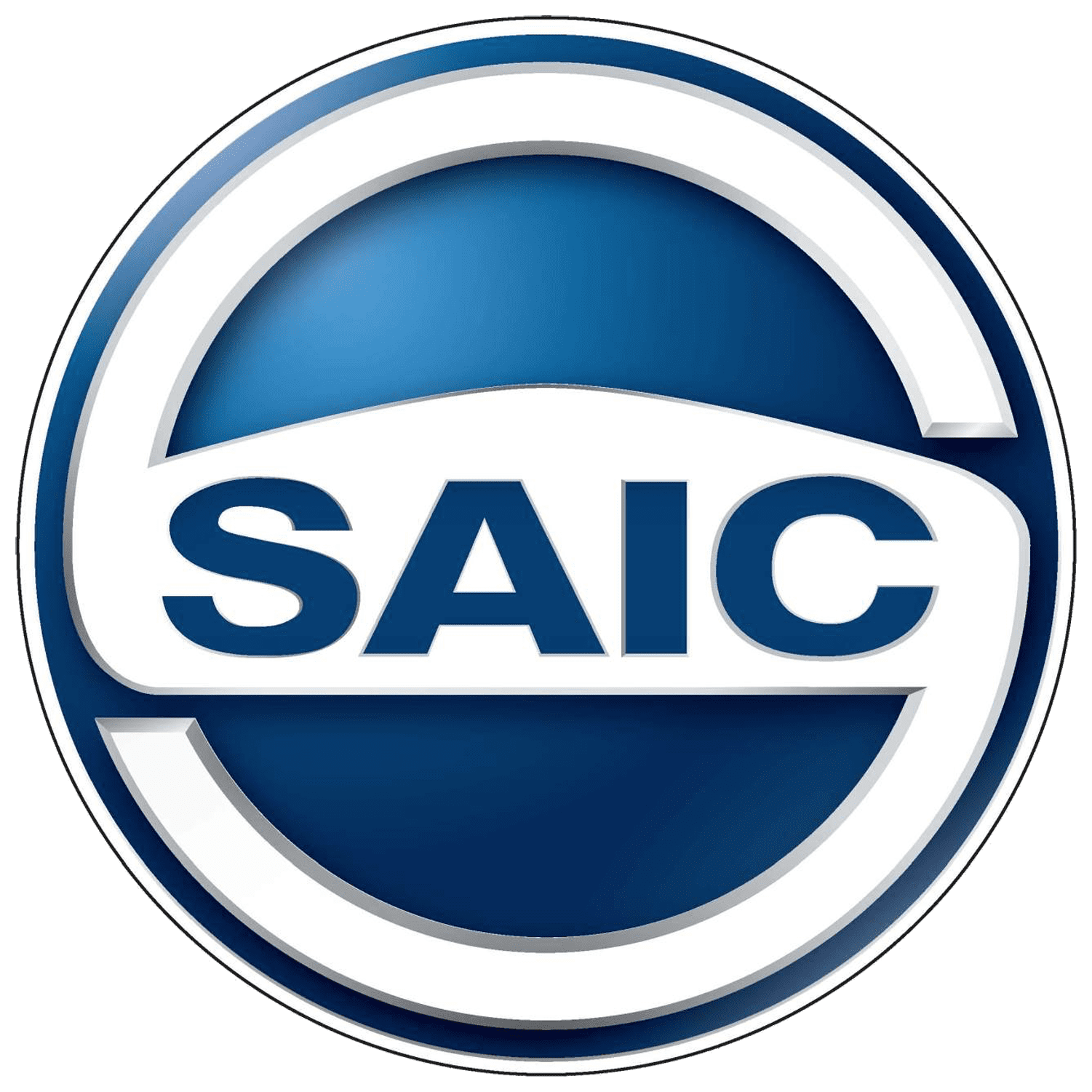
2011–2021

== Corporate Leadership ==
=== Presidents ===
- Chen Hong (2004–2014)
- Chen Zhixin (2014–2019)
- Wang Xiaoqiu (2019–2024)
- Jia Jianxu (2024–present)

=== Chairmen ===
- Hu Maoyuan (2008–2014)
- Chen Hong (2014–2024)
- Wang Xiaoqiu (2024–present)

== Brands ==
SAIC sells vehicles under a variety of brands. Brands that are considered "self-owned" by SAIC include IM, Maxus, MG, Roewe, Baojun, Wuling, Hongyan, and Sunwin.

=== IM ===
IM is a luxury electric vehicle brand launched by SAIC on 13 January 2021. Known as "Zhiji Motor" in Chinese, the brand was jointly developed in partnership with Shanghai's Pudong New Area government and Alibaba. According to SAIC Motor, "IM" stands for "Intelligence in Motion."

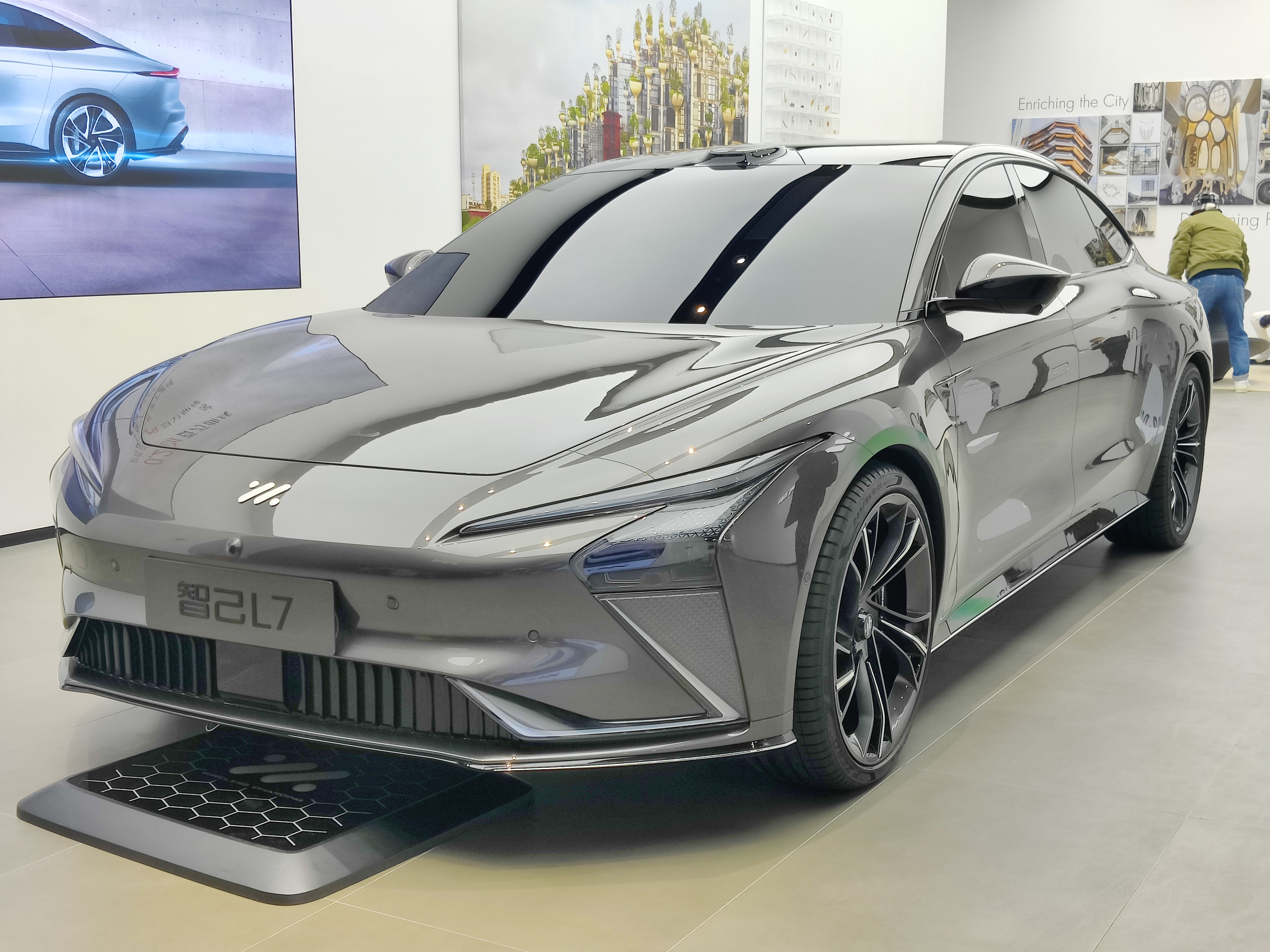
IM L7

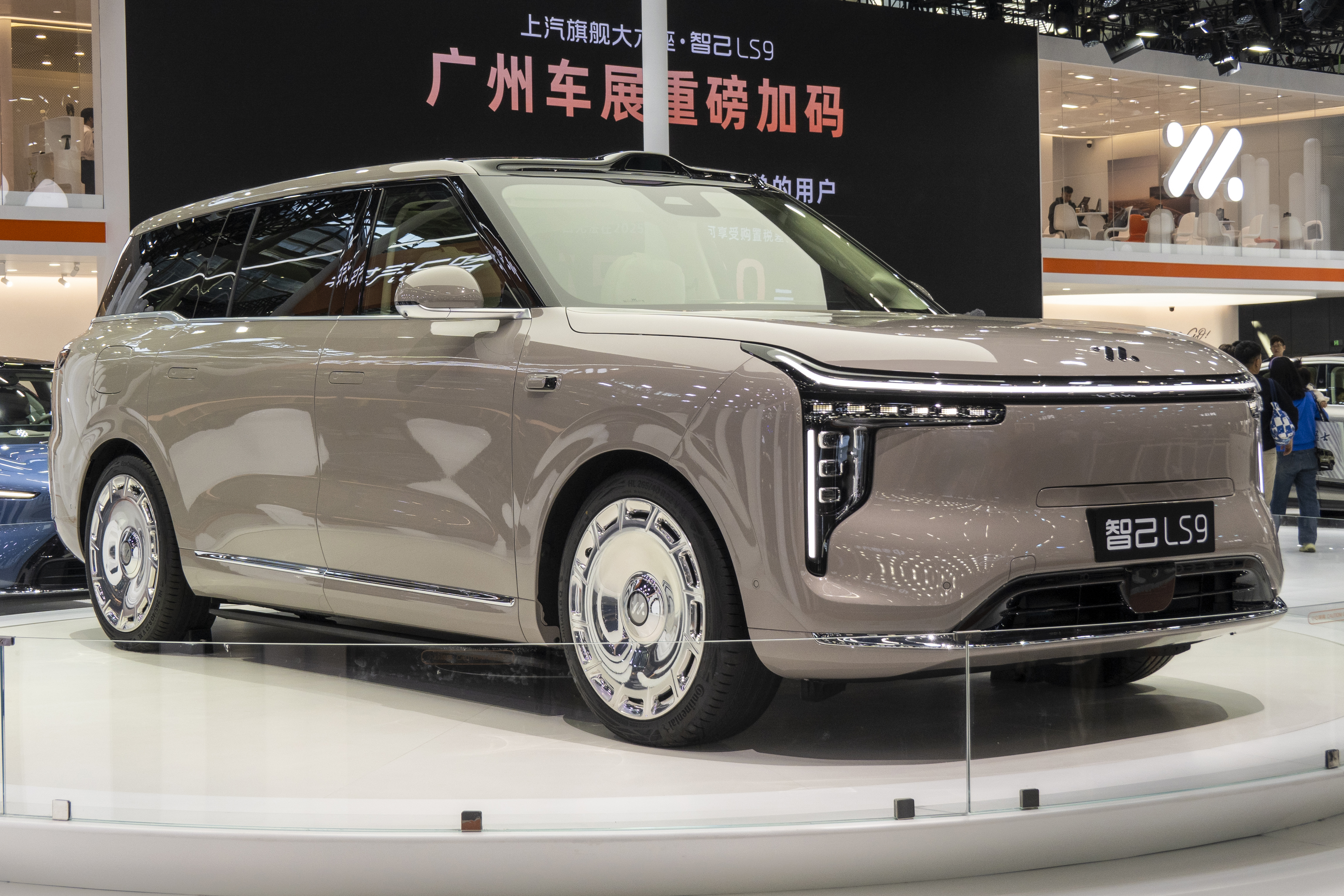
IM LS9

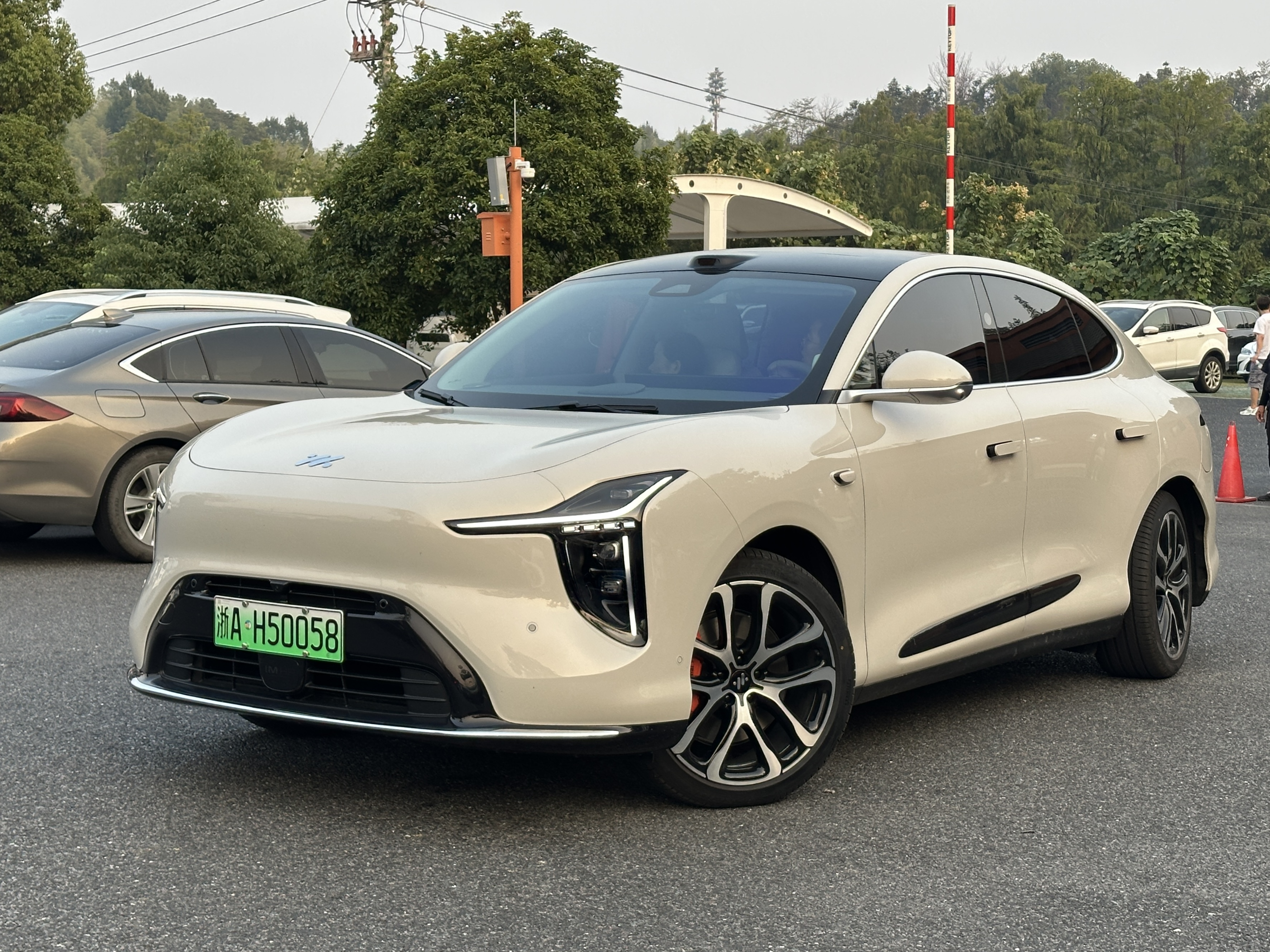
IM LS6

=== MG ===
MG Motor designs, develops and markets cars sold under the MG marque.

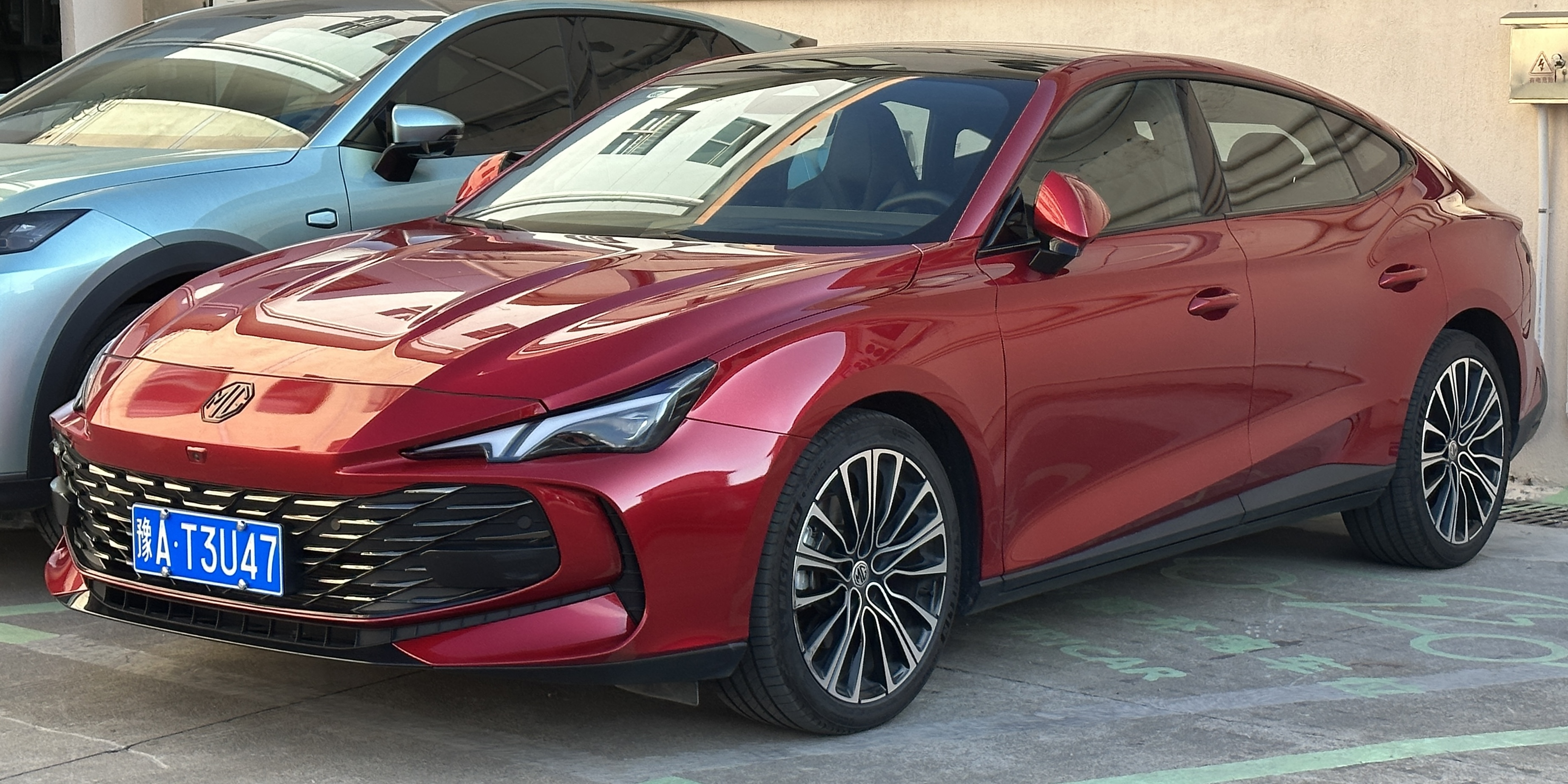
MG 7

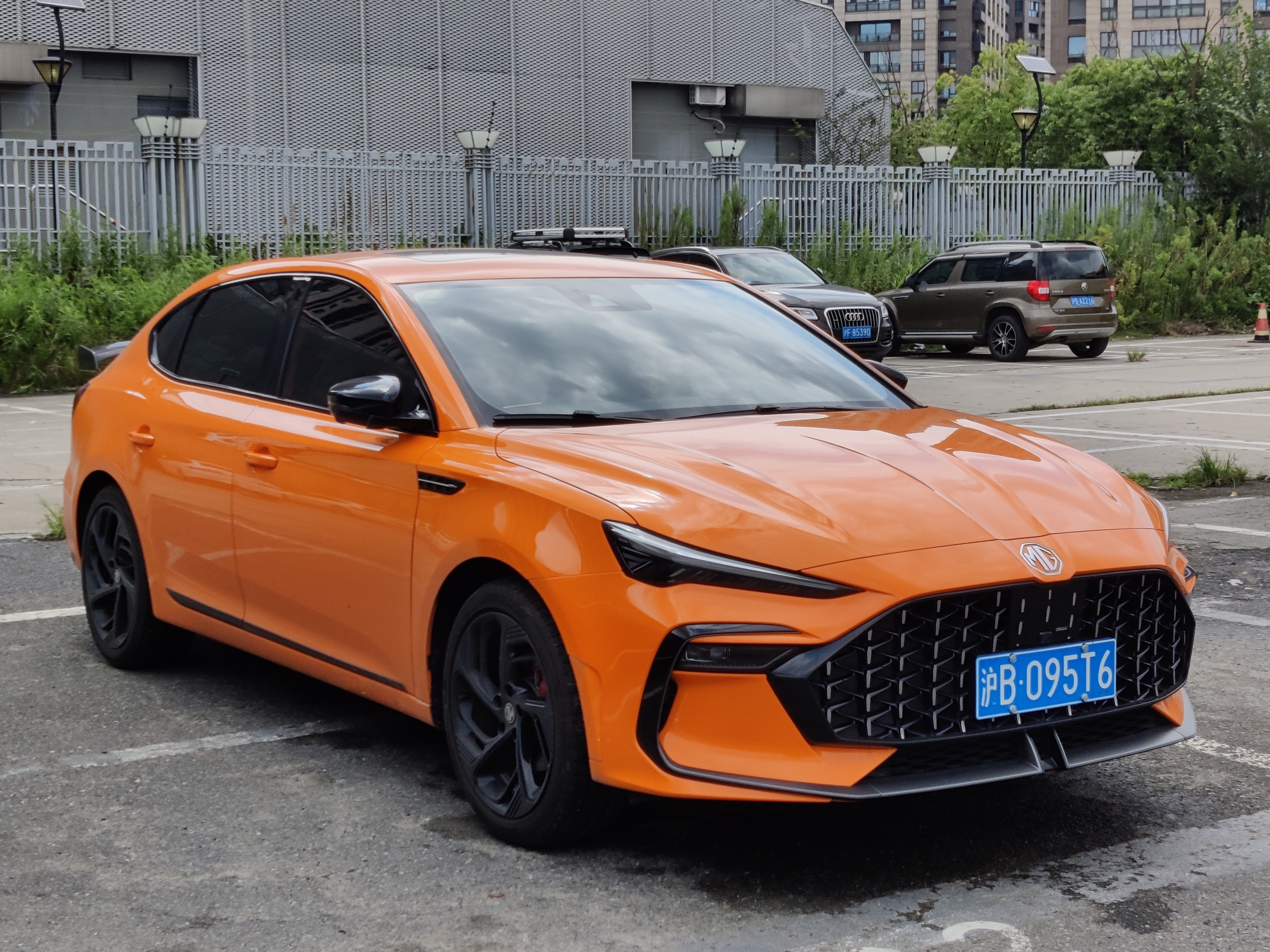
MG 6 II

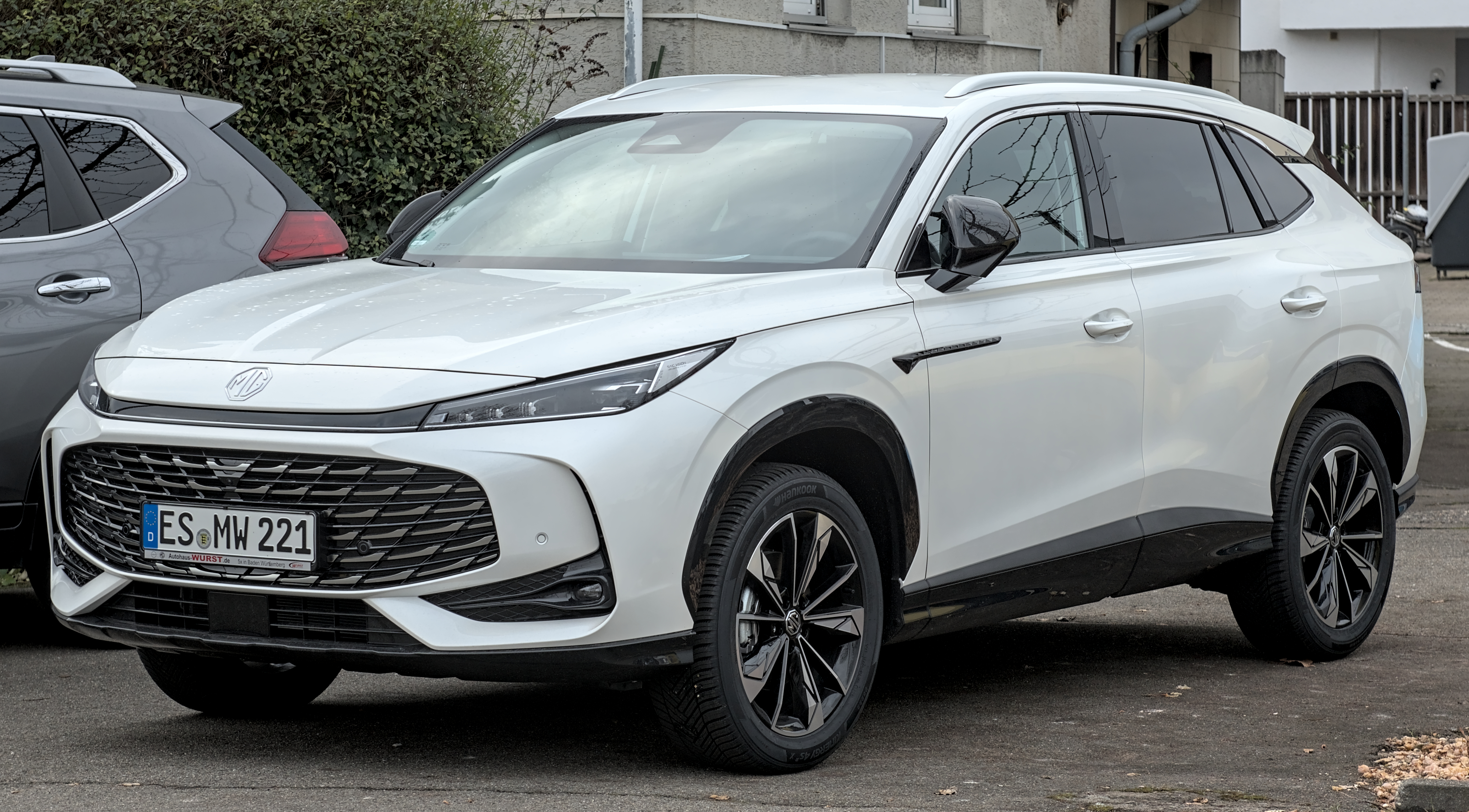
MG HS

=== Roewe ===
Roewe was introduced by SAIC in 2006. It is sold in most export markets outside China under the MG Motor marque.

Rising Auto was initially introduced as the "R Brand" in 2020, a sub-brand of SAIC's Roewe division focused on electric vehicles. It operated as an independent brand beginning in 2021 but was reintegrated into Roewe in 2024. It currently serves as the premium product line under the Roewe brand.

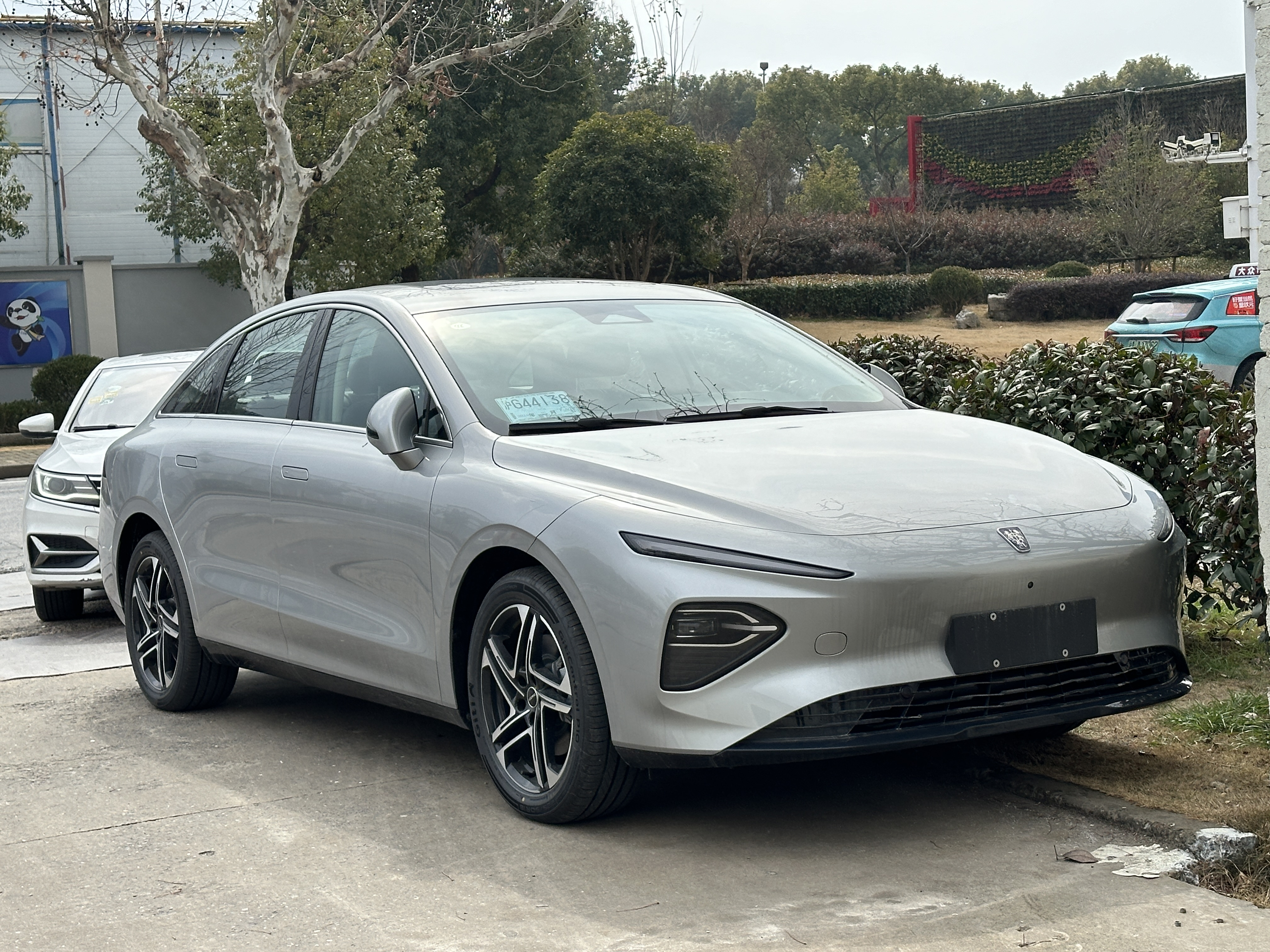
Roewe D7

Roewe Jiayue 07

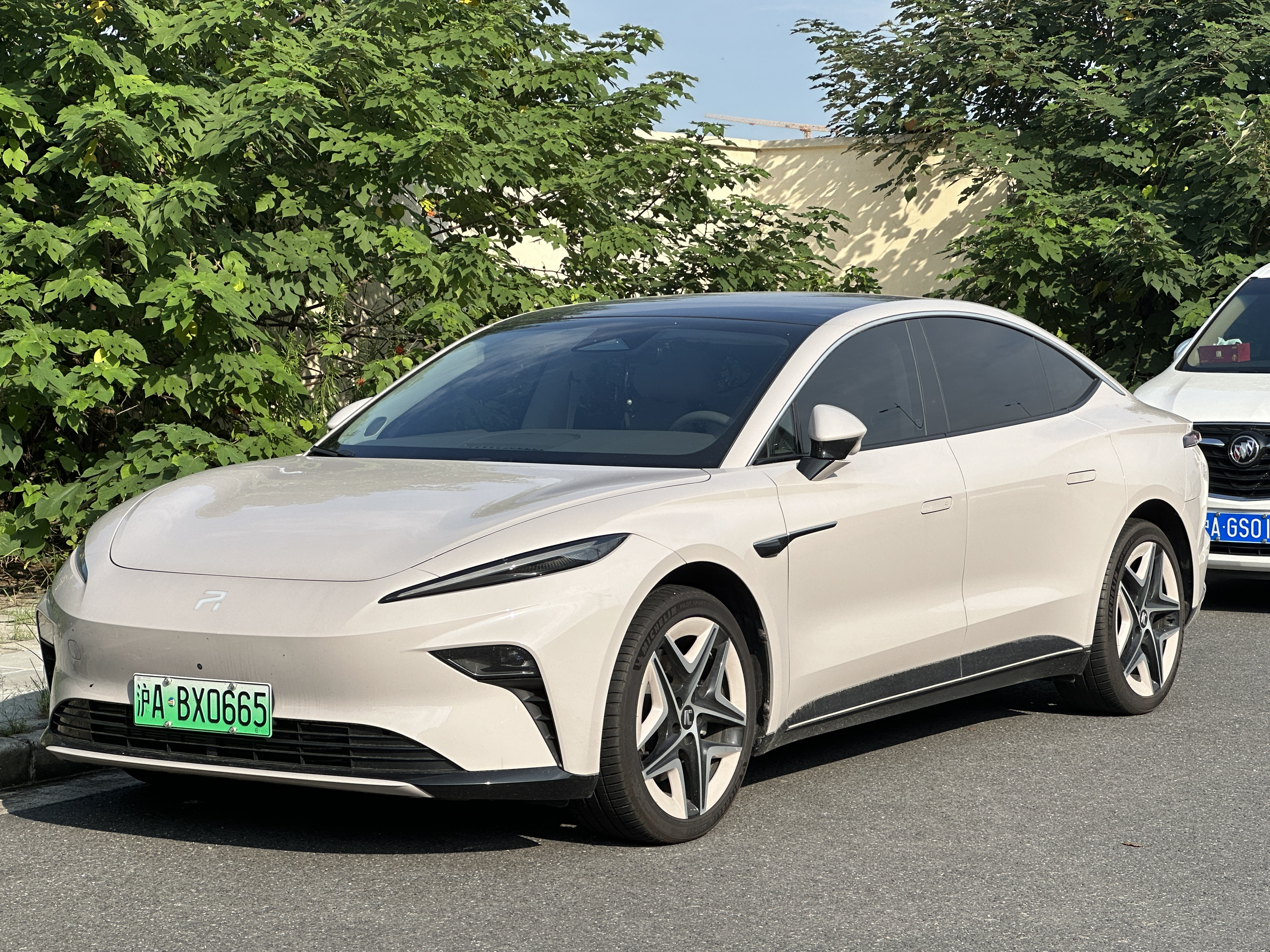
Rising Auto F7

=== SAIC ===
SAIC (Chinese: 尚界; pinyin: Shàngjiè) is the brand used for Huawei's collaboration with SAIC Motor.

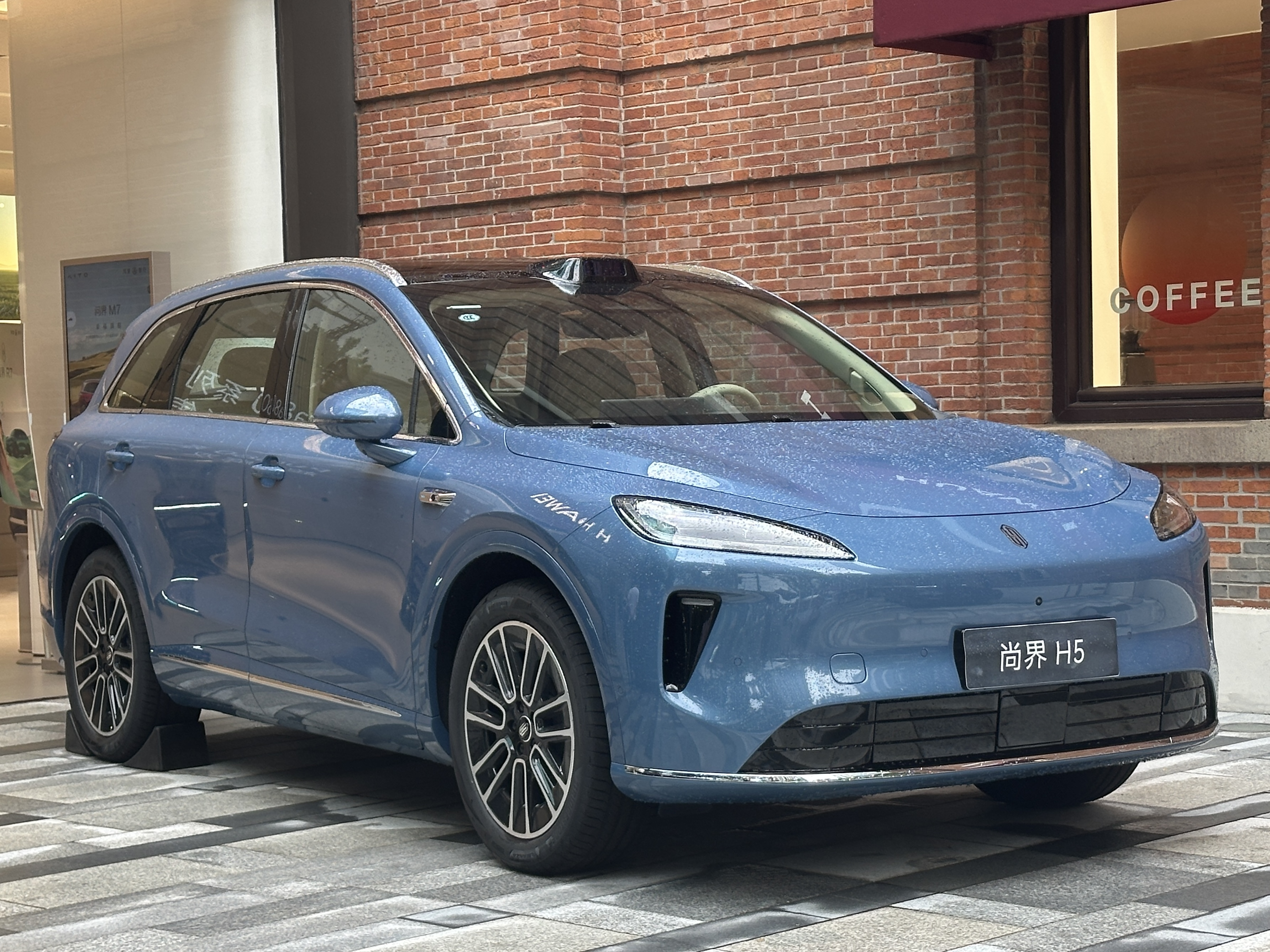
SAIC H5

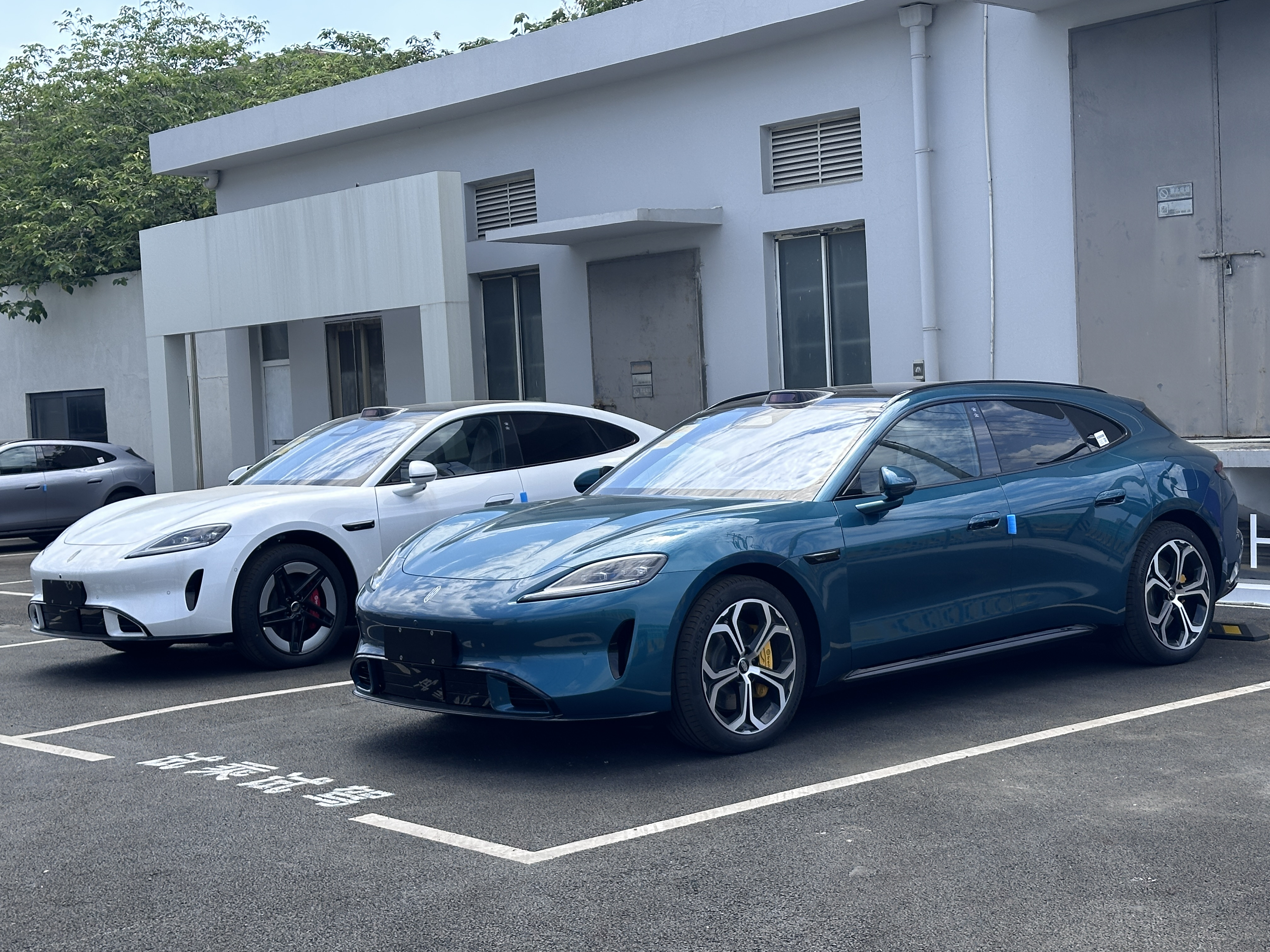
SAIC Z7

=== Maxus ===
Maxus was formed in 2011 following the acquisition of LDV Group by SAIC in 2010, and produces MPVs, pickup trucks, and SUVs for both domestic sale and global export.

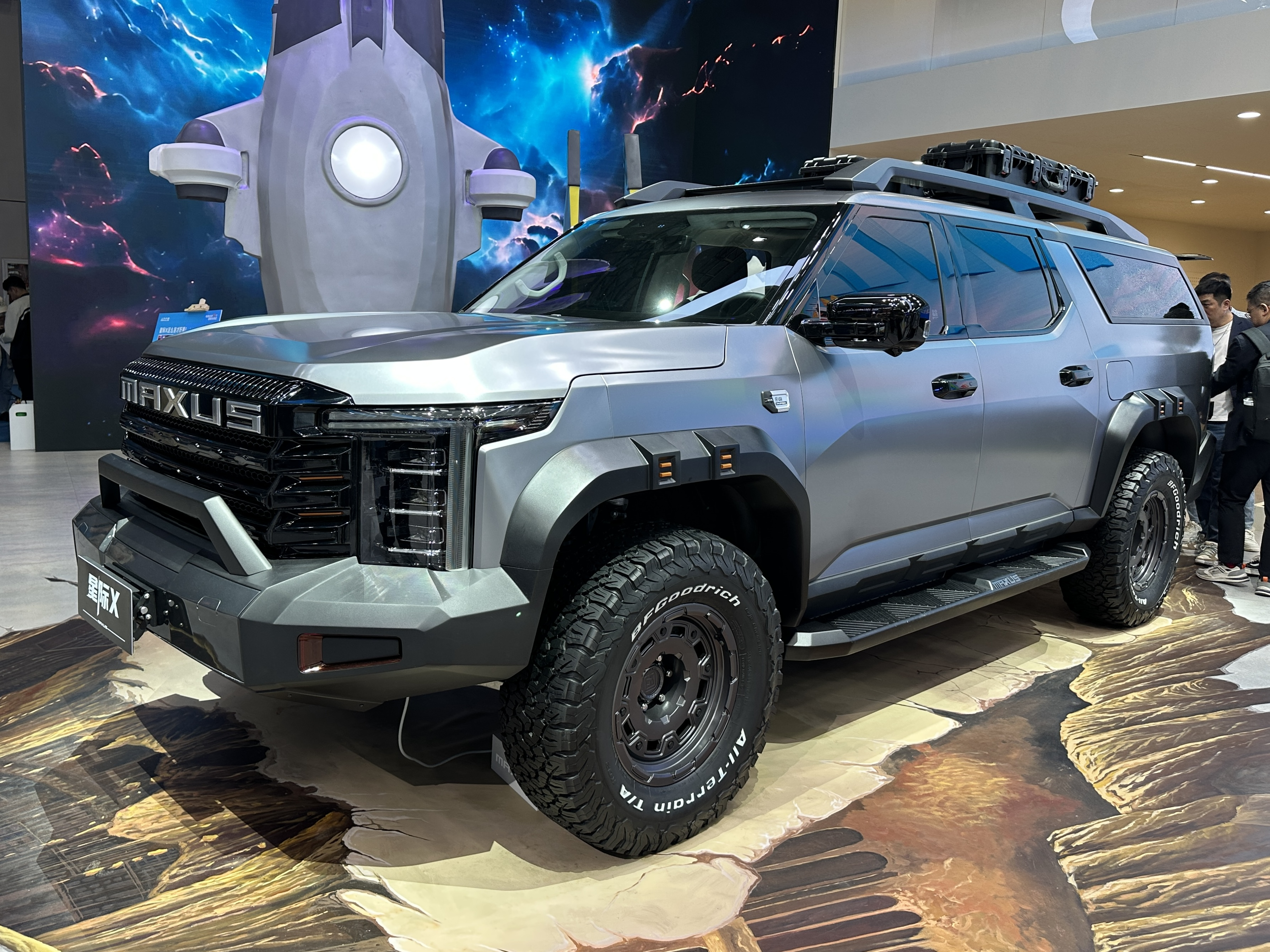
Maxus Interstellar X

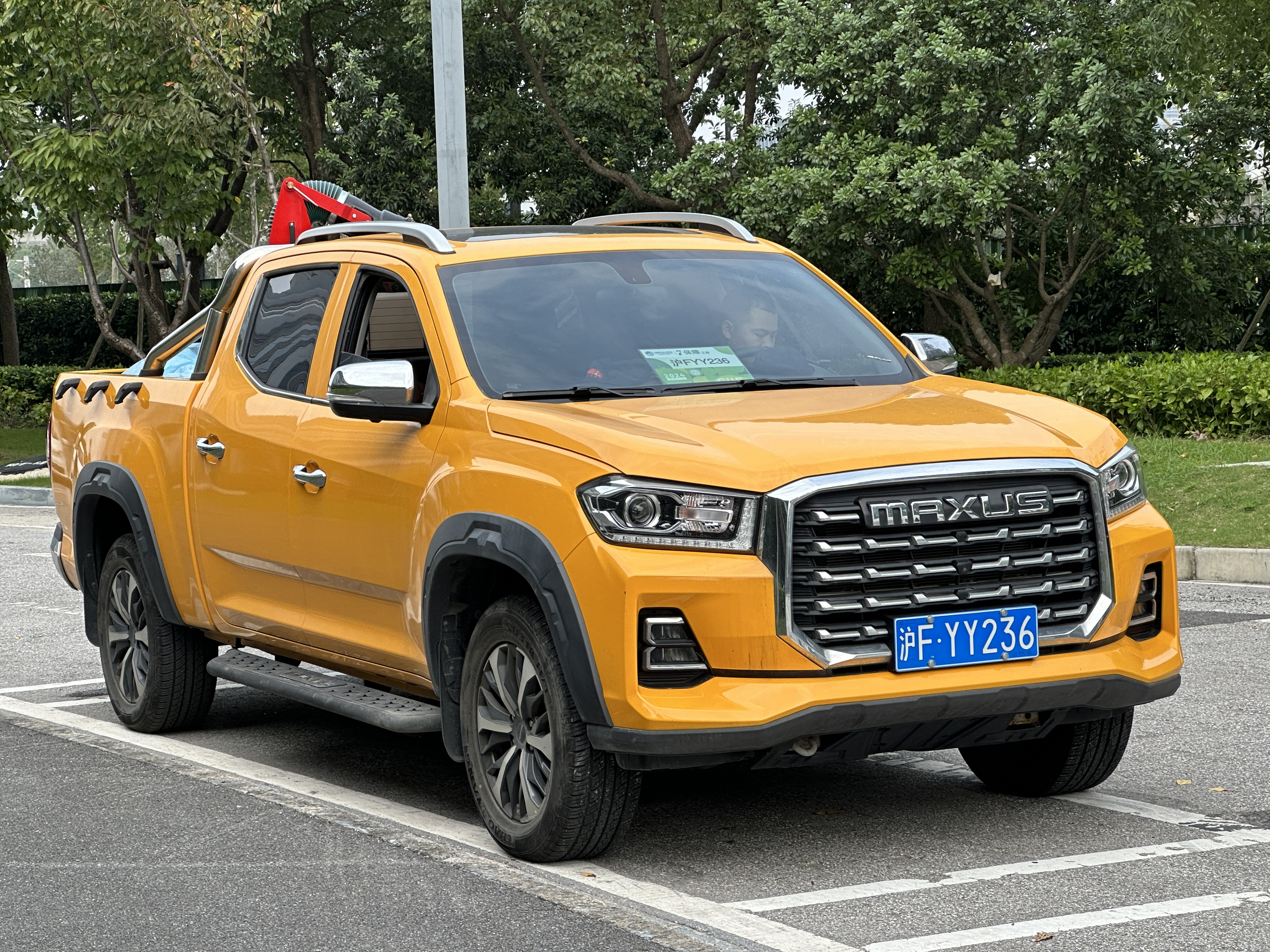
Maxus T70

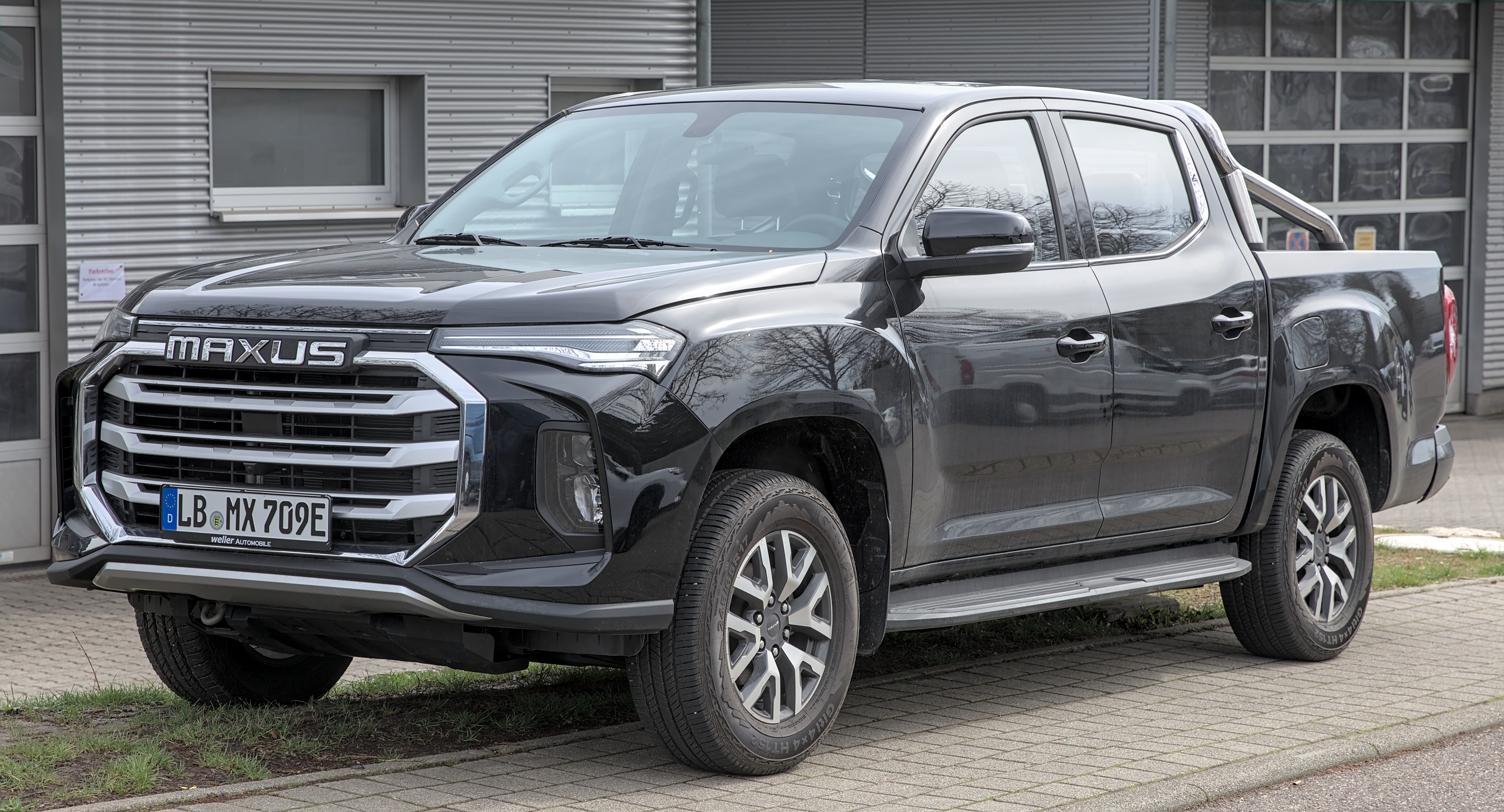
Maxus T90

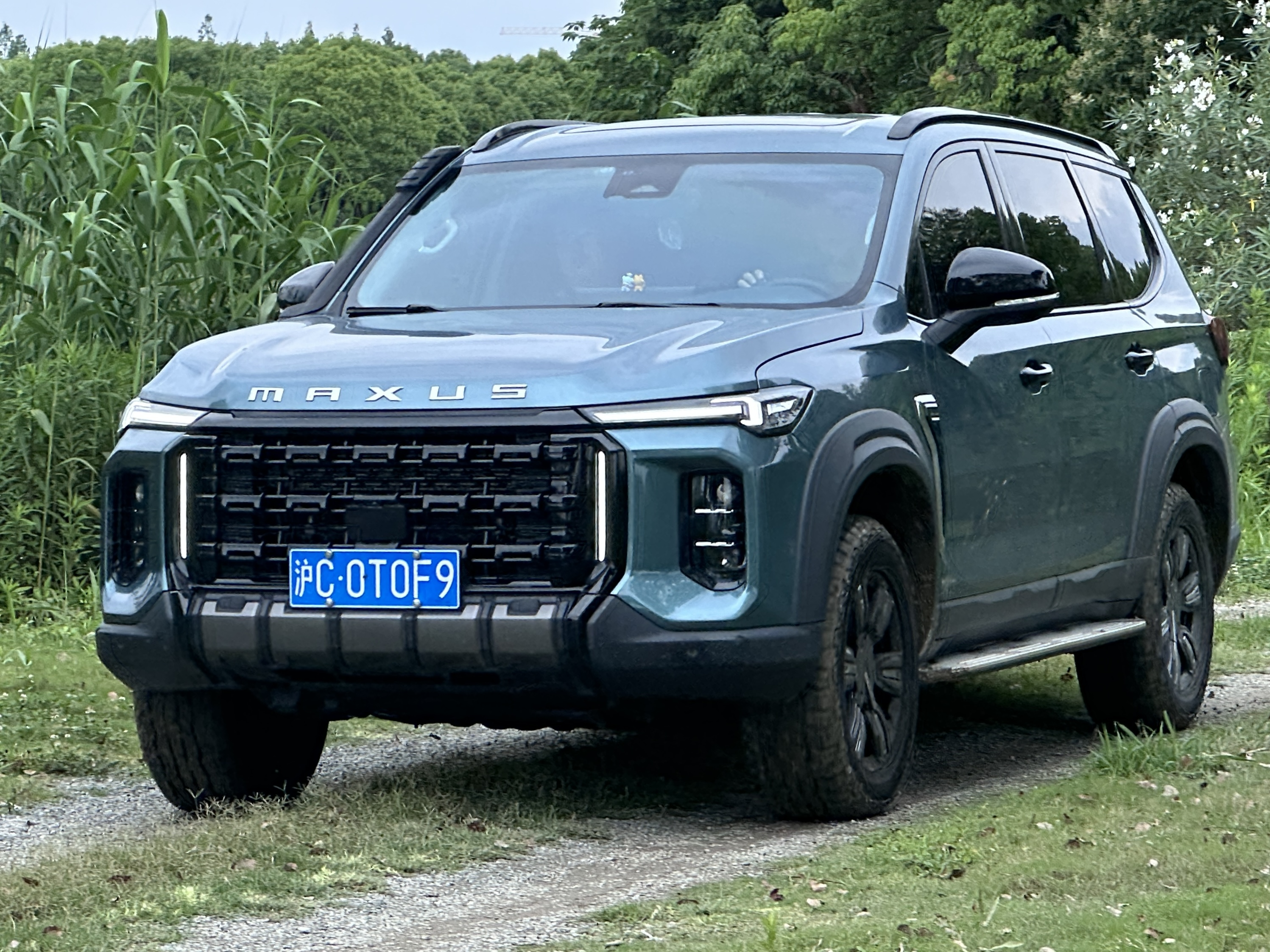
Maxus D90

=== Wuling/Baojun (SAIC-GM-Wuling) ===
SAIC-GM-Wuling (SGMW) is a joint venture between SAIC, General Motors, and Guangxi Automobile Group (formerly Wuling Group). Based in Liuzhou, Guangxi Zhuang Autonomous Region, in southwestern China, the company produces commercial and consumer vehicles marketed under the Wuling and Baojun brands. SGMW has achieved significant success in electric vehicle manufacturing, with its Wuling Hongguang Mini EV city car becoming the best-selling electric vehicle in China by volume in 2021.

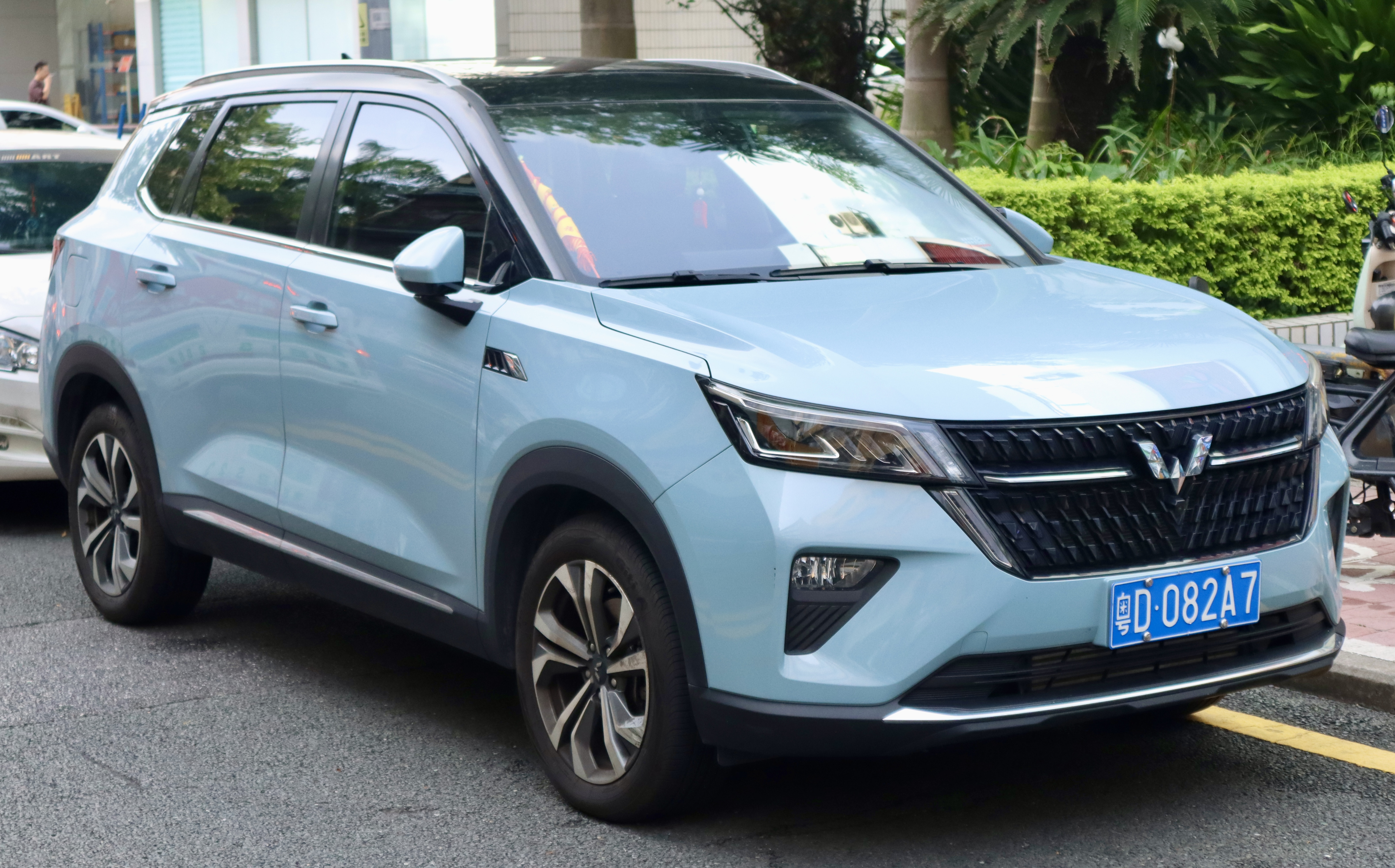
Wuling Asta

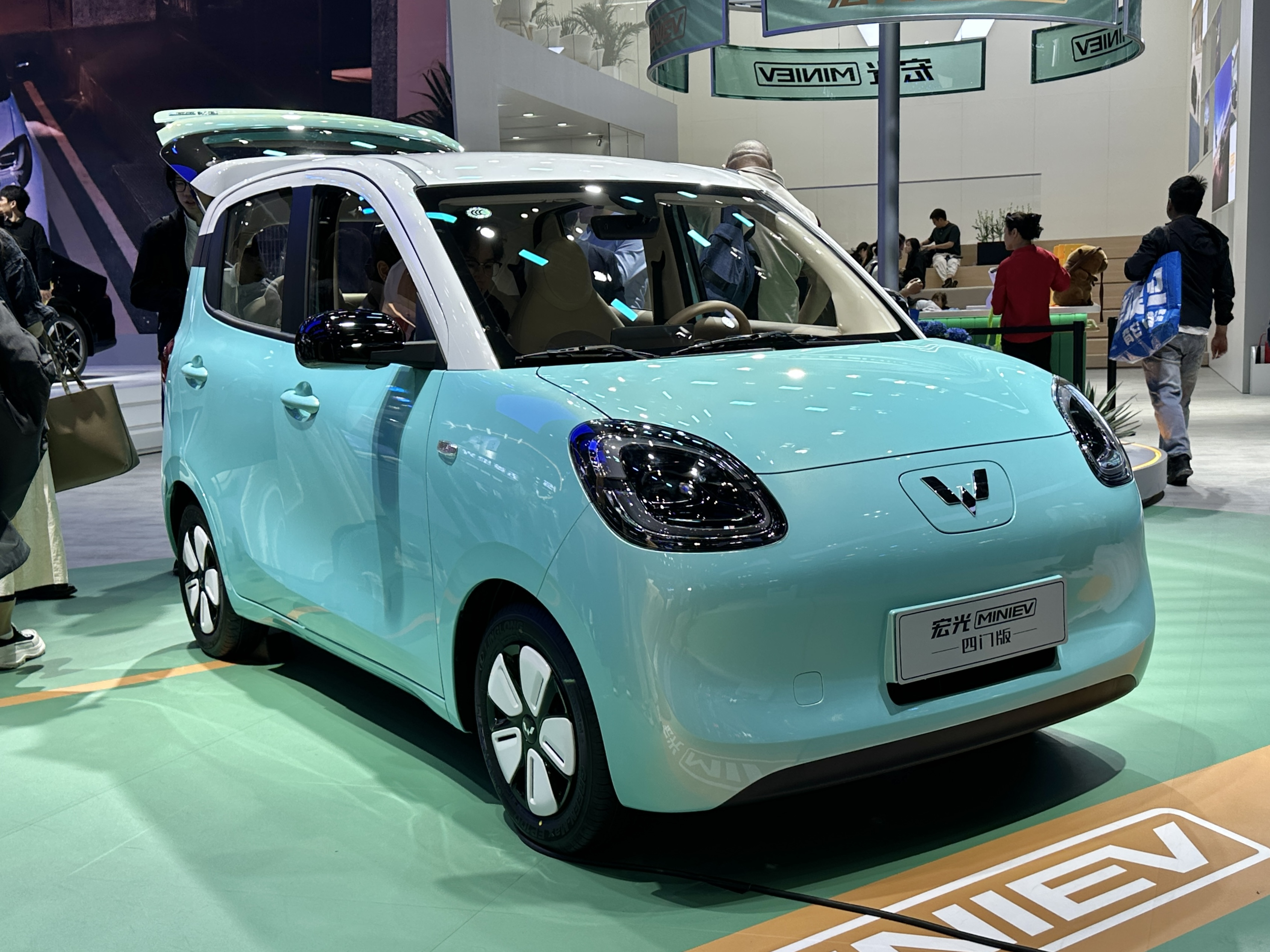
Wuling Hongguang Mini EV

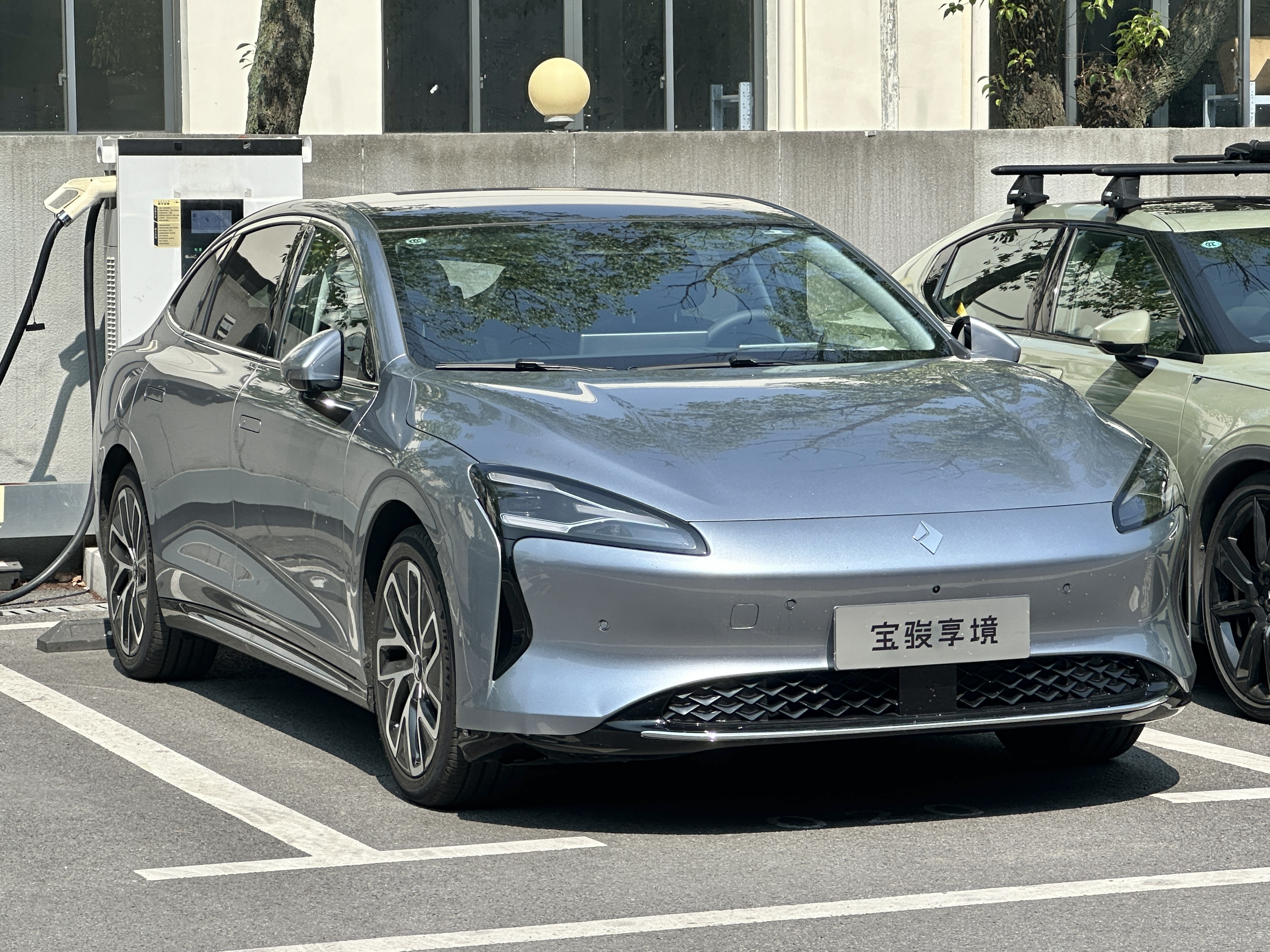
Baojun Xiangjing

=== Hongyan ===
SAIC Hongyan was established in January 2003 as Chongqing Hongyan and traces its origins back to a Chinese manufacturer established in 1965. The company is focused on producing heavy trucks.

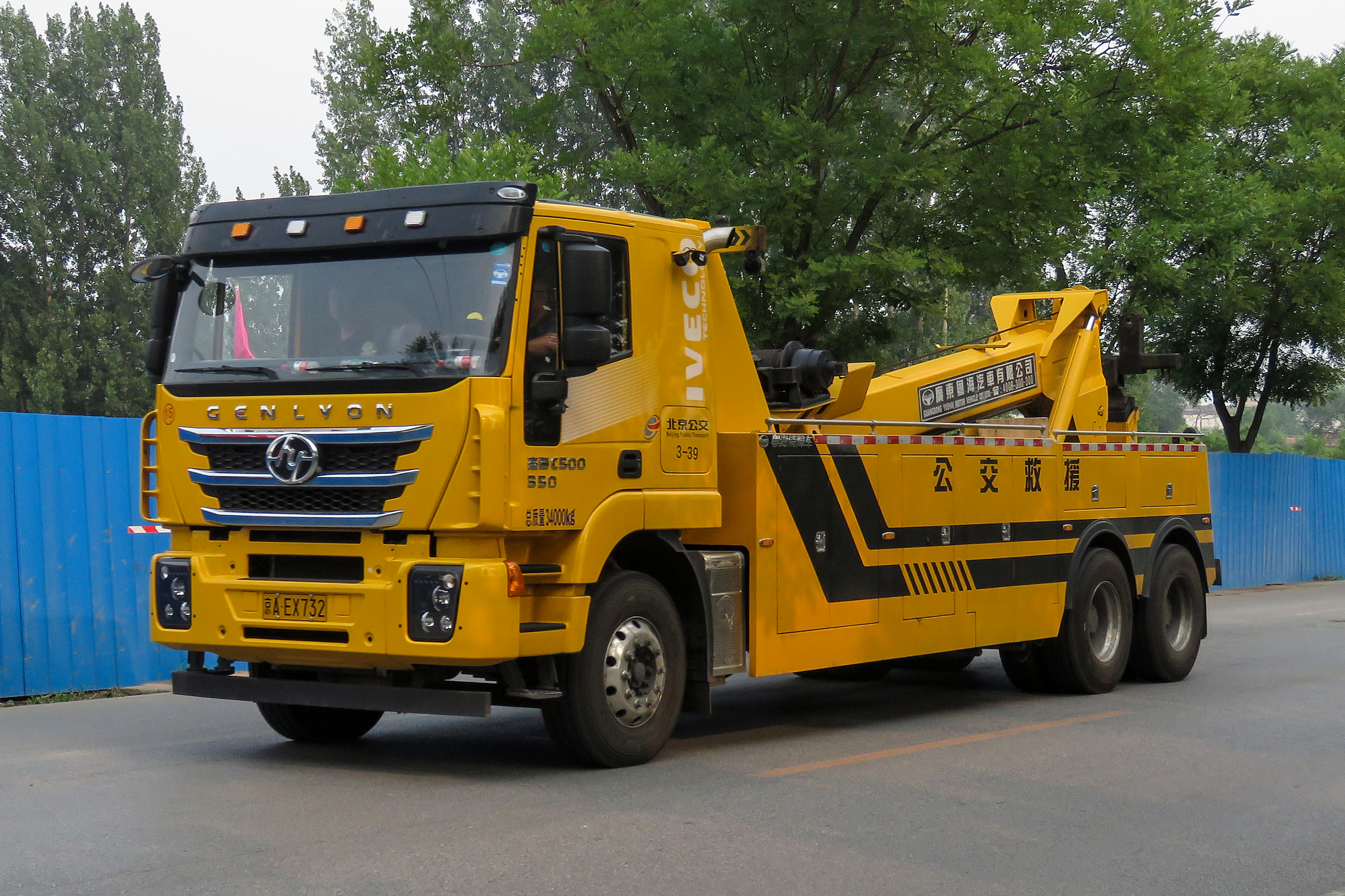
Hongyan Genlyon

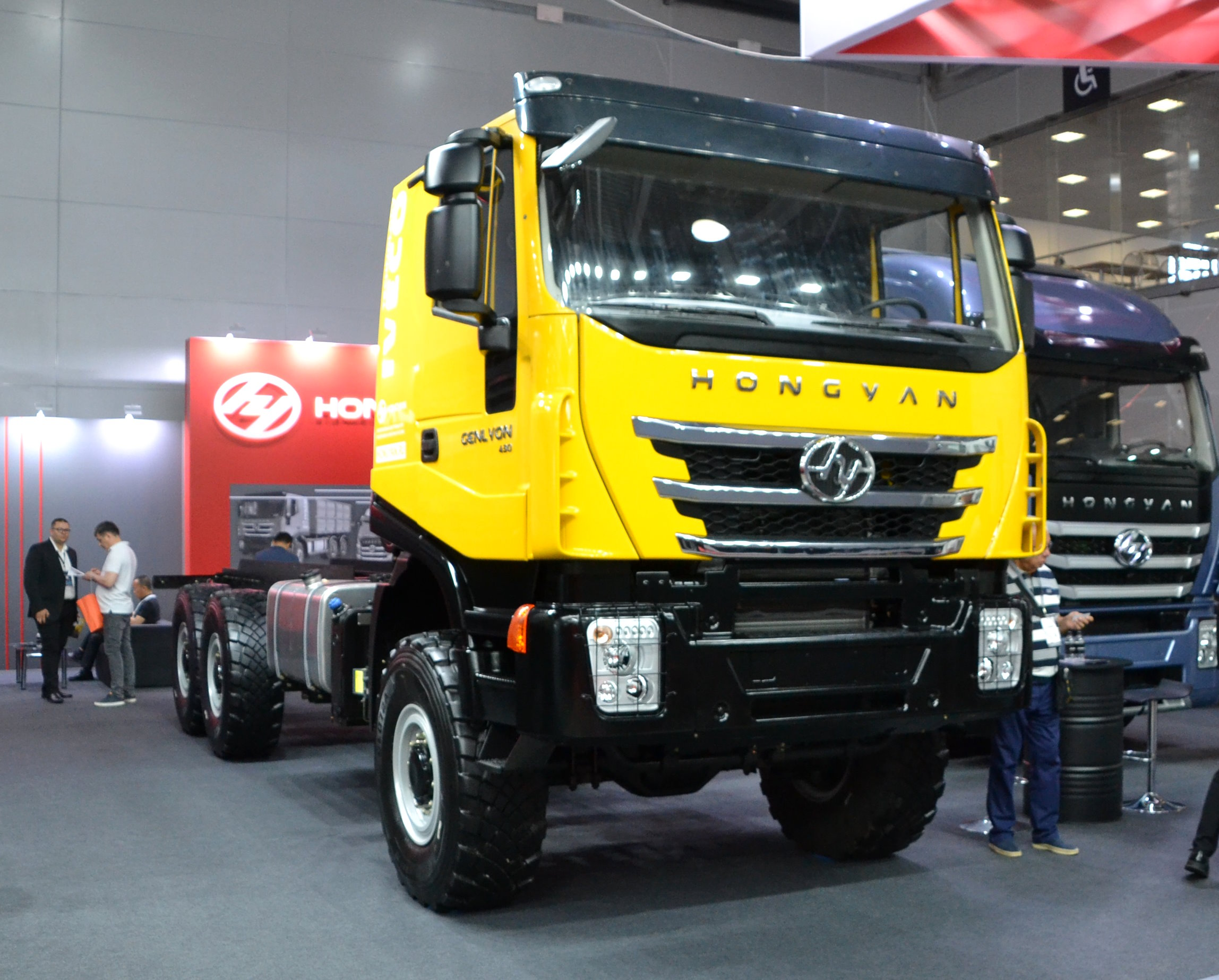
Hongyan Genlyon Truck

=== Sunwin ===
SAIC Sunwin is a brand specialized in producing passenger buses and trolleybuses.

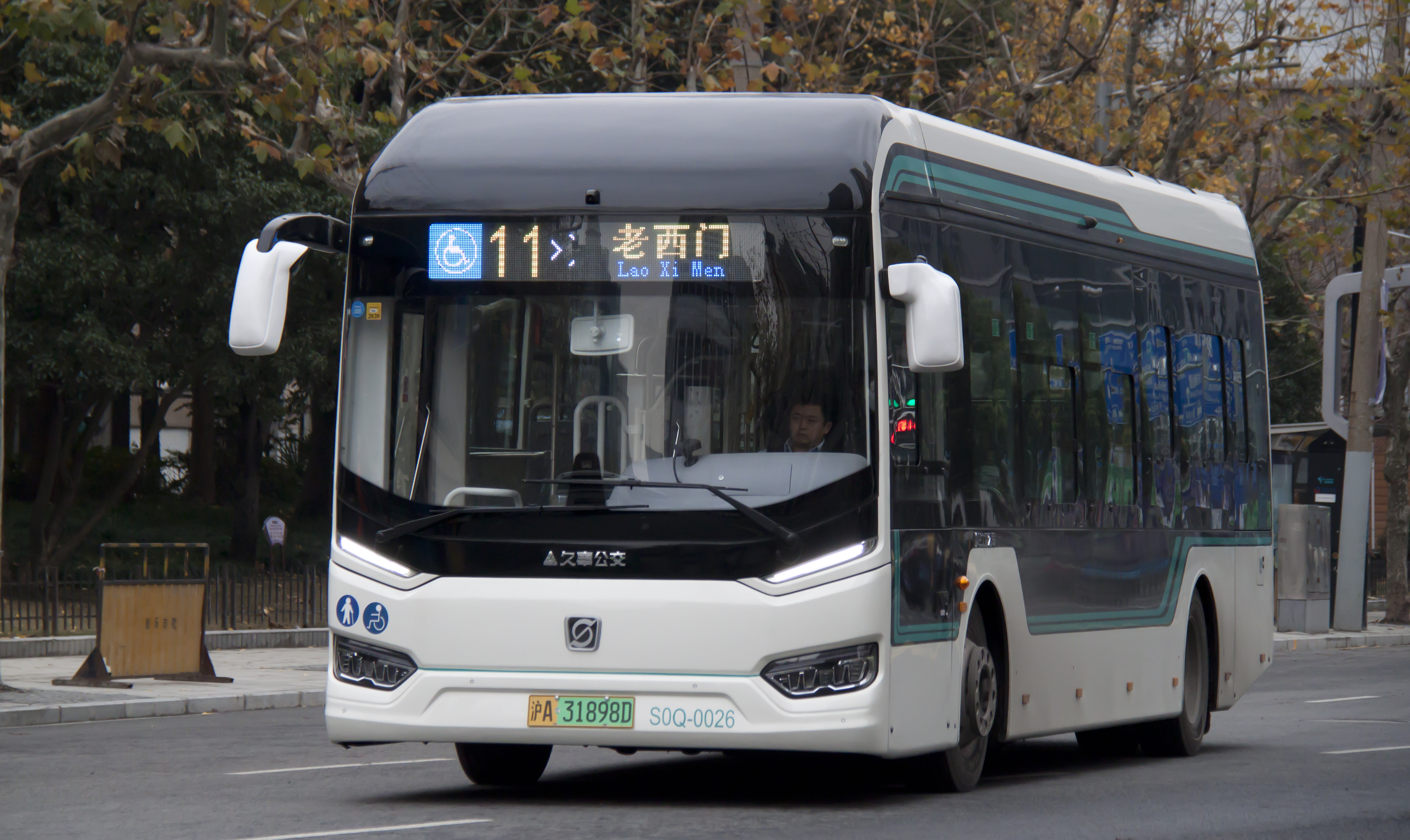
Sunwin iev10

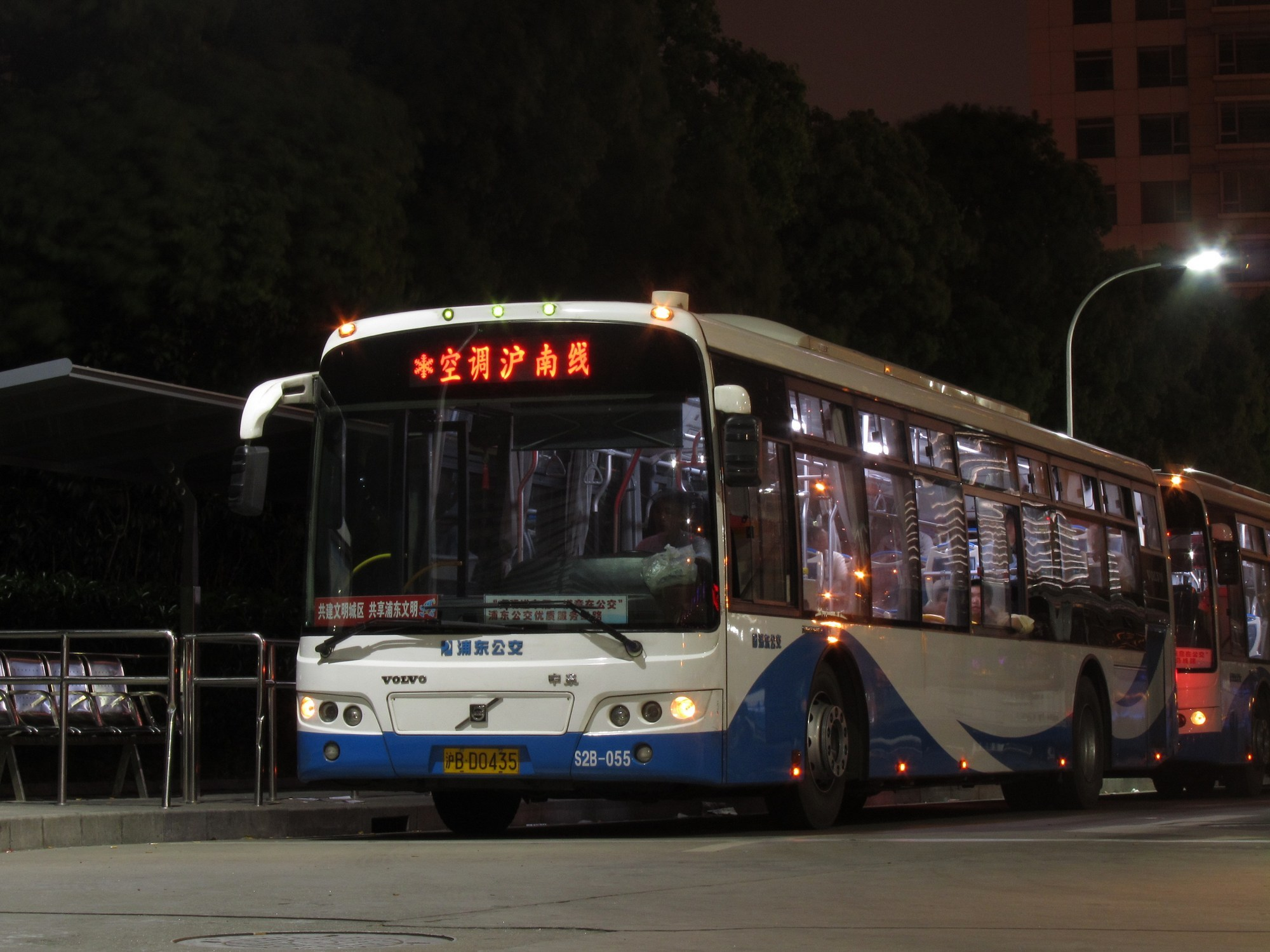
Sunwin SWB6120V4LE, based on Volvo B7RLE chassis

=== Naveco ===
In 2021, SAIC announced an increase in its holdings of Nanjing Iveco (Naveco). SAIC's subsidiary, Nanjing Automobile Group holds a 50% stake, while SAIC itself holds 30.1%, and IVECO S.P.A. holds 19.9%. SAIC's ownership of Naveco has now risen to 80.1%, making the Italian brand a strategic investor.

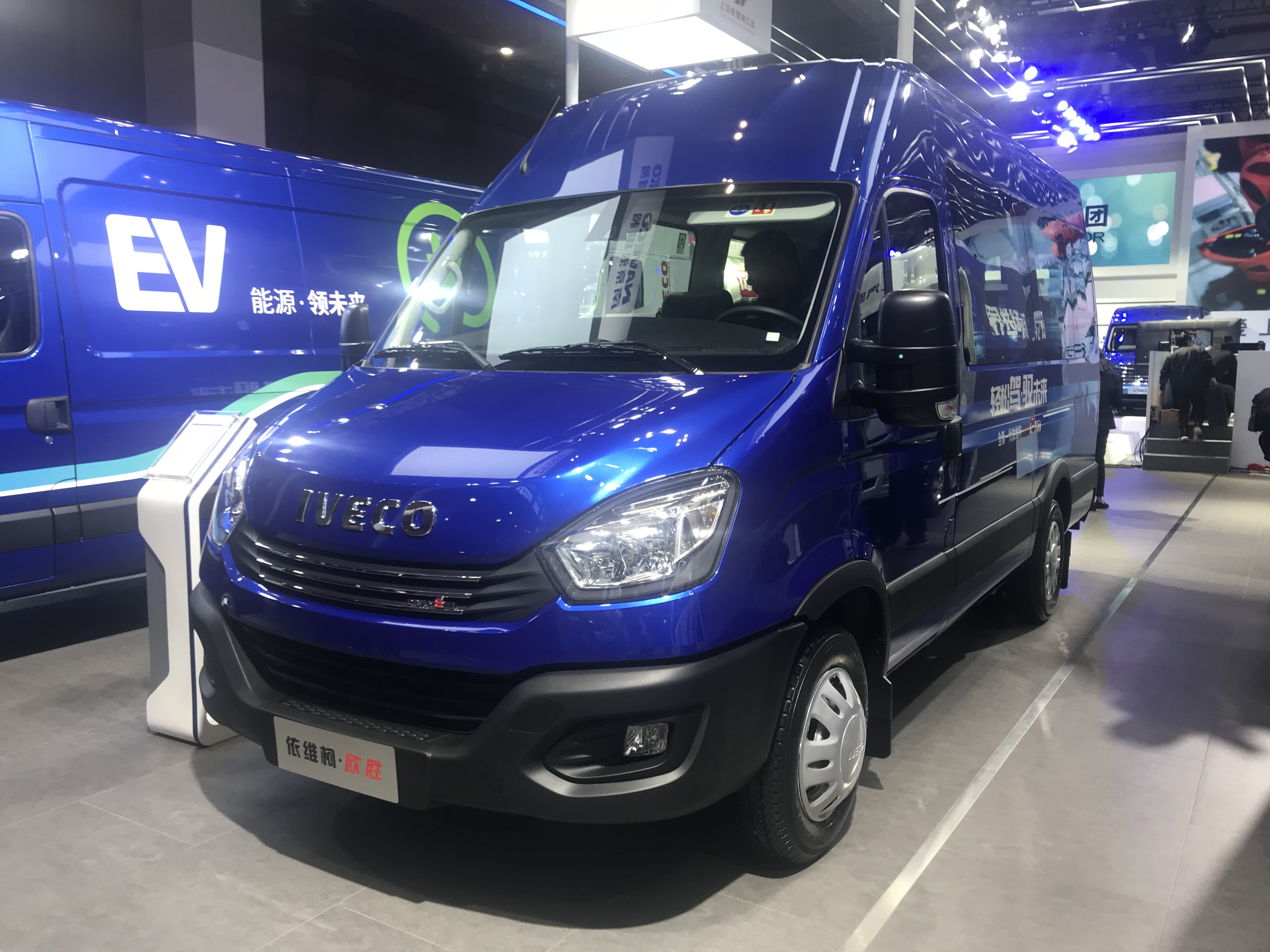
Iveco Daily Ousheng

== Joint ventures ==
SAIC has joint ventures with foreign automakers like General Motors and Volkswagen to produce and sell their vehicles in China. Additionally, SAIC also has several joint venture operations outside China.

=== SAIC Volkswagen Automotive ===
SAIC Volkswagen (SAIC-VW), previously Shanghai Volkswagen, is a joint venture between SAIC and German manufacturer Volkswagen Group. Founded in 1984 as one of the early joint venture manufacturers in China, the company manufactures and sells Volkswagen, AUDI and Audi vehicles in China.

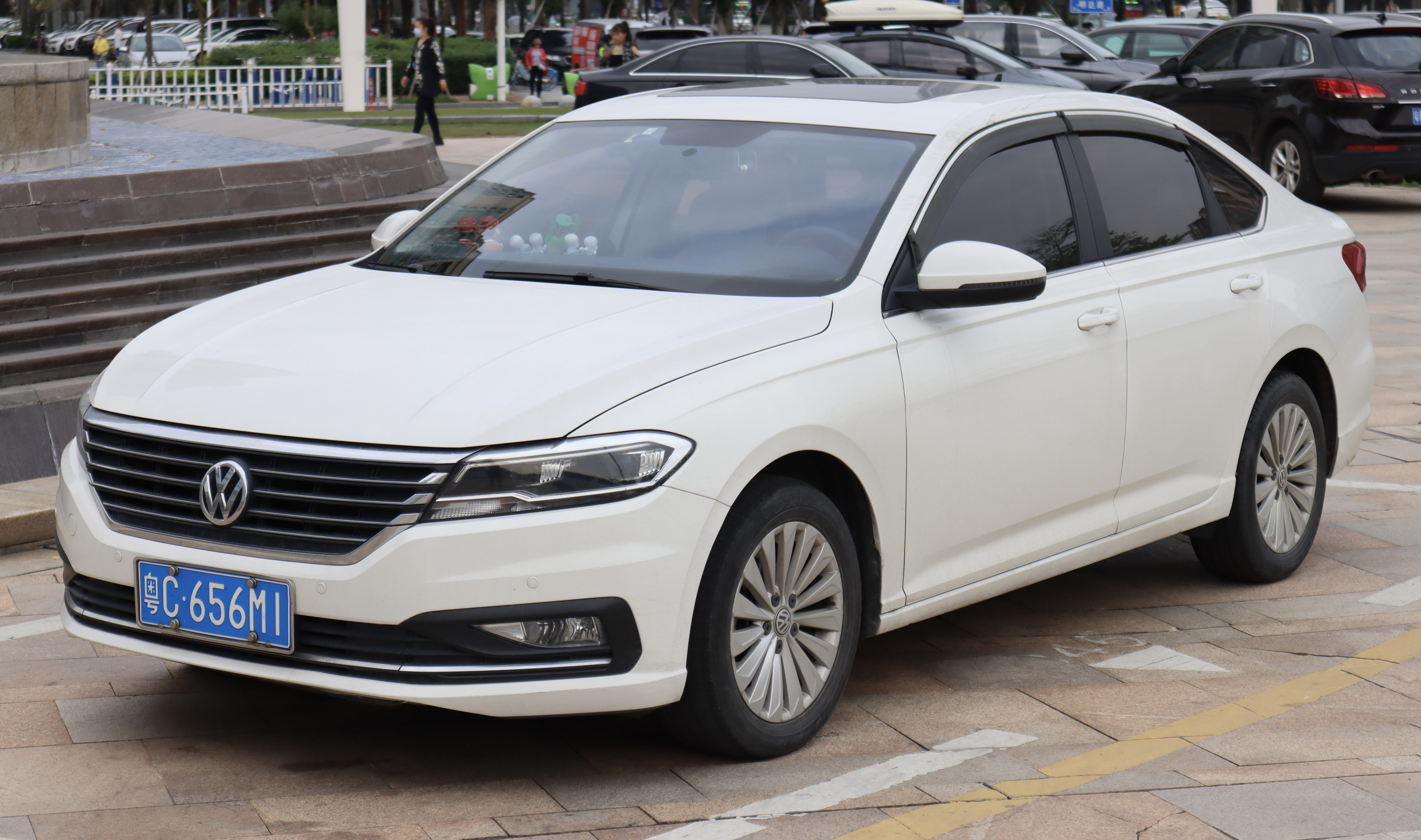
Volkswagen Lavida

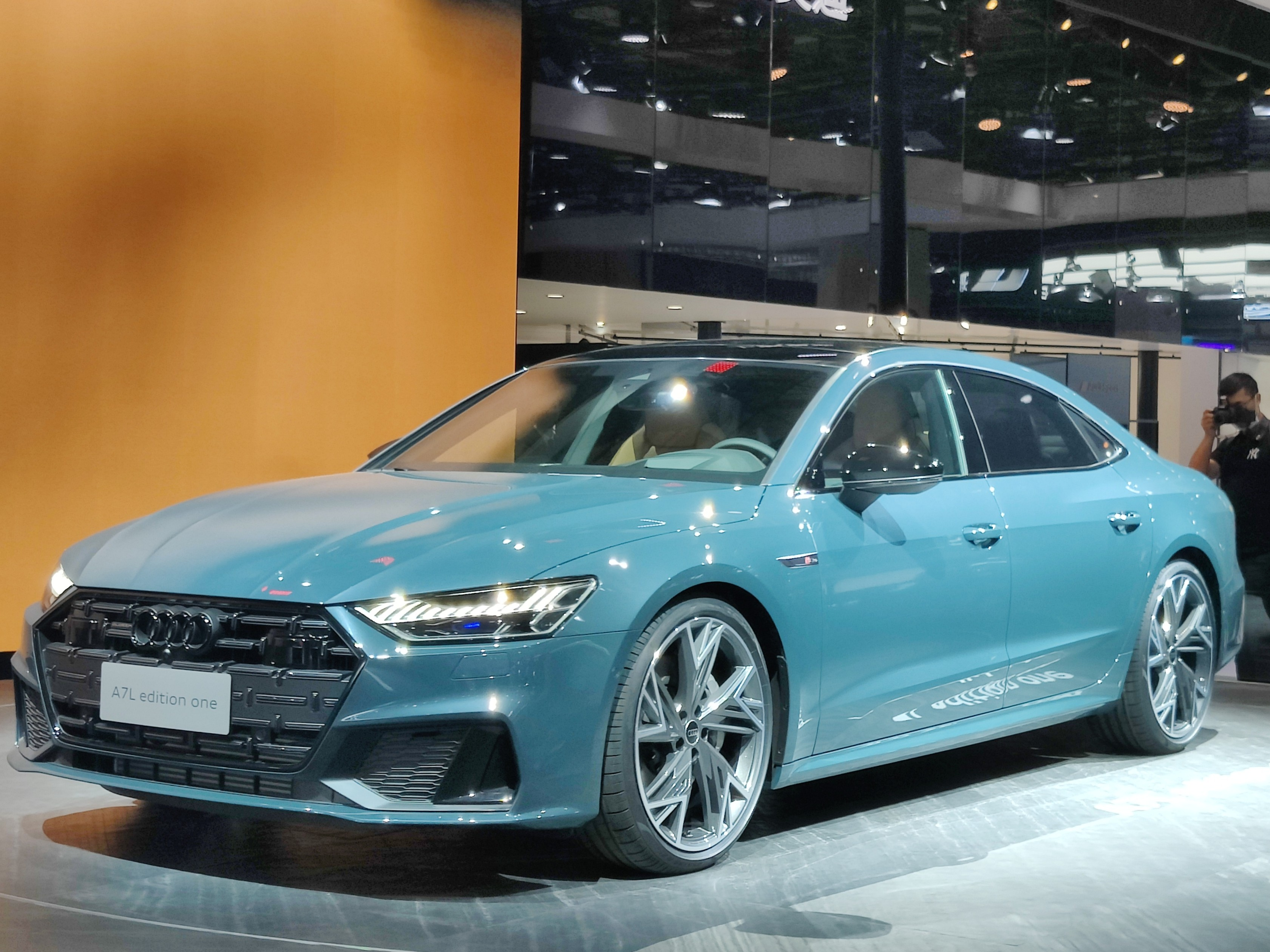
Audi A7L

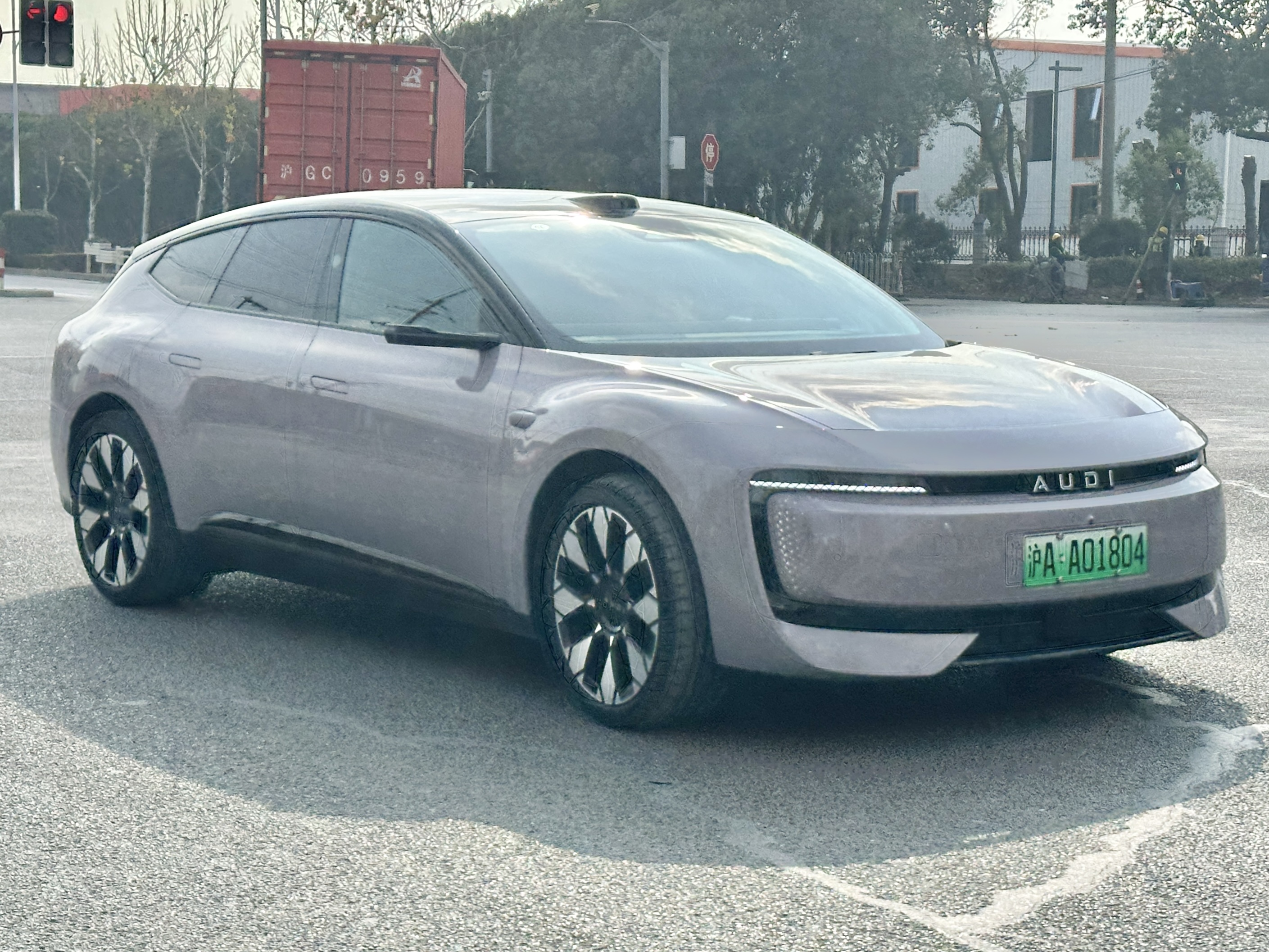
AUDI E5

=== SAIC General Motors ===
SAIC General Motors (SAIC-GM), previously Shanghai GM, is a joint venture between SAIC and American manufacturer General Motors. Founded in 1997, it manufactures and sells Buick, Chevrolet, and Cadillac vehicles in China for the domestic market and exports.

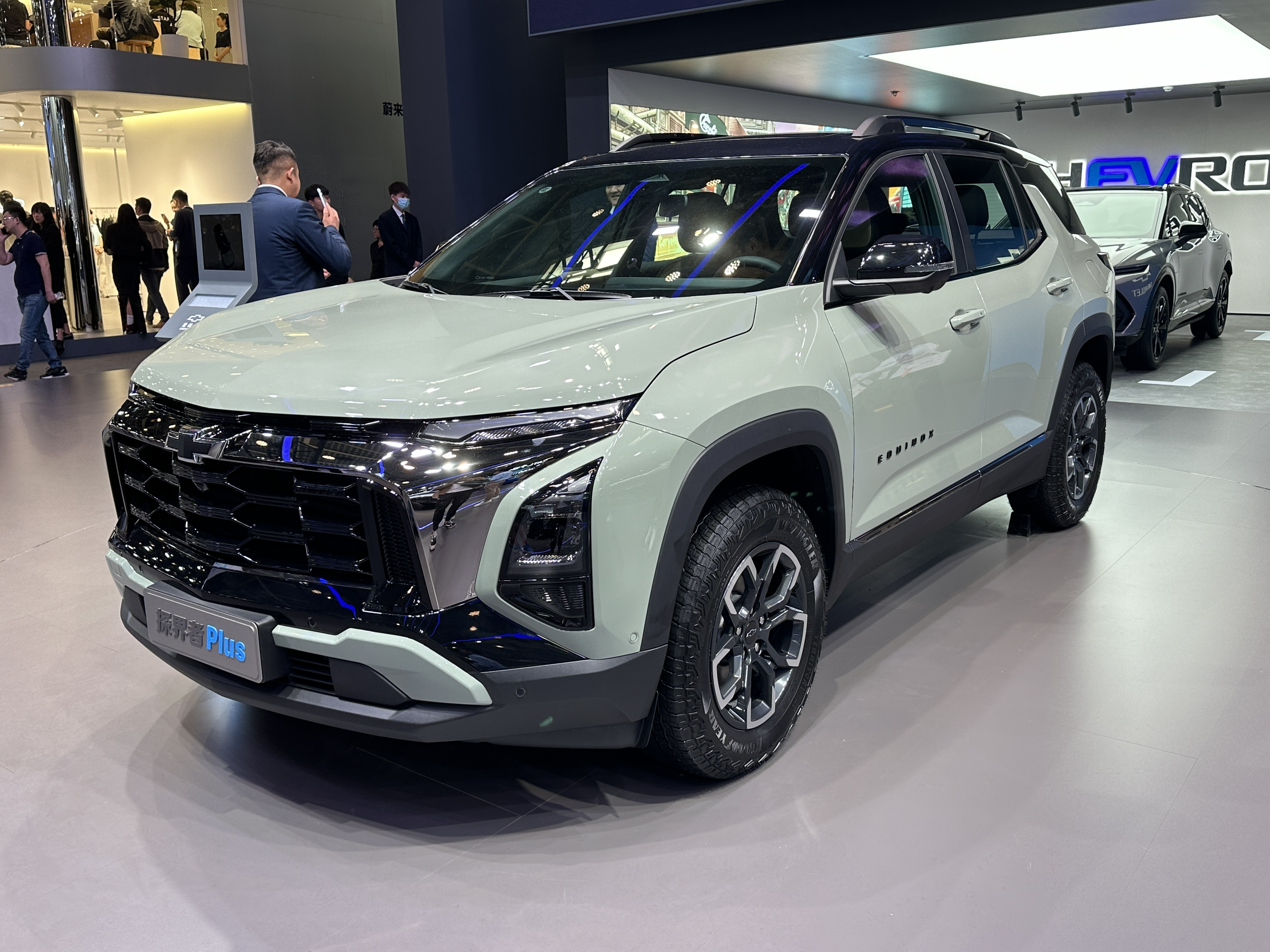
Chevrolet Equinox Plus

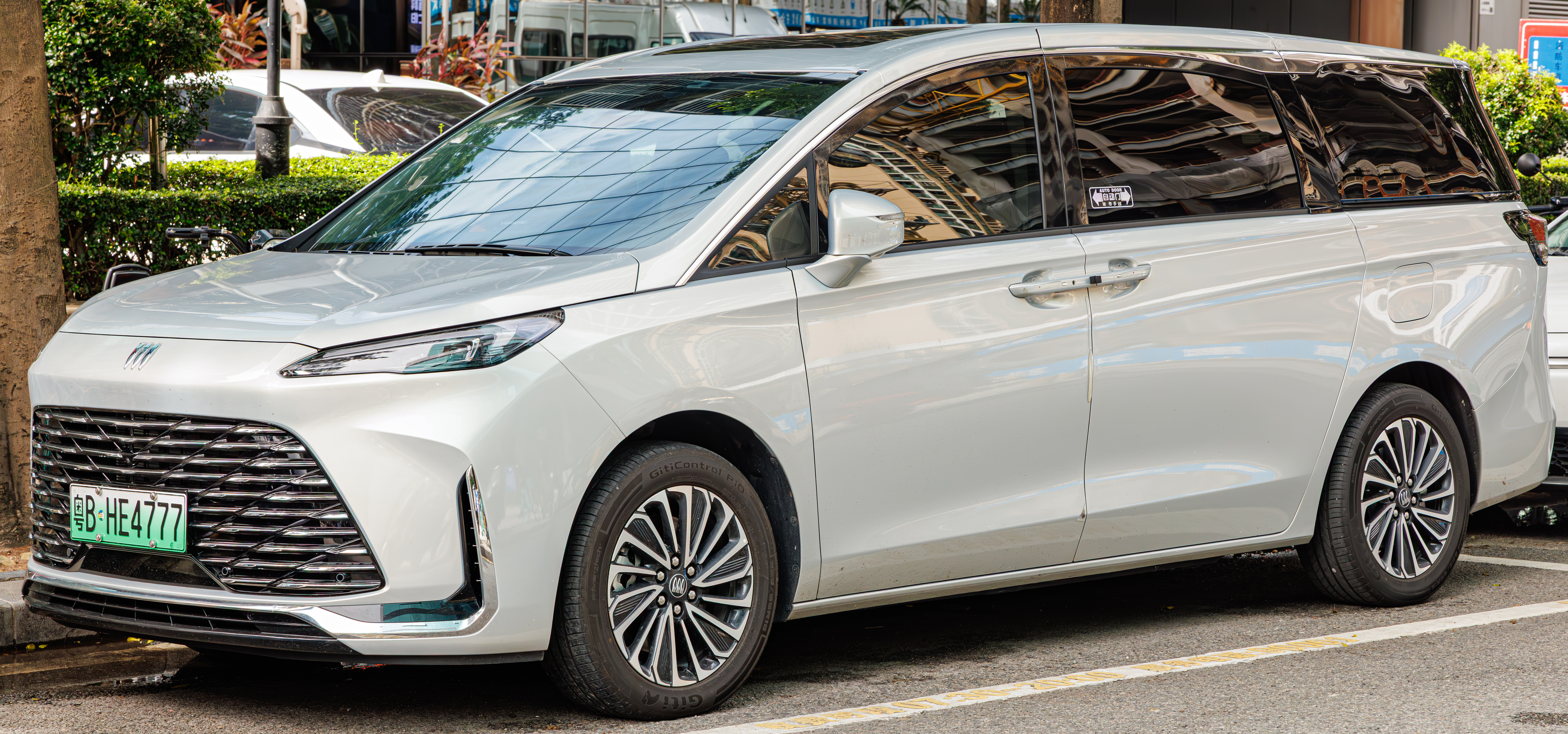
Buick GL8 LS

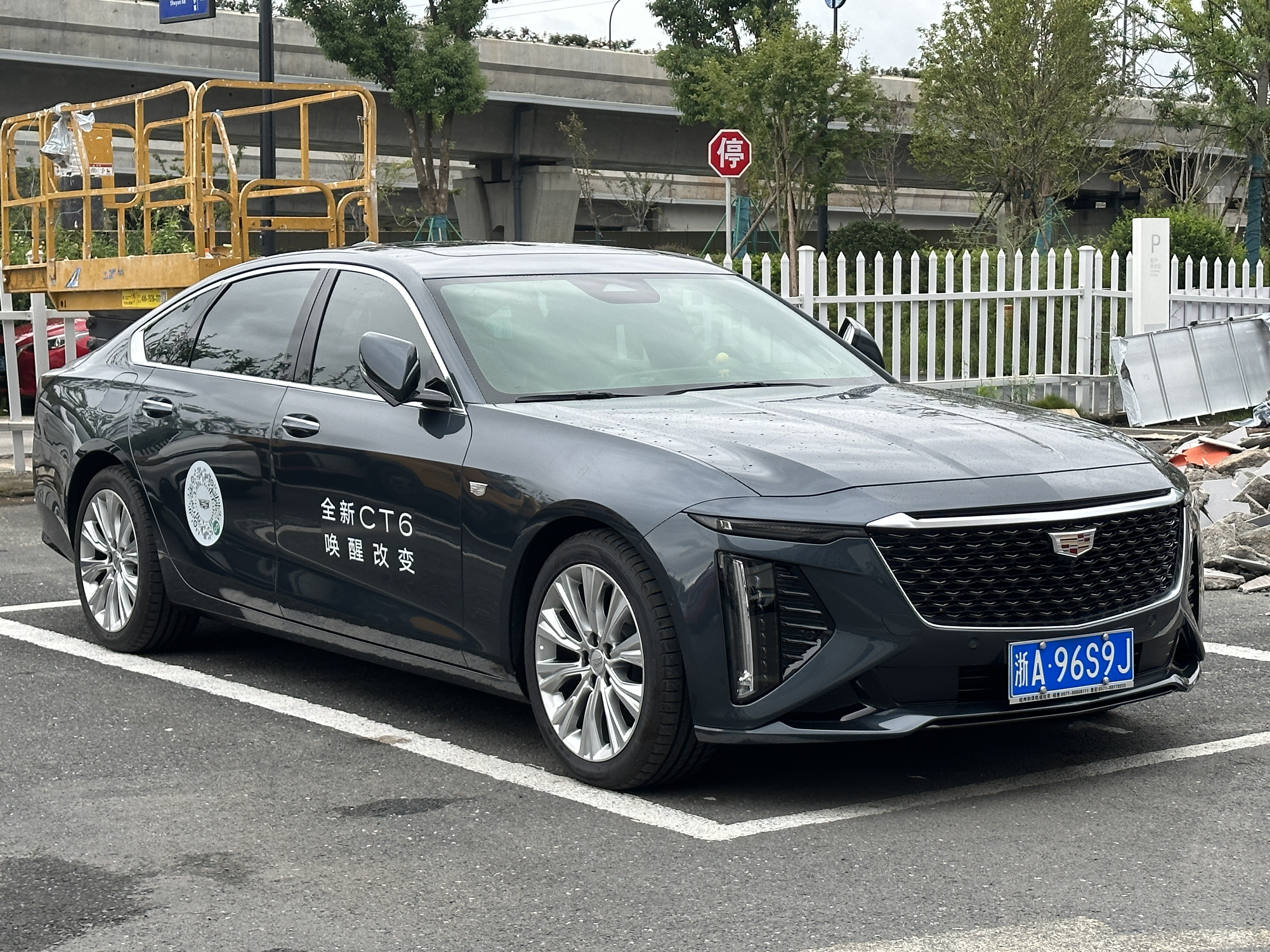
Cadillac CT6

=== SAIC-Charoen Pokphand ===
SAIC produces MG Motor vehicles through this joint venture with Charoen Pokphand for their Thailand subsidiary.

=== JSW MG Motor India ===
JSW MG Motor India, formerly known as MG Motor India until 2024, is SAIC's joint venture for its operations in India. Established in 2019, it focuses on producing and marketing MG-branded vehicles. In 2023, it was restructured from a wholly owned subsidiary into a joint venture with the Indian multinational conglomerate JSW Group.

=== Technomous ===
Established with Austrian technology provider TTTech in 2018 for Intelligent and Autonomous Driving solutions.

== Sales ==
SAIC group sales by brand (joint-venture brands excluded)
| | Total | SAIC Passenger Vehicle | | | | IM | Maxus/LDV | SAIC-GM-Wuling | | Hongyan | Sunwin | Naveco |
| | Total | MG | Rising | Roewe | SAIC | IM | Maxus/LDV | Wuling | Baojun | Hongyan | Sunwin | Naveco |
|---|---|---|---|---|---|---|---|---|---|---|---|---|
| 2010 | 1,424,513 | 29,603 | - | 131,027 | - | - | - | 1,157,258 | - | 33,258 | 3,098 | - |
| 2011 | 1,433,387 | 50,349 | - | 112,825 | - | - | 2,833 | 1,210,824 | 21,854 | 31,500 | 3,152 | - |
| 2012 | 1,659,973 | 79,343 | - | 122,952 | - | - | 7,076 | 1,503,868 | 80,323 | 17,008 | 3,250 | - |
| 2013 | 1,884,112 | 83,896 | - | 152,705 | - | - | 11,032 | 1,349,964 | 100,500 | 28,008 | 3,783 | - |
| 2014 | 2,051,240 | 64,651 | - | 126,590 | - | - | 21,016 | 1,628,493 | 181,586 | 25,000 | 3,866 | - |
| 2015 | 2,272,961 | 83,294 | - | 99,350 | - | - | 35,071 | 1,541,516 | 502,872 | 8,708 | 2,103 | - |
| 2016 | 2,533,586 | 98,714 | - | 241,026 | - | - | 46,145 | 1,369,618 | 760,559 | 15,517 | 2,007 | - |
| 2017 | 2,811,224 | 158,574 | - | 385,235 | - | - | 71,117 | 1,138,726 | 1,016,342 | 40,017 | 1,213 | - |
| 2018 | 2,957,136 | 270,647 | - | 466,608 | - | - | 84,017 | 1,197,932 | 879,077 | 58,037 | 818 | - |
| 2019 | 2,621,117 | 298,000 | - | 428,597 | - | - | 153,024 | 1,078,234 | 604,026 | 58,077 | 1,159 | - |
| 2020 | 2,575,775 | 310,000 | - | 384,321 | - | - | 192,617 | 1,184,088 | 422,550 | 80,077 | 2,122 | - |
| 2021 | 2,845,309 | 471,992 | 14,241 | 343,283 | - | - | 232,844 | 1,470,783 | 214,947 | 63,007 | 825 | 33,387 |
| 2022 | 2,779,123 | 571,887 | 29,780 | 286,018 | - | 5,000 | 214,155 | 1,524,960 | 105,084 | 13,107 | 2,009 | 27,123 |
| 2023 | 2,804,845 | 903,789 | 21,012 | 145,437 | - | 38,253 | 226,664 | 1,376,490 | 51,641 | 41,559 | | |
| 2024 | 2,429,925 | 792,404 | | | - | 65,503 | 177,629 | 1,364,310 | | 30,079 | | |
| 2025 | 2,948,518 | 986,130 | | | | 81,017 | 222,286 | 1,636,082 | | 23,003 | | |
Due to SAIC only disclosing the combined sales figures for the MG, Rising, and Roewe brands as "SAIC Passenger Vehicle", the individual sales figures for Rising and Roewe are derived from the registered numbers in China (as these two brands are exclusively sold in China currently). The separate sales data for MG brand is calculated as the "Rising registered number" plus "Roewe registered number" minus the "total sales of SAIC Passenger Vehicle", potentially resulting in some discrepancies to the actual data.

== Overseas markets ==
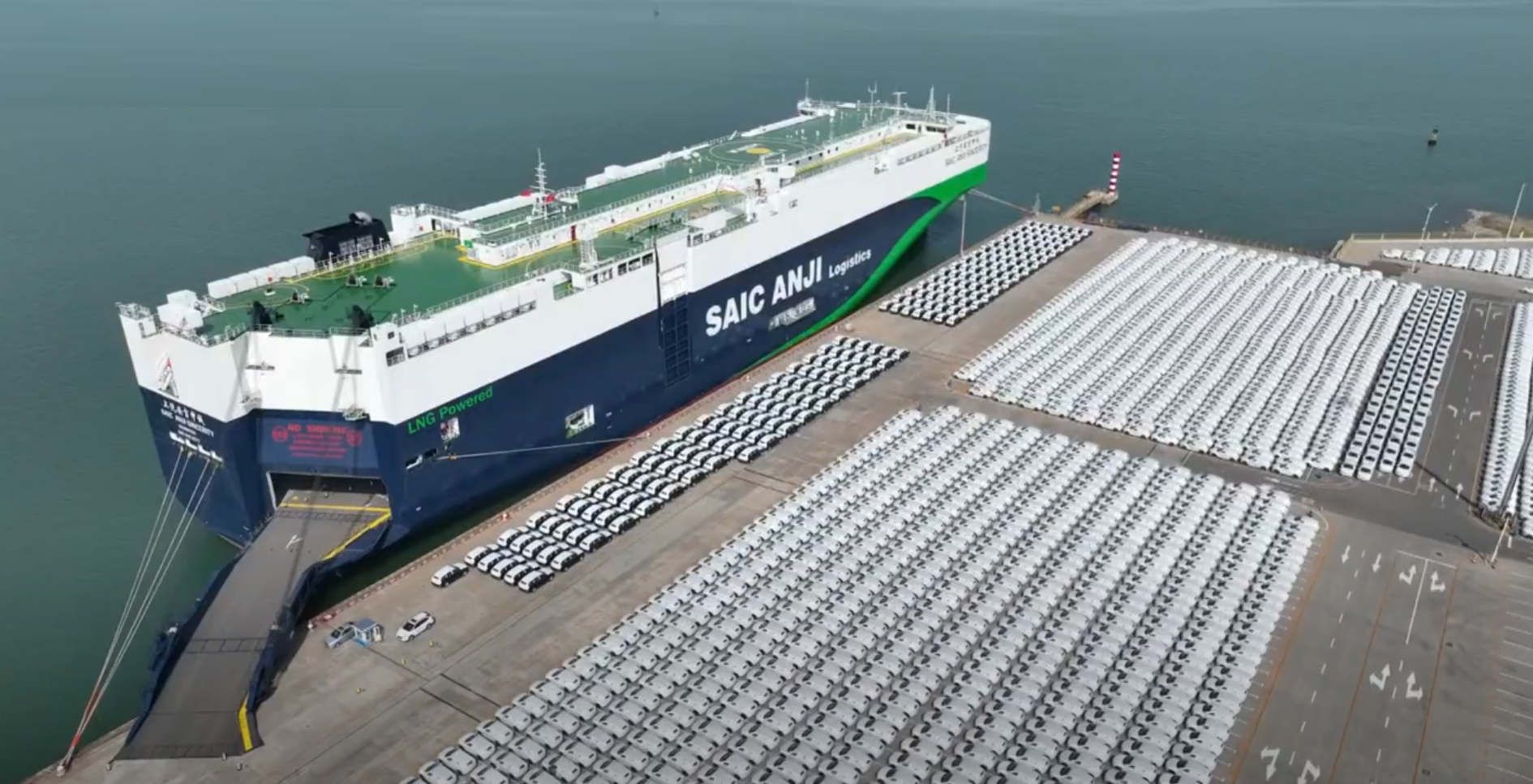
A ro-ro ship owned by SAIC Anji Logistics at the Tianjin port

=== UK ===
On 13 April 2011, vehicle assembly resumed at the MG Motor UK Longbridge plant as the first MG 6 to be produced in the United Kingdom came off the production line, but ended in 2016 when SAIC moved production to China. It retains a technical subsidiary SAIC Motor UK on site.

=== Philippines ===
On 19 July 2023, SAIC's Philippines subsidiary SAIC Motor Philippines, Inc. has appointed the new distributor and importer of MG vehicles and services in the country with launch of the all-new 2024 MG4 EV and MG Marvel R for the local market by October 2023. Aside from importation, distribution, and aftersales operations, SMP’s functions also include the management of MG’s dealership network in the Philippines. This is currently composed of 42 authorized dealer locations and the addition of four more dealerships before the close of 2023, and a goal to have 60 MG dealerships running by 2025.

=== US ===
In June 2012, SAIC's United States-based subsidiary Shanghai Automotive Industries Corp USA, Inc. opened a new North American Operations Center in Birmingham, Michigan. The opening ceremony was attended by Rick Snyder, Governor of Michigan, Oakland County Executive L. Brooks Patterson, and senior executives from General Motors and SAIC Motor. The 30,000-square-foot, three-story facility will house nearly 100 staff and focus on sourcing components.

== Facilities ==
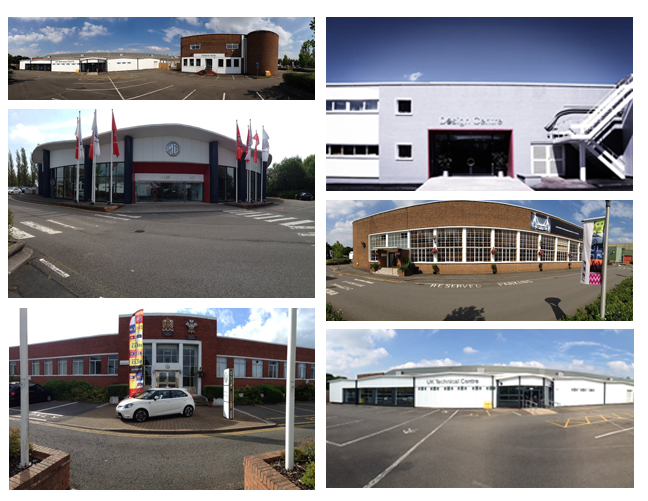
MG Motor UK HQ – SAIC UK Technical & Design Centre

SAIC has numerous production facilities in China, including sites in: Chongqing, Liuzhou, Qingdao, Shanghai, Shenyang, and Yantai. It also had an assembly plant in the United Kingdom, the Longbridge plant. It also has a plant in Chonburi, Thailand, Cikarang, Indonesia, and Halol, India.

=== Research and development ===
SAIC operated a large research and development centre in the United Kingdom, the SAIC Motor UK Technical Centre, which as of 2012 employed around 275 engineers and 25 designers. The UK Technical Centre was the principal site worldwide for the development of MG cars, also playing a major role in the development of Roewe products. However in June 2019, SAIC Motor closed the UK Technical Centre making over 300 engineers redundant in the process.

== See also ==
- Automobile manufacturers and brands of China
- List of automotive manufacturers by production
- List of automobile manufacturers of China
- Automotive industry in China
