= GB Corp =

Egyptian manufacturer of automobiles

GB Corp جي بي كورب
- Type: S.A.E
- Industry: Automotive industry
- Founded: 1960
- Founders: Kamal Ghabbour; Sadek Ghabbour
- Headquarters: Cairo, Egypt
- Area served: Egypt, Iraq, Jordan, Kenya
- Key people: Nader Ghabbour (CEO); Dina Ghabbour (CBDO); Wissam Al Adany (CIO)
- Products: Automobiles, Buses, Trucks and Motorcycles
- Operating income: E£4,536.7 million (Q3 2024)
- Net income: E£1,794.2 million (Q3 2024)
- Website: https://gb-corporation.com/

GB Corp, previously Ghabbour Group, is an Egyptian manufacturer of automobiles, buses, trucks and motorcycles located in Cairo.

The company was founded in 1960 by the brothers Kamal and Sadek Ghabbour because they realized that the automotive sector was a growing market. In its early days the company was named Ghabbour Brothers. Formerly, the group manufactured Saviem (later RVI) vehicles. Today the Group manufactures vehicles for numerous brands such as: Bajaj Auto, Hyundai and Volvo. With an annual output of 150,000 units, the Ghabbour Group is currently the largest automobile manufacturer in Egypt, with operations in Iraq, under the names GK Auto and GQ Auto, and in Kenya.

== Model overview (Egyptian market) ==
GB is an authorized distributor for 6 international car brands, 1 Motorcycle brand, 9 Commercial Vehicle brands, 4 Tire brands, and 4 Spare Part brands in Egypt.

=== Hyundai ===
- Hyundai Accent RB
- Hyundai Elantra AD
- Hyundai Elantra CN7
- Hyundai Tucson NX4
- Hyundai Santa Fe
- Hyundai Ioniq 5/Ioniq 5N
- Hyundai Ioniq 6
- Hyundai Staria

=== Mazda ===
- Mazda 6 sedan
- Mazda 3 sedan & hatchback
- Mazda 2 sedan
- Mazda CX-9

=== Geely ===
It only had two models in its initial lineup: the Geely Emgrand, and the Geely Imperial. The brand faced a lot of criticism at one point for endangering people's lives. The campaign generated a lot of negative sentiment towards the brand.

=== Chery ===
- Chery Arrizo 5
- Chery Tiggo 3 (discontinued in 2023)
- Chery Tiggo 4 Pro
- Chery Tiggo 7
- Chery Tiggo 7 Pro
- Chery Tiggo 8
- Chery Tiggo 8 Pro
- Chery eQ7

=== Changan ===
- Changan UNI-T
- Changan Alsvin
- Changan Eado DT
- Changan CS15
- Changan CS35 Plus
- Changan CS55 Plus

=== Haval ===
- Haval H6
- Haval Jolion/Jolion Pro

=== Bajaj Auto ===
- Bajaj Boxer
- Bajaj Pulsar
- Bajaj Maxima
- Bajaj Tuk-Tuk-Re

=== Volvo Trucks ===
- Volvo FH
- Volvo FL6
- Volvo FM
- Volvo Splendido (B12B Bus Type GVW)

=== Fuso ===
- Mitsubishi Canter
- Mitsubishi Cruiser
- Mitsubishi Eagle
- Mitsubishi FP
- Mitsubishi FV
- Mitsubishi Rosa

=== MCV ===
- ECHOLINE E10 / 20 (also known as Ecoline-DAFC and FOTON in the People's Republic of China)
- ECHOLINE E30 (also known as Ecoline-DAFC and FOTON in the People's Republic of China)
- ECHOLINE E40 (also known as Ecoline-DAFC and FOTON in the People's Republic of China)
- MCV eVolution-MAN C100 / C110 / C120 (from 2004)
- MCV eVolution-DENNIS C101 / C111 / C121 (from 2004)
- MCV eVolution C123RLE (for Volvo B7RLE)
- MCV eVolution C124RLE (for Mercedes-Benz OC500LE)
- MCV Evora
- MCV EvoSeti
- MCV Alfa
- MCV Ego (since 2006; Great Britain)
- MCV Stirling
- MCV DD103 (for Volvo B9TL)
- Mercedes-Benz MCV 200 Safari (since 2010, based on the Mercedes-Benz Atego)
- Mercedes-Benz MCV 240E (since 2008)
- Mercedes-Benz MCV 260C / R / S (since 2000)
- Mercedes-Benz MCV 260T
- Mercedes-Benz MCV 400 E / H / R / T
- Mercedes-Benz MCV 500 (since 1996)
- Mercedes-Benz MCV 600 (since 1996)
- Mercedes-Benz MCV C120 / C120 LE
- Mercedes-Benz Tourismo
- Mercedes-Benz Travego

=== Tires ===
GB is the official distributor for 4 tire brands:

=== Spare parts ===
GB also has several outlets for spare parts:

== Model overview (Iraqi market) ==
GB Corp operates in Iraq under the names GK Auto, and GQ Auto for Bajaj vehicles. GB is an official dealer for MG and Bajaj in Iraq.

=== MG Motor ===
- MG One
- MG 3
- MG 5
- MG 7
- MG GT
- MG RX5
- MG RX8
- MG RX8 Black Edition
- MG HS
- MG ZST
- MG Whale
- MG T60

=== Bajaj Auto ===
- Bajaj Dominar D400

== Model overview (Jordan) ==
GB is the sole distributor of MG Motor and Rising Auto in Jordan, under the name of GKS Auto.

=== MG Motor ===
- MG One
- MG 3
- MG 5
- MG 7
- MG GT
- MG RX5
- MG RX8
- MG RX8 Black Edition
- MG HS
- MG ZST
- MG ZS EV
- MG Whale
- MG T60
- MG 4 Electric
- MG RX9

=== Rising Auto ===
- Rising Auto R7
- Rising Auto F7

== Model overview (Kenya) ==
GB is the sole distributor in Kenya for the following brands:

== Stock information and Board of Directors ==
GB Corp is listed on the Egyptian Exchange as GBCO.

=== Total shares listed ===
1,085,500,000

Division of Shares as of Q1 2024
Shares	Percentage of Shares
Ghabbour family	63,4 %
Free float	36.6%

Division of Free Float Shares as of Q1 2024
Shares	Percentage of Shares
RG Investments S.A.R.L	58,92 %
MIRI Strategic Emerging Markets Fund	6.84%
Olayan Saudi Investments	5.1%
Total Shares (excl. Anonymous Shareholders)	769,112,462
Anonymous Shareholders (Shareholders with less than a 5% Ownership Stake)	29.14%

=== Board of Directors ===
The current Board of Directors expires in March 2025.

Division of the Board of Directors as of Q1 2024
Name	Title
Mr. Mohamed Naguib	Non-Executive Chairman
Mr. Mounir Fakhry Abdelnour	Independent Board Member
Mr. Nader Ghabbour	Chief Executive Officer
Mr. Mansour Kabbani	Non-Executive Director
Mr. Abbas El Sayed	Executive Director
Ms. Lobna El Dessouky	Independent Board Member
Ms. Marwa El Ayouti	Independent Board Member
