= Roewe Marvel X =

Roewe Marvel X Rising Marvel R
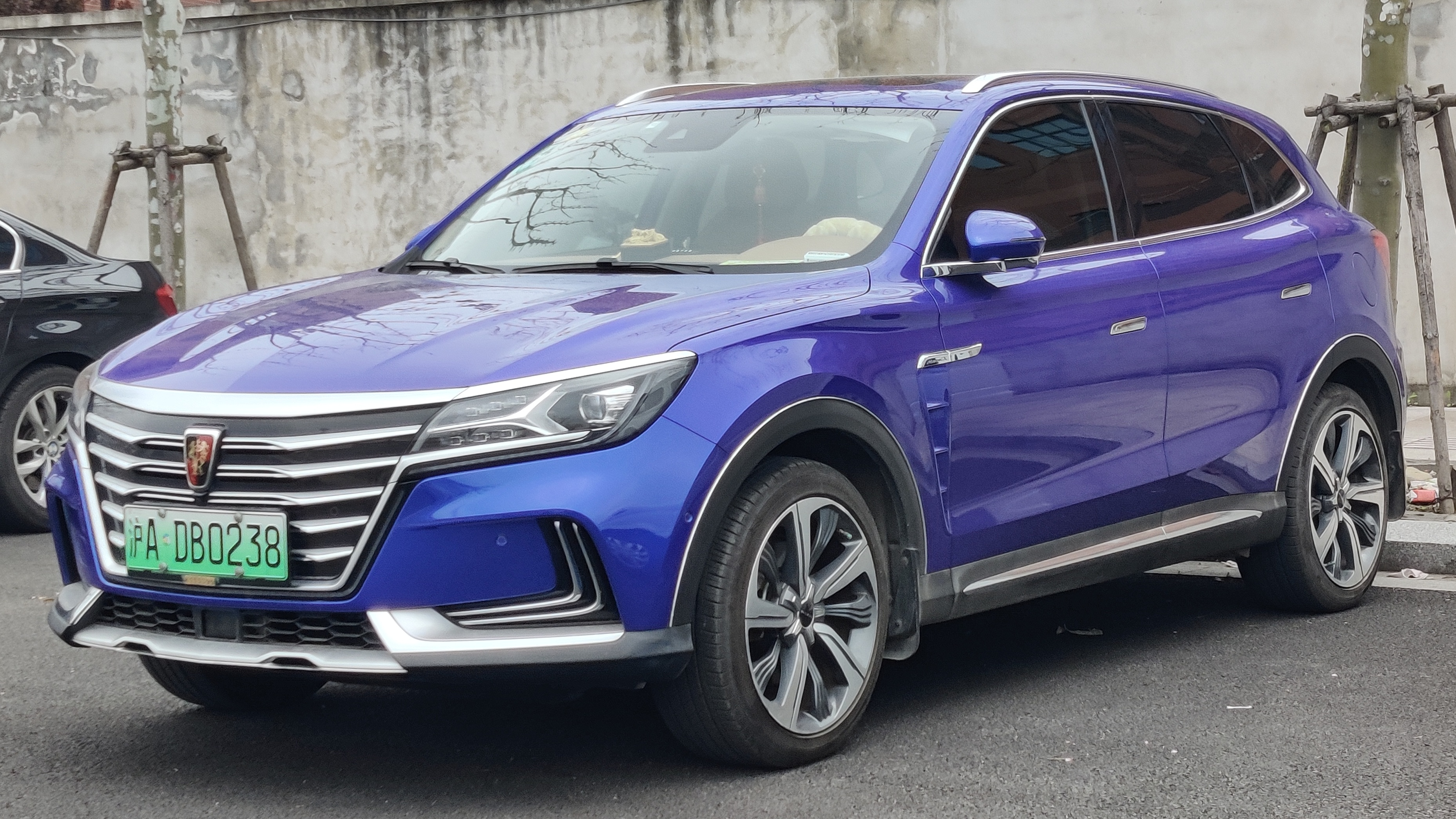
- Roewe Marvel X

Overview
- Manufacturer: SAIC Motor
- Also called: MG Marvel R (export)
- Production: 2018–2021 (Roewe Marvel X); 2020–2022 (Rising Marvel R); 2021–2026 (MG Marvel R)
- Assembly: China: Nanjing (NAC)

Body and chassis
- Class: Mid-size crossover SUV
- Body style: 5-door SUV
- Layout: Two-motors, rear-wheel drive Triple-motors, four-wheel drive

Powertrain
- Electric motor: 137 kW (184 hp; 186 PS) or 222 kW (298 hp; 302 PS) permanent magnet synchronous motor
- Transmission: Single-speed automatic
- Battery: 52.5 kWh lithium-ion, 70 kWh (MG Marvel R)

Dimensions
- Wheelbase: 2,800 mm (110.2 in)
- Length: 4,678 mm (184.2 in)
- Width: 1,919 mm (75.6 in)
- Height: 1,618 mm (63.7 in)

Chronology
- Successor: MGS6 EV (global) (MG Marvel R)

The Roewe Marvel X is a battery electric mid-size crossover SUV by the Chinese manufacturer SAIC Motor. It was launched under the Roewe brand in 2018 and was positioned above the RX5, and below the RX8. A revised version is marketed under the Rising Auto brand as the Rising Marvel R, which is sold in left-hand drive European markets as the MG Marvel R.

The Marvel R is positioned as part of the R-Line, which is a premium NEV sub-brand of Roewe by SAIC and is represented by the "R" logo.

== Roewe Marvel X ==
The Roewe Marvel X is the production version of the Vision E Concept, that debuted in April 2017, during the 2017 Shanghai Auto Show. The Roewe Marvel X crossover comes in two versions, in rear-wheel drive and all-wheel drive.

For the all-wheel-drive model, the front axle has an electric motor with the peak power of 85 kW (114 hp; 116 PS), and peak torque of 255 N⋅m (188 lb⋅ft), while the rear axle consists of two electric motors, with a combined peak power of 137 kW (184 hp; 186 PS), and peak torque of 410 N⋅m (300 lb⋅ft), adding up to a total of 302 hp (225 kW; 306 PS) and 665 N⋅m (490 lb⋅ft) of torque for the all-wheel-drive model. As for the driving performance, SAIC claims the top speed of 180 km/h (110 mph).

Power of the Marvel X comes from a 52.5 kWh lithium-ion battery. The battery takes 8.5 hours to charge on an AC charger, but a DC fast charger can charge the battery up to 85% in under 40 minutes. A kinetic energy recovery system is installed to improve range. The Marvel X electric range can reach up to 370 km (230 mi) for the RWD model and 403 km (250 mi) for the AWD model when driven conservatively.

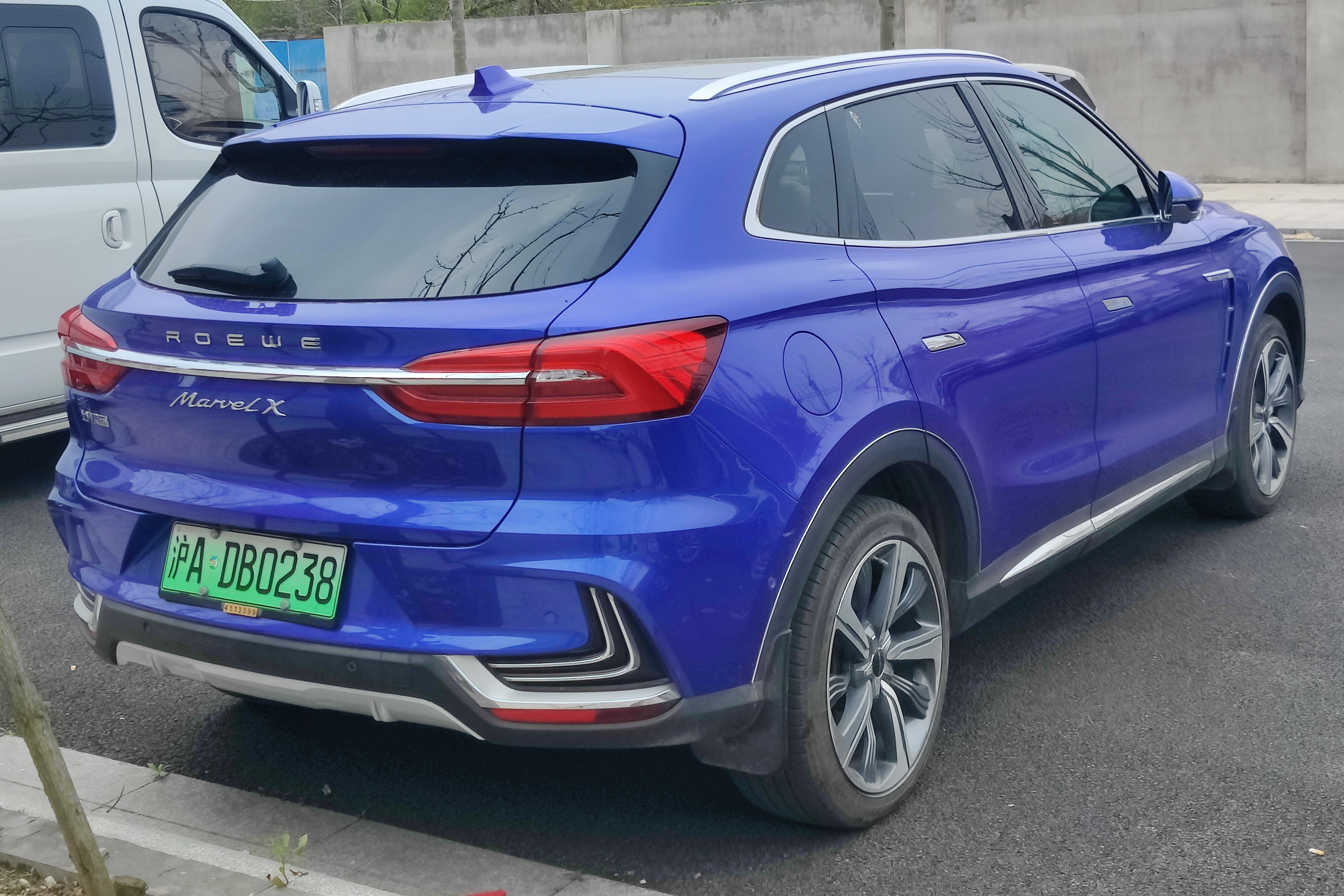
Rear view

== Rising Marvel R ==
The Rising Marvel R was unveiled as a concept car in May 2020, and the production version debuted during the 2020 Guangzhou Auto Show in November 2020. The Marvel R is the first car to feature Roewe's new R logo and the first product in the R-Line, followed by the Roewe R ER6 which is based on the Roewe i6 and would be available on the market first.

The Marvel R retains the overall shape of the Marvel X but gets a reworked front and rear for cleaner electric vehicle looks and aerodynamics. Roewe has co-developed the Marvel R with Huawei and the electronic system is built on the Barong 5000 technology platform equipped with V2X smart travel tech and creates a 5G smart cockpit. SAIC Motor, the parent company of Rising Auto, has been cooperating with Huawei since December 2018.

In March 2021, it was announced that the vehicle will be sold as the MG Marvel R in the European market. The MG Marvel R features a sizeable boot, 19.4-inch portrait touchscreen, 0 to 100 km/h (0 to 62 mph) in 4.9 seconds and top speed of 200 km/h (120 mph).

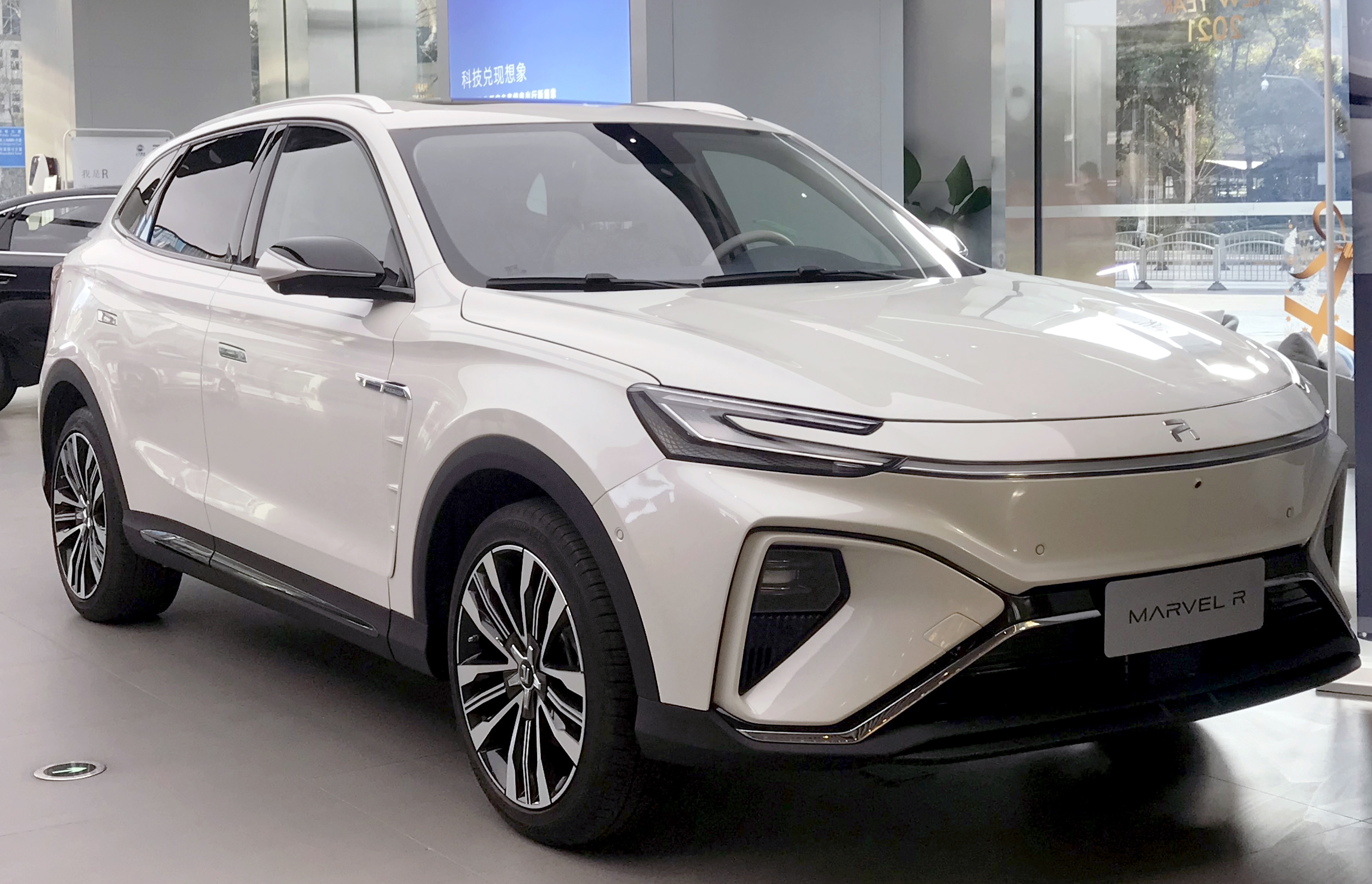
Rising Marvel R

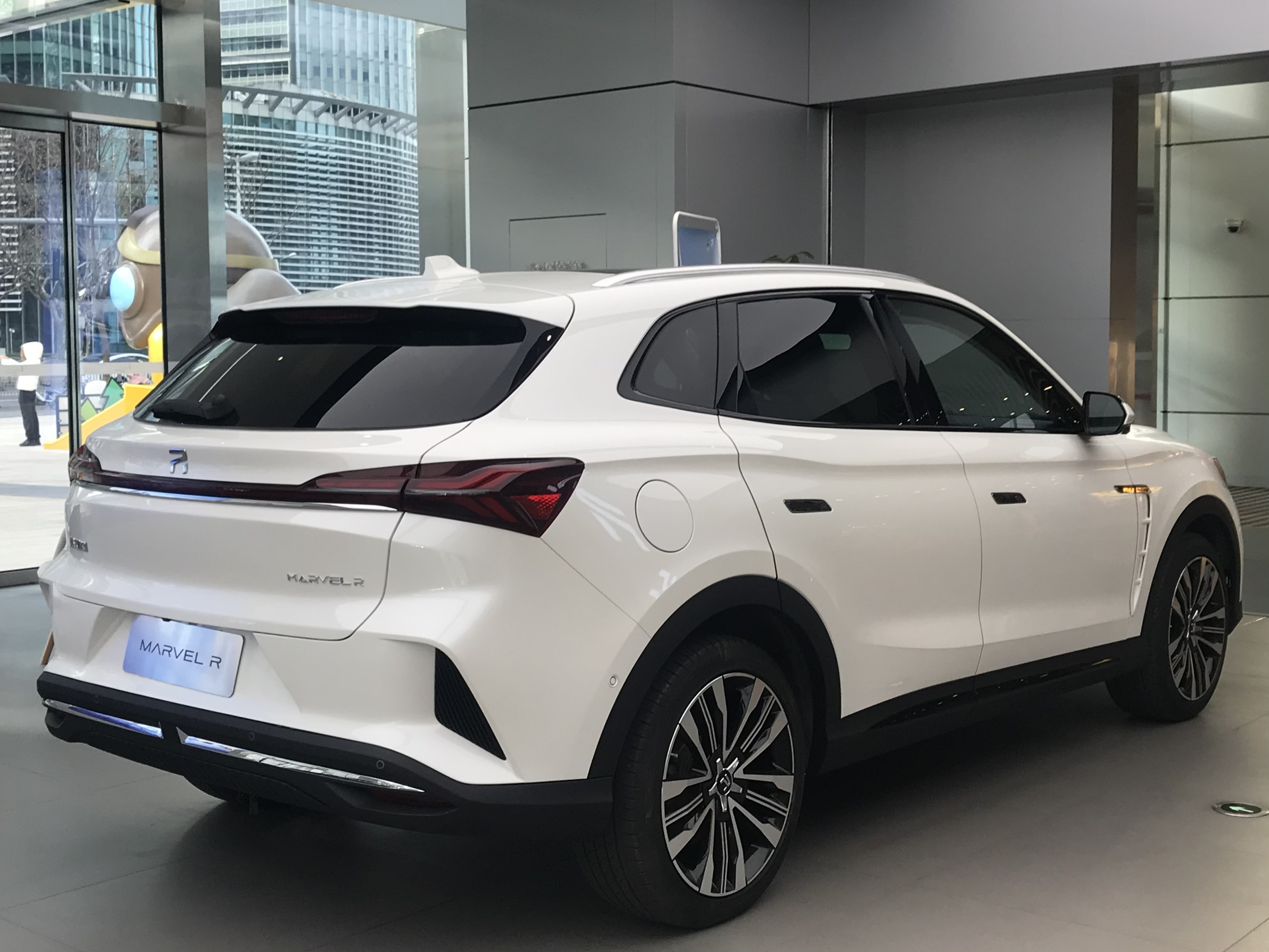
Rear view

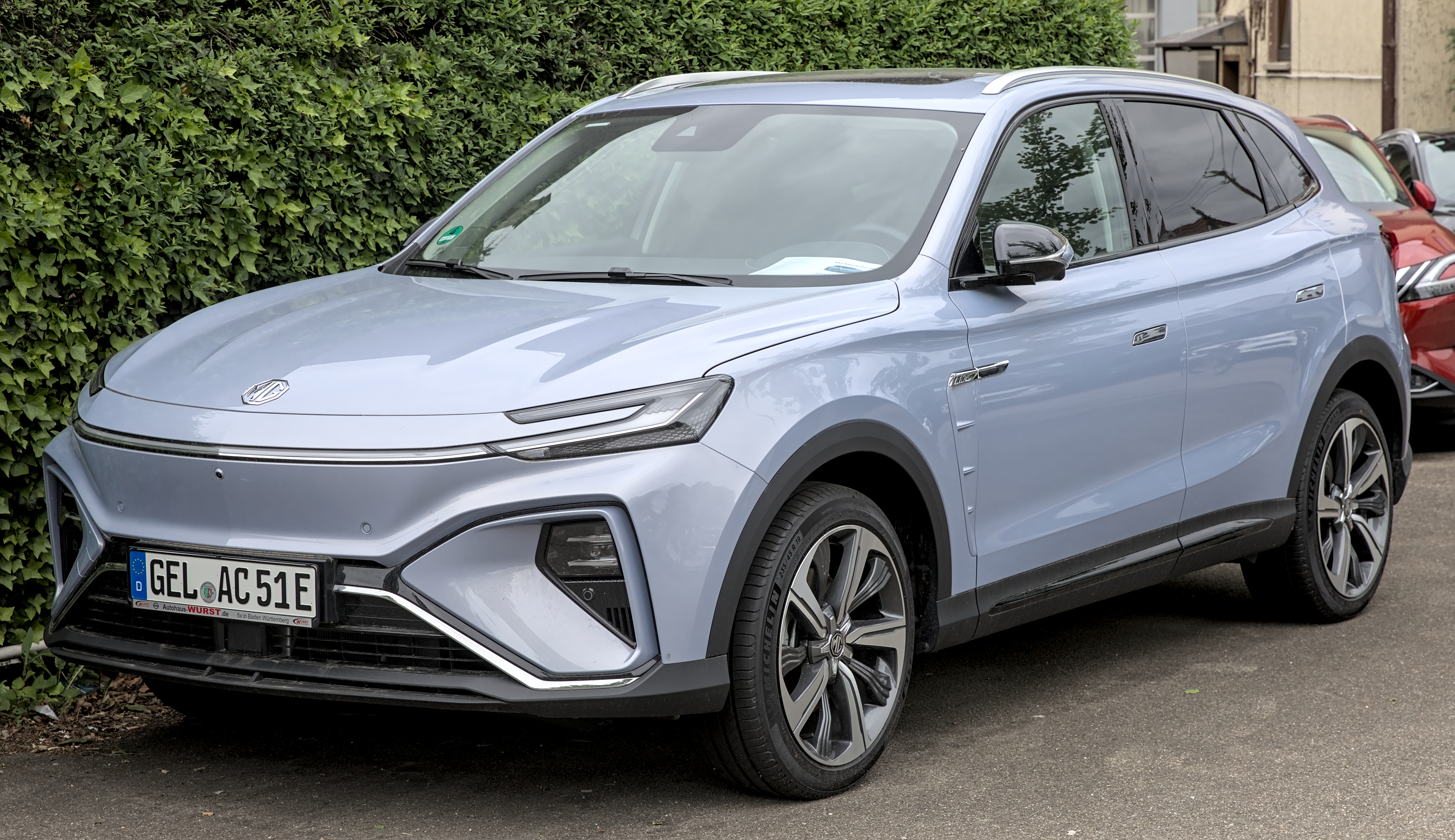
MG Marvel R (Europe)

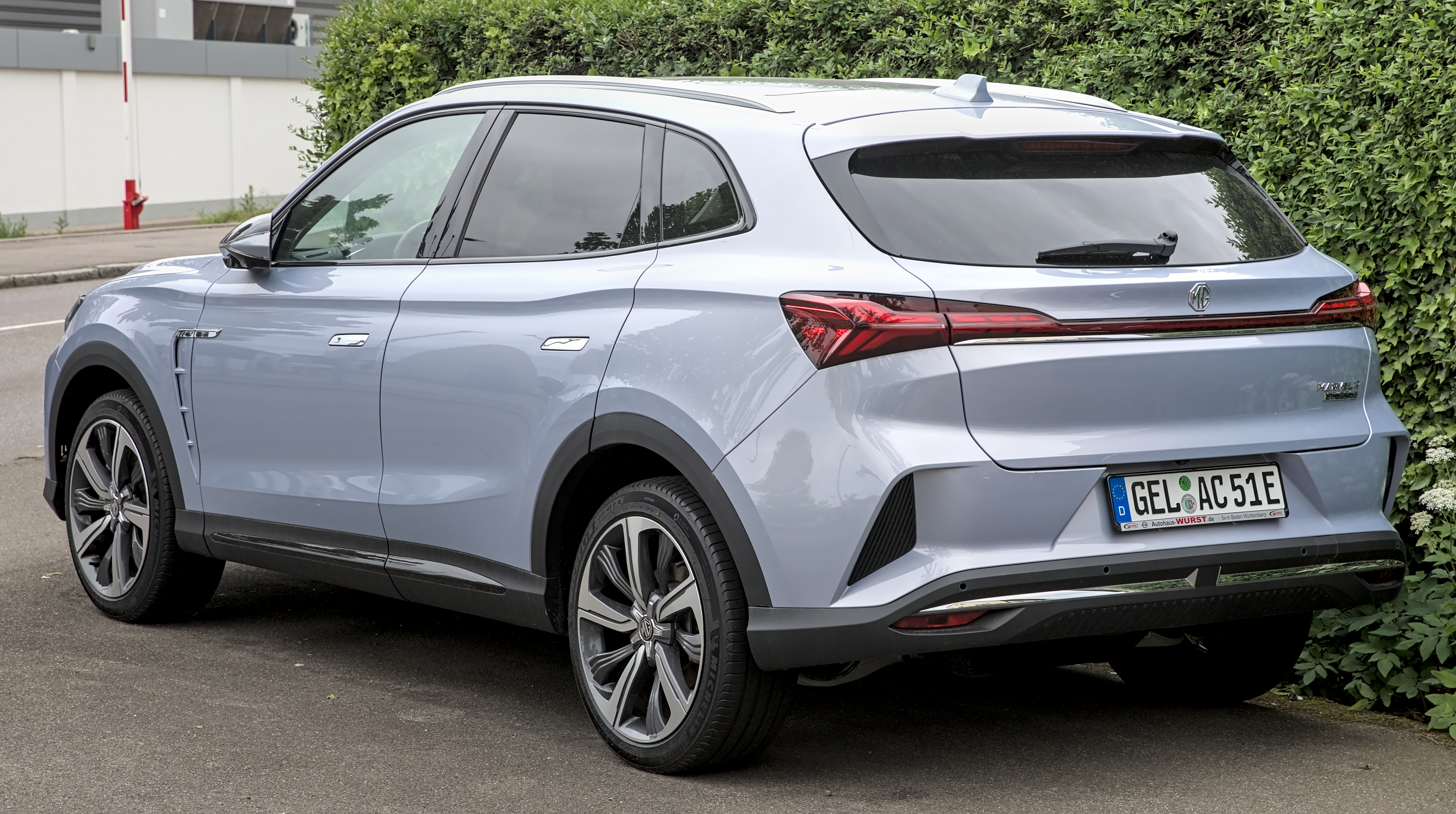
Rear view

=== Safety ===
Euro NCAP test results MG Marvel R (LHD) (2021)
| Test | Points | % |
|---|---|---|
| Overall: | 4 /5 stars | |
| Adult occupant: | 30.6 | 80% |
| Child occupant: | 37 | 75% |
| Pedestrian: | 29.8 | 55% |
| Safety assist: | 12.8 | 80% |
