= Rising Auto =

Chinese electric vehicle brand owned by SAIC Motor

Rising Auto Technology Co., Ltd.
- Formerly: Roewe R (2020–2021); Rising Auto (2021-2024)
- Type: Automotive marque
- Industry: Automotive
- Founded: 2021
- Defunct: 2024 (as independent brand)
- Successor: Roewe
- Headquarters: Shanghai, China
- Area served: China
- Key people: Wu Bing (former CEO)
- Products: Electric vehicles
- Owner: SAIC Motor

Chinese name
- Simplified Chinese: 飞凡汽车科技有限公司
- Hanyu Pinyin: Fēifán Qìchē Kējì Yǒuxiàn Gōngsī
- Website: www.risingauto.com

Rising Auto Technology Co., Ltd., trading as Rising Auto (Chinese: 飞凡汽车, Feifan Auto) was an electric vehicle brand by Chinese automobile manufacturer SAIC Motor. Its predecessor was the Roewe R brand (or R Auto) founded on May 10, 2020. It became an independent operation and changed its name to its Rising Auto in November 2021. It ended its independent operation in October 2024 and became a high-end product line under Roewe.

== History ==
=== R Model Line ===
In January 2020, the compact, fully electric sedan Roewe R ER6 was presented as the first car to power a new model line within the Roewe brand SAIC Motor concern. The vehicle was created as a twin variant of the Roewe i6 Max, differing from it in the appearance of the front fascia with the centrally placed "R" brand logo, as well as a remodeled dashboard. In November 2020, the R model line was expanded with the SUV-a Marvel R, which, like the ER6 model, was created as a modernized version of the already offered Roewe model, the electric SUV Marvel X. The vehicle received extensive visual modifications both inside and out. It was promoted as the first passenger car equipped with 5G technology..

=== Brand ===
In March 2021, SAIC Motor SAIC decided to separate the "R" model line from the Roewe structure, creating a new, separate brand R focused exclusively on luxury electric cars. Its inauguration was accompanied by the presentation of the R ES33 Concept study model, which was a preview of the production model with a debut scheduled for 2022. In November 2021, SAIC Motor SAIC changed its brand name from "R" to Rising Auto, now promoting itself in its native Chinese as "Feifan". Already under the new brand, in 2022, as announced, a new model will debut – the electric SUV Coupe Rising R7, and at the end of the same year the company withdrew from its two oldest products to focus exclusively on next-generation vehicles. In early 2023, the lineup was complemented by a higher-class sedan, the Rising F7, and right after this debut, the company introduced the battery replacement system using dedicated stations, already used by the competitor Nio.

== Products ==
=== Current models ===
- Rising Auto F7 (2023–present), mid-size sedan, BEV
- Rising Auto R7 (2022–present), mid-size coupe SUV, BEV
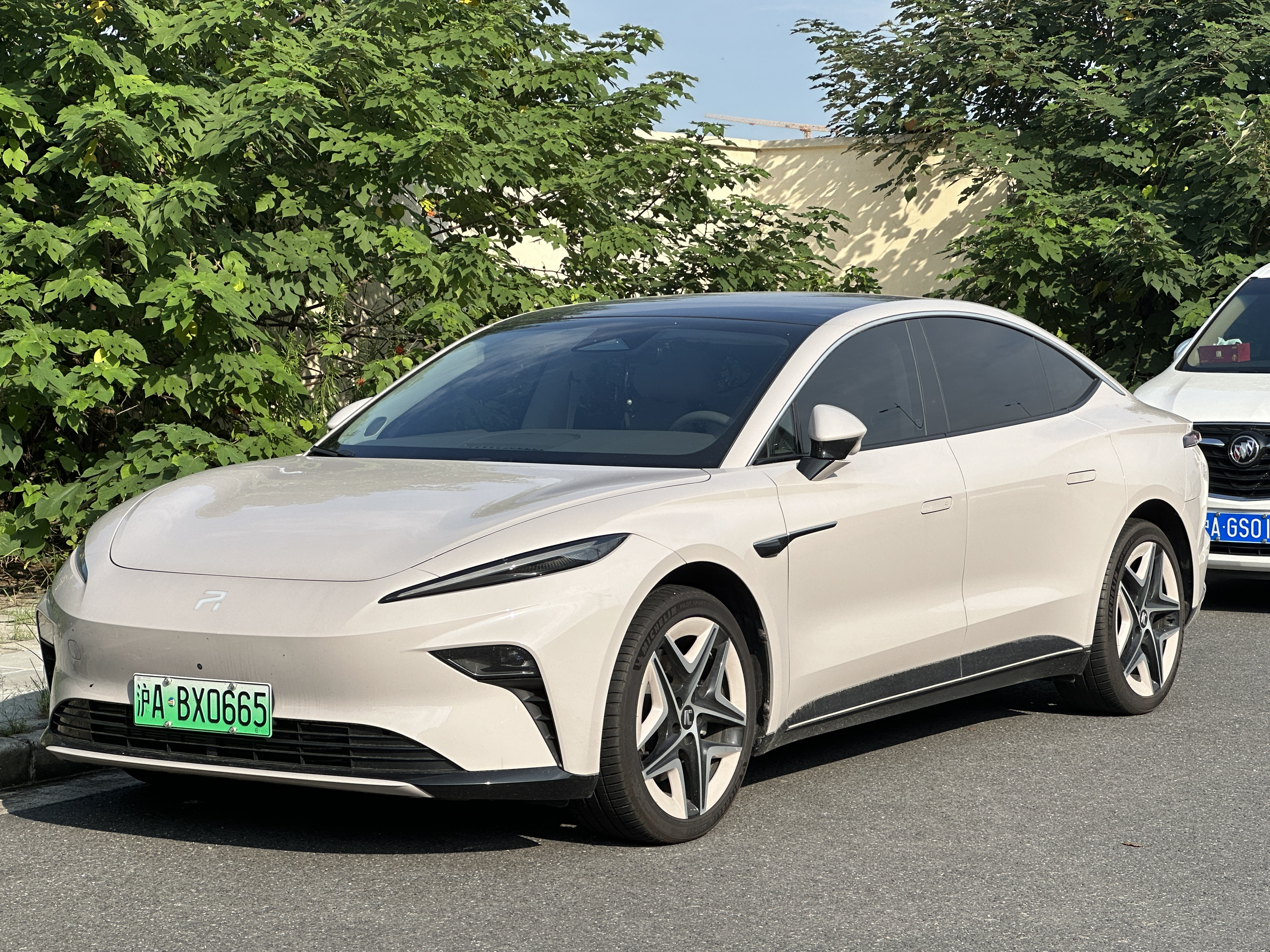
Rising Auto F7

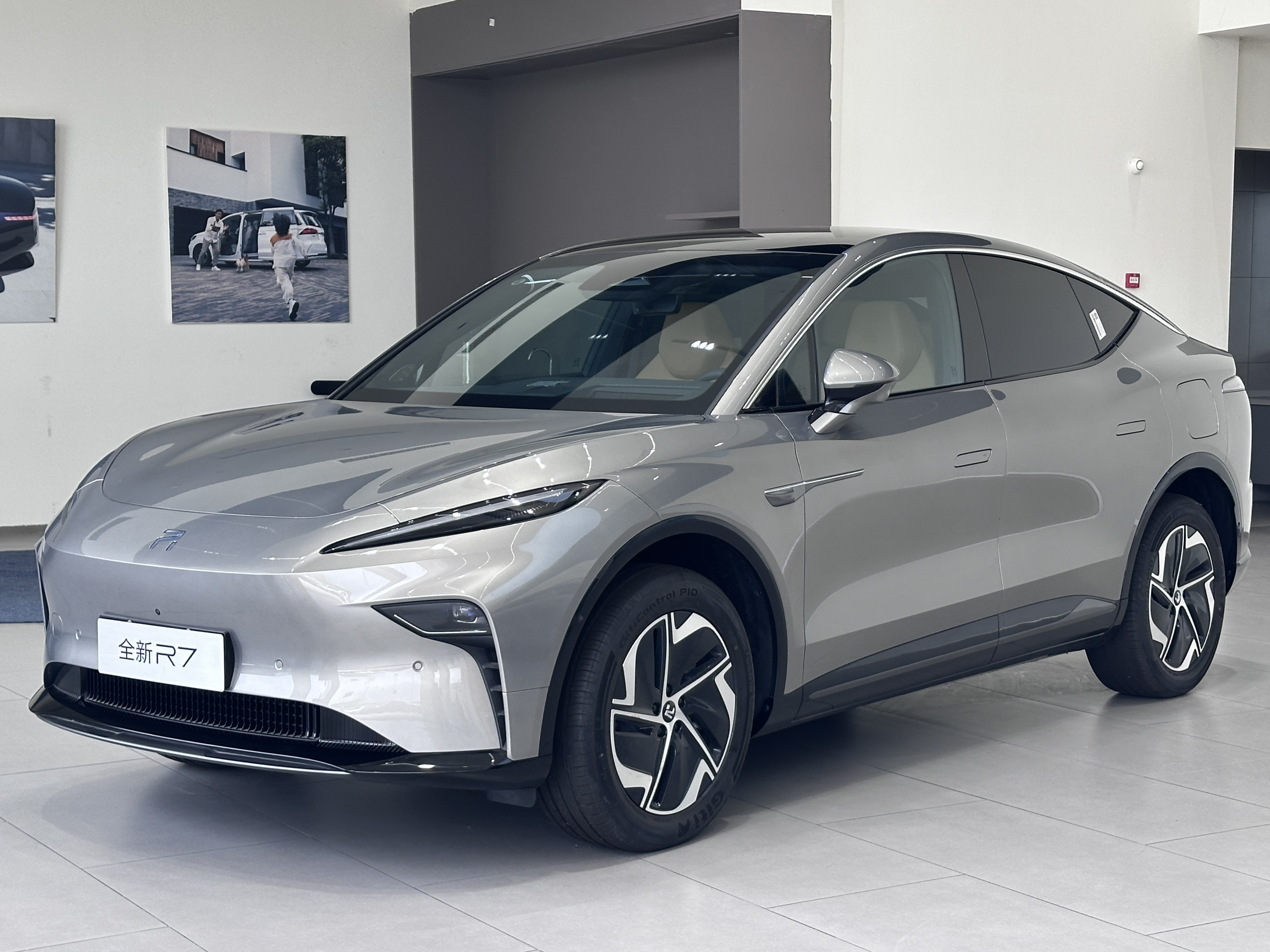
Rising Auto R7 facelift

=== Discontinued models ===
- Rising Auto ER6 (2020–2022), compact car, rebadged Roewe Ei6.
- Rising Auto Marvel R (2020–2022), compact SUV, rebadged Roewe Marvel X.
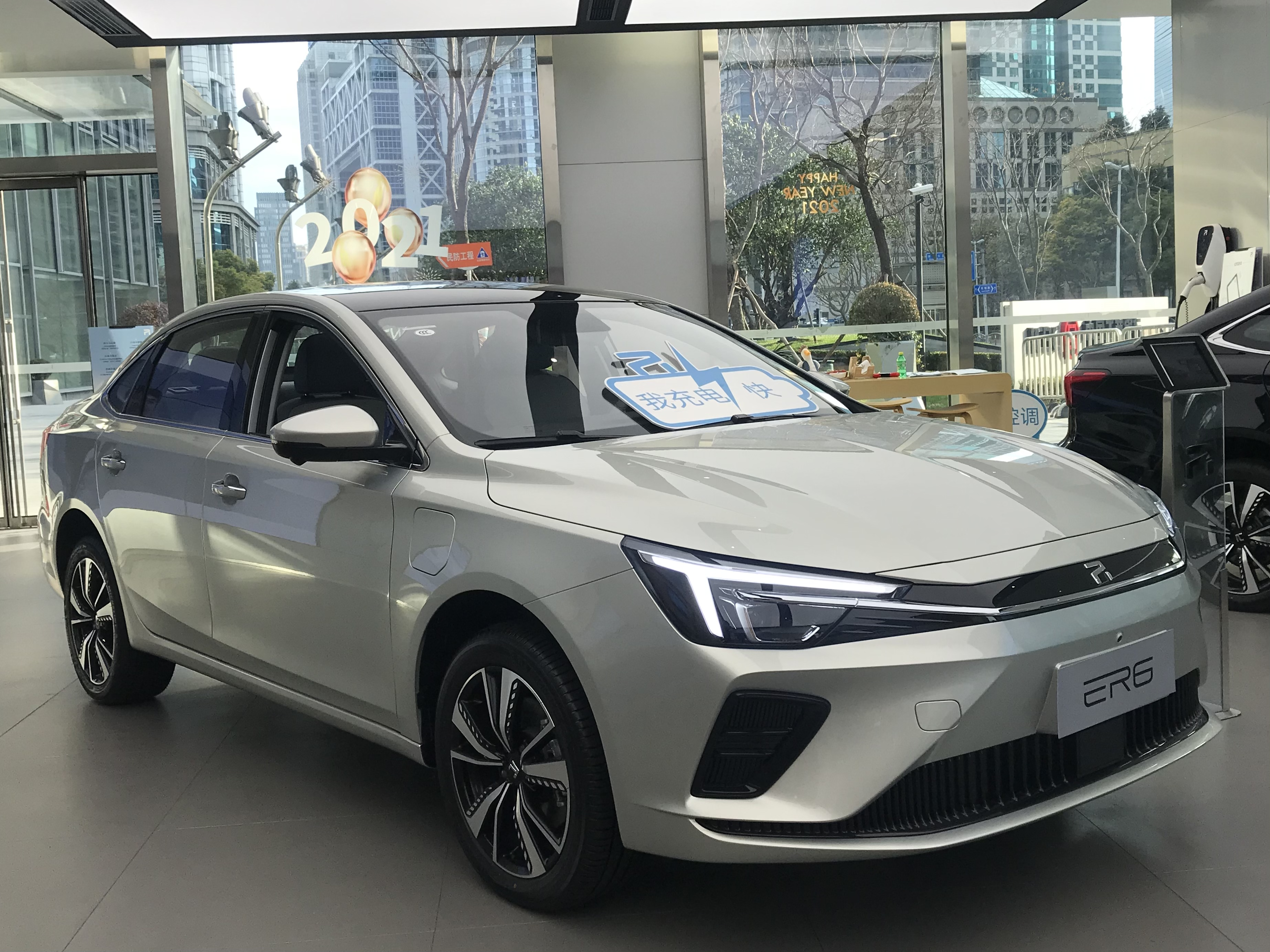
Rising Auto ER6

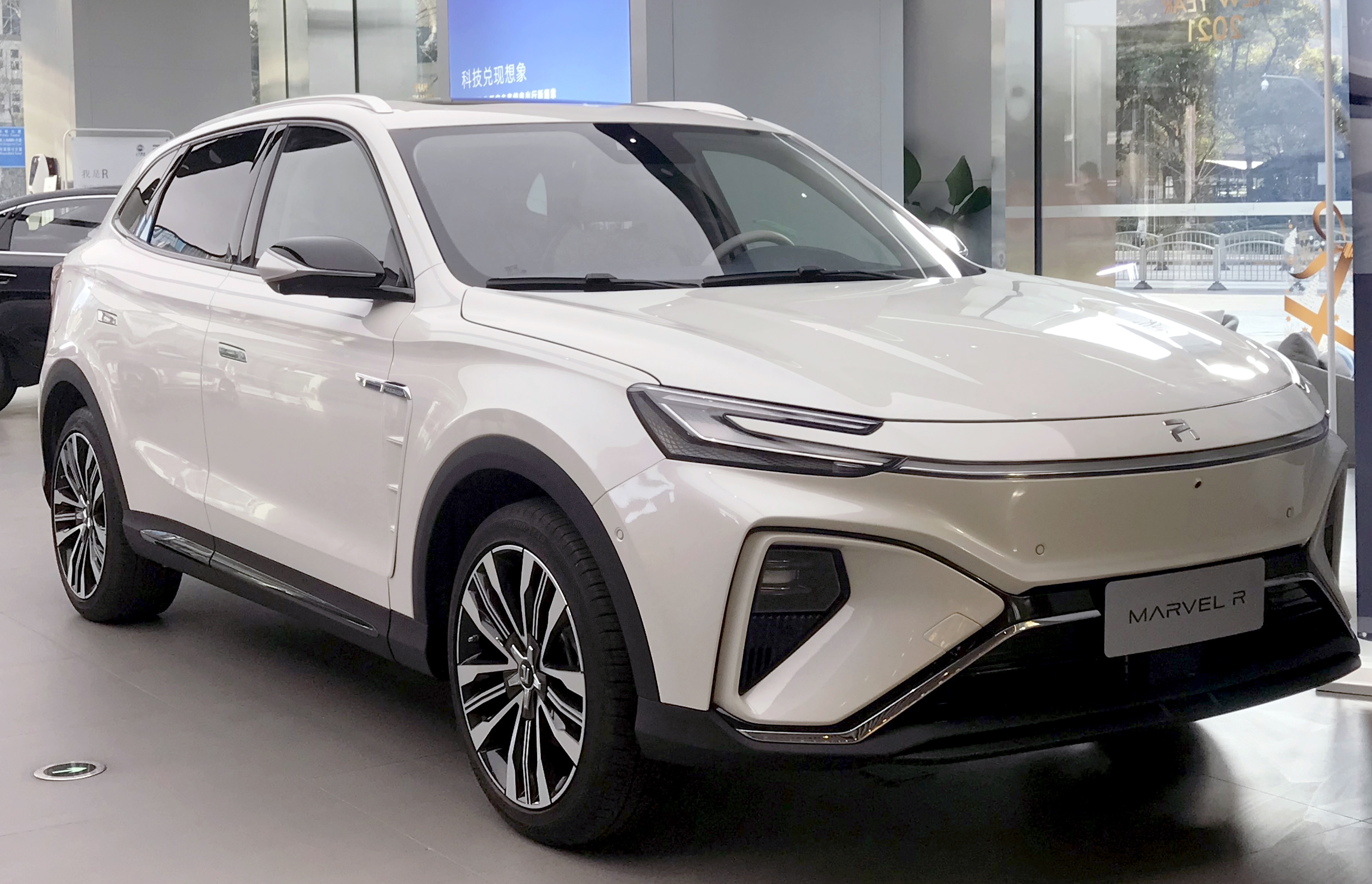
Rising Auto Marvel R

=== Concept vehicles ===
Rising Auto has revealed the following concept cars:

- Rising Auto Marvel R Concept
- Rising Auto ES33 Concept
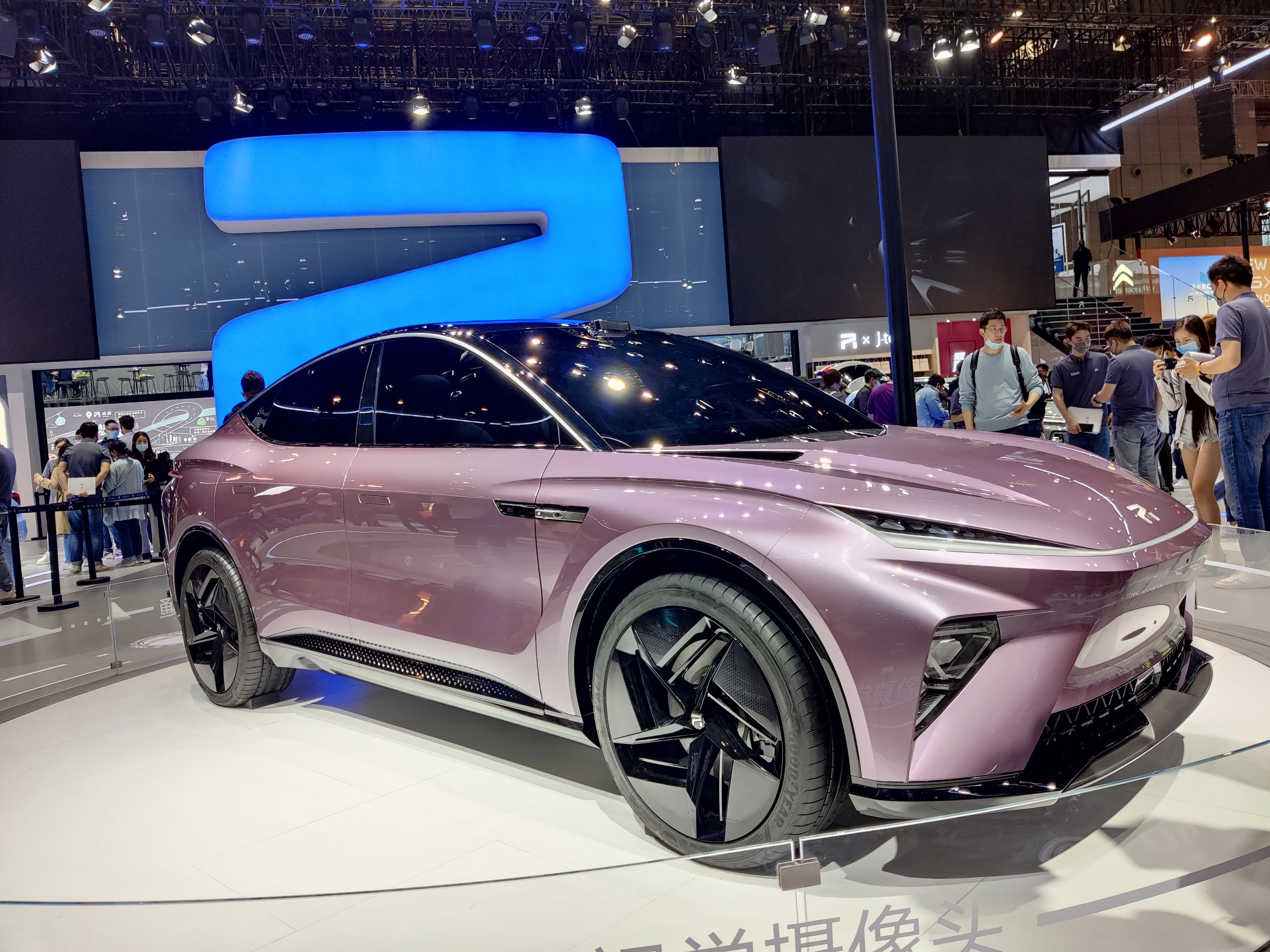
Rising Auto ES33 Concept

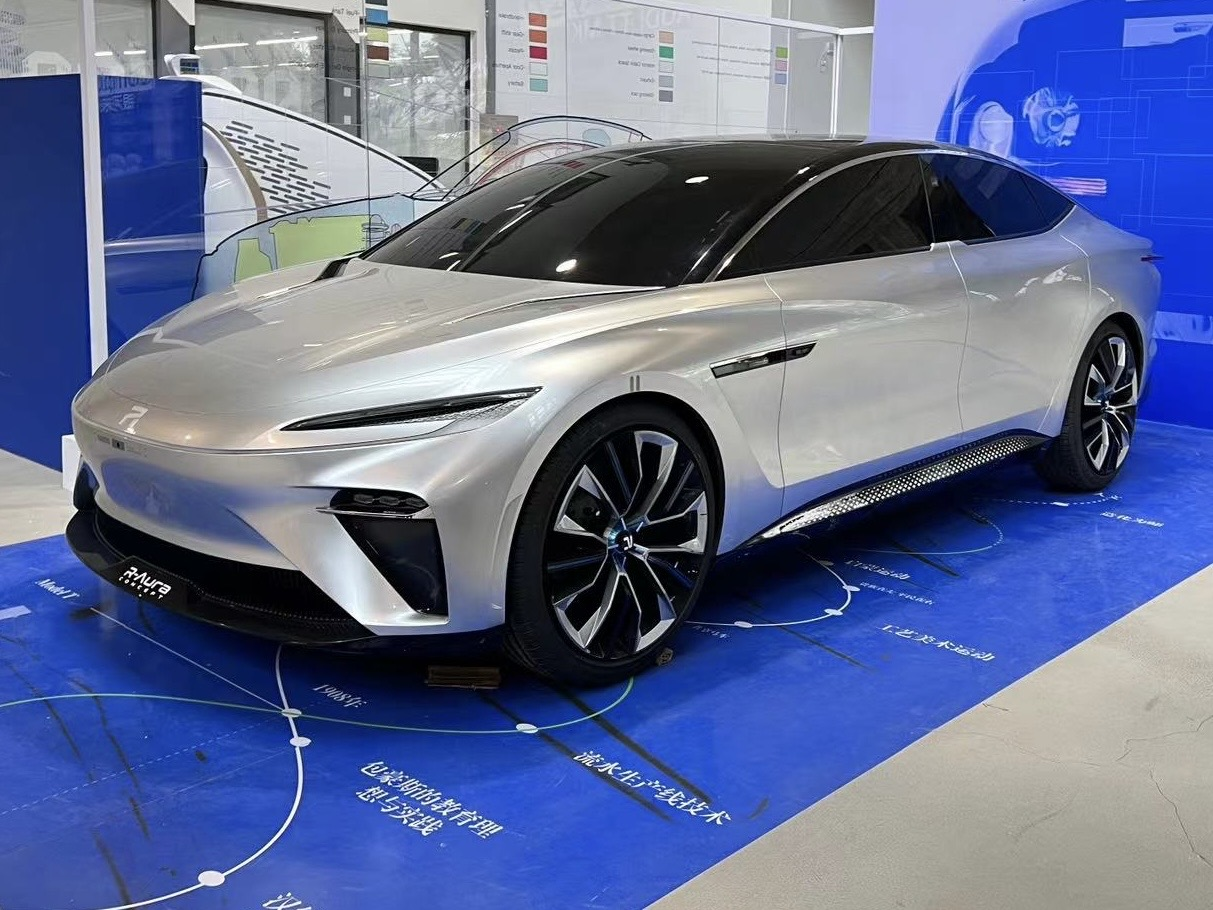
Rising Auto R-Aura Concept

== See also ==
- Automobile manufacturers and brands of China
- List of automobile manufacturers of China
