= MG One =

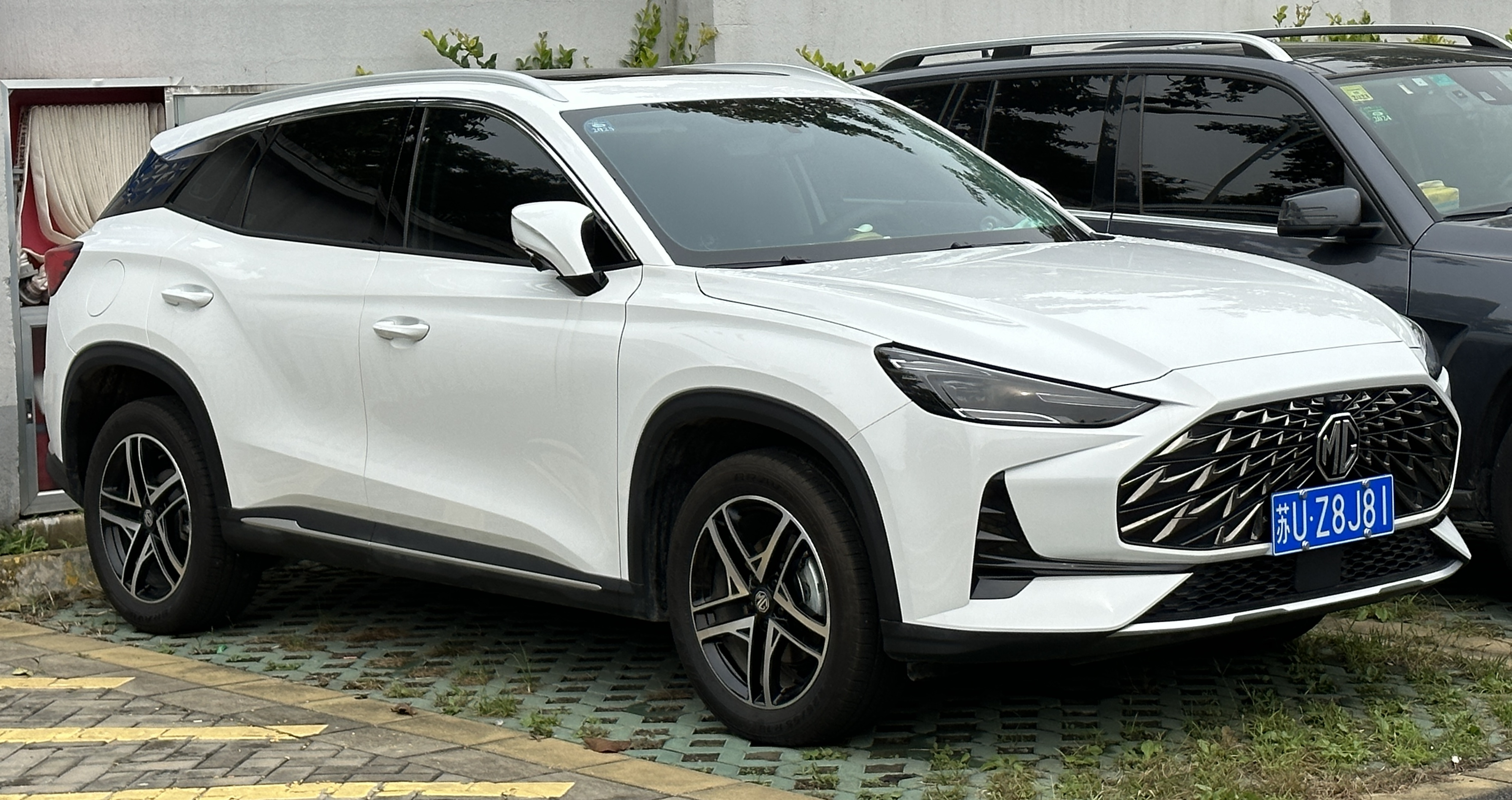
- MG One α

Overview
- Manufacturer: SAIC Motor
- Model code: AS32
- Production: 2021–2025 (China); 2021–present (export)
- Model years: 2022–present

Body and chassis
- Class: Compact crossover SUV
- Body style: 5-door SUV
- Layout: Front-engine, front-wheel-drive
- Platform: SIGMA architecture

Powertrain
- Engine: 1.5 L 15C4E SGE turbo I4
- Transmission: CVT

Dimensions
- Wheelbase: 2,670 mm (105.1 in)
- Length: 4,581 mm (180.4 in)
- Width: 1,871 mm (73.7 in)
- Height: 1,601–1,617 mm (63.0–63.7 in)
- Kerb weight: 1,470–1,515 kg (3,240.8–3,340.0 lb)

Chronology
- Predecessor: MG RX5 (Philippines)

The MG One (stylised as ONE) is a compact crossover SUV manufactured by SAIC Motor and marketed under the MG marque.

== Overview ==
The MG One was released on 30 July 2021. Its styling adopts the "third-generation family design" of MG, and it is the first vehicle built above the SIGMA architecture. Two versions are available with the α version as the sportier variant and the β version as the high tech variant, the variants are differentiated with slight styling differences.

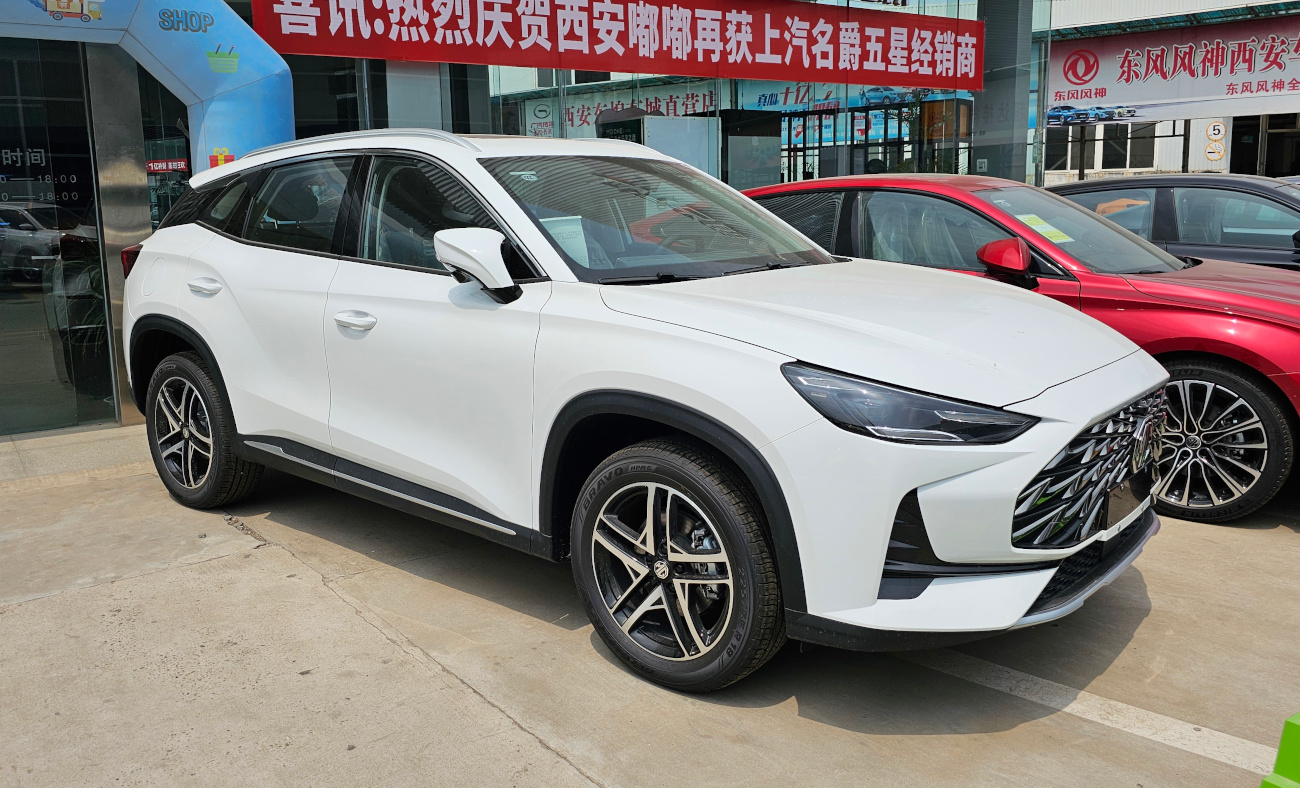
MG One α (front)

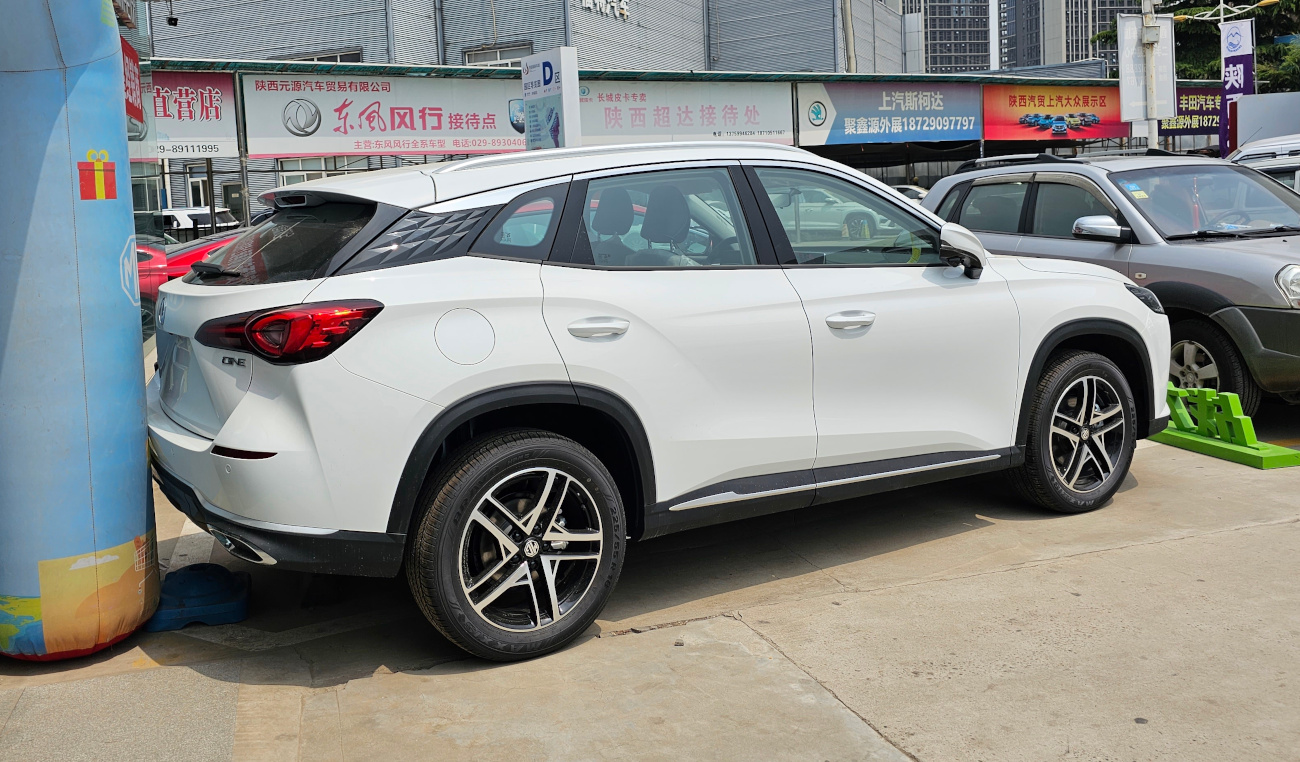
MG One α (rear)

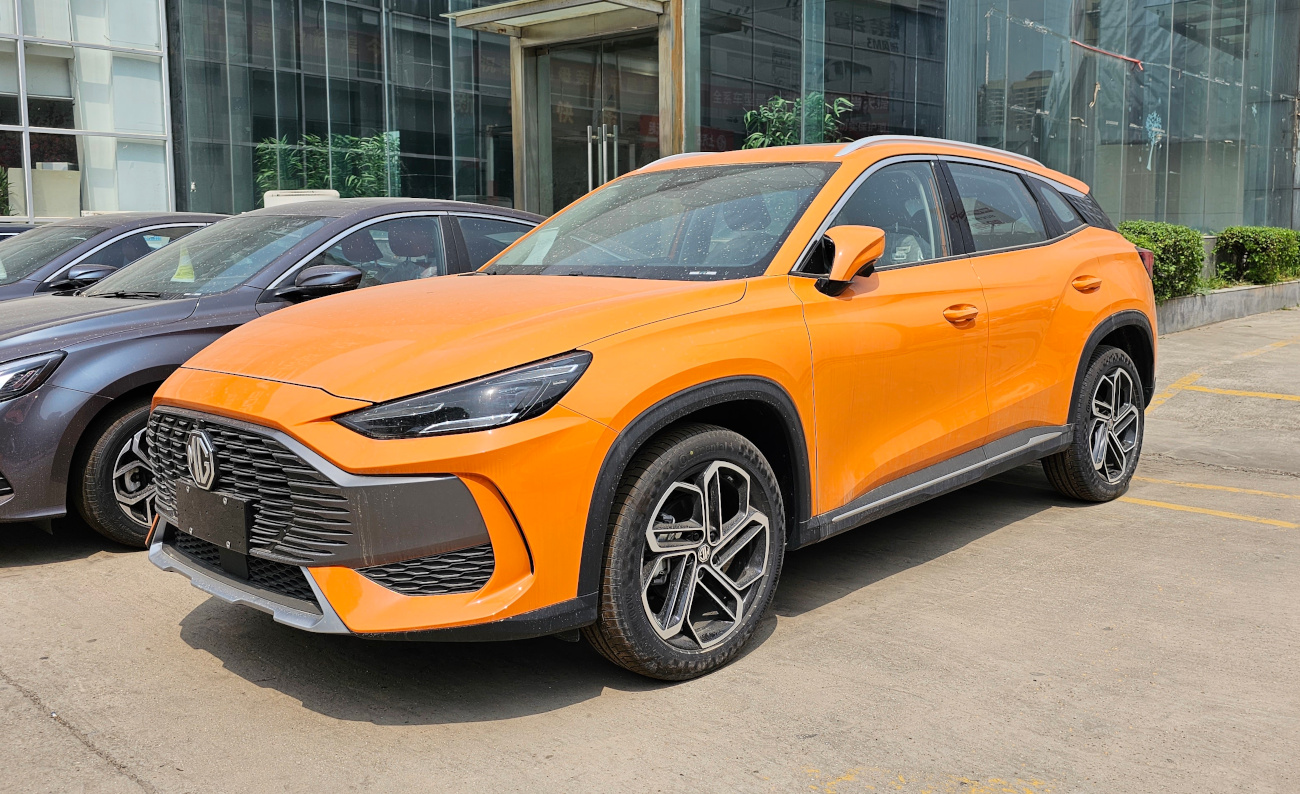
MG One β (front)

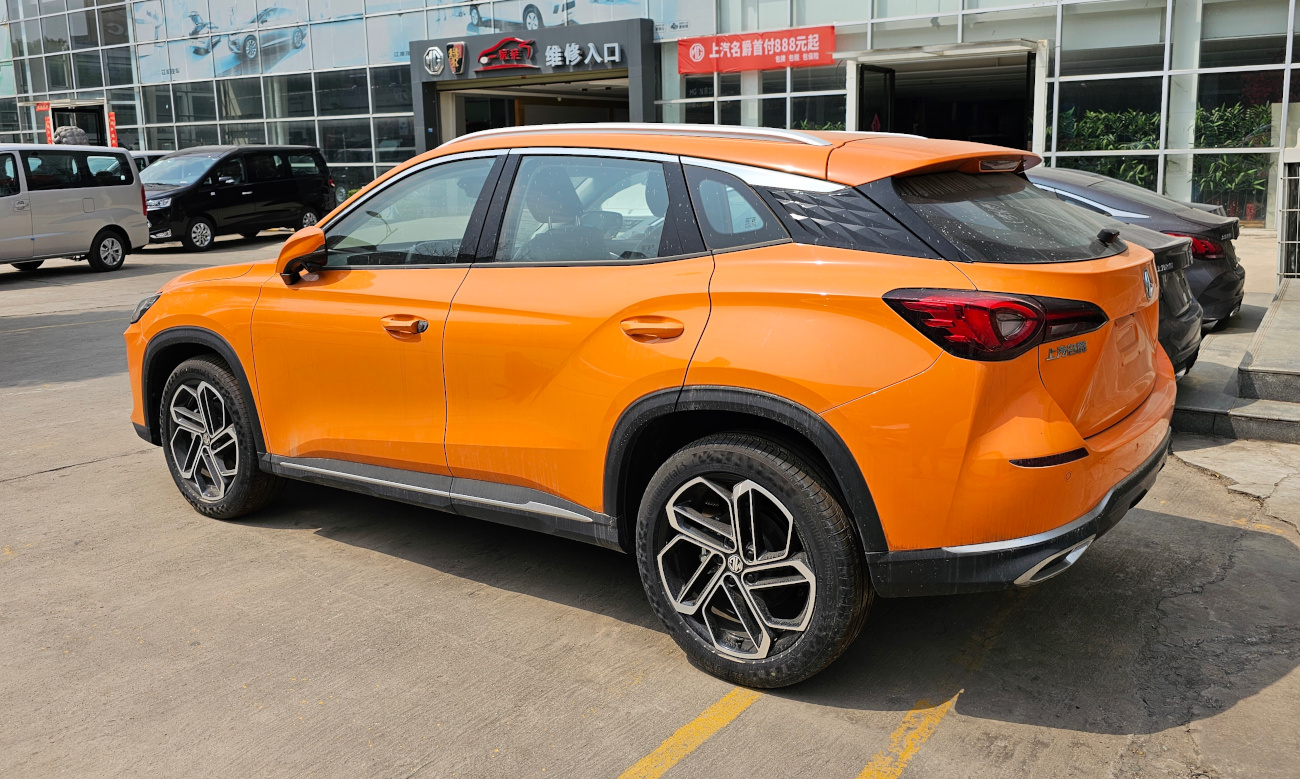
MG One β (rear)

=== Powertrain ===
The MG One is equipped with the 15C4E 1.5-litre turbocharged engine with a maximum output of 133 kW (181 PS; 178 hp).

Specs
Model	Years	Engine	Transmission	Power	Torque	0–100 km/h (0–62 mph) (Official)	Top speed
One	2021–present	1.5L Turbo I4	CVT	133 kW (181 PS; 178 hp) at 5,600 rpm	285 N⋅m (210 lb⋅ft) at 1,500–4,000 rpm	8.8s	195 km/h (121 mph)
