= Independent director =

External member of a governing body

An independent director (also sometimes known as an outside director) is a member of a board of directors who does not have a material or pecuniary relationship with company or related persons, except sitting fees. In the United States, independent outsiders make up 66% of all boards and 72% of S&P 500 company boards, according to The Wall Street Journal.

== Legal requirements ==
=== India ===
In India as of 2017, a majority of the minimum three directors of public companies having share capital in excess of Rs. 100 million (Rs 100,000,000) should be independent. Clause 49 of the listing agreements defines independent directors as follows:

"For the purpose of this clause the expression 'independent directors' means directors who apart from receiving director's remuneration, do not have any other material pecuniary relationship or transactions with the company, its promoters, its management or its subsidiaries, which in judgment of the board may affect independence of judgment of the directors."

The Companies Act, 2013, most sections of which got implemented from 1 April 2014, has mandated all listed public companies to have at least one-third of the total Directors to be independent. Whereas in the case of unlisted public companies, the following class of companies shall have at least two directors as independent directors:

(i) Public Companies having paid up share capital of Ten Crore rupees or more; or (ii) Public Companies having turnover of One Hundred Crore rupees or more; or (iii) Public Companies which have, in aggregate, outstanding loans, debentures and deposits exceeding 50 Crore rupees or more.

The Companies Act, 2013 is drafted taking into consideration the noteworthy inputs and contribution that an Independent Director can bring in to the business. Section 149(6) of the act stipulates the criteria for a candidate that ensures highest standards of integrity, while also preventing any conflict of interest. The provisions seek to ensure the autonomy of the appointee to facilitate effective discharge of duties such as upholding shareholders' interest, upholding corporate governance standards, among others. The compensation offered to such Independent Directors in the form of "sitting fee" has also been increased from Rs. 20,000 (prescribed by Companies Act, 1956) to a maximum of Rs. 1,00,000/- per meeting.

=== Kenya ===
The requirements in Kenya are similar to those in India. These are to be found in the Companies Act, Cap 486, Laws of Kenya.<George Kinyua, LL.B>

=== United States ===
The NYSE and Nasdaq stock exchange standards for independent directors are similar. Both require that "a majority of the boards of director of a listed company be 'independent'". Both allow compensation for directors of $120,000/year or less (as of August 2008).

The NYSE states:

"no director qualifies as 'independent' unless the board of directors affirmatively determines that the director has 'no material relationship' with the listed company, either directly or as a partner, shareholder or officer of an organization that has a relationship with the company."

Nasdaq's rules say that an independent director must not be an officer or employee of the company or its subsidiaries or any other individual having a relationship that, in the opinion of the company's board of directors, would interfere with the exercise of independent judgment in carrying out the responsibilities of a director.

According to the Conference Board, "other than delisting a company ... there really is no penalty" by the stock exchanges or the SEC for not having enough independent directors.

== Benefits and challenges ==
Ballini in 2020 argued that independent directors played an important role in planning and delivering succession to the next generation in family businesses.

Some researchers have complained that firms have appointed "independent directors who are overly sympathetic to management, while still technically independent according to regulatory definitions."

One complaint against the independence regulations is that CEOs may find loopholes to influence directors. While the NYSE has a $1 million limit on business dealing between directors and the firm, this does not include charitable contributions. Two critics of management influence over boards note that "a director who is an officer or employee of a charitable organization can still be considered independent even if the firm on whose board the director sits contributes more than $1 million to that organization".

== See also ==
- Non-executive director
