= SAIC Rising F7 =

Battery electric executive sedan

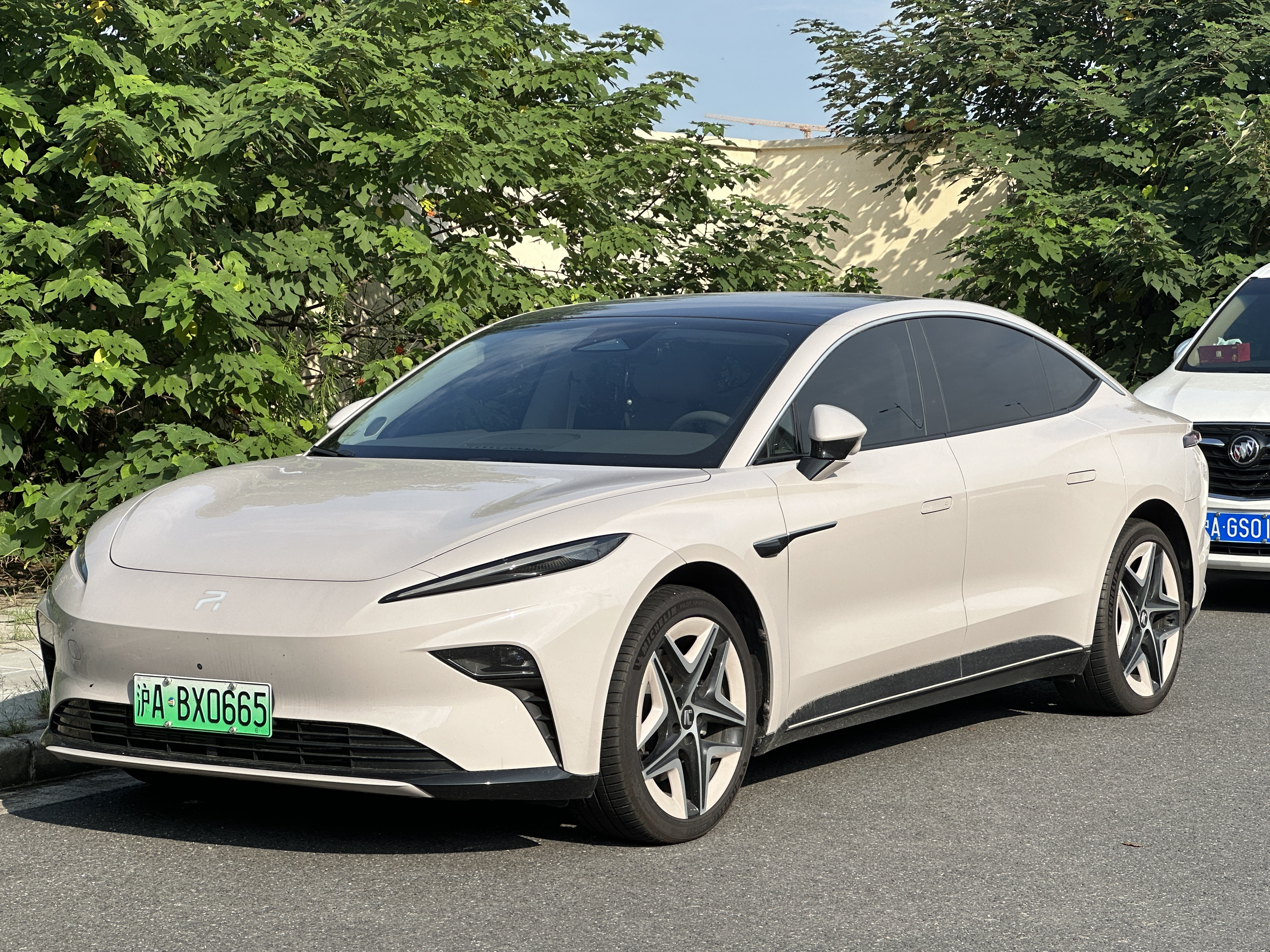
- SAIC Rising F7 in Shanghai

Overview
- Manufacturer: Rising Auto (SAIC Motor)
- Model code: EP35
- Also called: MG9 EV (prototype)
- Production: 2022–present
- Model years: 2023–present
- Assembly: China: Nanjing
- Designer: Karming Chan

Body and chassis
- Class: Executive car (E)
- Body style: 5-door liftback
- Layout: Rear-motor, rear-wheel-drive; Dual-motor, all-wheel-drive
- Related: SAIC Rising R7

Powertrain
- Electric motor: Permanent magnet AC synchronous
- Power output: 340 hp (250 kW) (RWD); 544 hp (406 kW) (AWD)
- Battery: 64 kWh LFP; 77 kWh NMC; 90 kWh NMC
- Electric range: 576–666 km (358–414 mi) (CLTC)

Dimensions
- Wheelbase: 3,000 mm (118.1 in)
- Length: 5,000 mm (196.9 in)
- Width: 1,953 mm (76.9 in)
- Height: 1,494 mm (58.8 in)
- Curb weight: 2,180 kg (4,806 lb)

The SAIC Rising F7 (also known as Feifan F7) is a battery electric executive car produced by Chinese automobile manufacturer SAIC Motor under the Rising Auto brand. It is the second product of the brand, and was launched in March 2023.

== Overview ==
The design of the Rising Auto F7 was first previewed by the 2020 Roewe R-Aura Concept from before the Rising Auto brand was launched. The production sedan was presented at the 2023 Auto Shanghai.

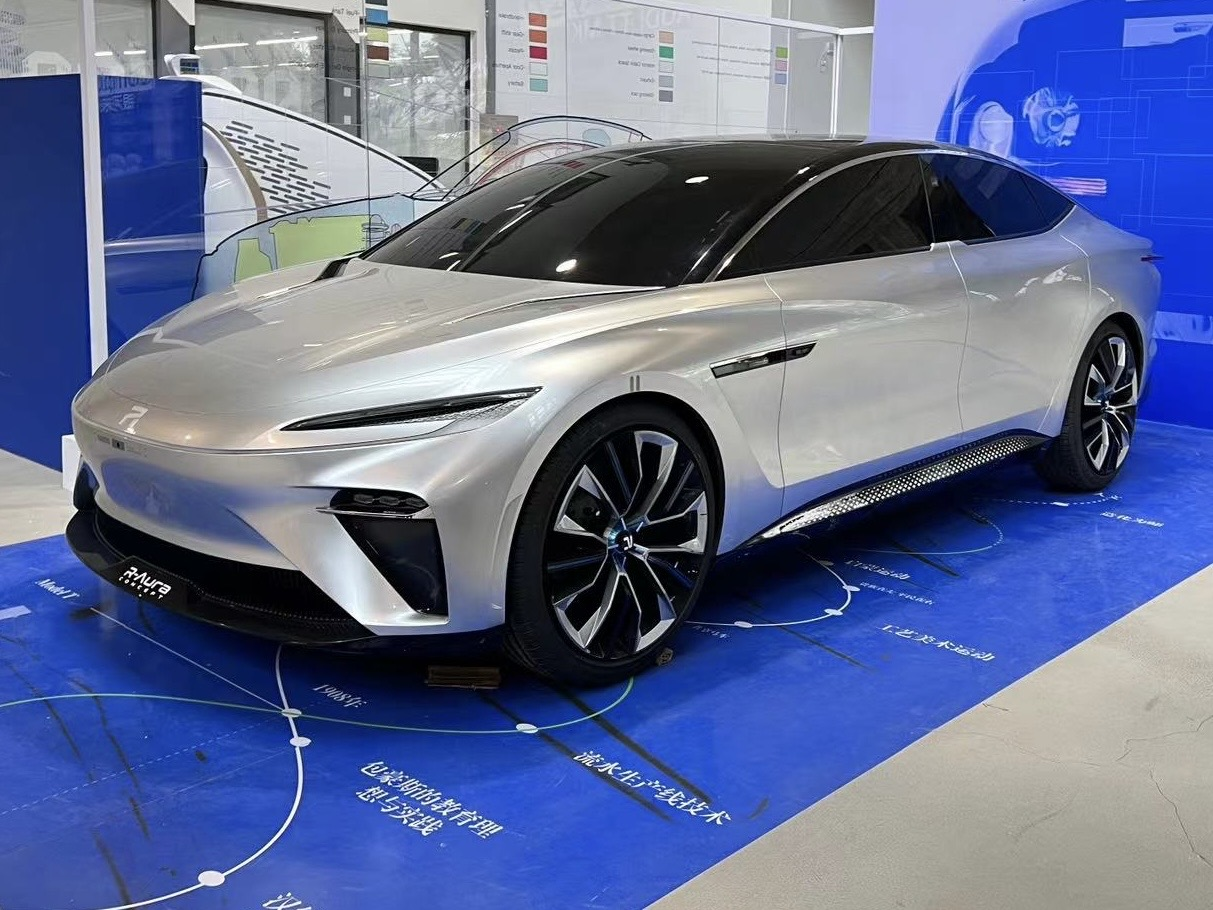
Roewe R-Aura Concept

The Rising Auto F7 is an electric sedan with a drag coefficient of 0.206 Cd and supports battery swap technology. The interior features the Rising OS infotainment system powered by a Qualcomm Snapdragon 8155 chip and features a 43-inch screen in the interior, including a combination of a LCD instrument screen, an OLED center console display, and a screen for the copilot.

The Rising F7 is available as a rear-wheel-drive entry model with a 64 kWh LFP battery and an electric motor producing 340 hp (254 kW; 345 PS) and 450 N⋅m (332 lb⋅ft) of torque. Higher trims using the same motor with a 77 kWh NMC battery for a CLTC range of 576 kilometres (358 mi) and a 90 kWh battery for a range of 666 kilometres (414 mi) are also available. The top of the trim model features the same battery and two electric motors producing a combined 544 hp (406 kW; 552 PS) and 700 N⋅m (516 lb⋅ft) of torque capable of a 0–100 km/h (62 mph) acceleration time of 3.7 seconds and a range of 600 kilometres (373 mi). The batteries of the F7 are supplied by the United Auto Battery System (UABS), a joint venture between SAIC and CATL.

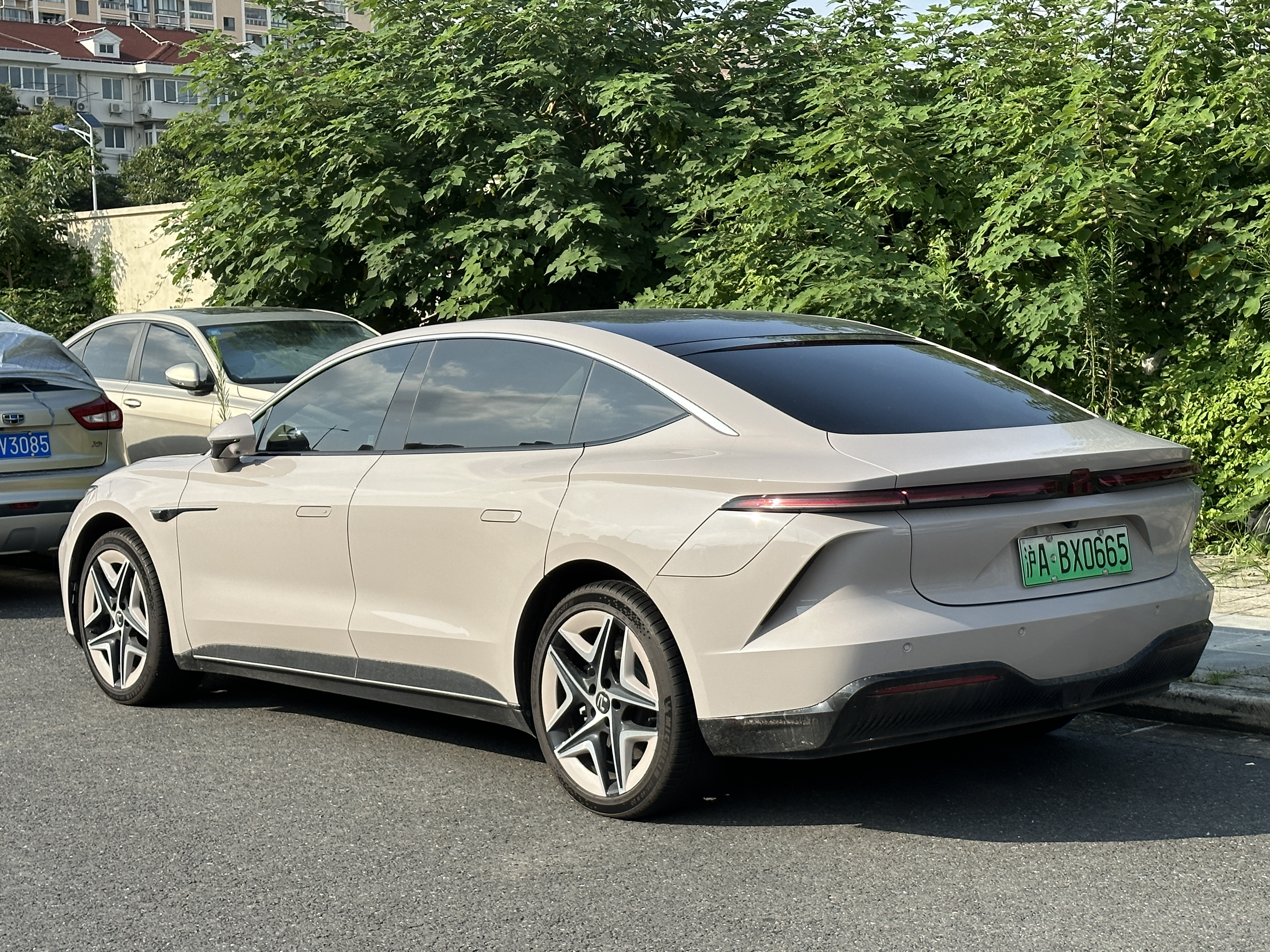
Rear view

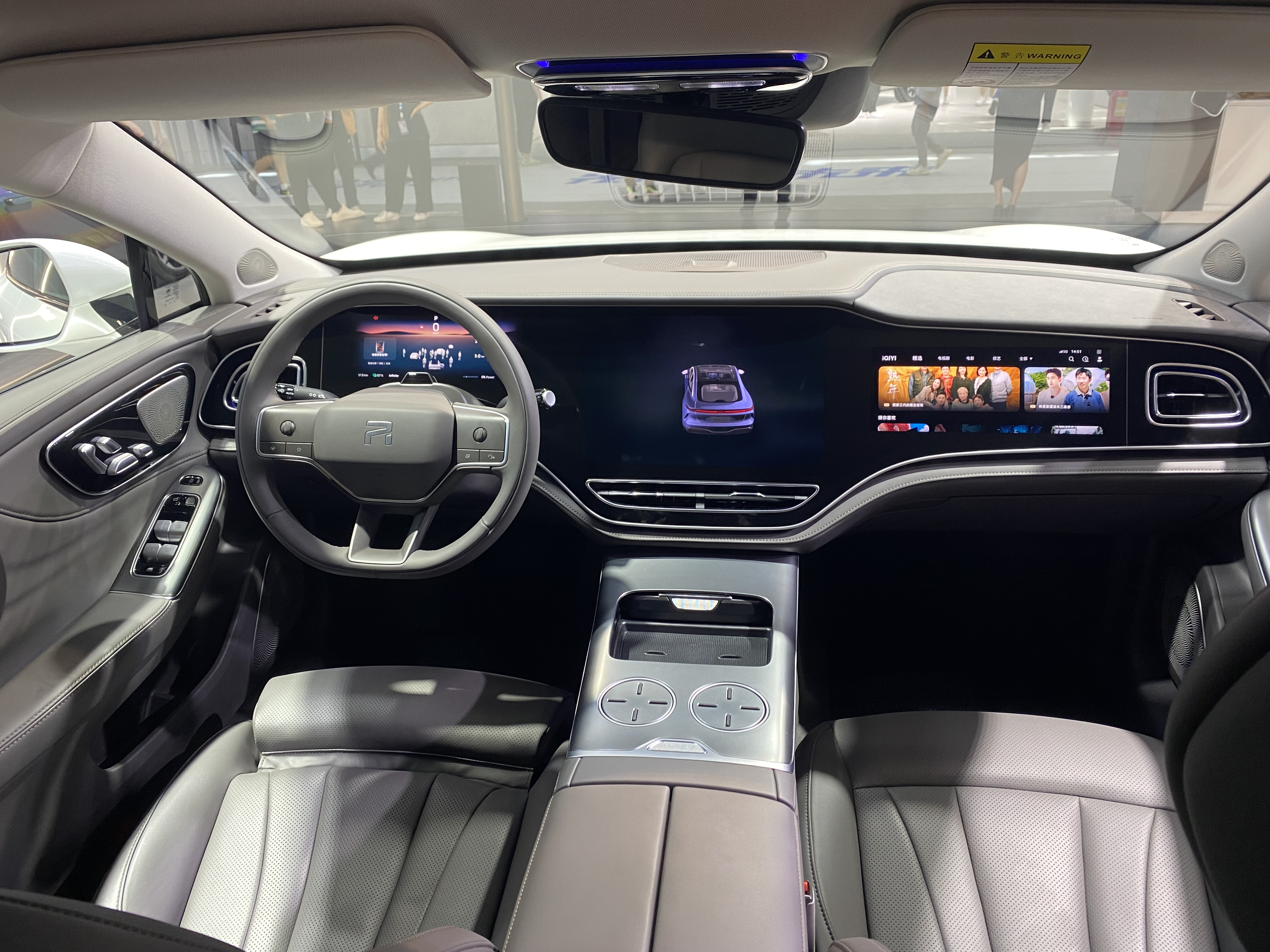
Interior

== Overseas markets ==
The car was showcased by MG Motor at the 2024 Geneva International Motor Show as the MG9 EV.

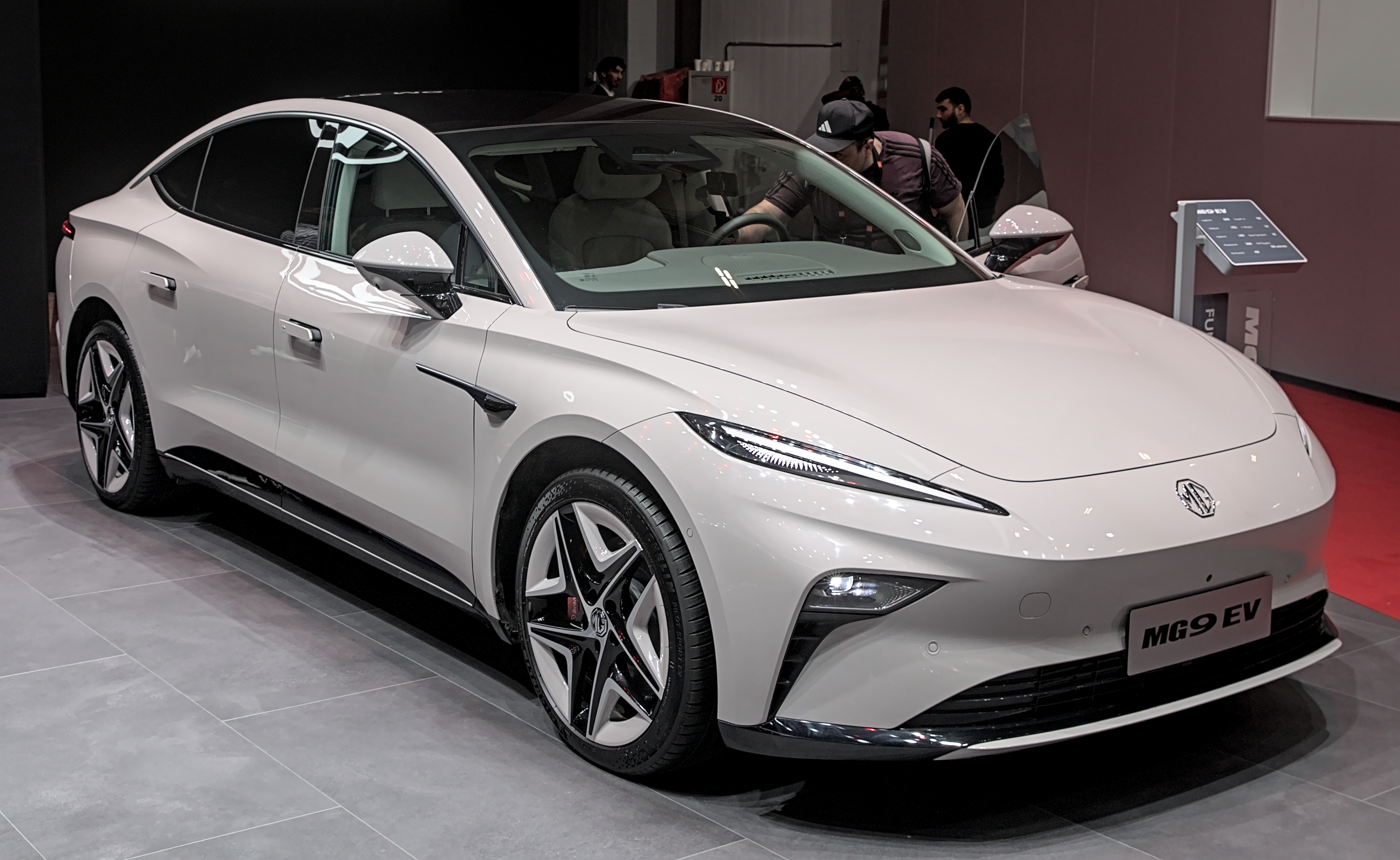
MG9 EV

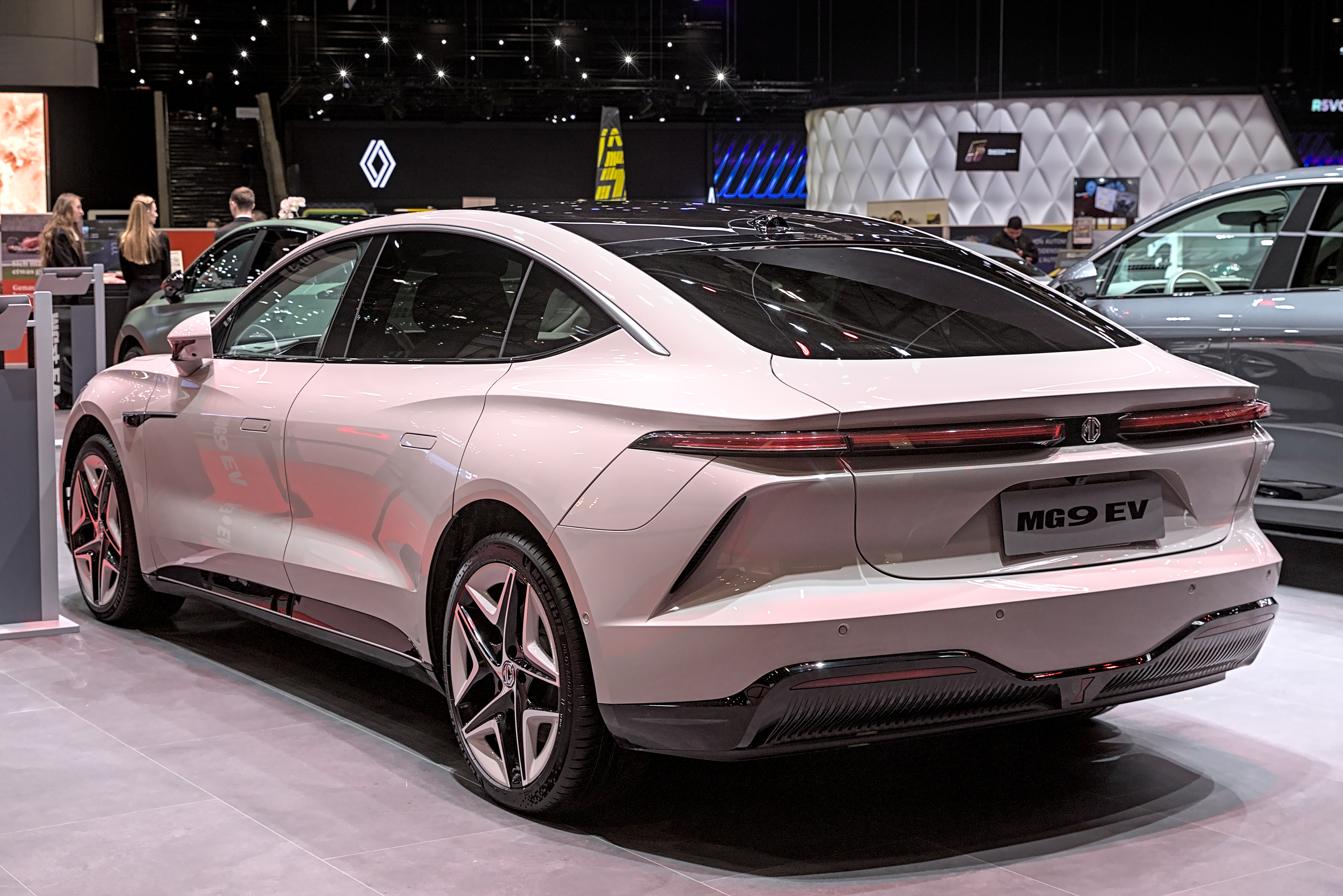
Rear view

== Safety ==
C-NCAP (2021) test results 2023 Rising F7 Advanced
Category		%
Overall:	5 /5 stars	90.8%
Occupant protection:		94.86%
Vulnerable road users:		70.05%
Active safety:		93.58%

== Sales ==
Year	China
2023	10,389
2024	3,762
2025	2,552
