= SAIC Rising R7 =

Battery electric mid-size crossover SUV

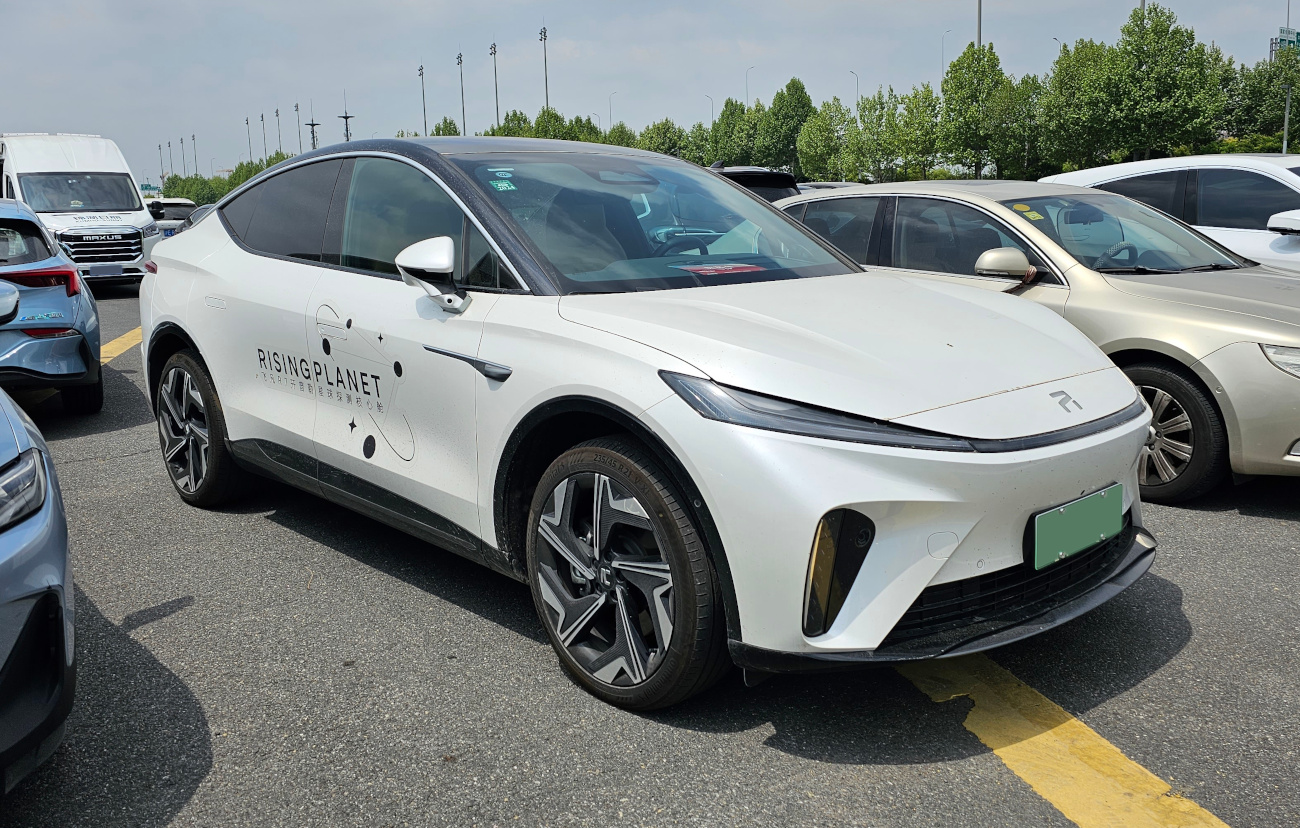

Overview
- Manufacturer: Rising Auto (SAIC Motor)
- Model code: ES33
- Also called: MG S9 EV (prototype); MG R7 (prototype)
- Production: 2022–present
- Assembly: China: Nanjing

Body and chassis
- Class: Mid-size crossover SUV
- Body style: 5-door coupe SUV
- Layout: Dual motor 4WD; Rear-motor, rear-wheel drive
- Related: SAIC Rising F7

Powertrain
- Electric motor: AC induction/asynchronous, Permanent magnet motor
- Transmission: 1-speed direct-drive reduction
- Battery: 90 kWh Li-ion
- Electric range: 600km (NEDC)

Dimensions
- Wheelbase: 2,950 mm (116.1 in)
- Length: 4,900 mm (192.9 in)
- Width: 1,925 mm (75.8 in)
- Height: 1,655 mm (65.2 in)

The SAIC Rising R7 (also known as Feifan R7) is a battery electric mid-size crossover SUV announced in 2021 by SAIC's Rising Auto brand and went on sale in 2022.

== Overview ==
The R7 was originally previewed by the ES33 concept in 2021 during the Shangai Auto Show in April. The ES33 concept was introduced alongside the newly announced "R" brand, which is an electric vehicle brand spinoff from Roewe. The R brand later received the Chinese name Chinese: 飞凡; pinyin: Fēi fán and even later, the English name Rising Auto.

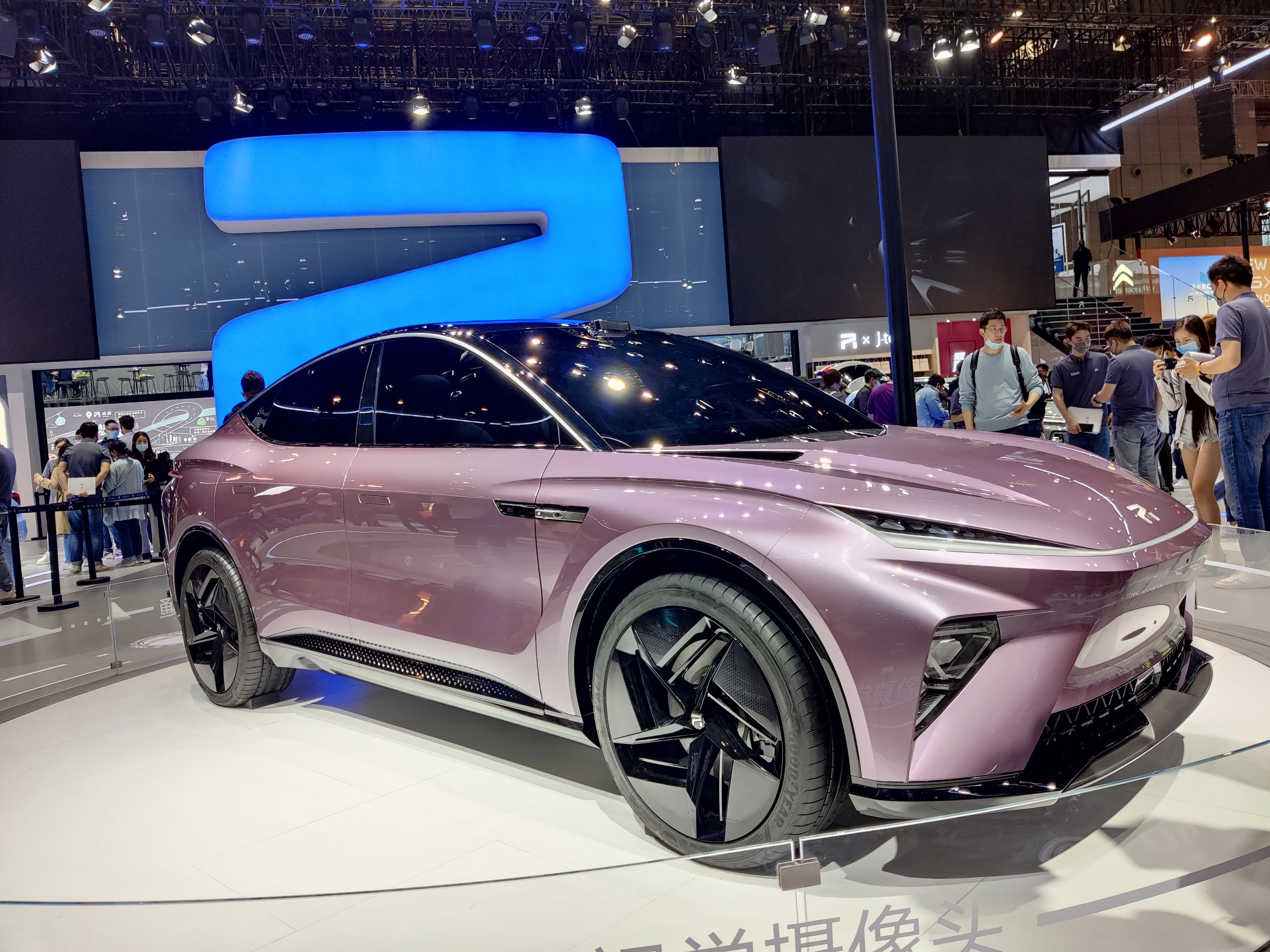
Rising Auto ES33 concept

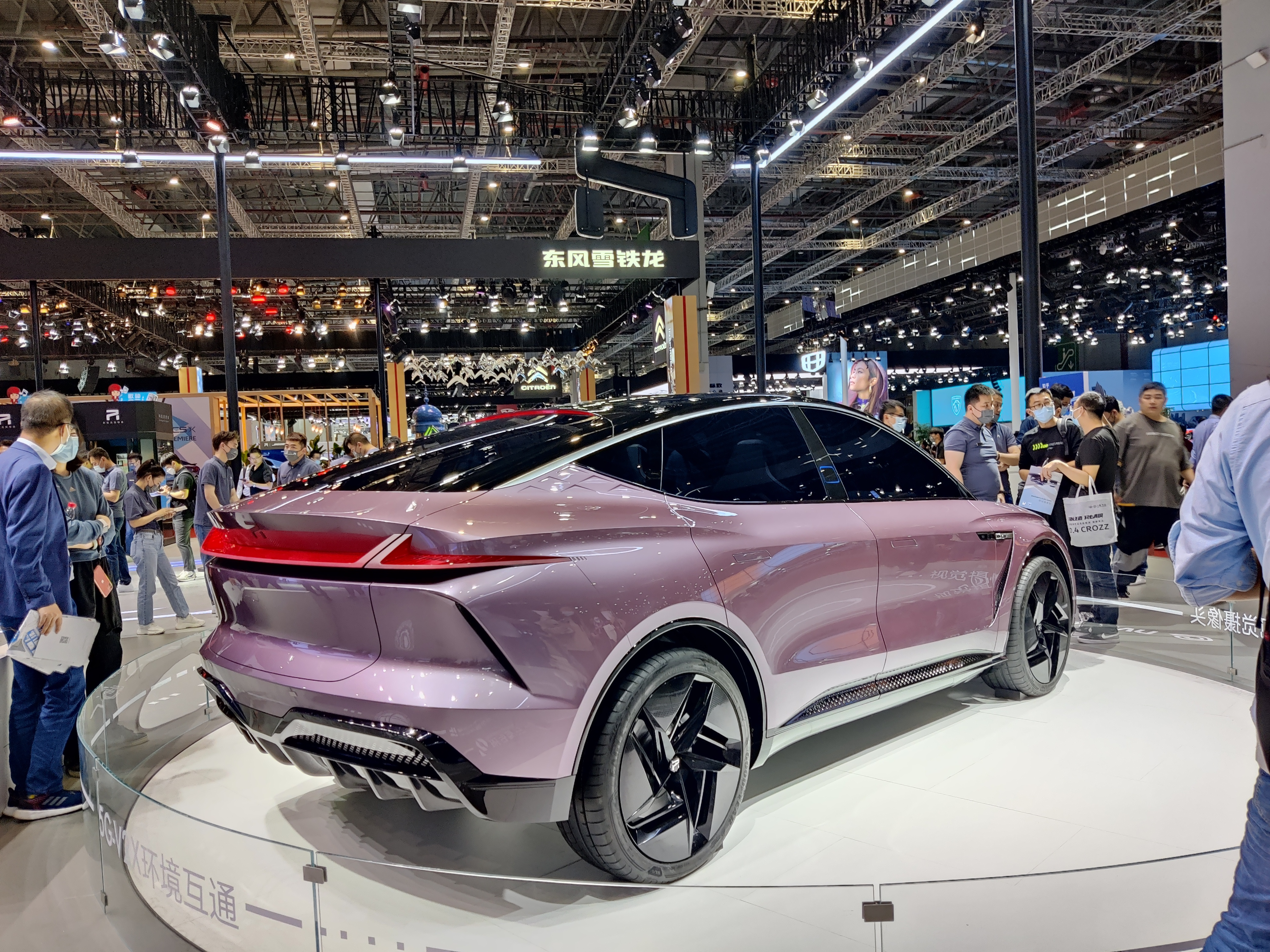
Rear view

The Rising Auto R7 is a 5-door, 5-seater crossover SUV with a sporting roofline. It is a "crossover coupe" with swappable battery and 544 hp (406 kW; 552 PS). The top of the trim variant R7 has two electric motors with a combined power of 544 hp (406 kW; 552 PS) and 700 N⋅m (516 lb⋅ft) of torque. There is also an rear-wheel-drive version with 340 hp (254 kW; 345 PS). The R7 also has a swappable ternary (NMC) battery on board offering 600 kilometres (373 mi) of range. Additionally, there are versions without swappable batteries. The drag coefficient of the Rising Auto R7 is 0.238 Cd.

The interior features a 43-inch triple screen setup with a 15.05-inch main screen. The R7 also features an AR-HUD system from Huawei with a 70-inch display area. The R7 features 33 sensors around the vehicle, including an optional LIDAR from Luminar Technologies (LAZR) with a 500-metre (1,600 ft) detection range, with data processed by an NVIDIA Orin SoC.

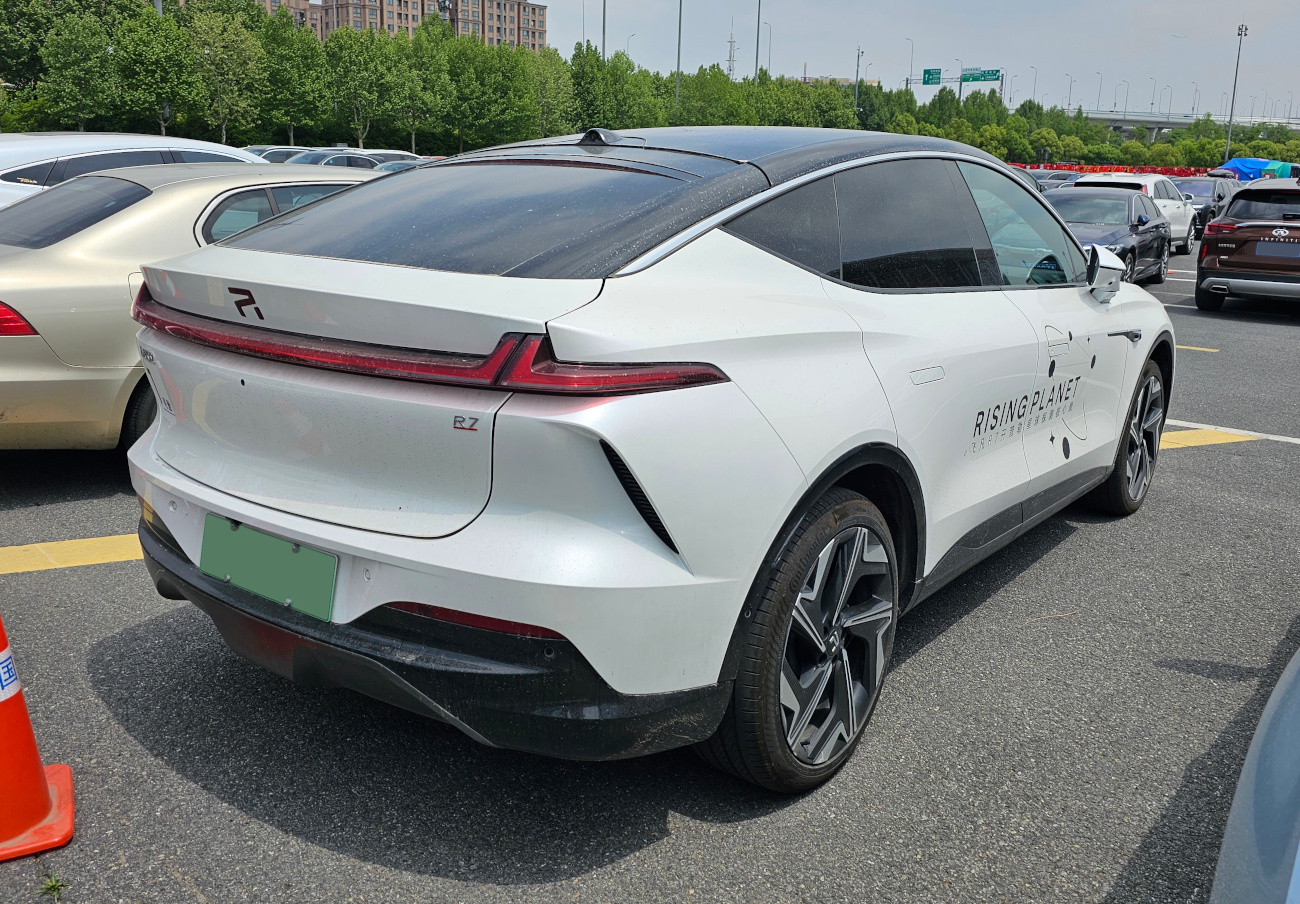
Rear view

=== 2025 facelift ===
Introduced during the 2024 Guangzhou Auto Show, the Rising R7 received a facelift for the 2025 model year, bringing the front end styling more in line with the Rising F7.

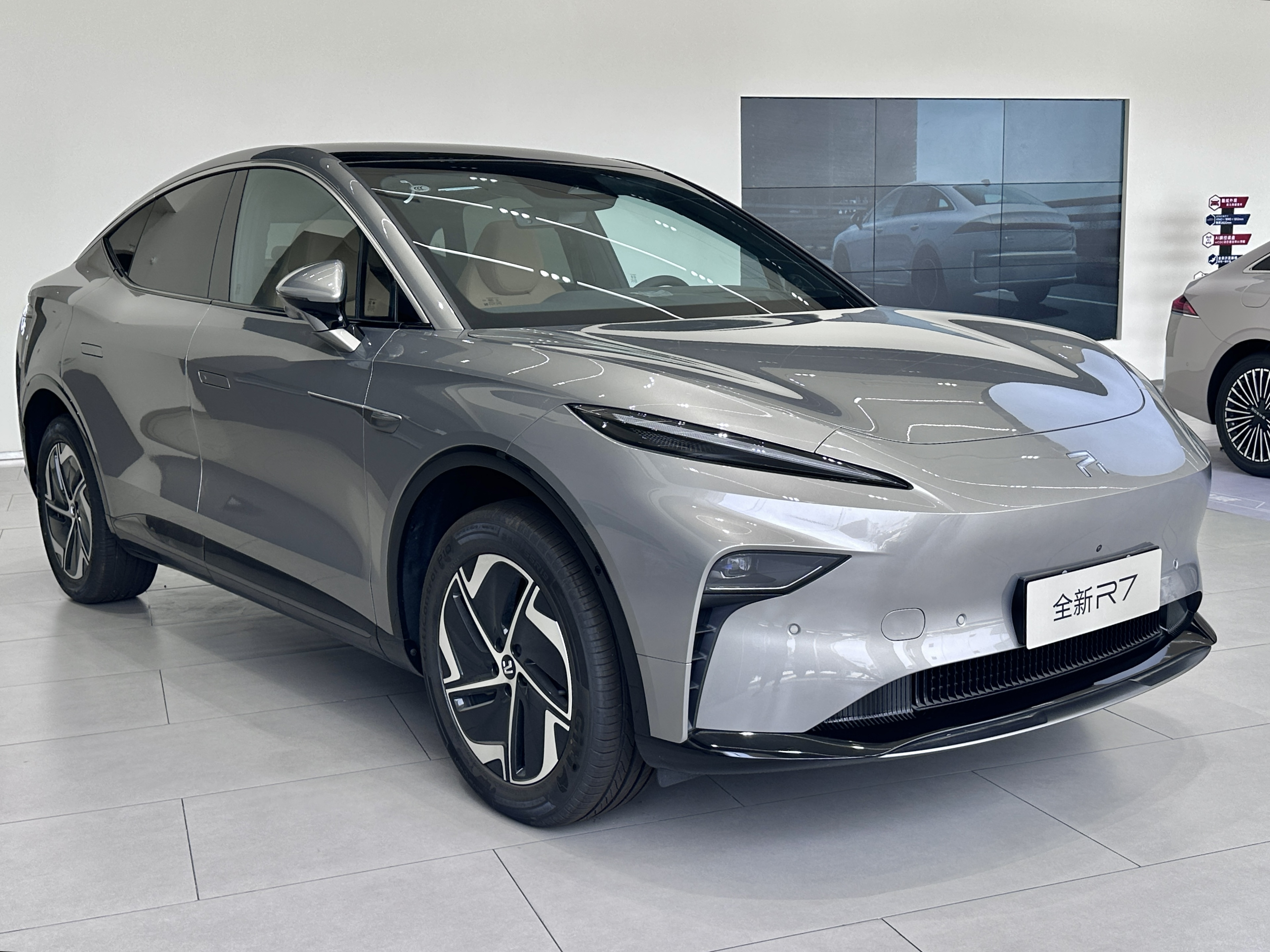
Rising R7 MY2025

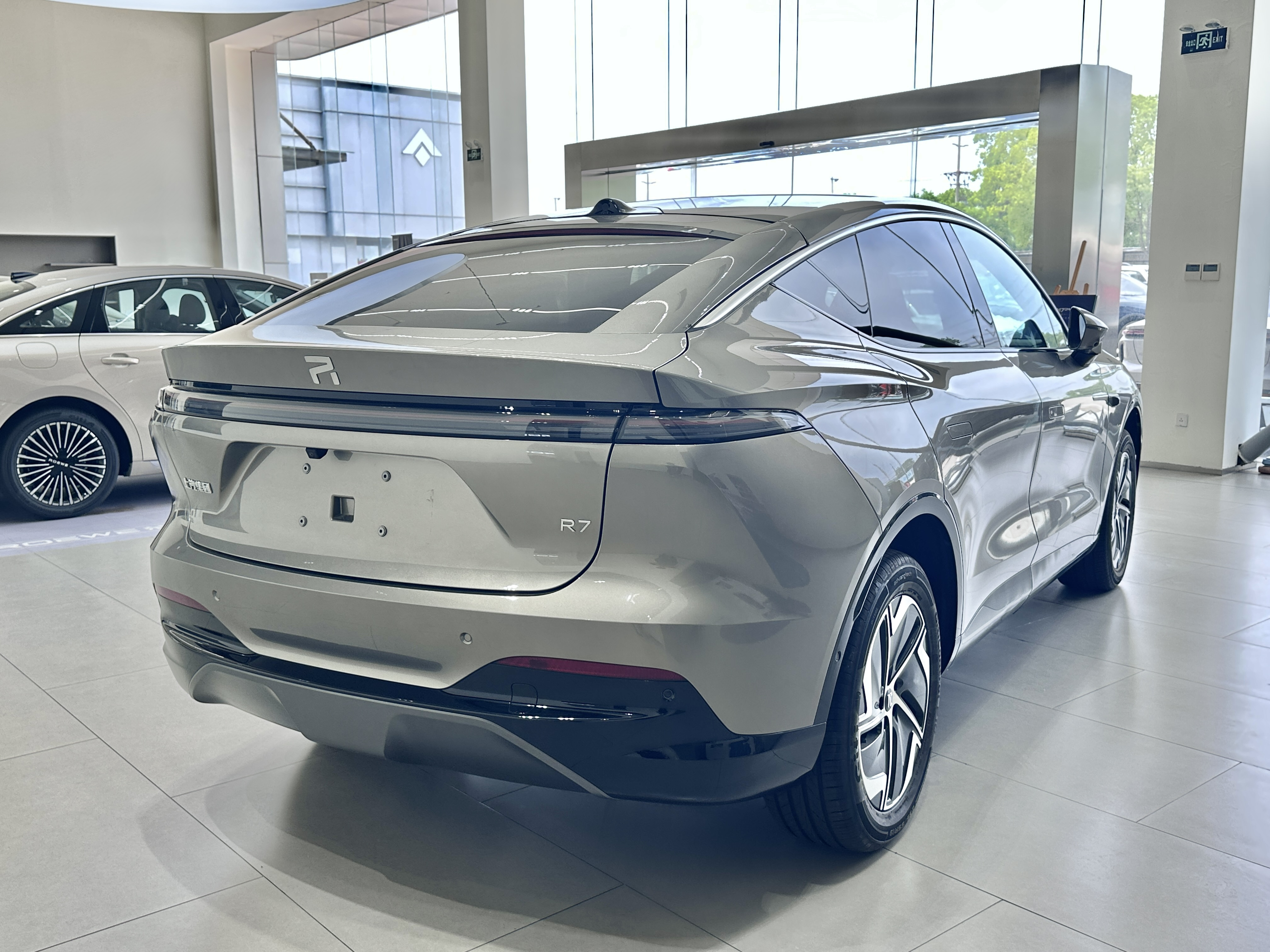
Rear view

== Overseas markets ==
The vehicle was showcased by MG Motor at the 2024 Geneva International Motor Show as the MG S9 EV.

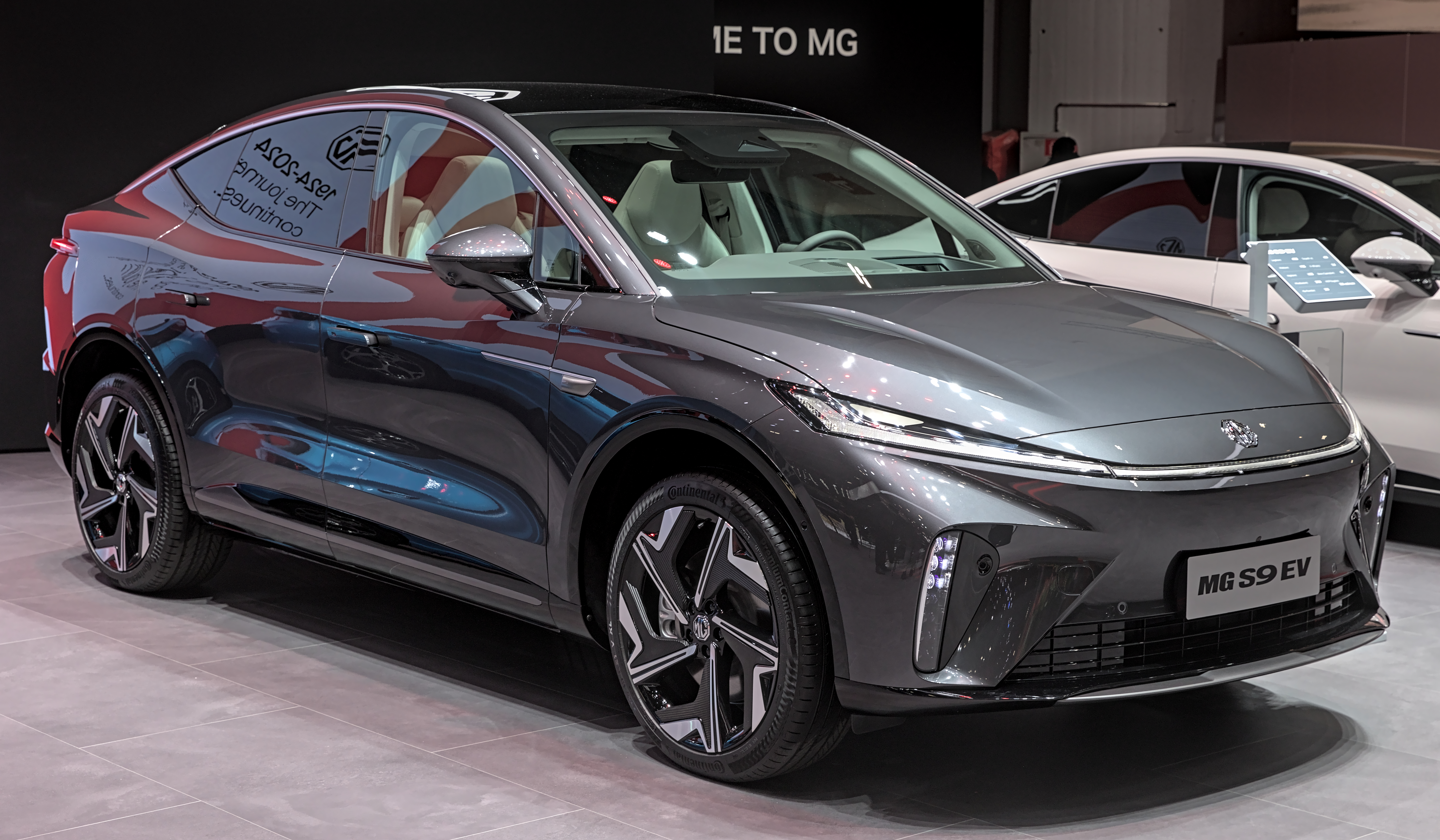
MG S9 EV

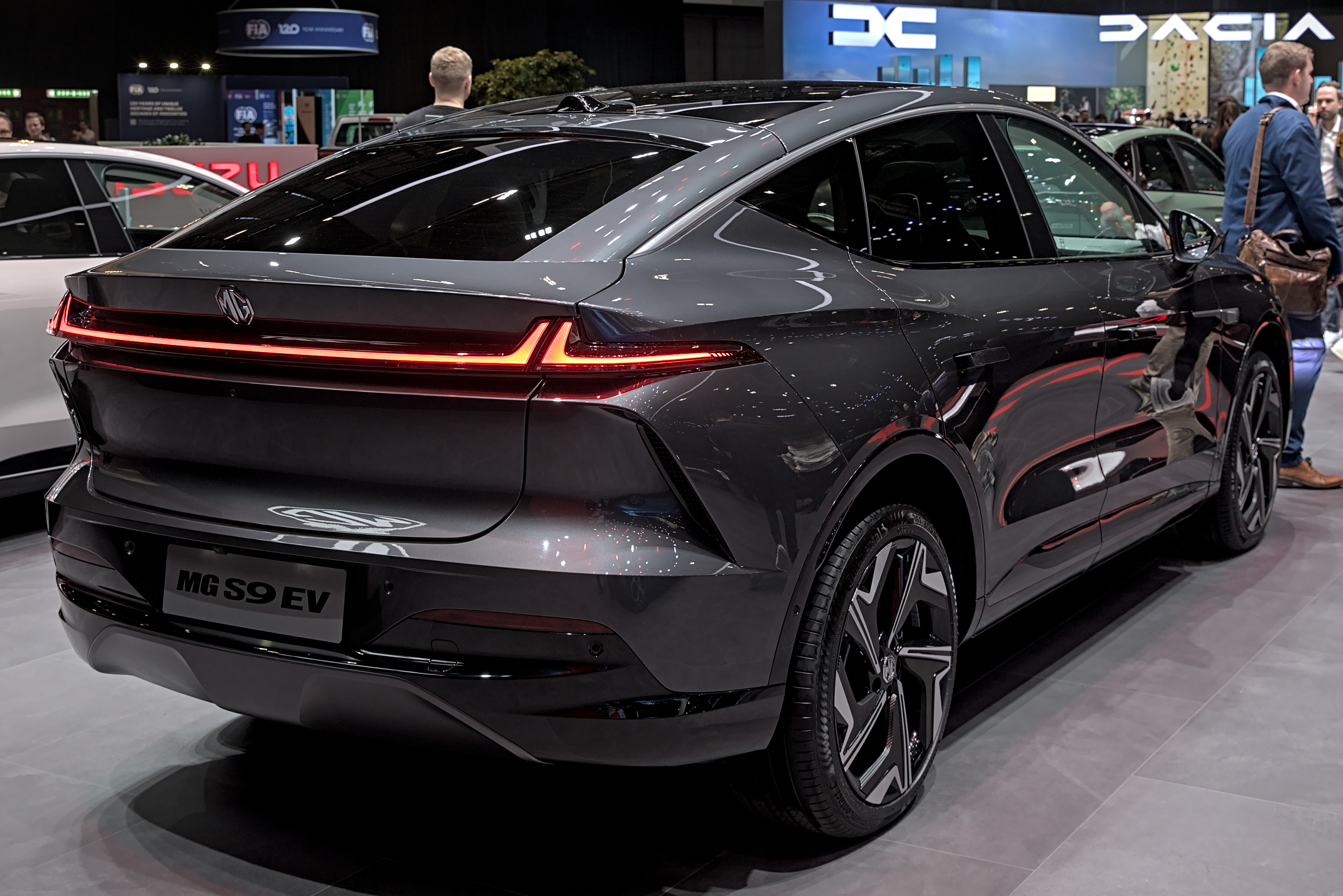
Rear view

== Sales ==
Year	China
2022	3,501
2023	4,730
2024	5,684
2025	619
