= MG ZS =

The MG ZS is an automobile nameplate of MG used for two different vehicles:

- MG ZS (2001), a small family car manufactured between 2001 and 2005 by MG Rover.
- MG ZS (crossover), a subcompact crossover manufactured since 2017 by MG Motor, a subsidiary of SAIC Motor.
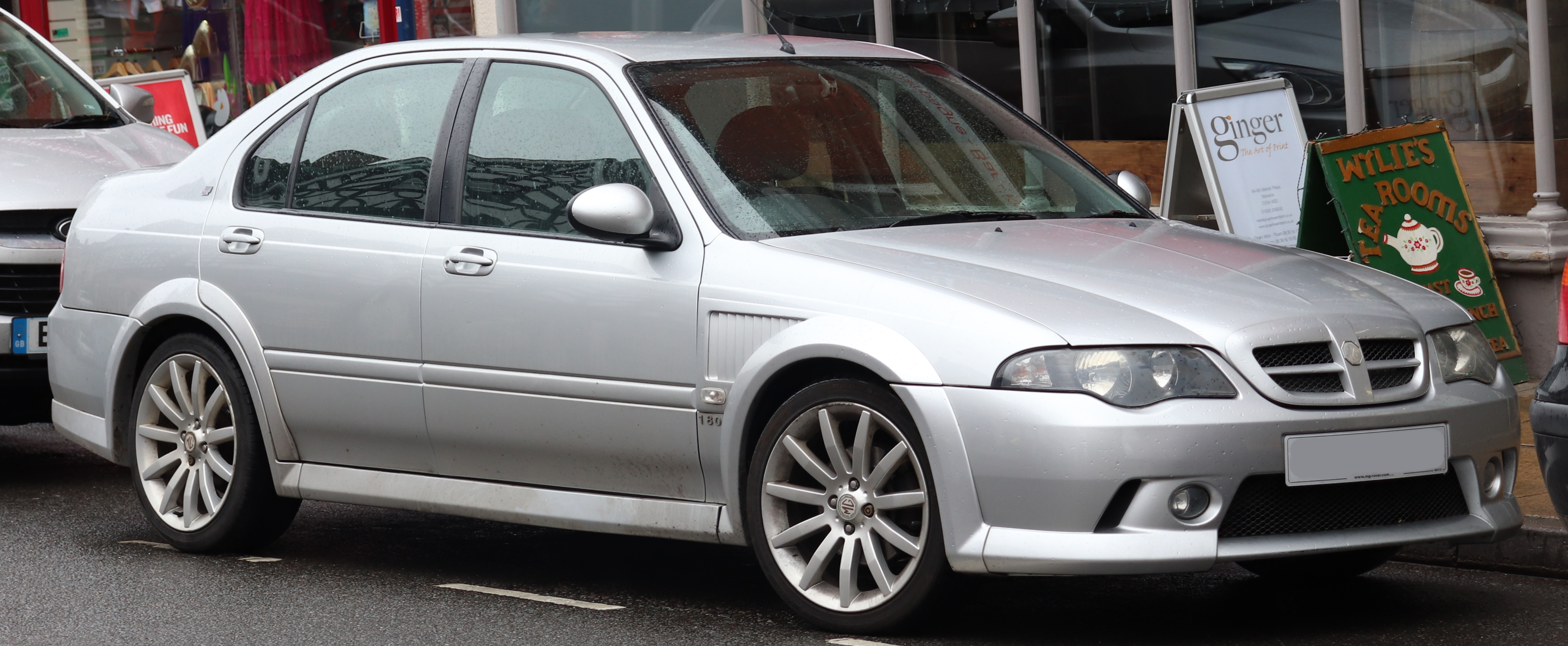
MG ZS (2001)

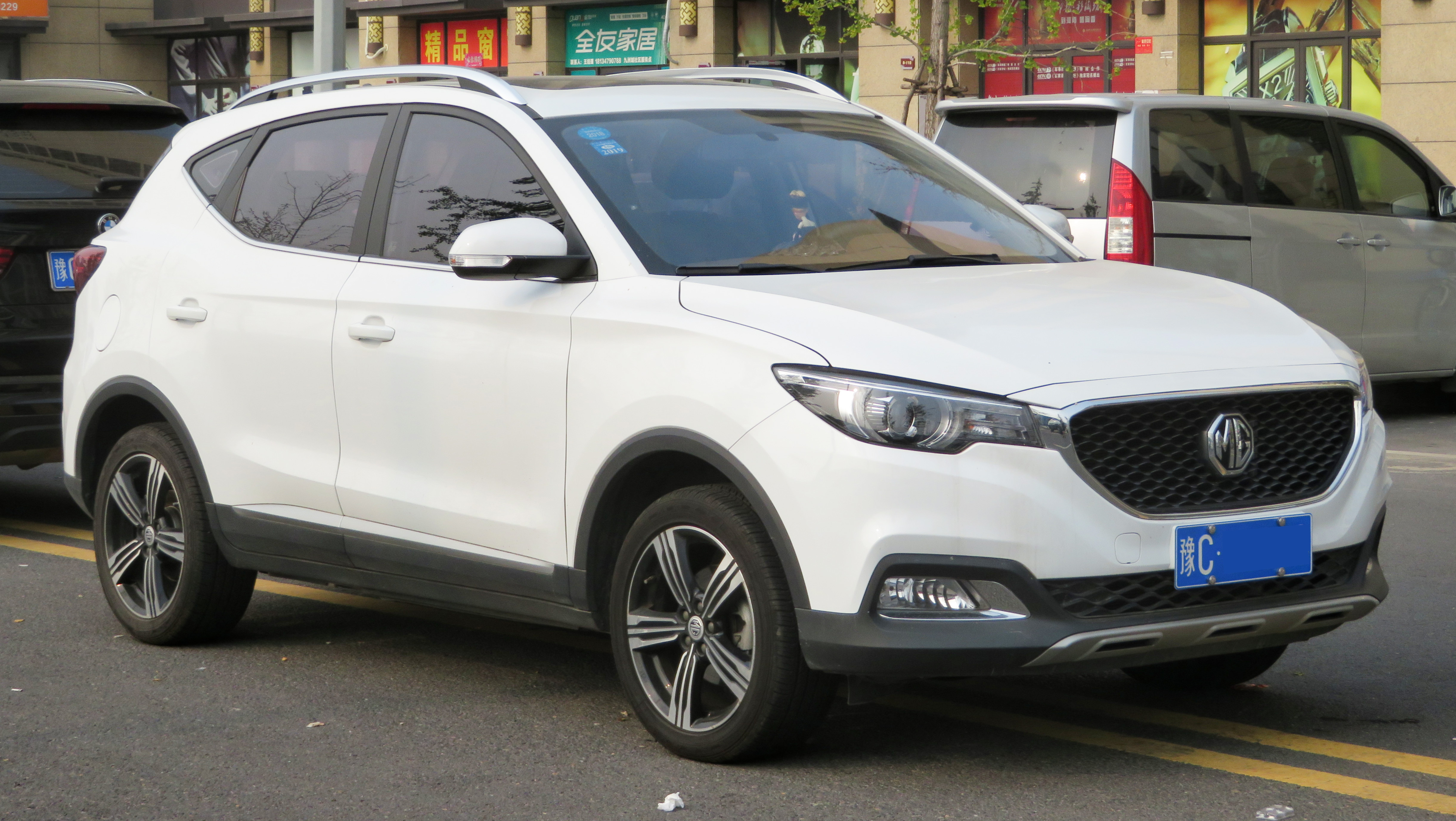
MG ZS (crossover)
