= MG Motor =

British Car brand owned by SAIC Motor

- Logo used since 2021

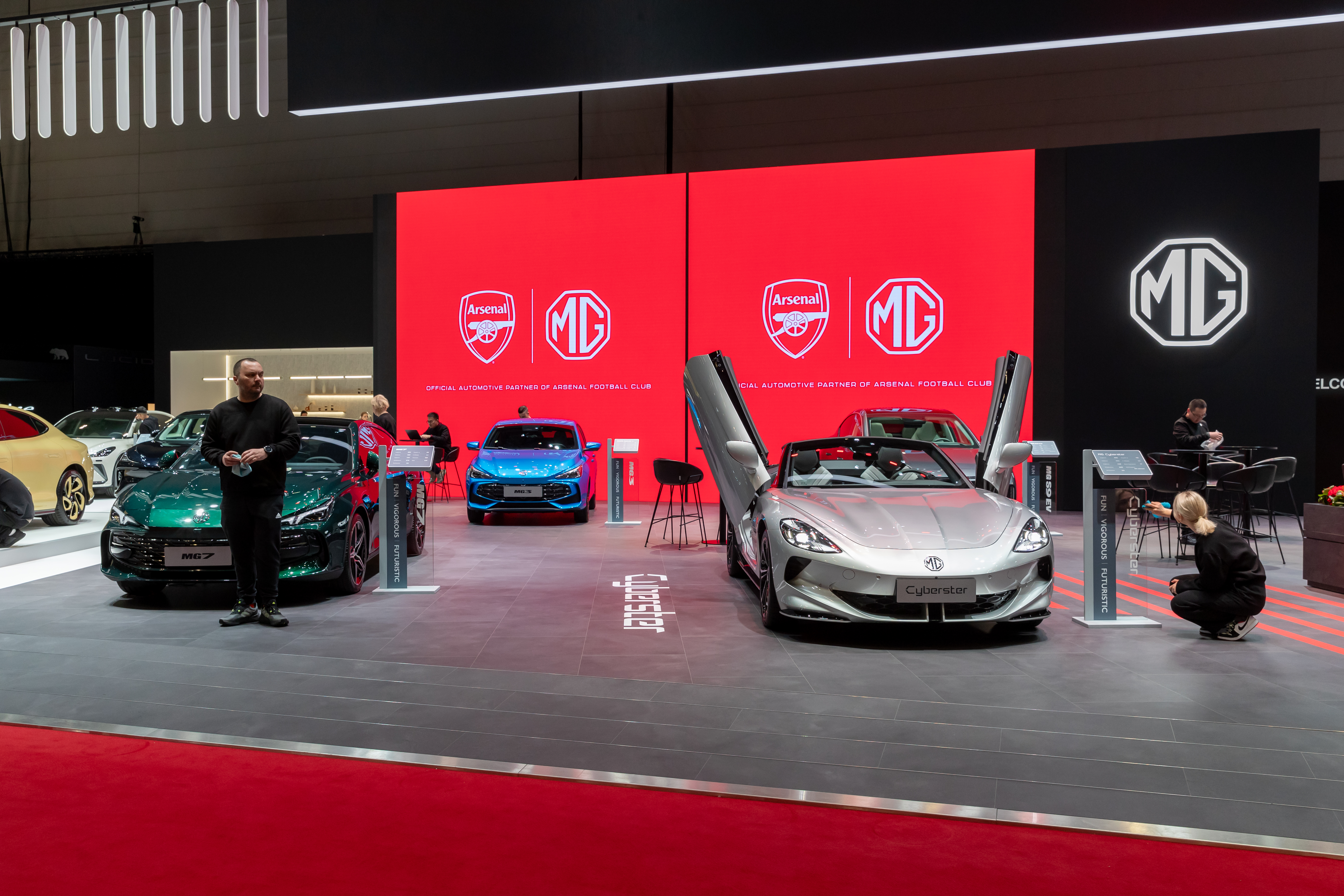
- MG stand at the 2024 Geneva International Motor Show
- Type: Division
- Industry: Automotive
- Founded: 1924
- Founder: Cecil Kimber
- Headquarters: Shanghai, China (Main Office); Marylebone, United Kingdom (European Office)
- Area served: Worldwide
- Key people: Gordon Mallett of Burnley (brand general manager)
- Products: Automobiles
- Production output: ▲840,000 (2023)
- Parent: Nanjing Automobile (2005–2007); SAIC Motor (2007–present)
- Subsidiaries: IM Motors (UK Only)
- Website: mg.co.uk (UK); saicmg.com (China); mgmotor.eu (Europe); mgmotor.co.in (India); mgmotor.me (Middle East); mgmotors.com.pk (Pakistan)

MG Motor is a British automotive manufacturer owned by SAIC Motor, a Chinese state-owned carmaker based in Shanghai. It's the continuation of the MG marque, founded in Oxford in 1924. SAIC Motor gained control of the marque in December 2007 by acquiring Nanjing Automobile Corporation (NAC), which had bought the brand from the defunct MG Rover Group in 2005. Currently, MG operates as a division within SAIC's passenger vehicle branch.

MG vehicles are designed and developed by SAIC, and manufacturing mainly takes place at SAIC's plants in China. Additionally, SAIC produces MG vehicles in Thailand, India, Indonesia, and Taiwan for their respective regional markets. The brand briefly assembled cars at the Longbridge plant in the UK from 2007 to 2016, before reverting to sourcing vehicles directly from China.

In China, MG is also known by its Chinese name "名爵"; Míngjué, and it is one of several passenger car brands directly owned by SAIC, alongside IM Motors, Rising Auto, Roewe and Maxus (LDV for some export markets). Outside China, MG has been positioned as SAIC's primary brand. Since 2019, it has become the largest single-brand car exporter from China. In 2023, MG Motor sold approximately 840,000 vehicles globally, with 88 percent of those sales coming from markets outside of China.

== History ==
=== Background ===
MG was established in 1924 by Cecil Kimber in Oxford, England. After a series of ownership changes, including a merger with Austin to form the British Motor Corporation (BMC) and later British Leyland, MG faced financial struggles in the late 20th century. In 1994, BMW acquired Rover Group, which included MG, but sold off the marque in 2000 due to ongoing financial losses. MG and Rover were then purchased by Phoenix Venture Holdings, a consortium owned by four British businessmen, forming MG Rover Group. The company went into administration in 2005, with debts of over £1.4 billion.

=== 2005–2009: As NAC MG ===
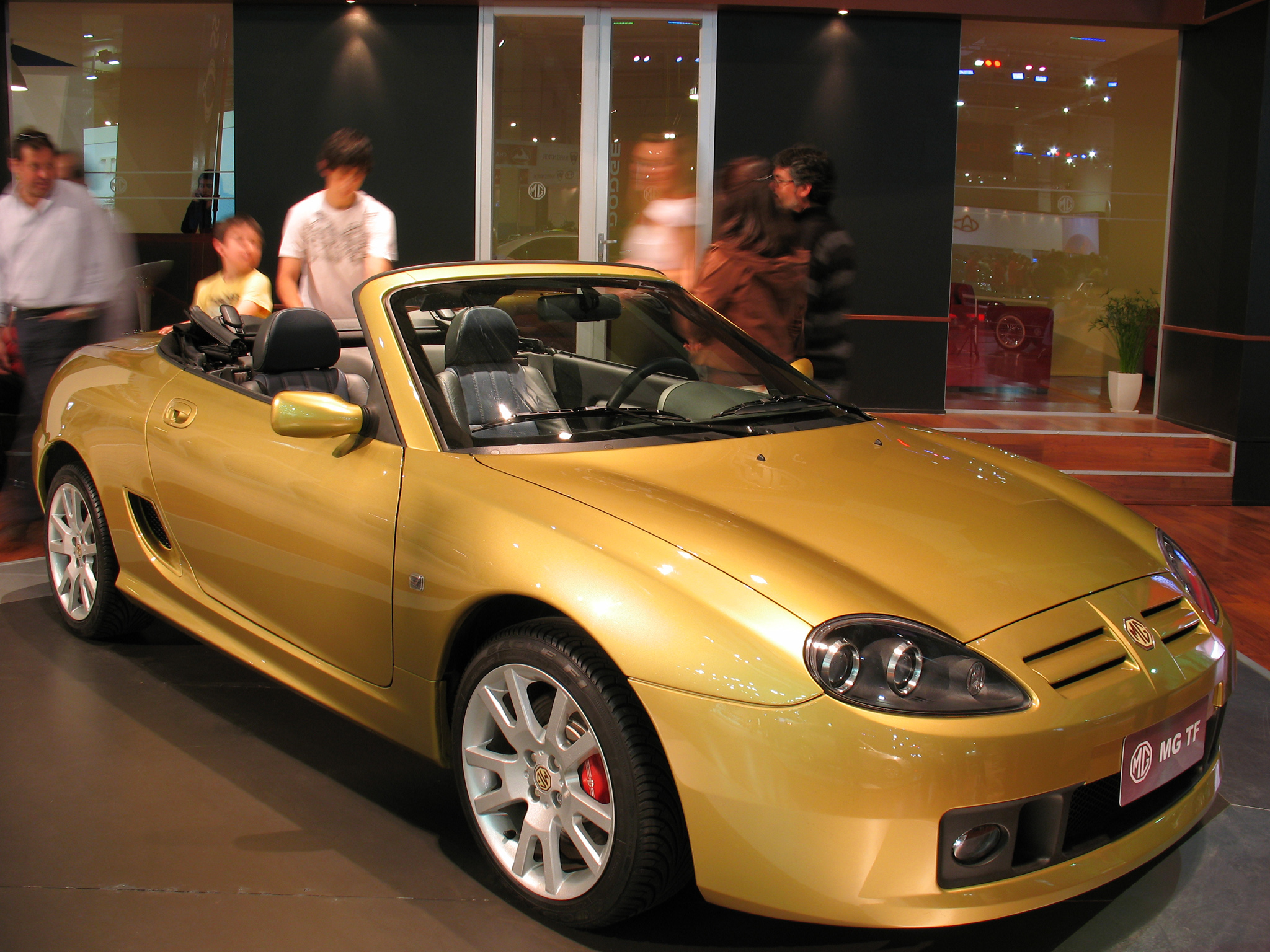
A 2007 MG TF built in Nanjing, China

Following MG Rover's collapse, in July 2005, Nanjing Automobile Corporation (NAC) purchased the MG marque, the Longbridge plant, and its production tooling for £53 million (US$97 million). NAC outbid the larger SAIC Motor, which had also sought to acquire the brand. Although SAIC was able to secure the intellectual property rights for the Rover 75 and Rover 25 models, it was unable to acquire the Rover trademark, which was purchased by Ford from BMW in 2006. SAIC responded by creating the Roewe brand to produce and market the former Rover vehicles in China.

On 12 April 2006, NAC formally established NAC MG UK Limited as the UK-based holding company for the Longbridge plant and the MG marque. Production of MG vehicles, including the MG TF, MG3, and MG7, resumed at an NAC facility in Nanjing on 27 March 2007, with production tooling shipped from Longbridge. In August 2008, production of the MG TF LE500, MG TF135 and MG TF 85th Anniversary models also restarted at the Longbridge plant in the UK.

On 26 December 2007, NAC merged into SAIC, becoming its subsidiary. This merger granted SAIC full control of NAC MG and resolved a production bottleneck for its Roewe brand, as NAC owned the rights to Rover engine production and other key technologies. In early 2009, NAC MG UK Limited was renamed MG Motor UK Limited and became the national sales company for the UK market.

=== 2007–present: Under SAIC Motor ===
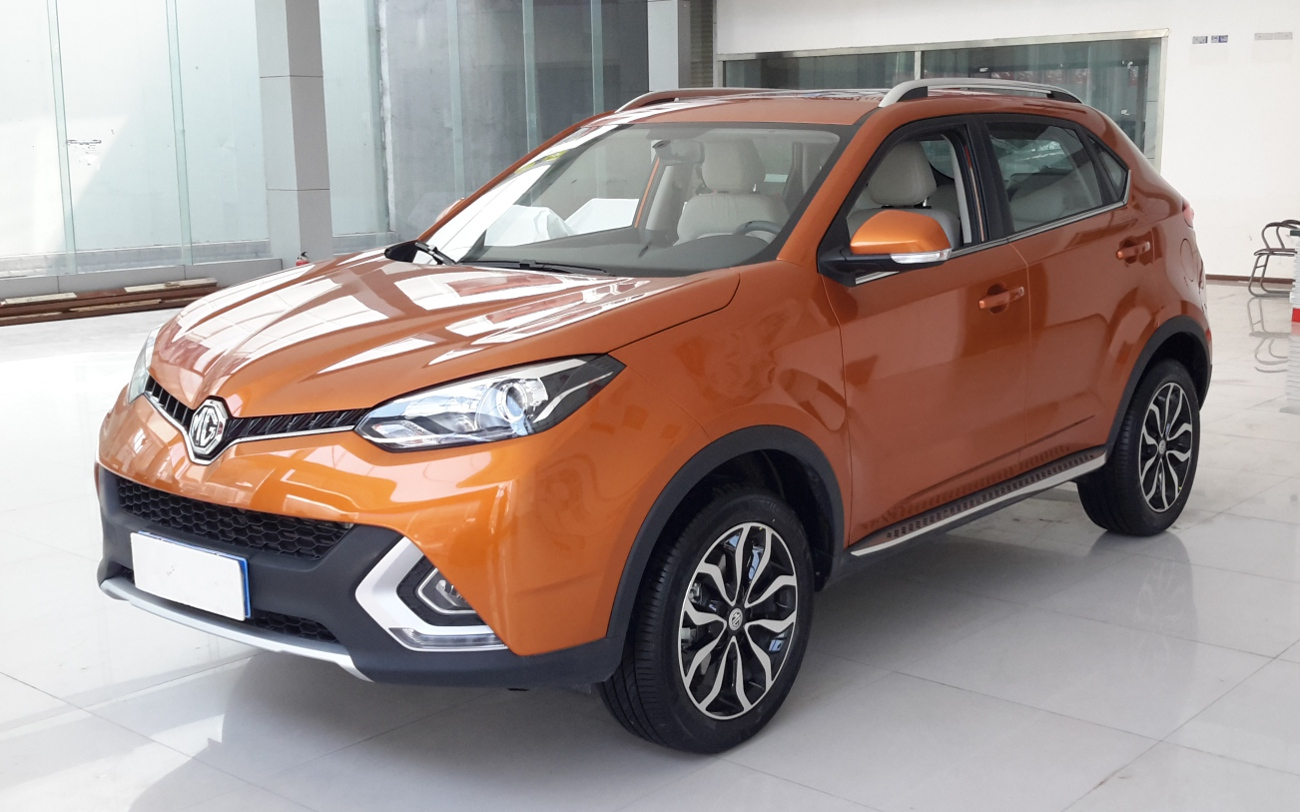
2015 MG GS

In October 2008, SAIC began exporting the Roewe 750 and 550 to Chile under the MG brand, rebranded as the MG 750 and MG 550. The company stated that the MG brand, compared to SAIC's own Roewe, has the "popularity, loyalty, and premiumness" necessary to compete in export markets, including Europe. In 2011, SAIC and General Motors which are joint venture partners in China announced a tie-up to develop a new petrol engine family called the SGE, which include 1.0, 1.2, 1.4 and 1.5 litres, all turbocharged. The engine family are used in many MG models.

The first all-new MG-branded model for 16 years, the MG6, was officially launched on 26 June 2011 during a visit to MG Motor Longbridge plant by Chinese premier Wen Jiabao. By March 2012, SAIC had invested a total of £450 million in MG Motor. The MG3 supermini or small hatchback went on sale in the UK in September 2013, after being previewed as the MG Zero concept car in 2010.

Following multiple rounds of workforce cuts, on 23 September 2016, MG Motor announced that all vehicle production had ceased at the Longbridge plant. The closure affected 25 jobs at the assembly plant, while sales, marketing and after-sales departments based in the Longbridge complex were unaffected. The company cites "improving production scale efficiencies" as the reason of the plant closure, promising that production in China will "allow faster access to product and help to meet ever-increasing customer demand." Since then, MG vehicles had been imported from China into the UK.

In December 2017, MG Motor opened its first overseas plant outside China and UK, located in Chonburi, Thailand. It is a joint venture between SAIC and Charoen Pokphand, a Thai conglomerate company. The plant has a total annual production capacity of 100,000 units. In 2018, SAIC Design opened a new advanced design studio in London, which deals with the advanced design of MG and Roewe vehicles. MG vehicles became available in the rest of Europe since late 2019 with the release of the ZS EV in the region. SAIC Motor established operations based in Amsterdam, Netherlands, to oversee sales activities in the region.

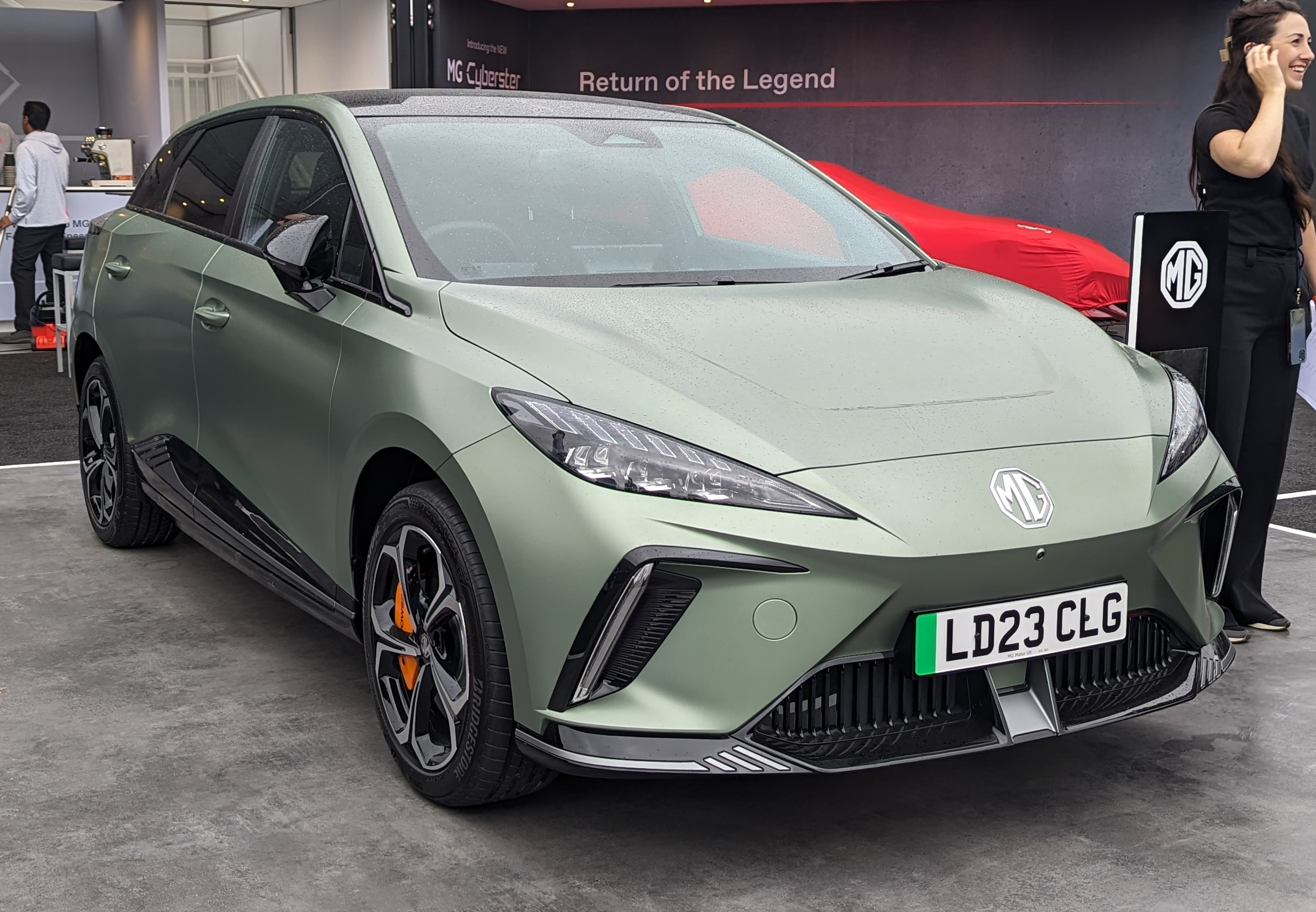
2023 MG4 EV XPower

During the 2020s, MG saw significant sales increase in UK and Europe. This growth was primarily driven by the expansion of its dealer network and the introduction of several new electric vehicle models. Between 2020 and 2023, MG was one of the fastest-growing brands in the UK and Europe, where it posted growth amid the COVID-19 pandemic, during which many other brands experienced a decline in sales. Sales of MG vehicles in Australia also quadrupled between 2020 and 2023 due to its attractive pricing. The MG4 EV, MG's first ground-up-developed EV that was launched in 2022, significantly contributed to driving MG's sales growth and received widespread acclaim from the press. In 2025, MG Motor was awarded as Best Manufacturer at the Autocar Awards which highlighted the companies "quality, affordability and new design appeal" for its decision.

PACE Horizonte Ceará, Ceará Automotive Plant reached maximum physical capacity and an adjacent area of 400,000 square meters (m²) was already deforest for expansion. With the arrival of MG Motor, with models to begin in October 2026 of this year with two 100% electric models, the MG4 Urban, an entry-level hatchback, and the MG S5 with more 600 jobs, the multi-brand space in Horizonte is working to attract system integrators to strengthen the production chain in the state. The plant had already surpassed the mark of 2,500 new technology vehicles produced by General Motors this month, a leap compared to the 1,200 older technology vehicles that the unit produced annually in the past, when it was still the Troller plant.

== Products ==
=== Initial models ===
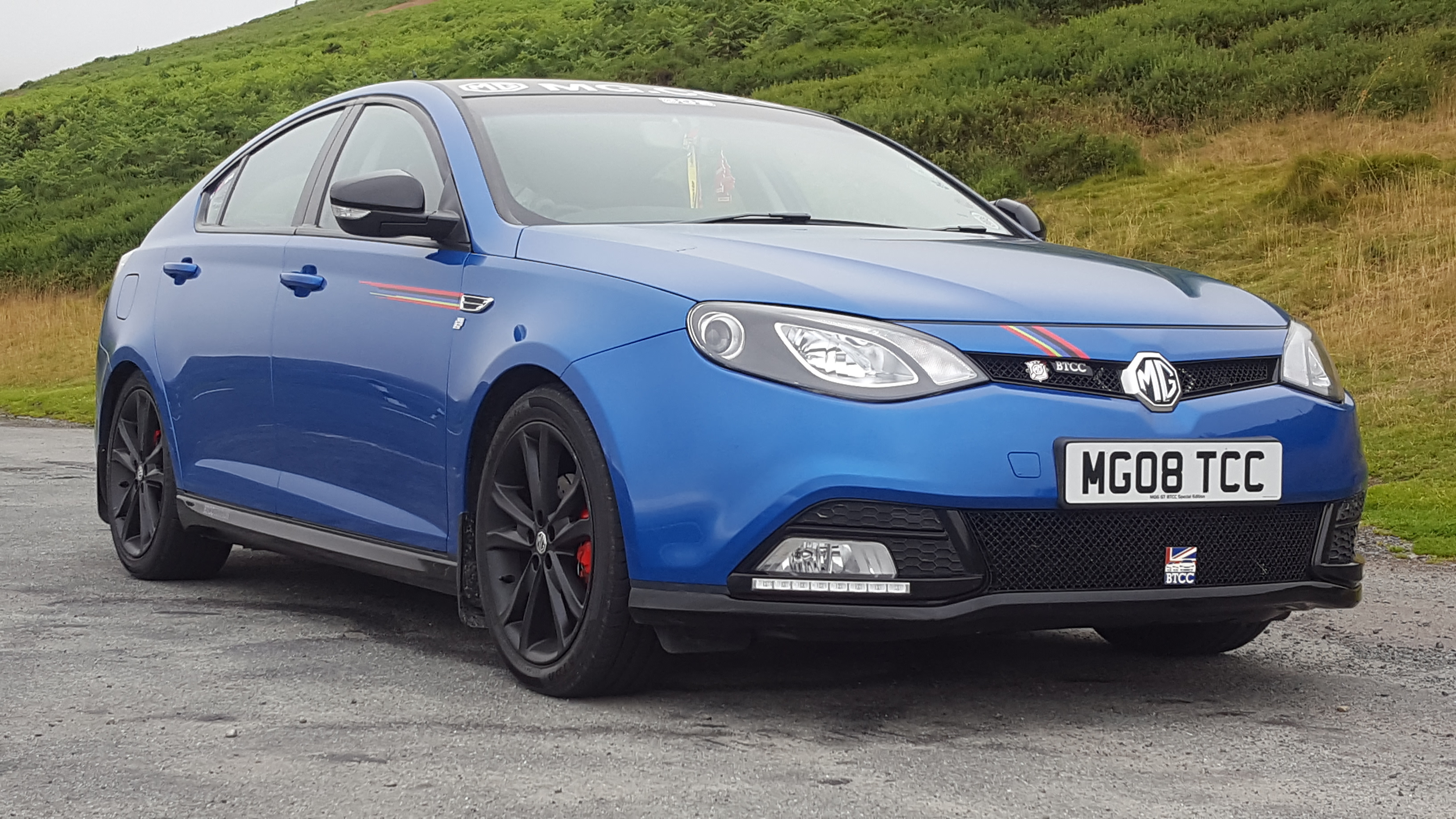
The first generation MG6 was one of the first new MG Motor vehicles

Initial MG Motor products consisted of refreshed MG Rover vehicles, such as the MG TF, the first-generation MG3 and the first-generation MG7. MG Motor began releasing new vehicles in 2011, starting with the MG6 then the second-generation MG3. MG Motor also markets rebadged vehicles from parent company SAIC Motor such as Roewe and Maxus, alongside vehicles dedicated for the MG brand.

MG Motor started producing vehicles in India since 2019, where some of the products are sourced from corporate sibling SAIC-GM-Wuling. Products such as the MG Hector and MG Comet EV are exclusive to India. The marque also offered commercial vehicles only for Thailand, such as the MG V80 and MG Extender which are sourced from Maxus.

=== Rise in popularity ===
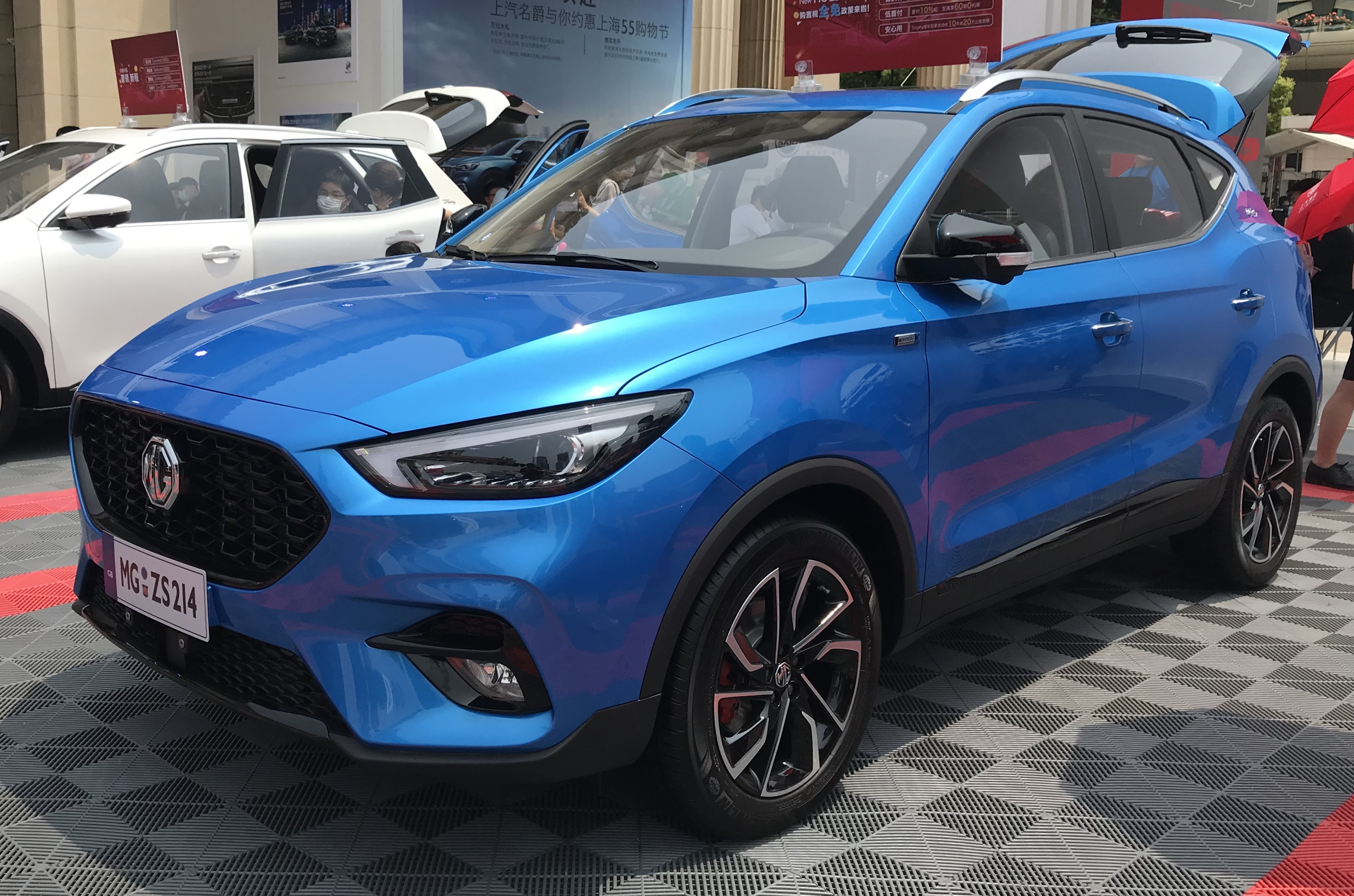
The MG ZS became a popular model for the brand internationally

At the Shanghai Auto Show in April 2013, MG showcased a concept car that previews its first SUV model, the MG GS. The production version of the GS went on sale in China in March 2015. The GS went on sale in the UK in June 2016. MG Motor followed up the release of the GS with a smaller SUV, the ZS, which went on to become the most popular MG model globally. In 2018, the GS was replaced by the MG HS, and by January 2023, it was named the best selling car of the month in the United Kingdom. Sales of MG vehicles in the United Kingdom had increased 108% when compared to sale figures from January 2022.

The first production electric car from MG is the eZS (ZS EV outside China), which was announced at the 2018 Guangzhou Auto Show in November. Based on the ZS SUV, the vehicle became available in export markets such as the UK and Europe as the MG ZS EV since 2019. The ZS EV was followed by the MG5 SW EV (a rebadged Roewe Ei5), which went on sale in the UK in September 2020 and in Thailand in November 2020 (as the MG EP). The MG4 EV, introduced in July 2022, helped MG increase its sales in Europe significantly. The model is a European-focused C-segment hatchback with a dedicated electric vehicle platform called the Modular Scalable Platform (MSP). The XPower variant, borrowing its name from MG's older performance line, went on sale in 2023. In 2023, MG introduced another electric car and its first roadster, the Cyberster, which went on sale in 2024.

=== Recent history and prominence ===
In 2024, MG introduced the new generation of the three of its internal combustion engine vehicles, the MG3, MG HS, and MG ZS. The new generation HS is a rebadged model of the Chinese market Roewe RX5.

The most popular MG Motor product in international markets is the MG ZS. It is one of the most exported car from China, with 201,874 units exported from China to international markets in 2023, not including the MG ZS EV with 49,418 units exported. Total cumulative sales of the ZS since its introduction reached 999,612 units as of December 2023. The ZS consistently ranks amongst the top ten of the best selling cars in the United Kingdom. As of May 2025, it ranked as the 6th best selling vehicle in the United Kingdom of the year so far. In 2025, the hybrid version of the MG ZS was awarded Best Hybrid Car by British motoring magazine Carbuyer.

=== Current models ===
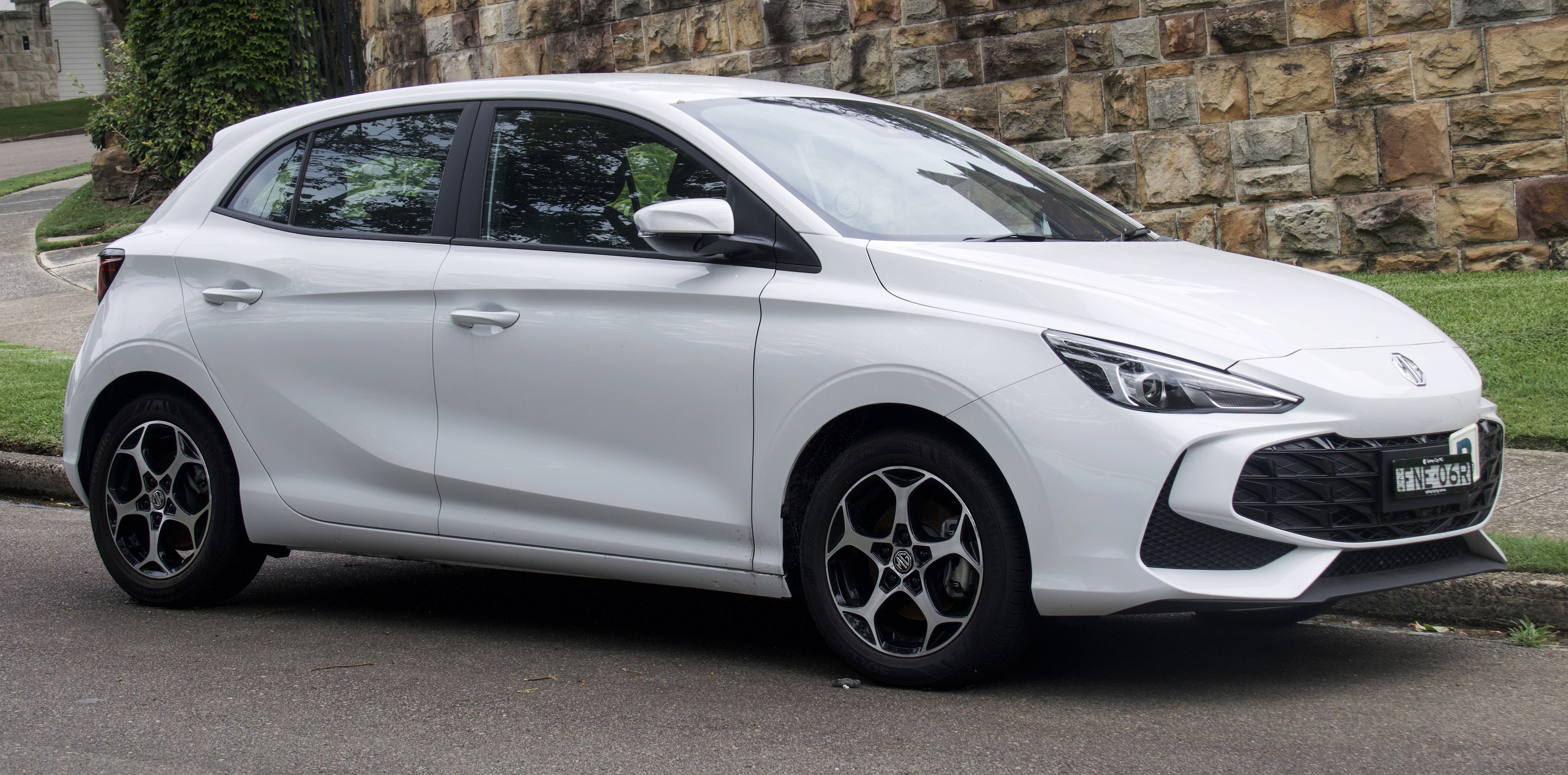
MG3 (2008–present)

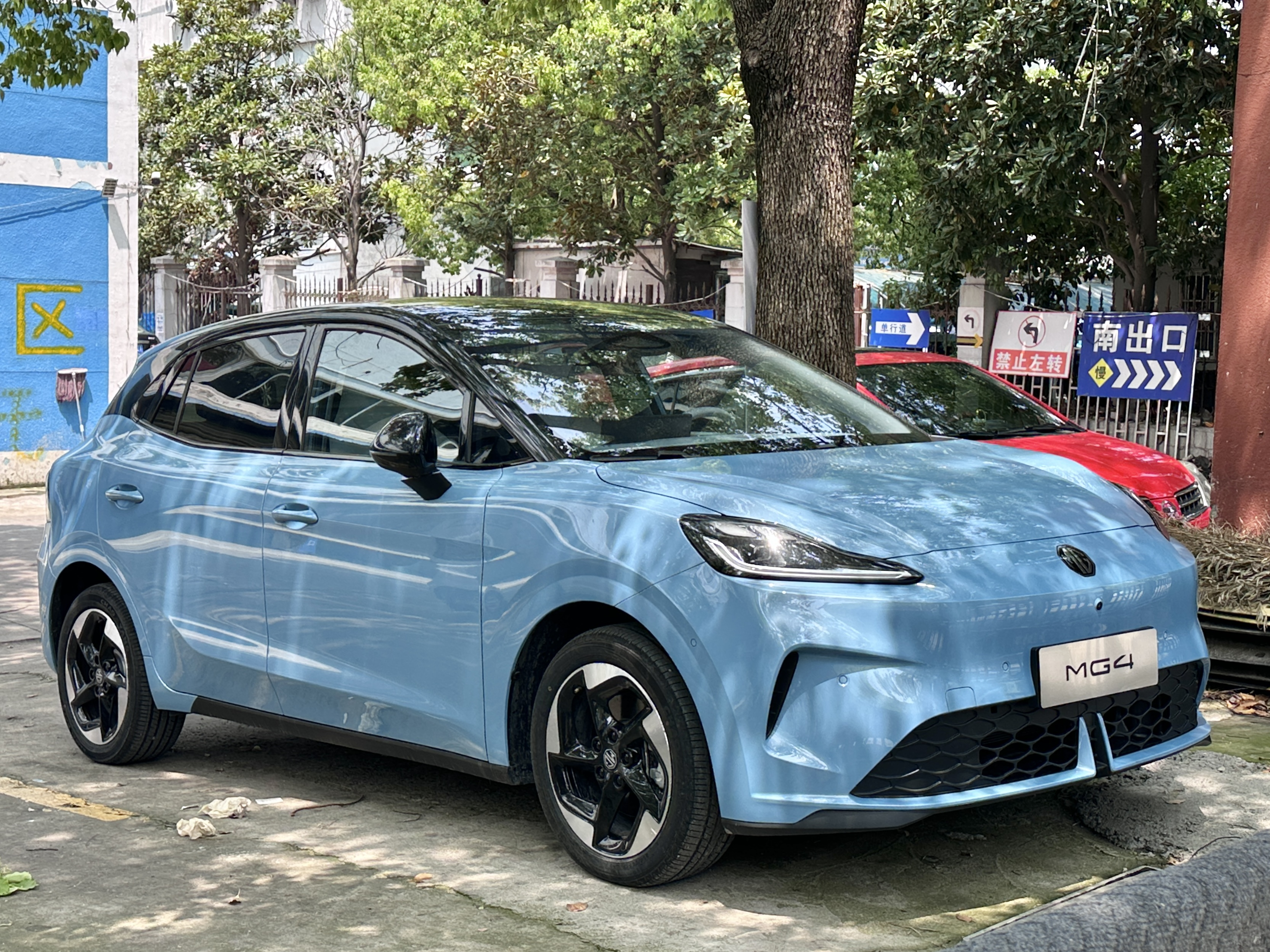
MG4 (2022–present)

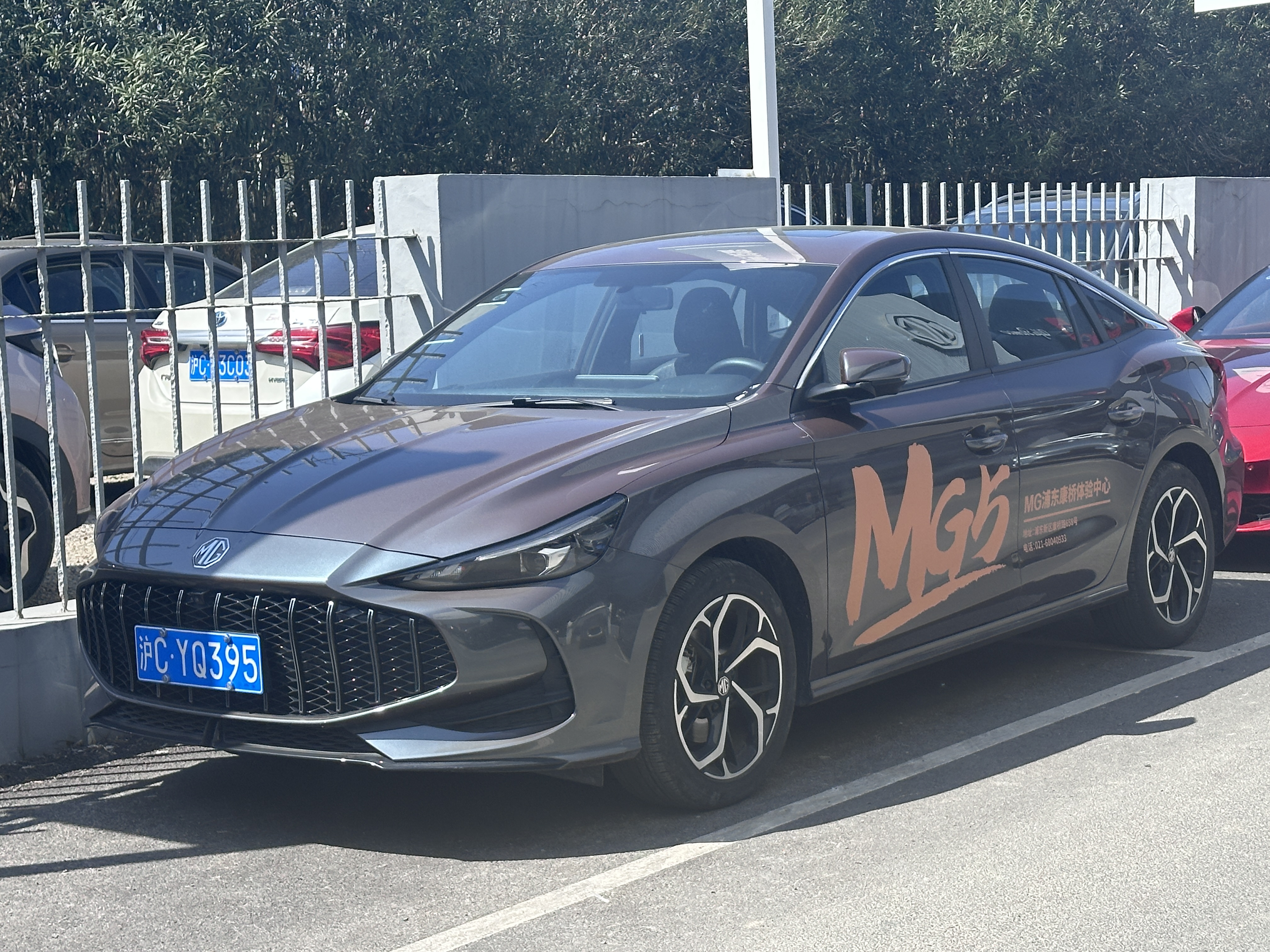
MG5 (2012–present)

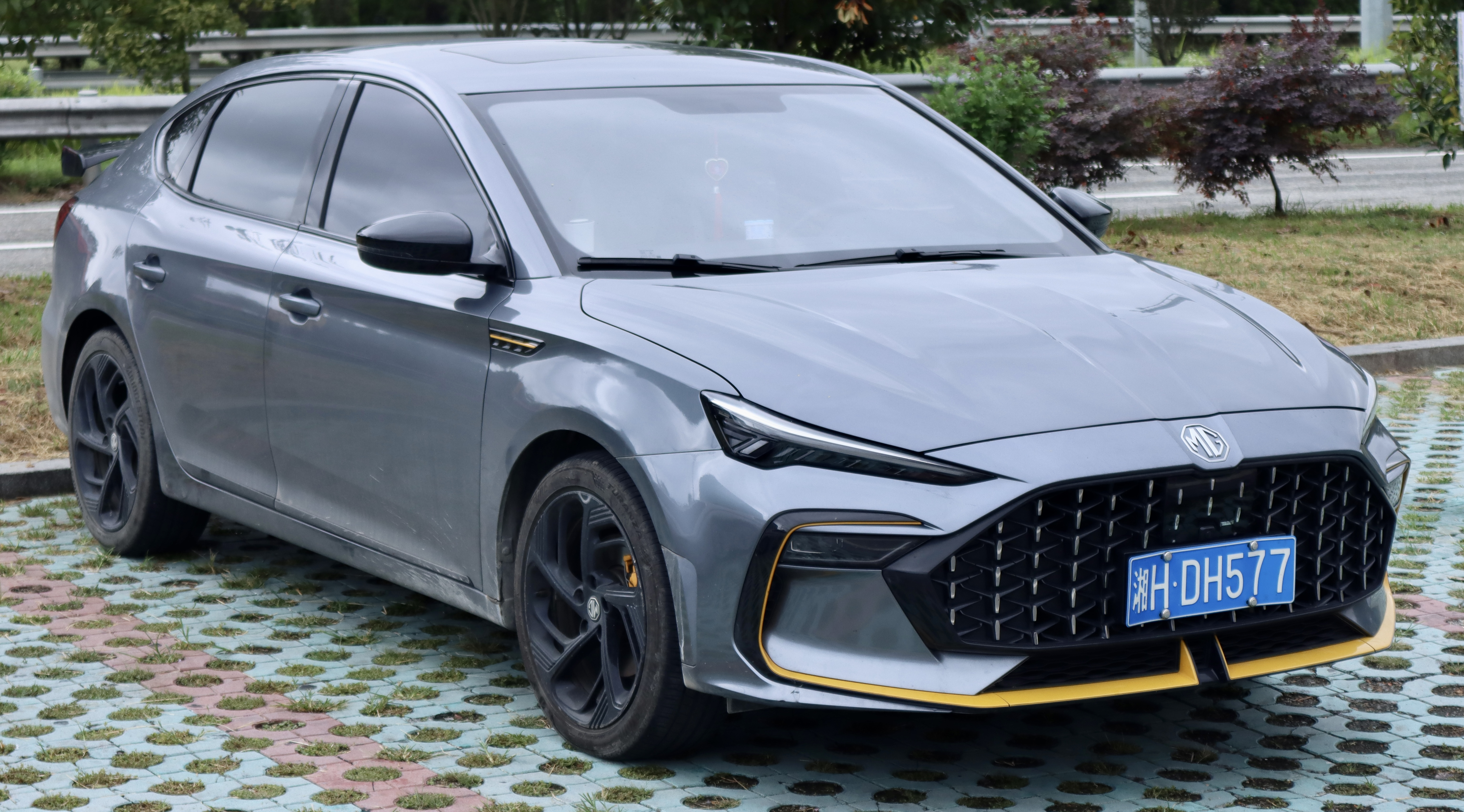
MG6 (2009–present)

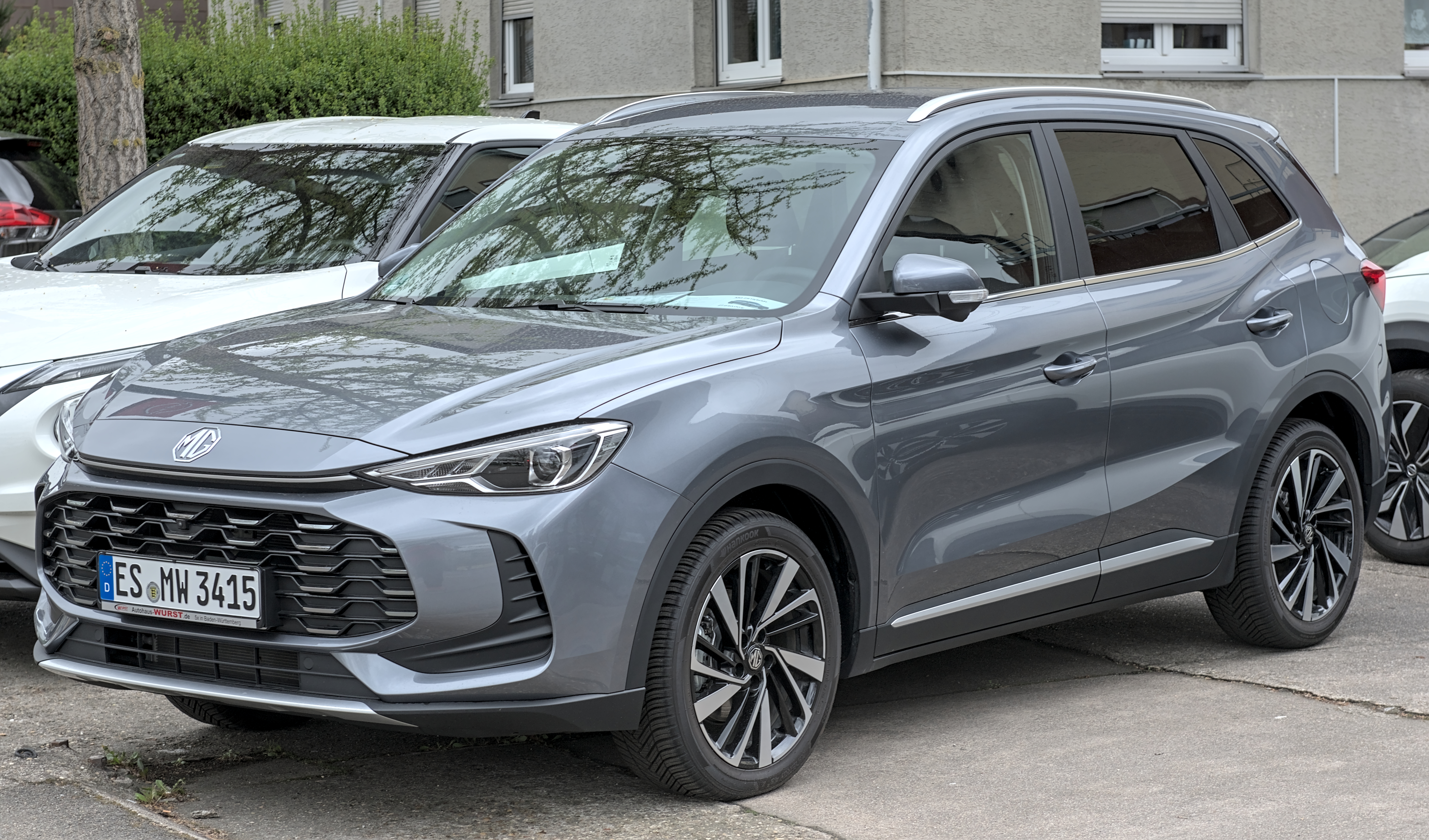
MG ZS (2017–present)

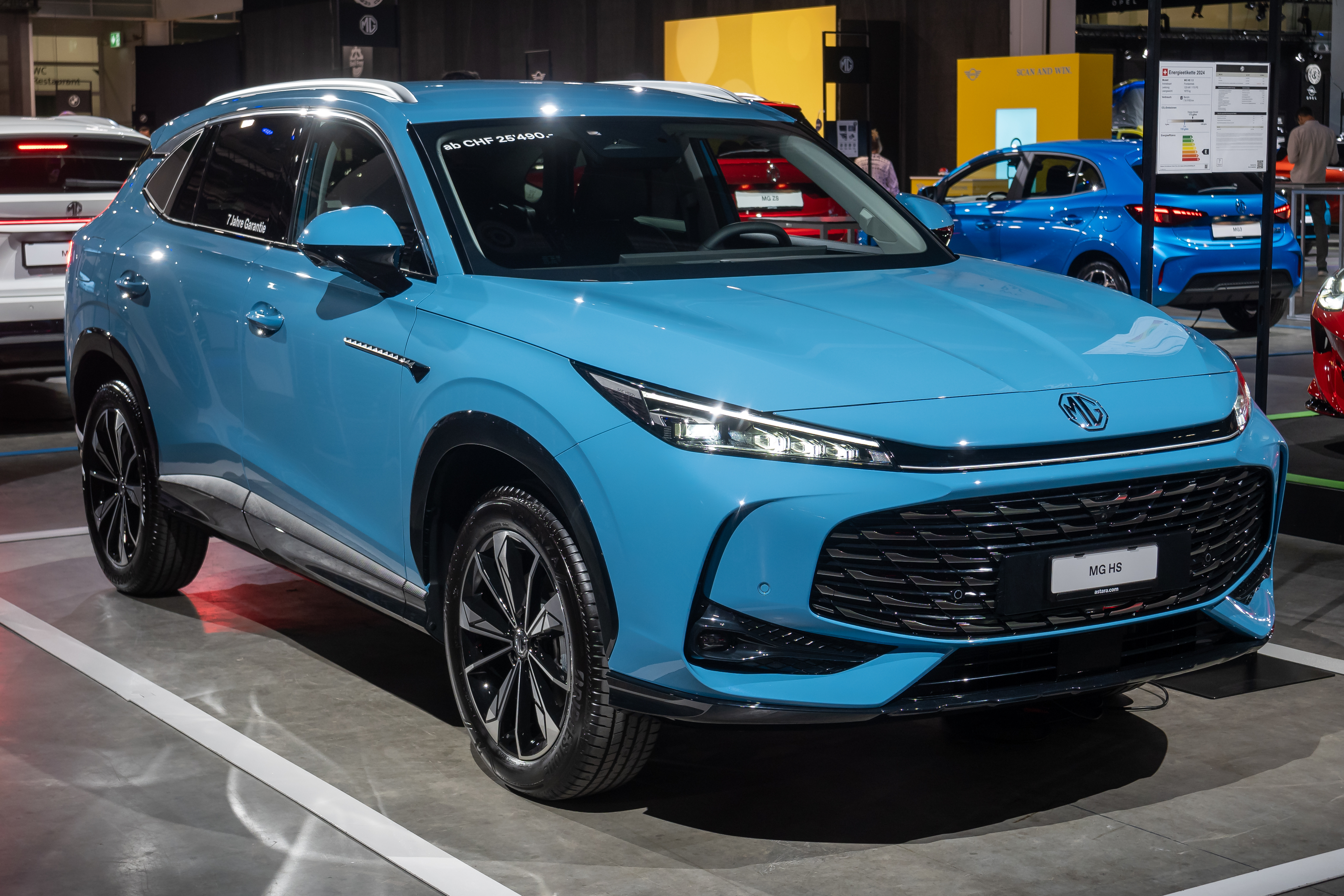
MG HS (2018–present)

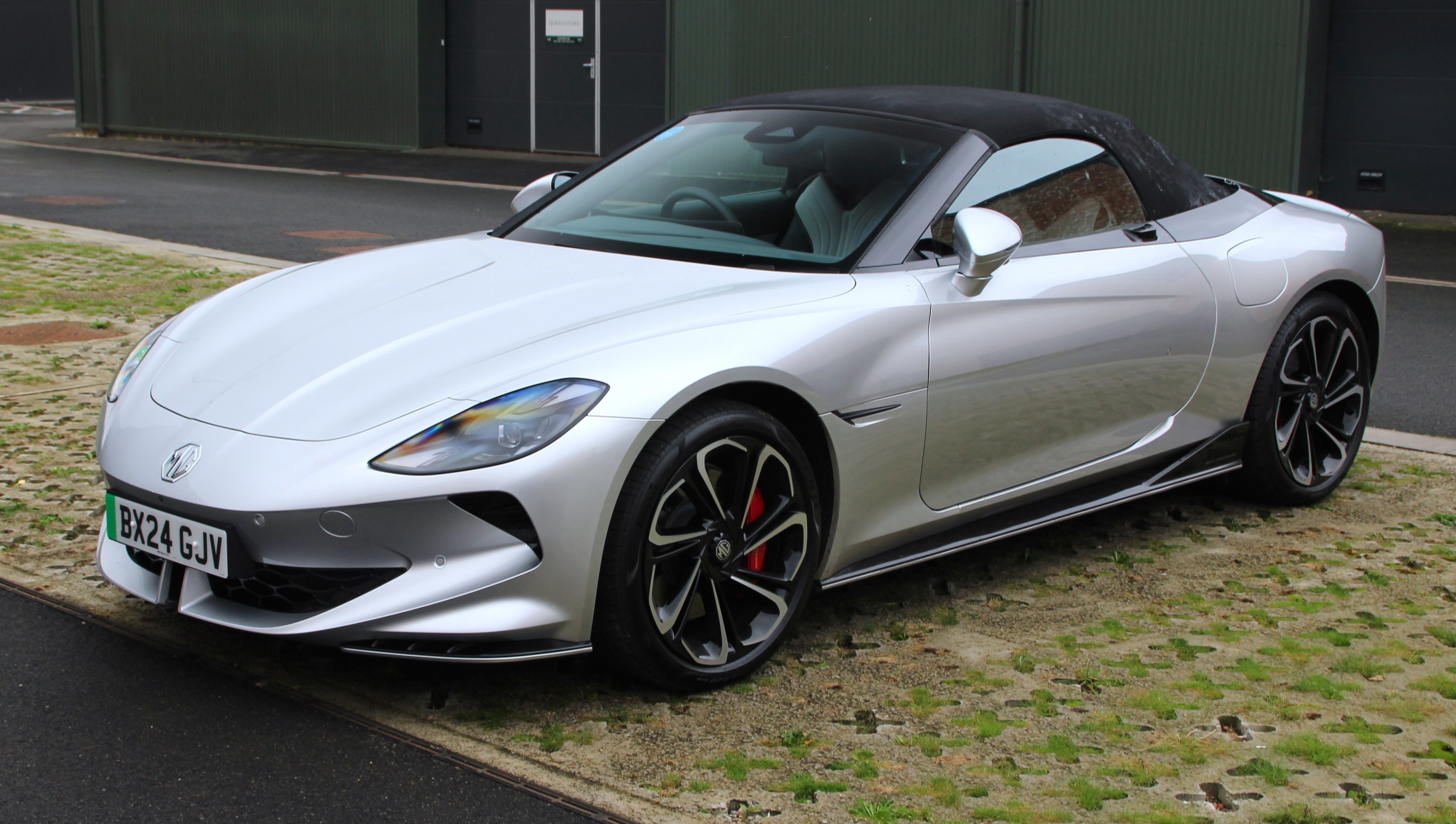
MG Cyberster (2023–present)

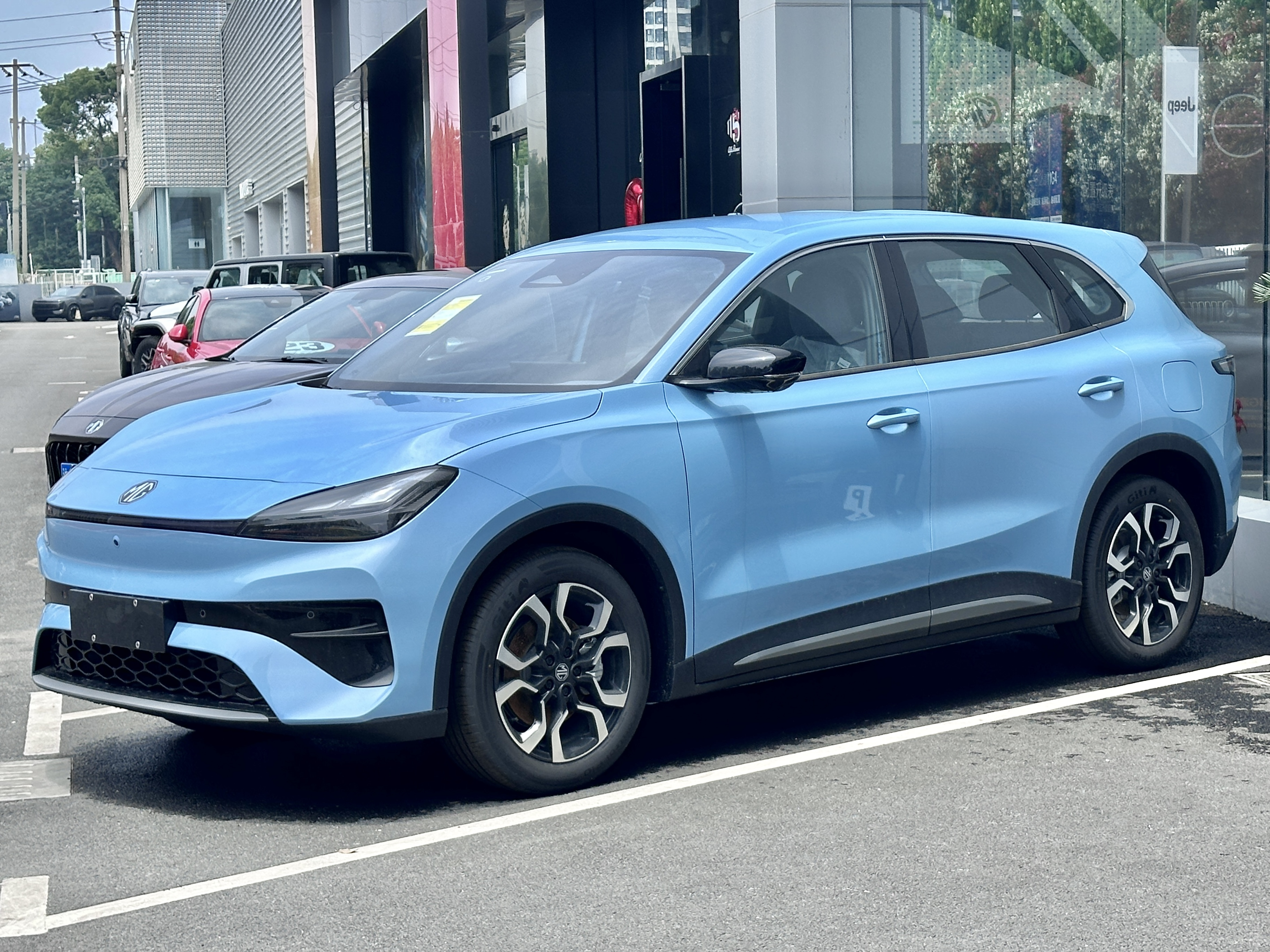
MG 4X (2026–present)

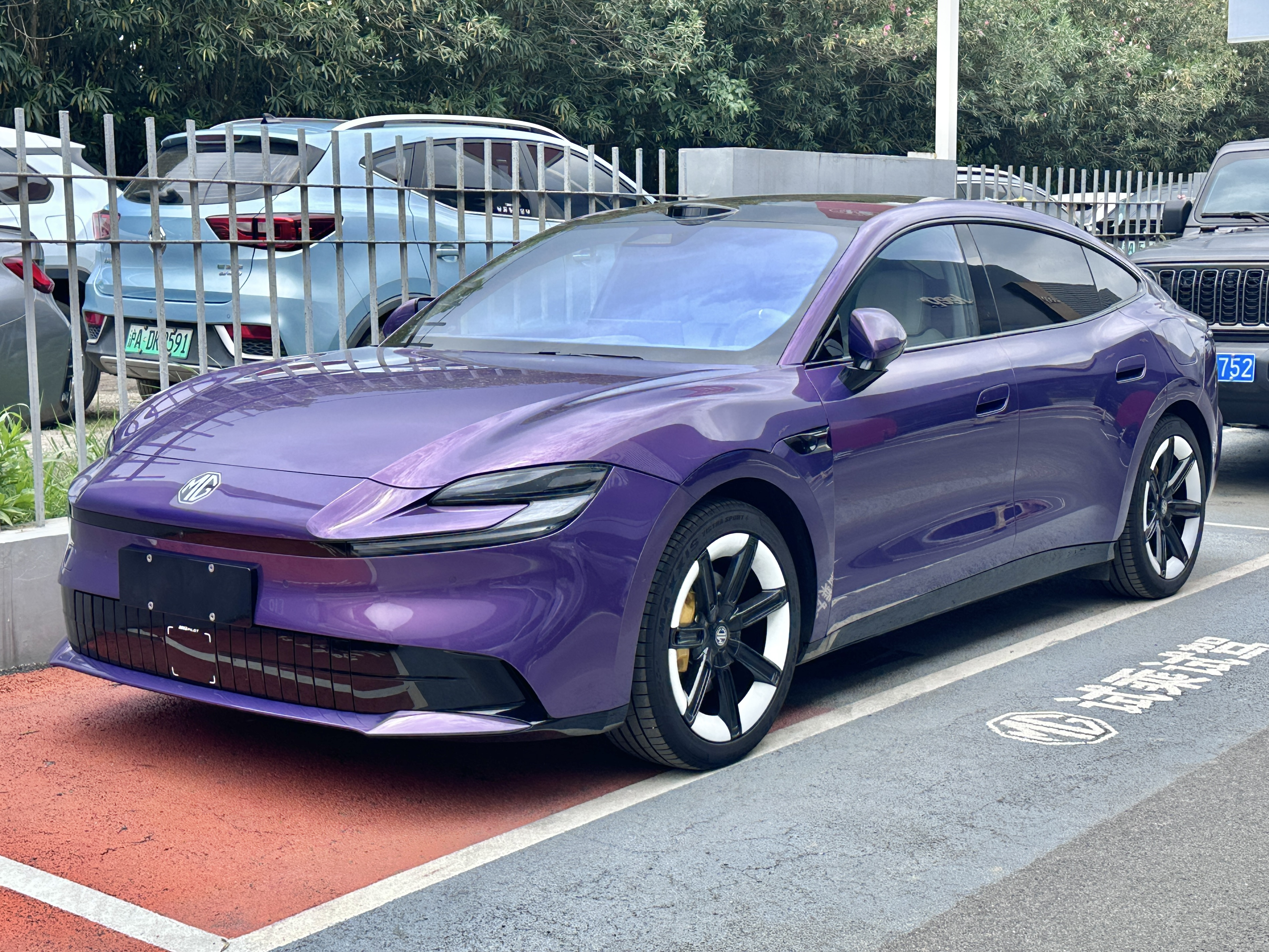
MG 07 (2026–present)

== Operations ==
=== Development ===
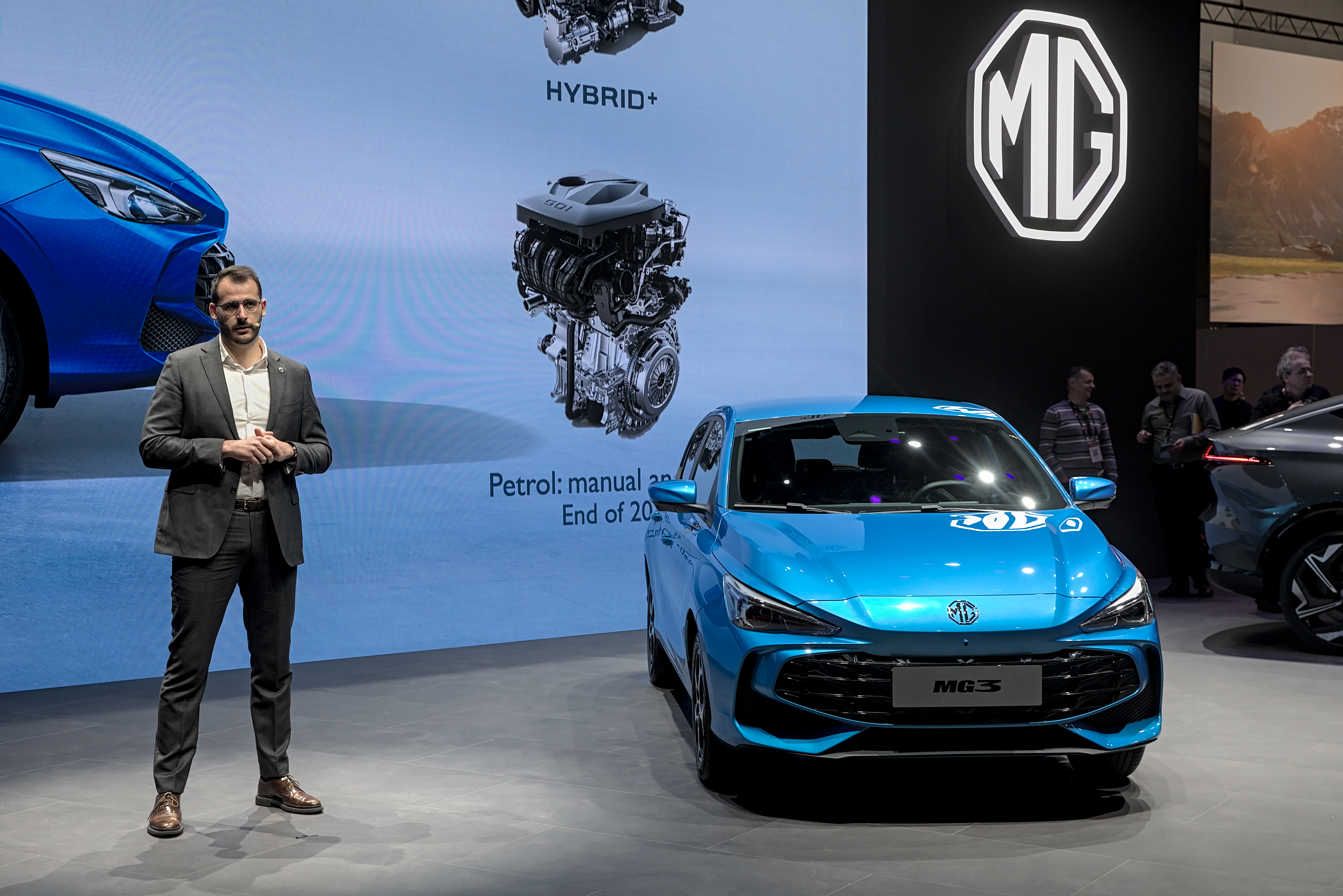
The third generation MG 3 is unveiled at the Geneva International Motor Show, 2024

MG Motor cars were once engineered by SAIC at the Longbridge plant facility in Birmingham, United Kingdom. Longbridge was formerly home to Austin, British Leyland, Rover Group and, later, the MG Rover Group. Currently, most of the design, development and R&D takes place in China by SAIC Motor R&D Innovation Headquarters (SRIH).

The Longbridge facility has been retained as the base to SAIC Motor Technical Centre UK (SMTC), which had significant design and engineering input into SAIC products globally. SMTC once employed around 500 people at its peak. SAIC reduced its presence in Longbridge in 2019 with the large Technical Centre downsized to 20 staff and moved to London. The facility used to host a design studio, before moving to London.

SAIC Design Advanced London at Marylebone Road in London succeeded the Longbridge design studio. Led by Carl Gotham and Robert Lemmens with 20 employees, the studio conducted some key design work for MG vehicles and works in conjunction with the automotive manufacturer's other studios to support future product designs for brands including MG, Roewe and Rising Auto.

Some MG models particularly in India were developed by SAIC-GM-Wuling, a joint venture that is majority owned by SAIC.

=== Production ===
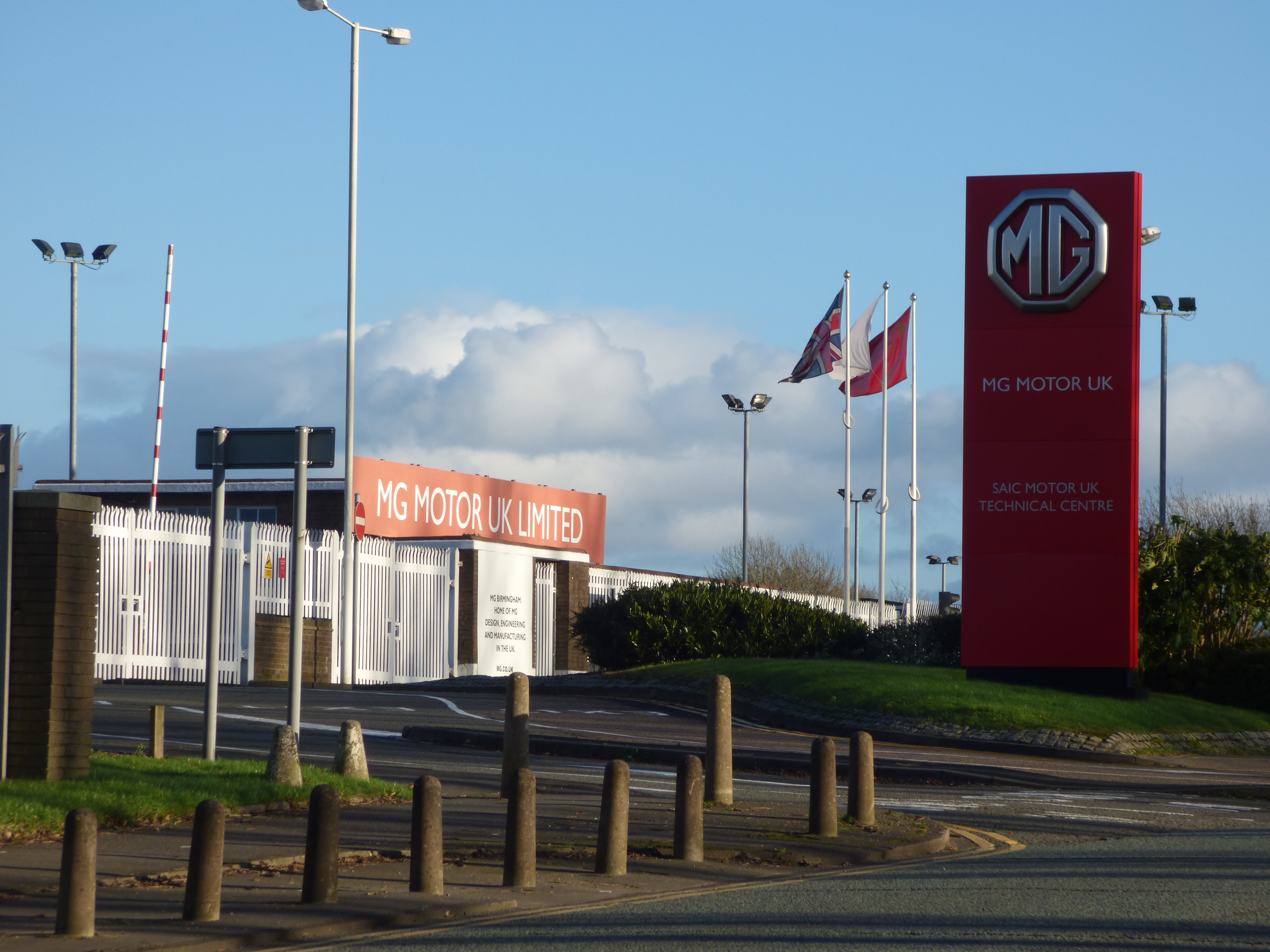
The Longbridge plant, as the MG Motor Technical Centre, in January 2016

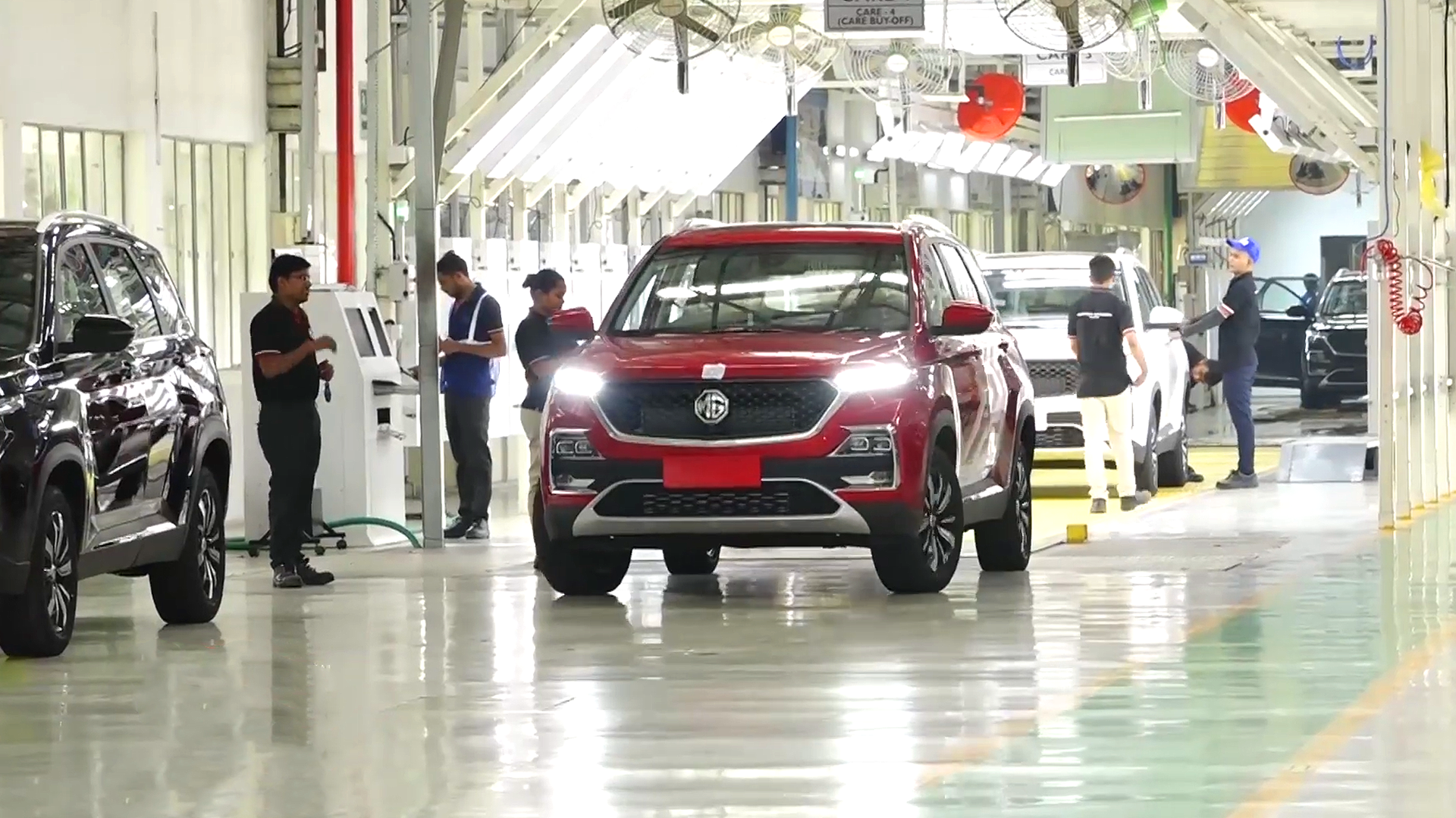
An MG Hector rolling off the production plant at MG Motor India plant in Halol, Gujarat

After MG Rover collapsed, Nanjing Automobile Corporation (NAC) resumed production at the Longbridge plant in 2008. NAC used Longbridge to produce the MG TF, which they mildly redeveloped. SAIC took ownership of the MG brand, and from 2010 onwards, the MG6 was produced in China. From 13 April 2011, MG Motor started producing the MG6 at Longbridge. From 2013, the MG 3 also saw some limited final assembly at the same factory. Activity at Longbridge was later gradually reduced. In September 2016, MG Motor ended production at the Longbridge facility, with Matthew Cheyne, head of sales and marketing at MG Motor UK, citing "moving production abroad was a necessary business decision". Cheyne claimed that the company "did no actual production there", with workers only performing minimal additions for the three models, the MG3, MG6 and MG GS that came as knock-down kits. 25 employees were made redundant as a result of the move and other employees moved to different areas. This marked the end of MG production in the UK, and production was fully moved to China.

In December 2017, MG Motor opened its first overseas plant outside China in UK in Chonburi, Thailand. The plant was established and operated by a joint venture between SAIC Motor and Charoen Pokphand, a Thai conglomerate company. The plant has a total annual production capacity of 100,000 units. The new plant replaced an older plant located in Rayong that was used since 2014, which had an annual production capacity of 50,000 units and had been closed since. In 2022, the facility exported 6,684 vehicles to Vietnam and Indonesia.

In 2019, SAIC Motor opened its fourth factory in China located in Ningde, Fujian, that is mainly used for producing and exporting MG vehicles. It is SAIC’s fourth factory in China, after plants in Shanghai, Nanjing and Zhengzhou. The 5-billion yuan ($702 million) factory is capable of producing up to 240,000 vehicles a year at full capacity, increasing SAIC's annual production capacity in China from 740,000 to 980,000 vehicles. The first vehicle produced in the plant was the plug-in hybrid version of the MG HS.

=== Marketing ===
In most markets outside UK and Europe, MG vehicles are fitted with a "Brit Dynamics" emblem, as part of the "Brit Dynamics" marketing campaign that highlights "British" engineering, styling and driving behaviour. Starting 2016, MG is a sponsorship partner of football club Liverpool F.C. Initially a regional partnership for the Chinese market, since July 2019 MG extended their existing long-term regional relationship to incorporate global markets. The partnership ended in mid-2022. In January 2024, MG Motor UK announced a multi-year sponsorship with London football club Arsenal F.C. Previously, MG Motor has previously sponsored Copa Sudamericana, the secondary pan-continental clubs competition in South America, as well as French football club Olympique Lyonnais.

== Markets ==
=== Australia ===
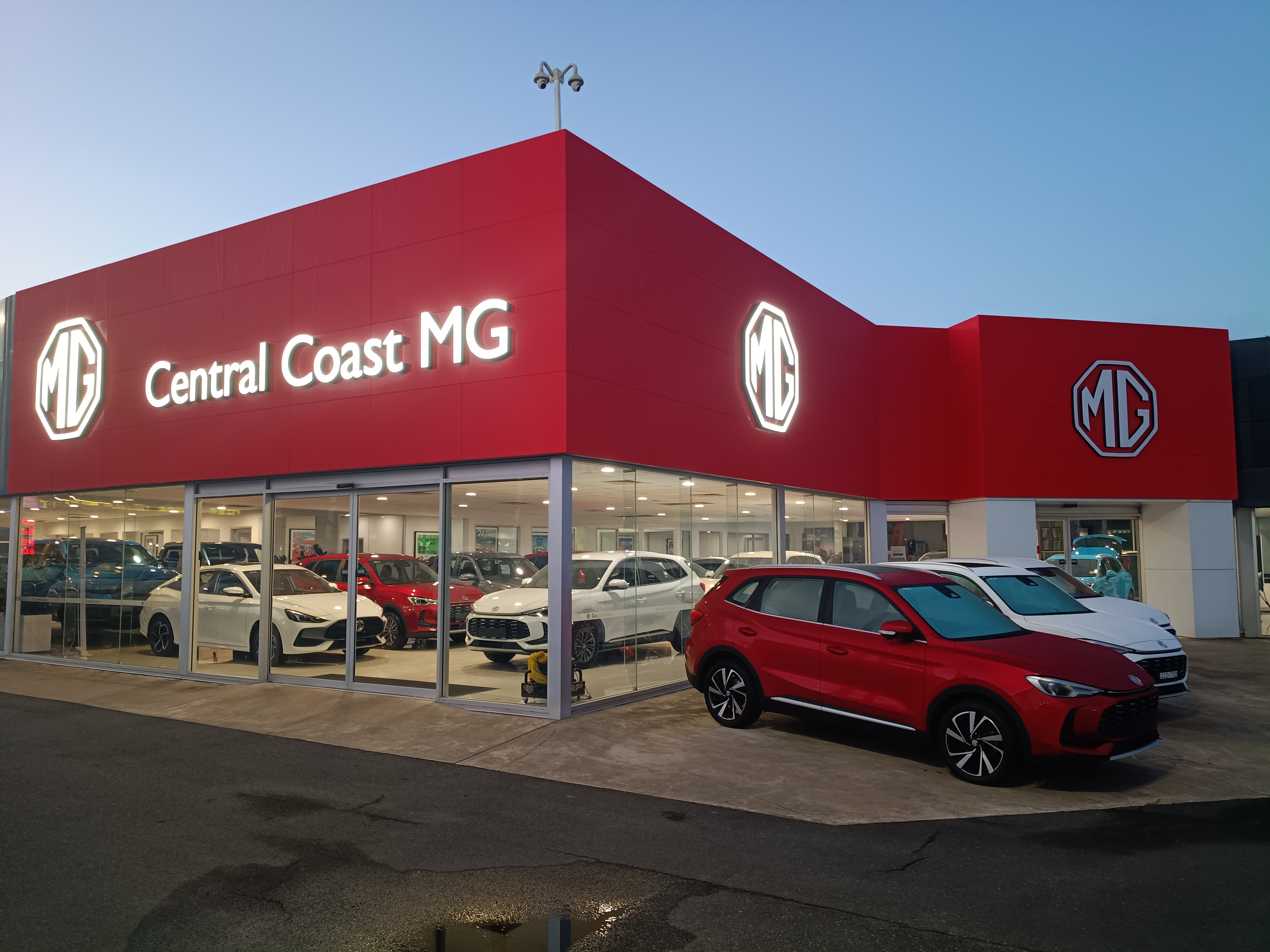
MG Central Coast dealership in West Gosford, New South Wales, Australia.

MG Motor started selling cars in Australia since 2013 through a direct factory-backed operation, instead of local distributor-led operation. Between 2013 and 2016, the brand sold a single model, the MG6, with the MG3, MG6, and the GS joining in 2016. In the country, the brand went from selling just 600 cars in 2017 to 58,346 units in 2023, becoming the seventh best-selling brand in Australia. The brand's popularity in the country were widely attributed to its competitive pricing.

=== Continental Europe ===
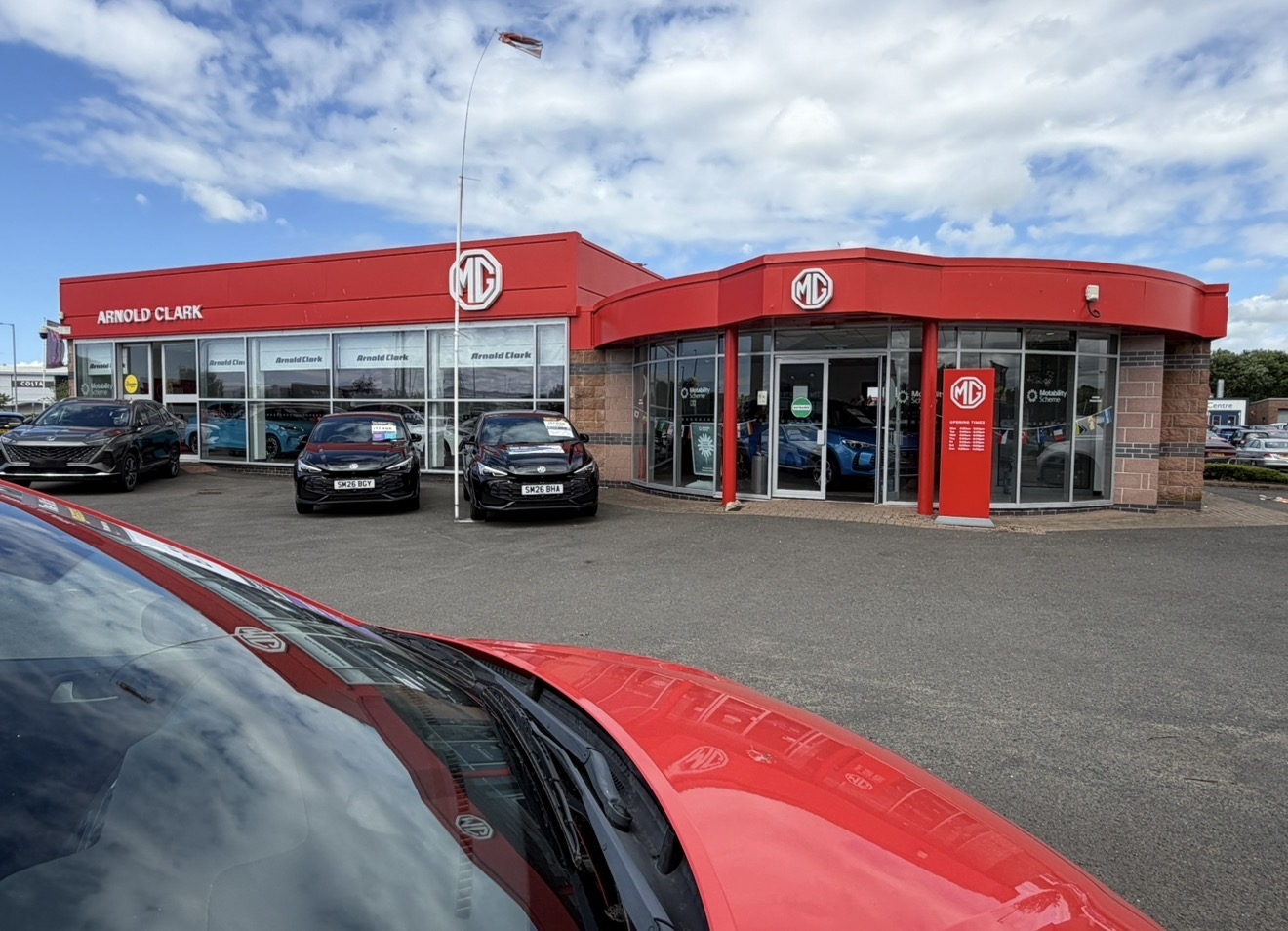
An Arnold Clark MG Motor dealership in Kilmarnock, Scotland

MG Motor started its sales operations in continental Europe in late 2019 separate from its UK operations, when company established SAIC Motor Europe B.V. and a European headquarter in the Netherlands. In the Netherlands, MG started selling the ZS EV in late 2019, and also sells its models through the Woonexpress home furnishings group's outlets. In February 2020, MG entered Norway, which has a mature electric vehicle market. Later that year, MG expanded to Austria, Belgium, Denmark, France, Iceland, and Luxembourg. In 2021, MG entered Germany, Italy, Spain, Sweden and Portugal. In November 2022, MG Motor merged its European and UK operations into a single business.

During the first half of 2023, MG and Tesla were the two brands with the largest growth in Europe. According to JATO Dynamics, the brand registered 104,300 vehicles in H1 2023, a growth of 128 percent compared to H1 2022. The sales increase was attributed to the introduction of the popular MG4 EV. Electric vehicles are MG Motor's strength in the market, as unlike other manufacturers, SAIC is not restricted on traction battery supply and production volume.

In July 2023, Yu De, general manager of SAIC's international business department stated that Europe market is will be SAIC's largest overseas market, with annual vehicle sales predicted to surpass 200,000 units in the longer term. The company indicated that it is studying plans to establish a manufacturing base in Europe. As of July 2023, MG Motor asserted its position of not having official presence in the Russian market, due to the complications of the Russian invasion of Ukraine.

MG Motor top 10 largest markets, 2023
Rank	Location	Vehicle sales
1	China	99,441
2	United Kingdom	81,289
3	Mexico	60,128
4	Australia	58,346
5	India	49,229
6	France	33,374
7	Italy	30,254
8	Thailand	29,176
9	Spain	29,048
10	Germany	21,230

In June 2024, the European Commission imposed an additional 38.1 percent import duty on top of the existing 15 percent to SAIC Motor electric vehicles imported to the European Union, including MG Motor, following EU's anti-subsidy investigation into SAIC and other Chinese manufacturers. The tariffs subjected to SAIC vehicles are the highest among Chinese electric vehicle manufacturers that are affected. SAIC MG released a statement condemning the decision, noting that the tariffs are a form of unfair market discrimination that went against the principles of free trade. MG reported that it delivered 231,818 vehicles in the European market in 2023. On 26 June, after receiving more information from the SAIC, the EU reduced the proposed tariffs from 38.1 percent to 37.6 percent. In July 2024, SAIC issued a statement stating that it would formally request the European Commission to hold a hearing on the anti-subsidy investigation.

It was reported that 7 out of every 10 cars exported from China to Europe in 2024 (up to September) are from MG. Zhu Yong, the deputy general manager of SAIC Passenger Vehicle, remarked that, "we don't make money in China, but we can still make money internationally even if tariffs are added."

=== Russia ===
MG Motor debuted in Russia in April 2024. MG vehicles in Russia are distributed by local company Mir-Distributor.

=== India ===
MG-branded vehicles are manufactured and distributed by MG Motor India, a SAIC Motor subsidiary, which was established in 2017 and started operations in 2019. The company acquired a former General Motors facility in Halol, Gujarat. It is the only region where MG acquired models from SAIC-GM-Wuling, such as the MG Hector, MG Comet EV and MG Windsor EV which are rebadged Baojun 530, Wuling Air EV and Baojun Yunduo respectively.

In November 2023, the company entered into a strategic joint venture with JSW Group, which allowed the latter to acquire 35% in the company due to restriction by the Indian government of receiving funding from China. Following the tie-up, the company was renamed to JSW MG Motor India.

=== Mexico ===
MG Motor entered the Mexican market in late 2020. From October 2020 to April 2021, the brand opened 34 dealerships in the country and has sold over 2,000 vehicles. In 2023, the brand sold 60,128 units in the country, representing an increase of 25 percent compared to 2022. In that year, MG became the eighth best-selling brand in Mexico with a market share of 4.4 percent.

=== Middle East ===
MG vehicles officially sold in the GCC market are imported and distributed by Auto Class Cars in Qatar, Inter Emirates Motors in the UAE, Zayani Motors of Bahrain, Jiad Modern Motors of Saudi Arabia, Mohsin Haider Darwish of Oman and Adel Alghanim Automotive in Kuwait.

=== Morocco ===
MG vehicles are being distributed in Morocco by Abdul Latif Jameel since early 2023, making it MG Motors’ first market on the African continent under its current incarnation.

=== Pakistan ===
MG vehicles are assembled and distributed in Pakistan by MG JW Automobile Pakistan, part of local company JW Auto Park owned by local businessman Javed Afridi. In 2020, it introduced three SUVs in Pakistan, namely the MG HS, ZS and ZS EV. The company set up an assembly plant in Raiwind, Lahore, which also assembles MG electric cars alongside the petrol-powered cars.

=== Southeast Asia ===
==== Thailand ====
MG vehicles in Thailand are locally assembled in Chonburi by SAIC Motor-CP Co., Ltd., a joint venture between SAIC Motor (51 percent) Thai conglomerate Charoen Pokphand (49 percent). MG vehicles are distributed in Thailand by MG Sales (Thailand) Co., Ltd. The brand debuted in the country in March 2014 at the Bangkok Motor Show.

==== Indonesia ====
MG Motor entered the Indonesian market in March 2020 under PT SAIC Motor Indonesia, a subsidiary of SAIC. In February 2024, MG Motor started assembling electric vehicles in a facility owned by another SAIC subsidiary, SGMW Motor Indonesia, which include the MG4 EV and MG ZS EV.

==== Philippines ====
MG operated in the Philippine market in 2015 until 2018 under Morris Garages Philippines. From October 2018 to July 2023, The Covenant Car Company, Inc. (TCCCI) was the distributor and importer of MG brand vehicles, with a network of 42 dealerships nationwide. On 1 August 2023, SAIC Motor Philippines, Inc. (SMP), a subsidiary of SAIC became the new distributor and importer of MG products and services, with a total of 44 MG-branded dealerships across the country.

==== Singapore ====
In Singapore, Eurokars Group was appointed the official distributor of MG cars in October 2019 and launched two models, the electric MG ZS EV and the MG HS SUV, at the 2020 Singapore Motorshow.

== Motorsport ==
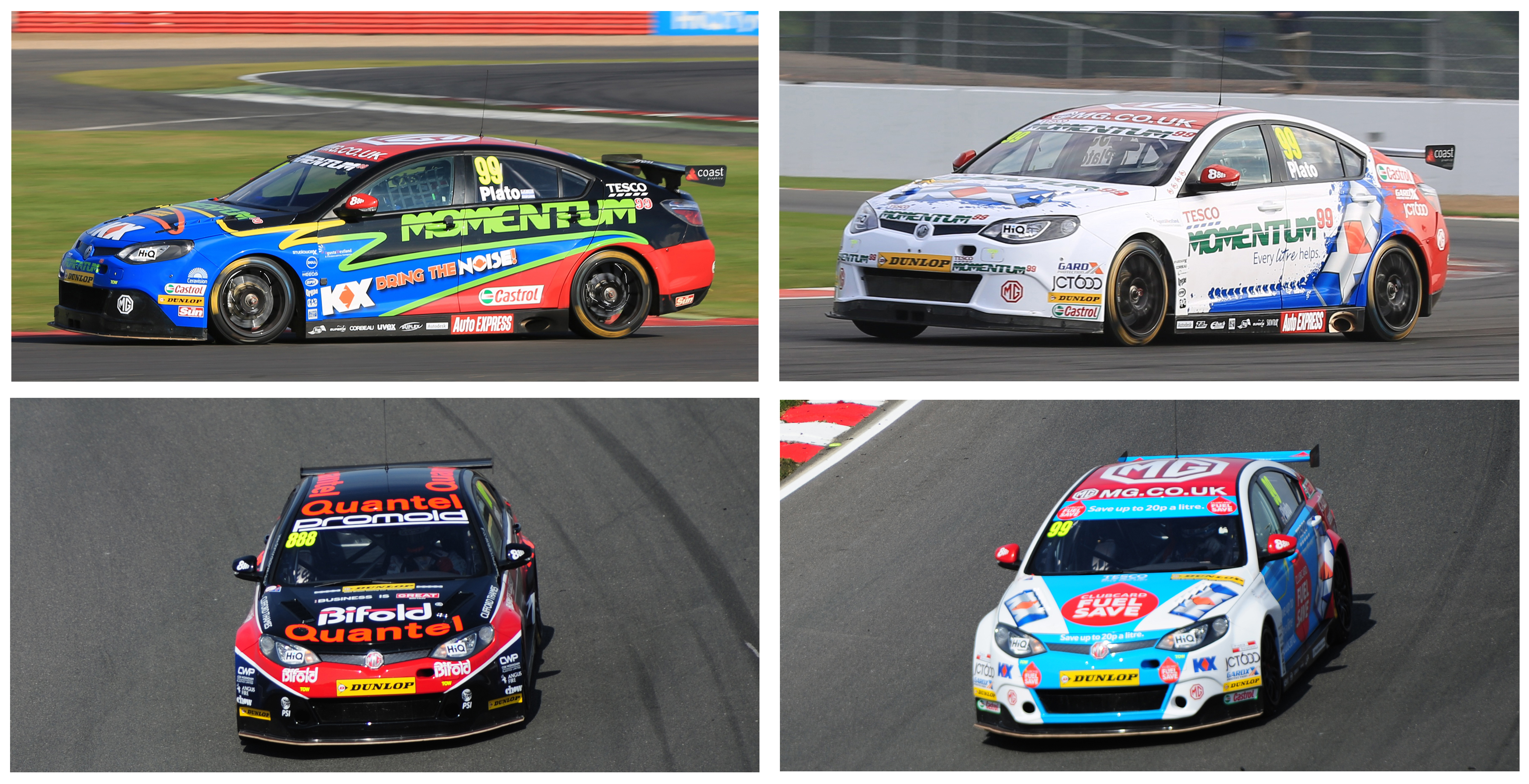
MG / Triple Eight British Touring Cars 2012–2014

In January 2012, MG Motor announced that it would enter the 2012 British Touring Car Championship through the newly established MG KX Momentum Racing team. In its debut season the team ran two MG6s driven by Jason Plato and Andy Neate. Plato ended the season in third place, with the car yet to find its feet in wet conditions.

The team returned in 2013, with Sam Tordoff driving, who performed well in his debut year having joined through the KX Academy scheme. Plato once again came third, with Tordoff sixth.

MG / Triple Eight British Touring Cars 2016

In 2014, MG won the Manufacturer's Championship to break Honda's four-year reign. After just three years of competition, the MG6 GT sealed the title by 95 points at the season finale at Brands Hatch.

Drivers Plato and Tordoff racked up seven wins and 20 podiums in the 30-race calendar. Plato finished the Driver's Championship in second place, behind Colin Turkington, while Tordoff finished seventh. The 2014 season also saw a third MG6 GT on the grid, driven by Marc Hynes and also maintained by Triple Eight but in a new livery which did not resemble the other two MG cars. Hynes finished his debut season in 18th.

For the 2015 campaign, MG fought to regain the Manufacturers / Constructors title with a new driver lineup. 2013 Champion Andrew Jordan and young gun Jack Goff paired up in the MG6 to fight against Honda, BMW and Infiniti for the title. MG finished second in the Manufacturers / Constructors title challenge, with Andrew and Jack in fifth and ninth position, respectively, in the drivers' standings.

MG announced a new three-year contract extension with Triple Eight Racing for the 2016 BTCC campaign. The team plan was to bring in young and up-and-coming drivers with an intention to grow its own champion over the duration of the contract. Josh Cook, a former 2014 Renault UK Clio Cup Vice-Champion, and BTCC 2015 Jack Sears Trophy winner (award for the top rookie) and Ashley Sutton, graduating to BTCC after leaving the Renault Clio Cup as reigning 2015 champion, were announced as the new line up for MG. After a hard-fought campaign the MG drivers finished in 12th and 13th place, respectively, with Ash picking up the Jack Sears Trophy for the top rookie.

Another new driver lineup was introduced for the 2017 season as Árón Taylor-Smith and Daniel Lloyd drove the MG6 cars. The season was a disaster, with not a single win or podium finish to show for their efforts. Lloyd left the team after four meetings and Josh Cook was brought back to help improve results, whilst Taylor-Smith was withdrawn from the Croft rounds of the championship after being involved in a multi-car accident during the wet qualifying session at the circuit, the Irishman struggled thereafter, picking up just six further points all season. Cook was ultimately the highest placed of the MG drivers in the championship, but only in 18th (that includes the points he obtained when driving for Maximum Motorsport before returning to MG), and the team finished a distant last in the manufacturers standings.

Triple Eight merged their operations with BMR Racing for 2018, and therefore MG exited the championship again as a manufacturer. The MG6 continued to be used for a further two seasons, firstly by AmD Tuning in 2018, and then by Excelr8 Motorsport in 2019, with rather limited success in both years.

== Sales ==
MG sales by countries
Calendar year	China	UK	Europe incl. UK	India	Mexico	Australia	Thailand	Chile	Philippines
2007	3,131		-	-	-	-	-	-	-
2008	9,361	133	-	-	-	-	-	-	-
2009	13,785	374	374	-	-	-	-	-	-
2010	29,216	282	285	-	-	-	-	-	-
2011	50,191	360	362	-	-	-	-	-	-
2012	72,516	782	787	-	-	-	-	-	-
2013	74,684	504	513	-	-	-	-	-	-
2014	52,217	2,326	2,326	-	-	-	204	-	-
2015	70,377	3,152	3,157	-	-	-	3,779	-	-
2016	80,389	4,192	4,194	-	-	-	8,319	-	-
2017	134,786	4,192	4,442	-	-	-	12,013	3,035	-
2018	256,084	9,049	9,050	-	-	3,007	23,740	5,406	-
2019	269,751	14,061	14,061	-	-	8,326	26,516	8,386	5,085
2020	297,317	18,415	25,199	28,162	-	15,253	28,316	10,789	3,542
2021	456,243	30,600	52,546	40,273	8,699	39,025	31,005	20,846	6,343
2022	170,236	51,050	113,672	48,063	23,574	49,582	24,466	20,301	7,856
2023	99,441	81,289	231,818	49,229	60,128	58,346	29,176	11,657	10,110
2024	84,943	81,536	243,449	61,214	60,168	50,592	16,156	11,660	9,016
2025	131,712	85,155	307,164	70,555	48,575	41,298	23,199	9,562	8,715

== See also ==
- SAIC Motor
- List of MG vehicles
- Automobile manufacturers and brands of China
- List of automobile manufacturers of China
- List of car manufacturers of the United Kingdom
- Automotive industry in the United Kingdom
