= SAIC Volkswagen =

Chinese joint venture car company

Coordinates: 31°17′45″N 121°10′40″E

SAIC Volkswagen Automotive Co., Ltd.

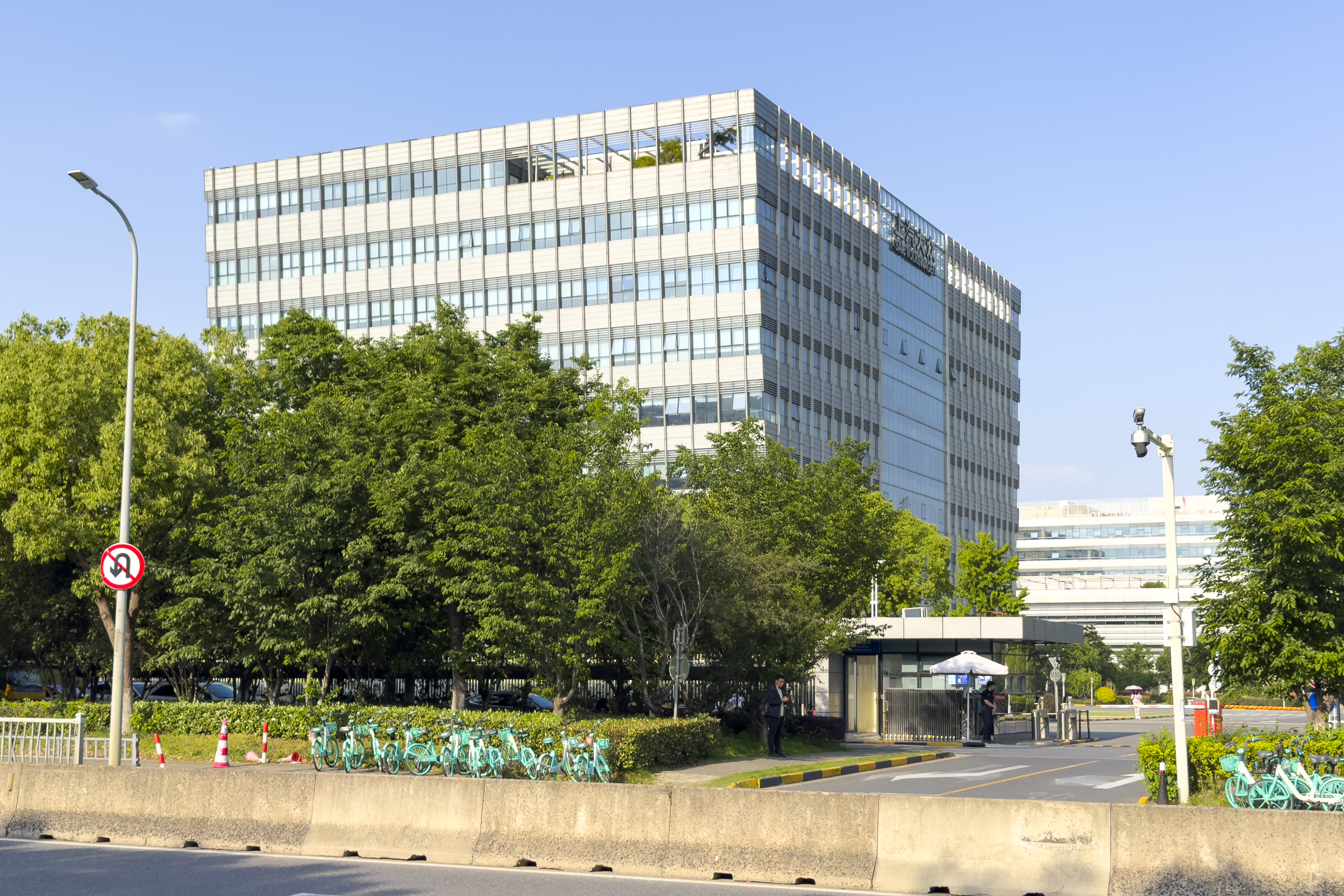
- Headquarters in Anting, Jiading, Shanghai
- Type: Joint venture
- Industry: Automotive
- Founded: 12 October 1984; 42 years ago
- Headquarters: Anting, Jiading District, Shanghai, China
- Area served: China
- Key people: Chen Hong (chairman); Chen Xianzhang (president)
- Products: Automobiles, engines
- Brands: Volkswagen; Audi; AUDI (sub-brand)
- Owners: SAIC Motor (50%); Volkswagen AG (39%); Volkswagen (China) Invest (10%); Audi AG (1%)
- Subsidiaries: Shanghai SAIC Volkswagen Sales Co. Ltd.

Chinese name
- Simplified Chinese: 上汽大众汽车有限公司
- Traditional Chinese: 上汽大眾汽車有限公司
Transcriptions
Standard Mandarin
- Hanyu Pinyin: Shàngqì Dàzhòng Qìchē Yǒuxiàn Gōngsī

SAIC Volkswagen
- Simplified Chinese: 上汽大众
- Traditional Chinese: 上汽大眾
Transcriptions
Standard Mandarin
- Hanyu Pinyin: Shàngqì Dàzhòng
- Website: www.csvw.com

SAIC Volkswagen Automotive Co., Ltd., formerly known as Shanghai Volkswagen Automotive Co., Ltd. is an automobile manufacturing company headquartered in Anting, Shanghai, China and a joint venture between SAIC Motor and Volkswagen Group. It was founded in 1984 and produces cars under the Volkswagen and Audi marques. It is the second automobile manufacturing joint venture in China after American Motors and the first German car manufacturer to enter China.

The joint venture is made up of equity from SAIC Motor (50%), Volkswagen AG (40%), Volkswagen (China) Invest (10%), with a fixed-term venture for 45 years up until 2030. It is the first of three joint ventures operated by Volkswagen in China, alongside FAW-Volkswagen with FAW Group and Volkswagen Anhui with JAC Group.

== History ==
In November 1978, the first delegation headed by Zhou Zijian, then Minister of the First Ministry of Machinery Industry, visited the then West Germany Volkswagen. In 1982, China purchased 100 Santana units from Volkswagen and assembled them in Shanghai Automobile Plant for trial. The first Volkswagen Santana produced in Shanghai Automobile Plant was delivered in 1983. On October 10, 1984, the joint venture contract of SAIC Volkswagen Automotive Co., Ltd. was signed in the Great Hall of the People in Beijing. The Chinese and German parties each invested 50% of the company, and the contract period was 25 years. Two days later, Vice Premier Li Peng of the State Council of the People's Republic of China and Chancellor Helmut Kohl of West Germany laid the foundation stone for SAIC Volkswagen. Shanghai Volkswagen began automobile production in 1985. As car imports fell to some 34,000 in 1990, SAIC Volkswagen's production of its Santana models reached nearly 19,000 vehicles that year. By 1993 SAIC Volkswagen's output had reached 100,000 vehicles.

Volkswagen was aided by some Shanghai municipal efforts. Various restrictions on engine size, as well as incentives to city taxi companies, helped ensure a safe market in the company's relatively wealthy home arena. The Shanghai plant was by far the winner among all new JVs, as it produced cars that could function as taxis, vehicles for government officials and transport for the newly emerging business elite. Volkswagen also encouraged its foreign parts suppliers to create joint ventures in China, and their resulting product helped SAIC Volkswagen achieve an 85 per cent local content rate by 1993. In May 2018, SAIC Volkswagen started to export the Santana, Lavida, Lamando, and Tiguan to the Philippines as part of the new ASEAN-China Free Trade Agreement (ACFTA). The joint venture was also in the process of building an electric-car plant in Anting, near Shanghai by late 2018; it was expected to make 300,000 e-vehicles per year, starting in 2020.

On 12 April 2002, SAIC Motor renewed its contract with Volkswagen and extended the term of cooperation for another 20 years. Chinese Communist Party former general secretary Jiang Zemin attended the signature ceremony. Shanghai Volkswagen Sales Co. Ltd, established on 19 October 2000, as the first joint venture in vehicle sales in China.

On 11 April 2005, the Czech automotive brand Škoda Auto was introduced after signing a contract. The first model for the brand was the Škoda Octavia built by Shanghai Volkswagen and commenced production on June 6, 2007. This followed with the Škoda Fabia in December 2008, the Superb in August 2009, the Škoda Rapid in April 2013 and the long wheelbase Škoda Yeti seven months later.

To complete the model lineup for the Chinese market, the Škoda Kodiaq was officially listed in March 2017, followed by the Škoda Karoq in January 2018 and the Chinese built Škoda Kamiq six months later.

SAIC Volkswagen started vehicle export shipments in January 2018 which targets left-hand drive Southeast Asian markets. Prior to this, the company briefly exported several hundred Volkswagen Polo sedans to Australia in 2004.

On December 7, 2015, Shanghai Volkswagen was renamed SAIC Volkswagen. After the name change, SAIC Volkswagen will assume all the rights and obligations of the original company, and the company's business scope and business relationships will remain unchanged. In fact, the reason why Shanghai Volkswagen was renamed SAIC Volkswagen is that automobile manufacturers need to comply with the regulations formulated by relevant national departments that "manufacturer brands cannot be named after regions."

In June 2018, Audi acquired a 1% stake in SAIC Volkswagen, which means that SAIC Volkswagen can produce Audi-branded models in the future.

On October 27, 2020, the pure electric vehicle ID.4 X officially went into production.

In mid 2025, SAIC Volkswagen halted production in its Nanjing plant, with plans to close it in the second half of the year. The remaining production will be relocated to the neighboring Yizheng plant.

On March 26, 2026, Škoda Auto announced its withdrawal from the Chinese market due to the transition to electrification and growing competition against local car brands.

== Facilities ==
Name	Location	Founded	Annual capacity	Production
No. 1 Auto Plant	Anting, Shanghai	1984		Volkswagen Polo, Volkswagen Tharu XR, Volkswagen Tiguan, Volkswagen Lavida, Audi A5L Sportback, Audi A7L
No. 2 Auto Plant	Anting, Shanghai	1992		Volkswagen Polo, Volkswagen Tharu XR, Volkswagen Tiguan, Volkswagen Lavida, Audi A5L Sportback, Audi A7L
No. 3 Auto Plant	Anting, Shanghai	1999		Volkswagen Polo, Volkswagen Tharu XR, Volkswagen Tiguan, Volkswagen Lavida, Audi A5L Sportback, Audi A7L
New Energy Vehicle Plant	Anting, Shanghai	2020	300,000 vehicles	Volkswagen ID.3, Volkswagen ID.4 X, Volkswagen ID.6 X, Audi Q5 e-tron
Yizheng Branch	Yizheng, Jiangsu	2012	600,000 vehicles	Volkswagen Tharu, Volkswagen Passat, Volkswagen Passat Pro
Ningbo Plant	Ningbo, Zhejiang	2013	300,000 vehicles	Volkswagen ID. Era 9X, Volkswagen Lamando, Volkswagen Tharu, Volkswagen Teramont, Volkswagen Teramont Pro, Volkswagen Viloran, Audi Q6
Changsha Plant	Changsha, Hunan	2015	300,000 vehicles	Volkswagen Lavida, Volkswagen Touran

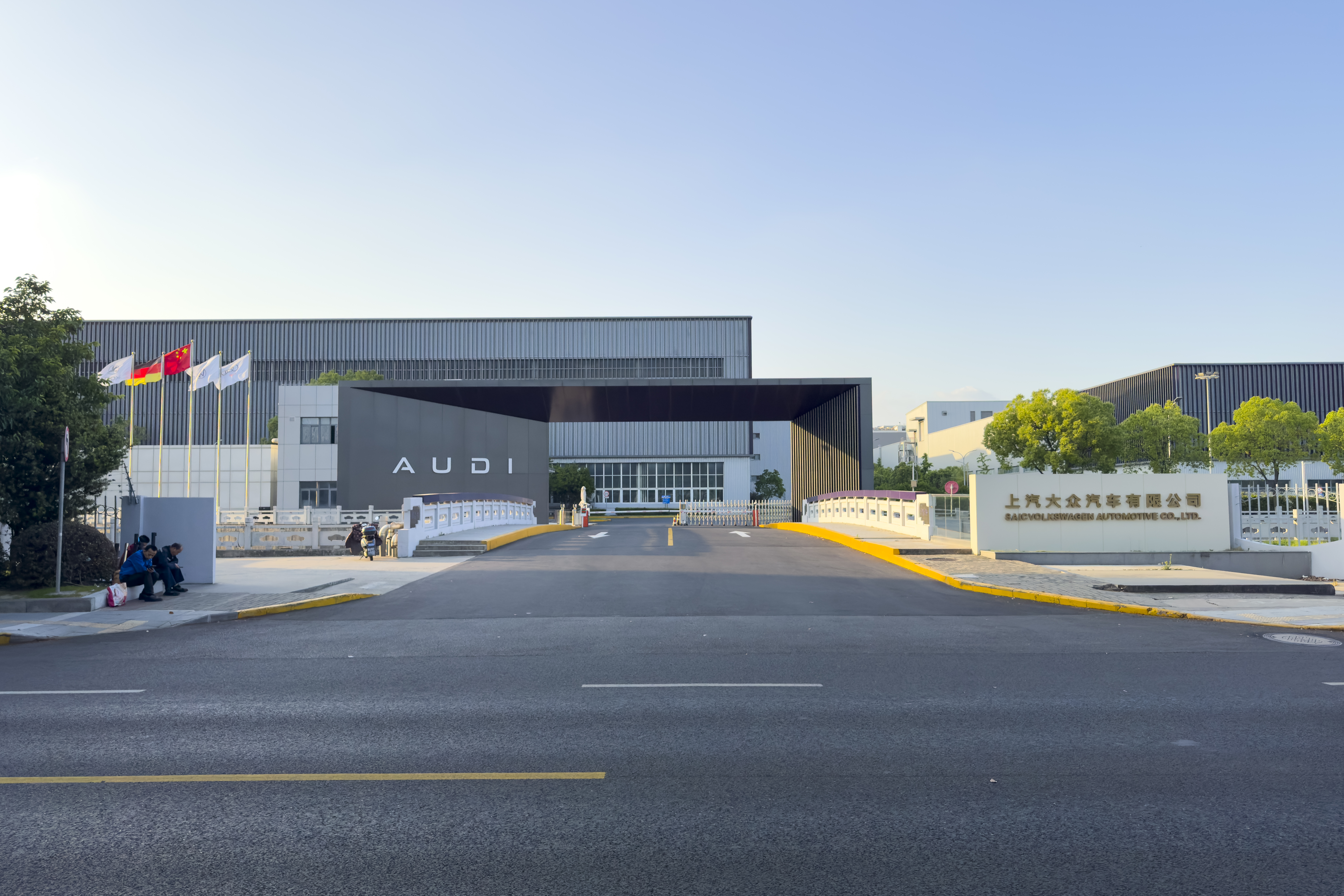
Anting Second Plant (AUDI Intelligent Manufacturing Base)

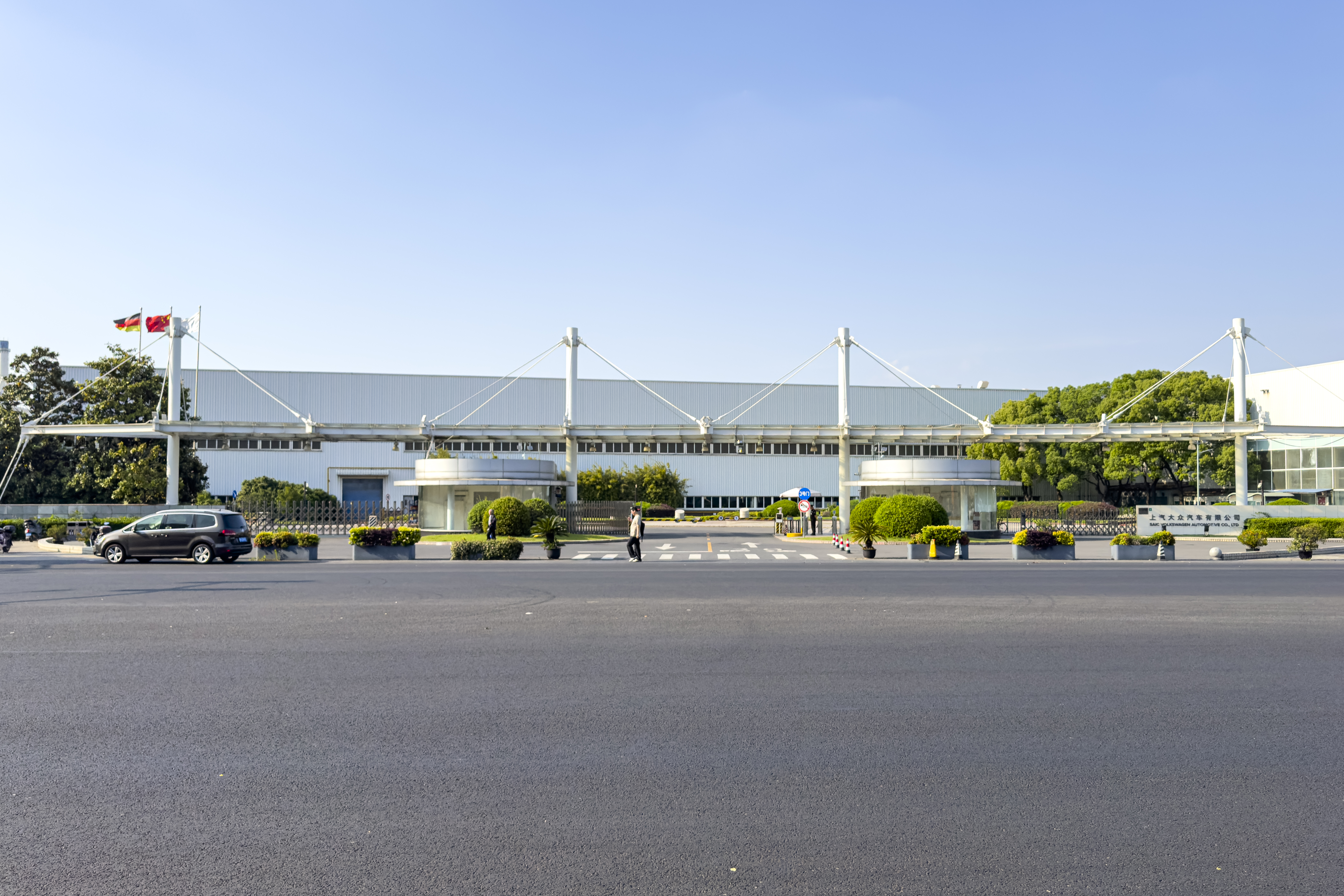
Anting Third Plant

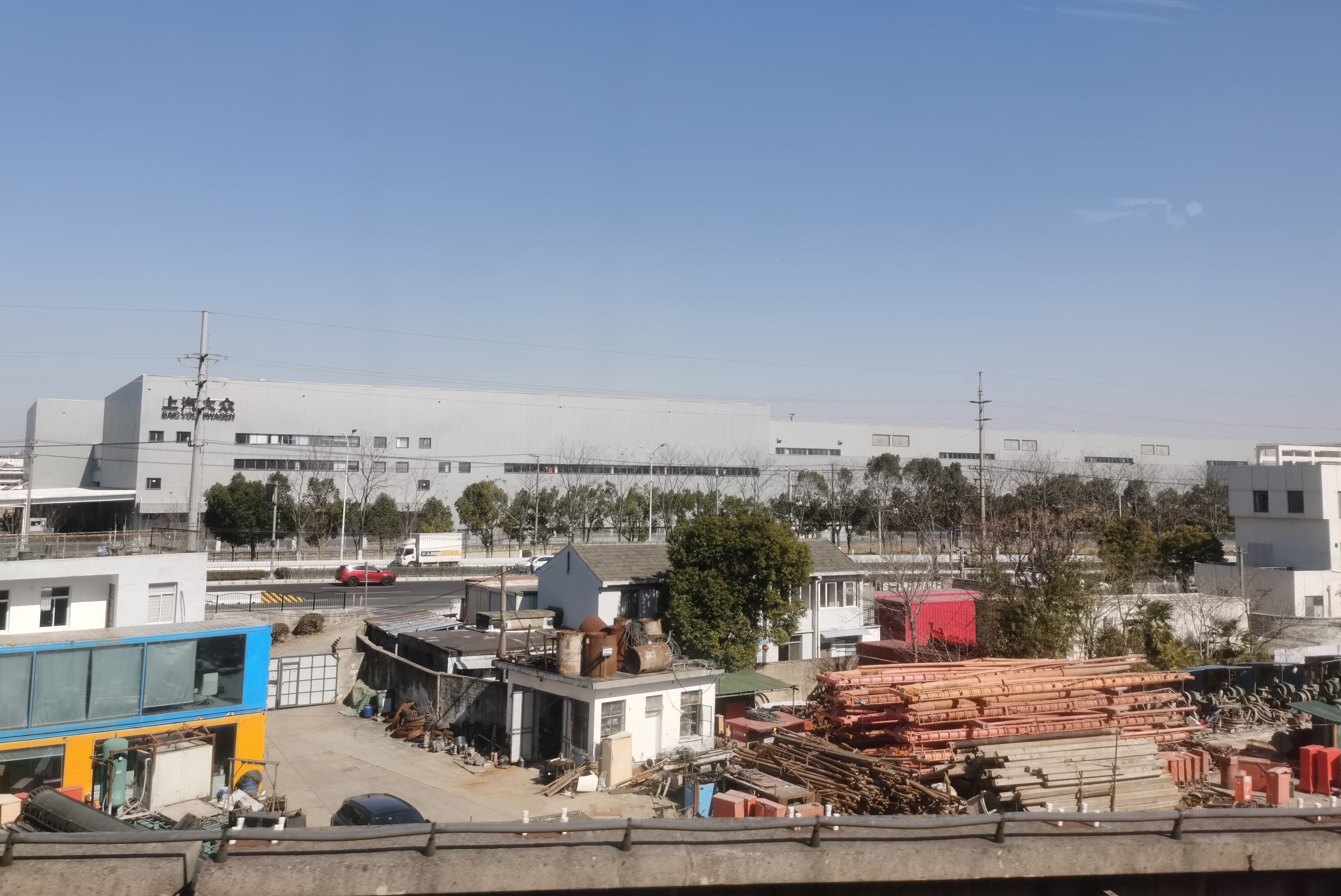
Anting New Energy Vehicle Plant

== Current products ==
=== Audi ===
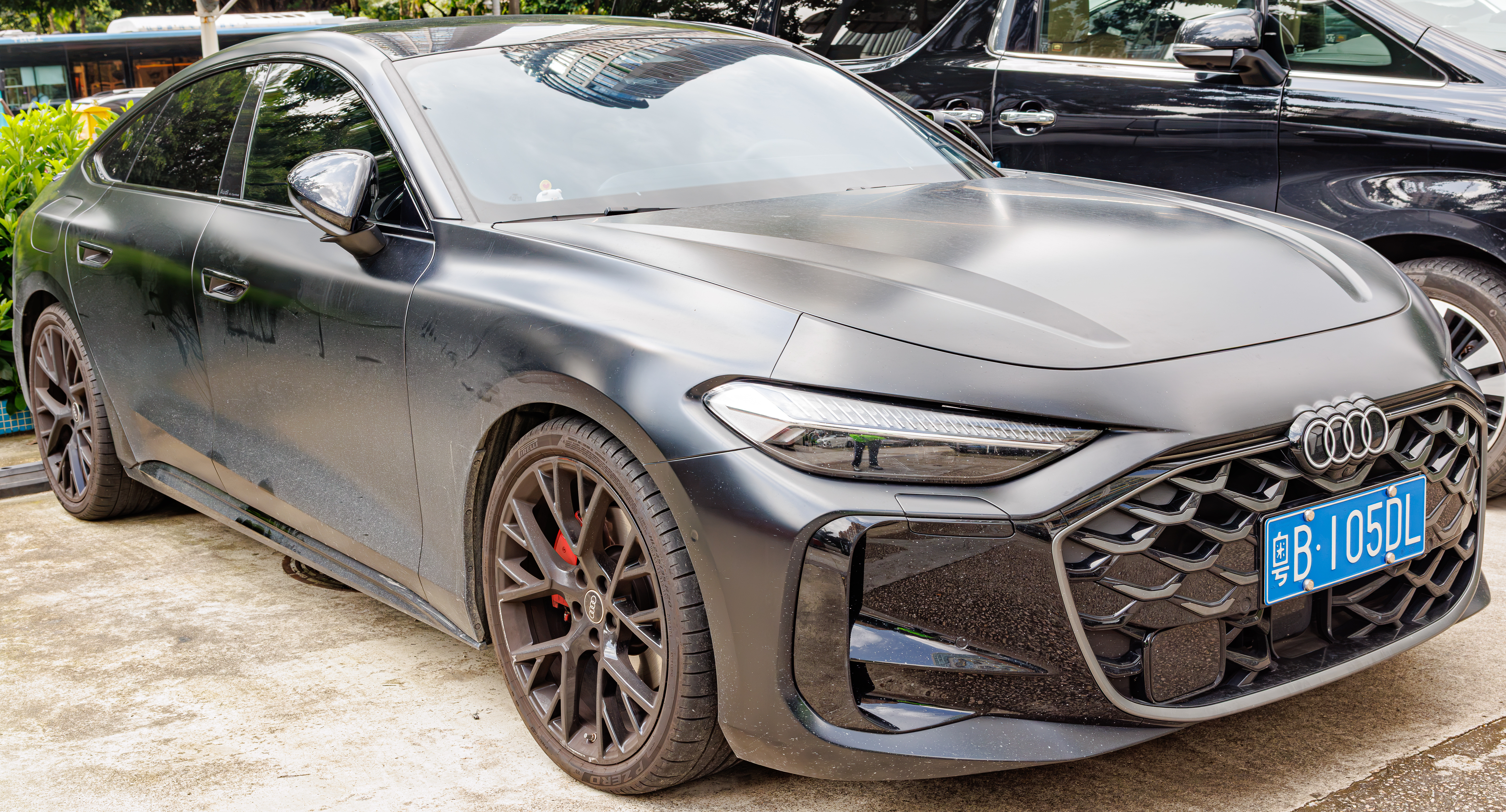
2025–present
奥迪A5L Sportback
Audi A5L Sportback

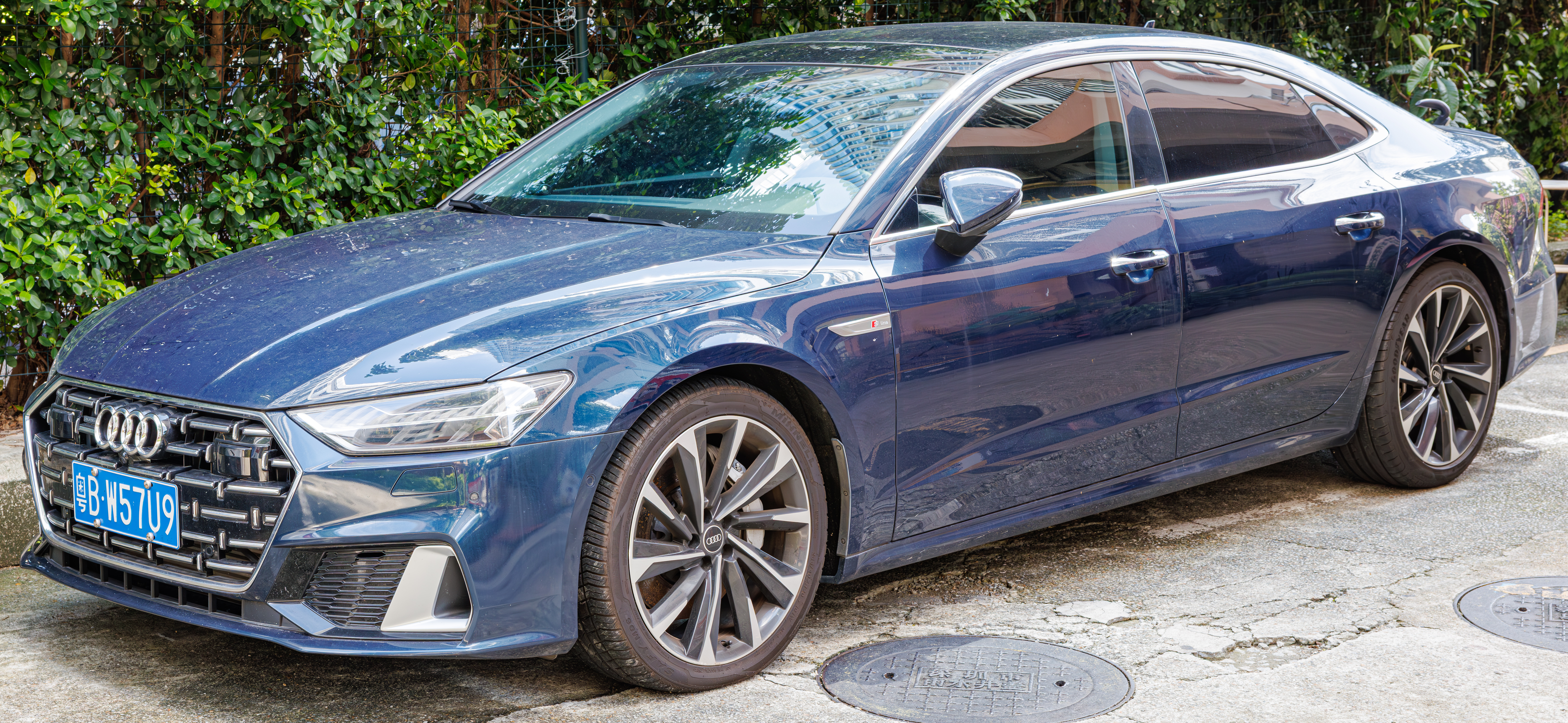
2021–present
奥迪A7L
Audi A7L

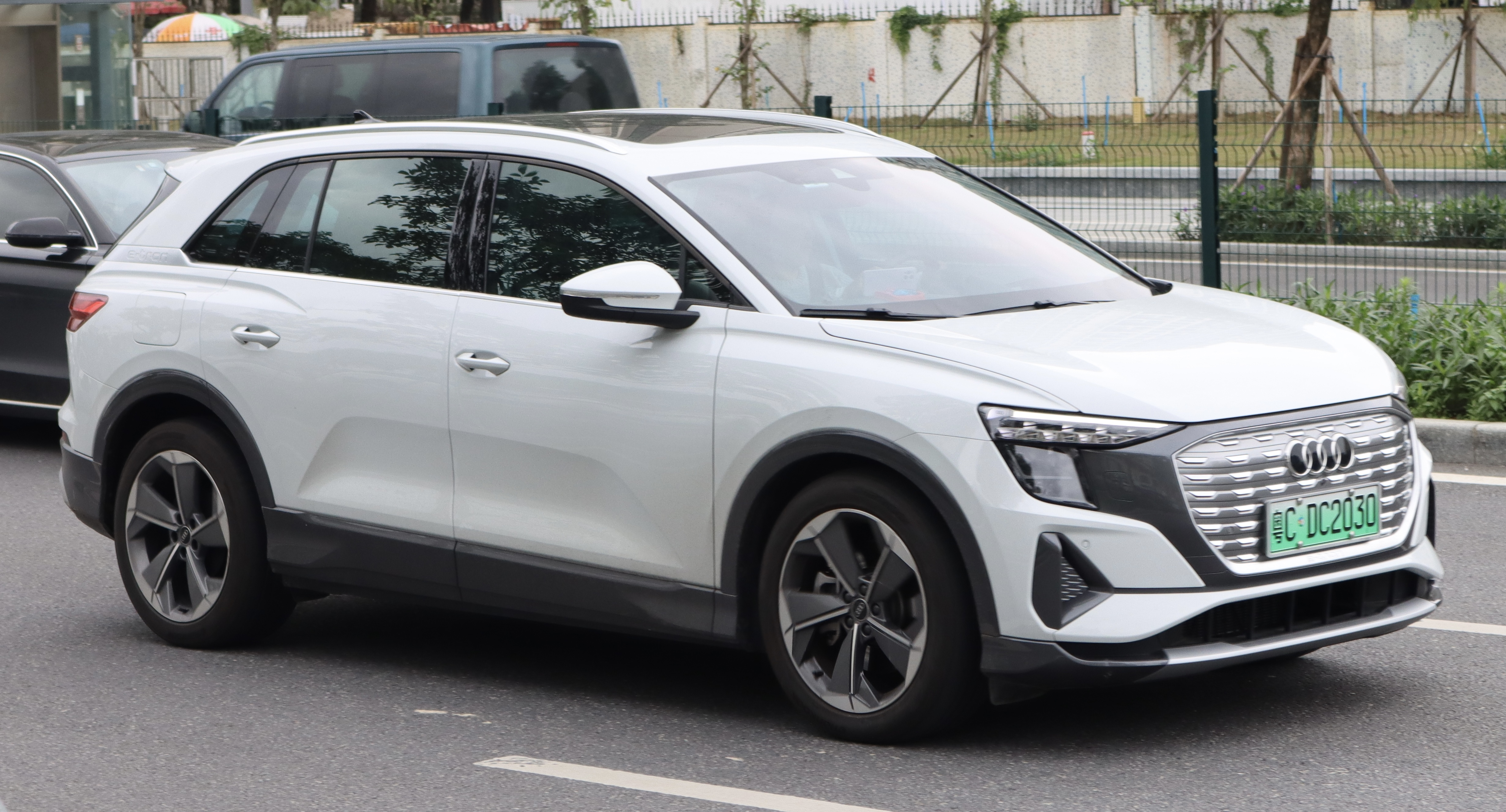
2022–present
奥迪Q5 e-tron
Audi Q5 e-tron

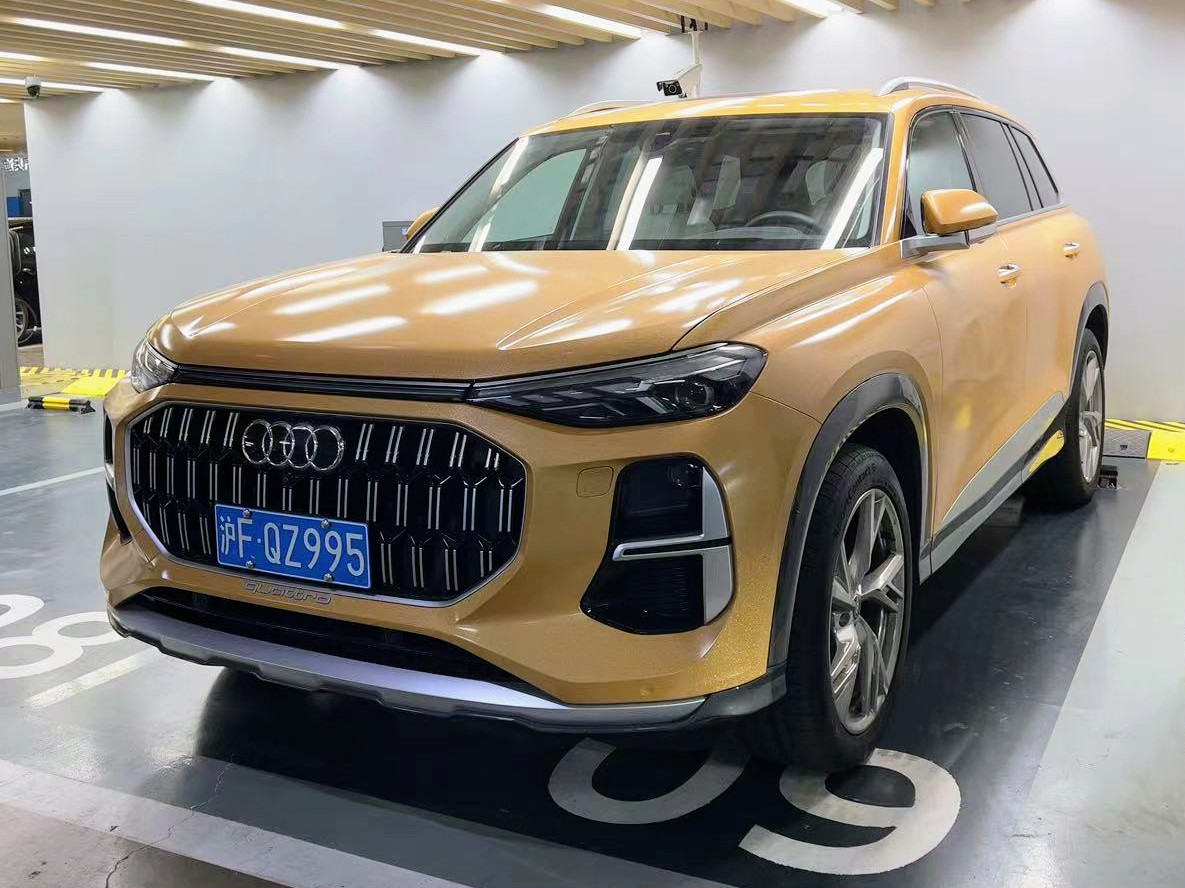
2022–present
奥迪Q6
Audi Q6

=== AUDI ===
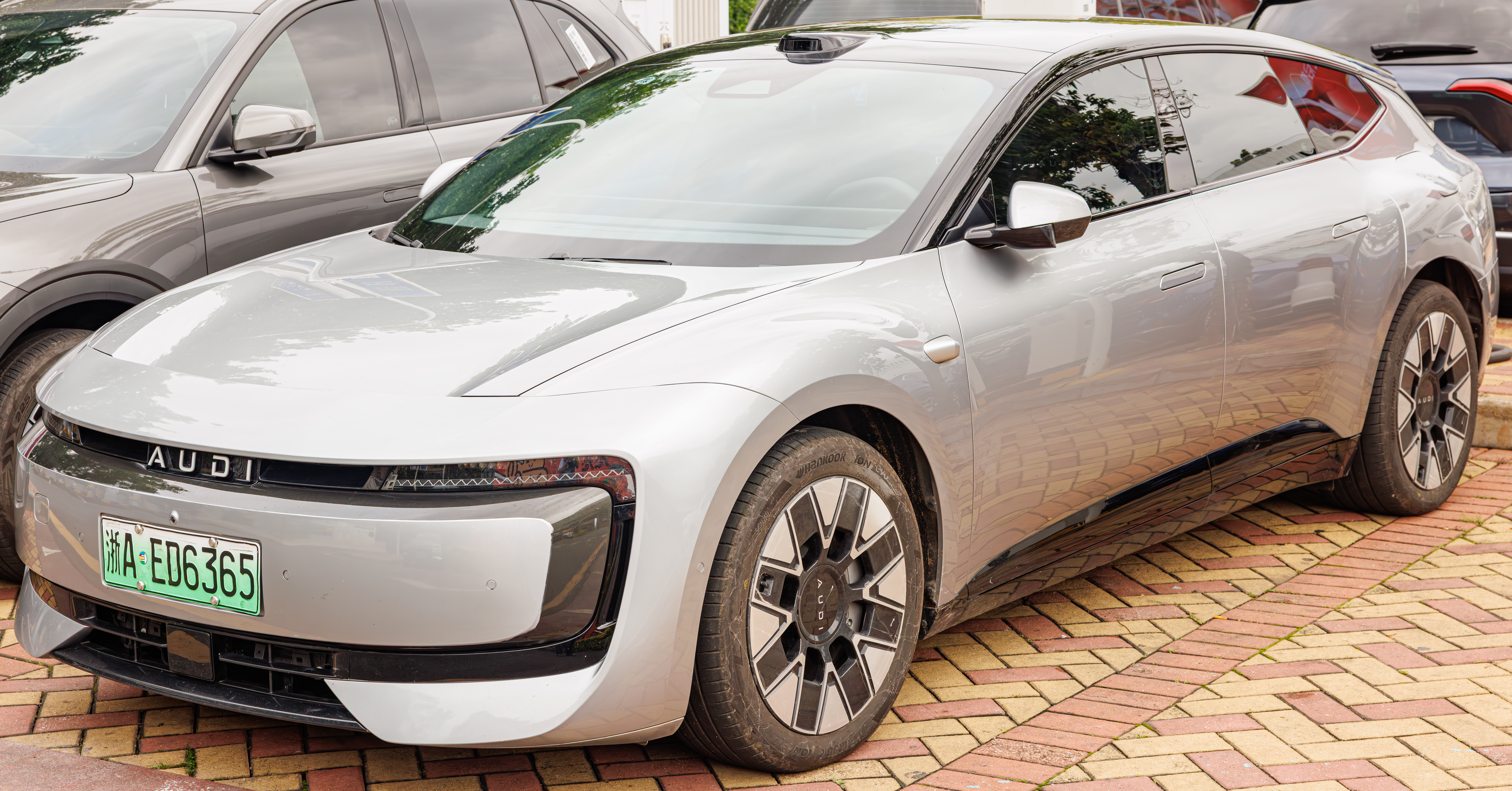
2025–present
奥迪E5
AUDI E5 Sportback

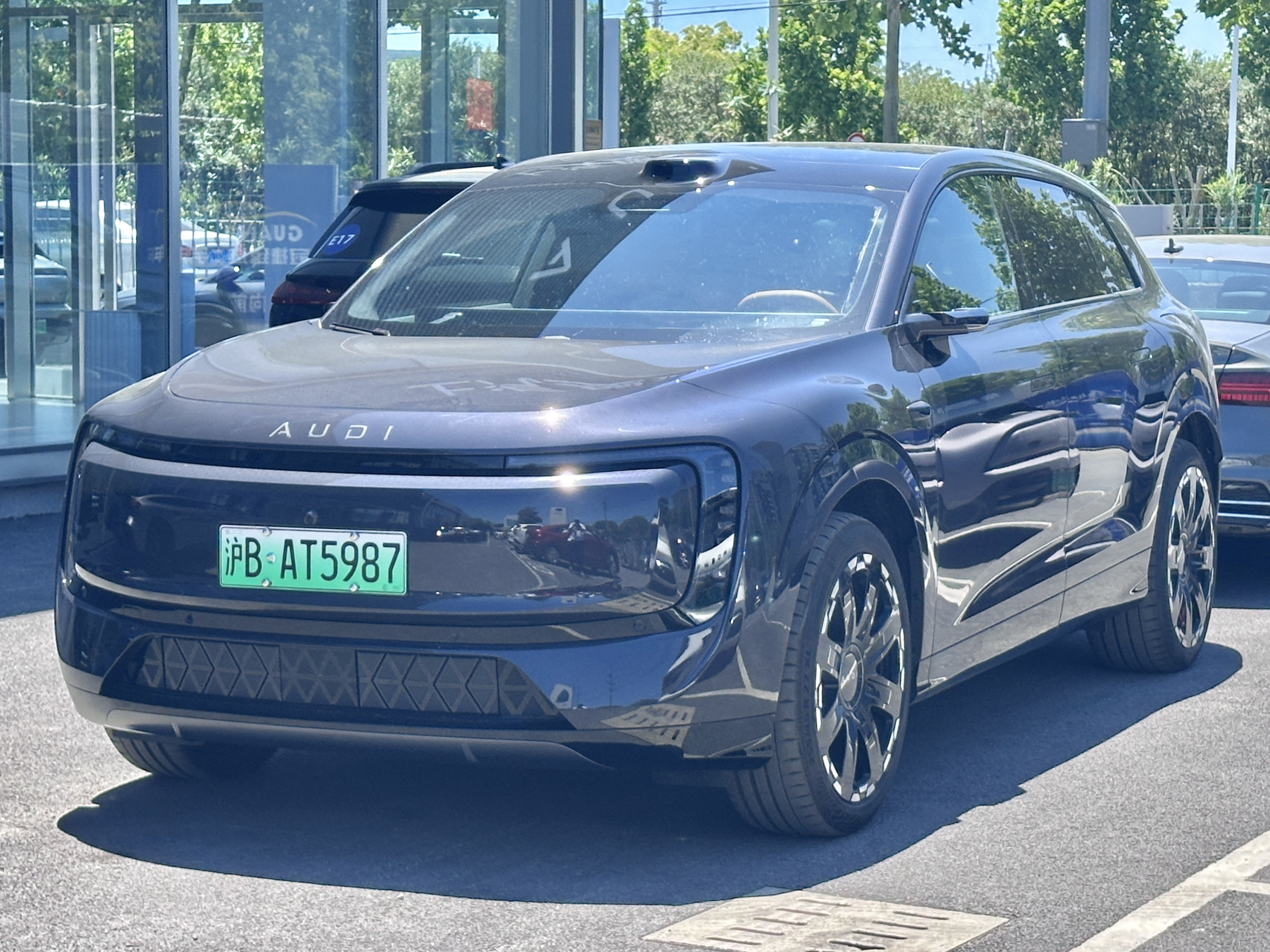
2026–present
奥迪E7X
AUDI E7X

=== Volkswagen ===
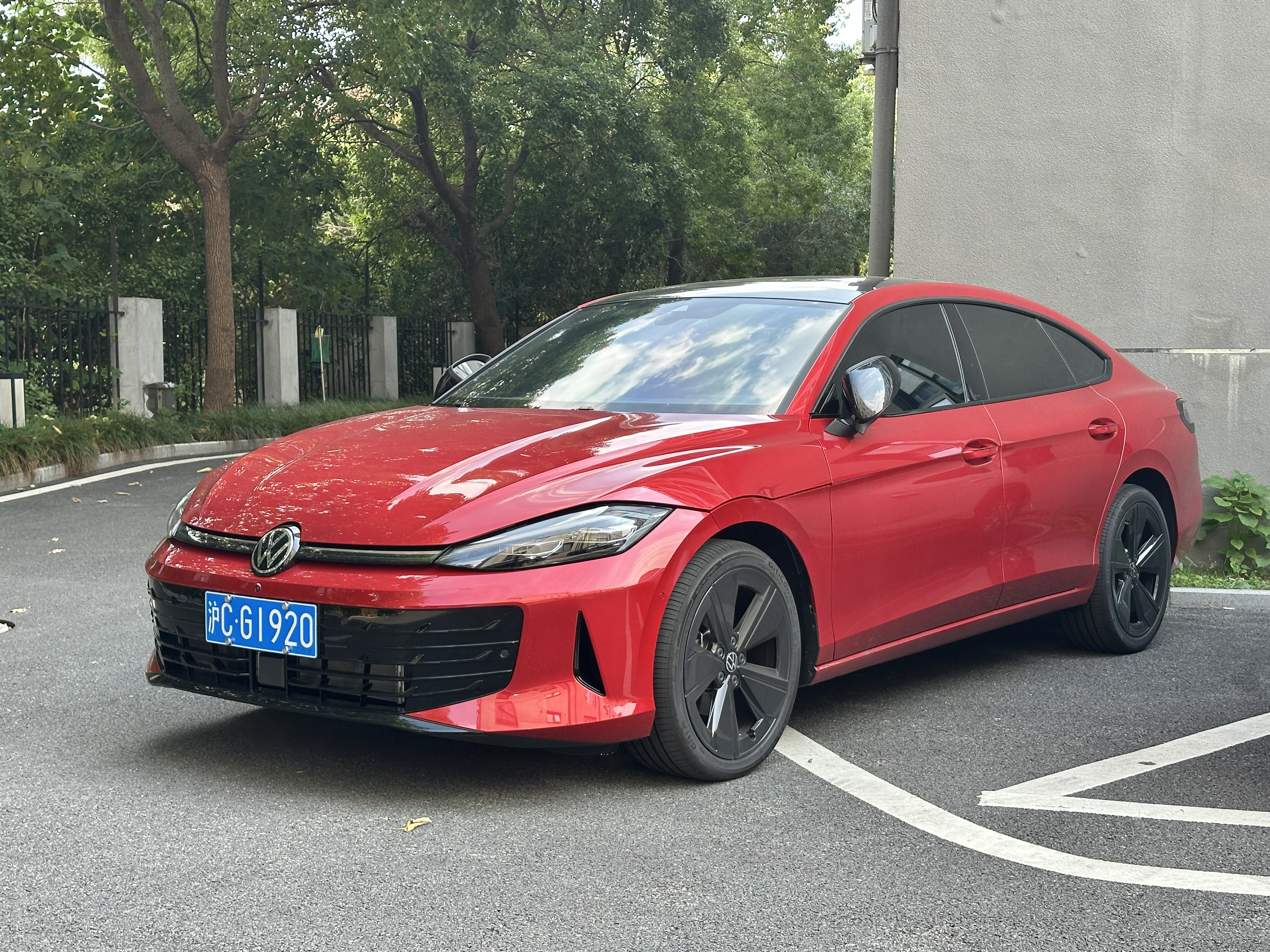
2022–present
大众凌渡
Volkswagen Lamando L

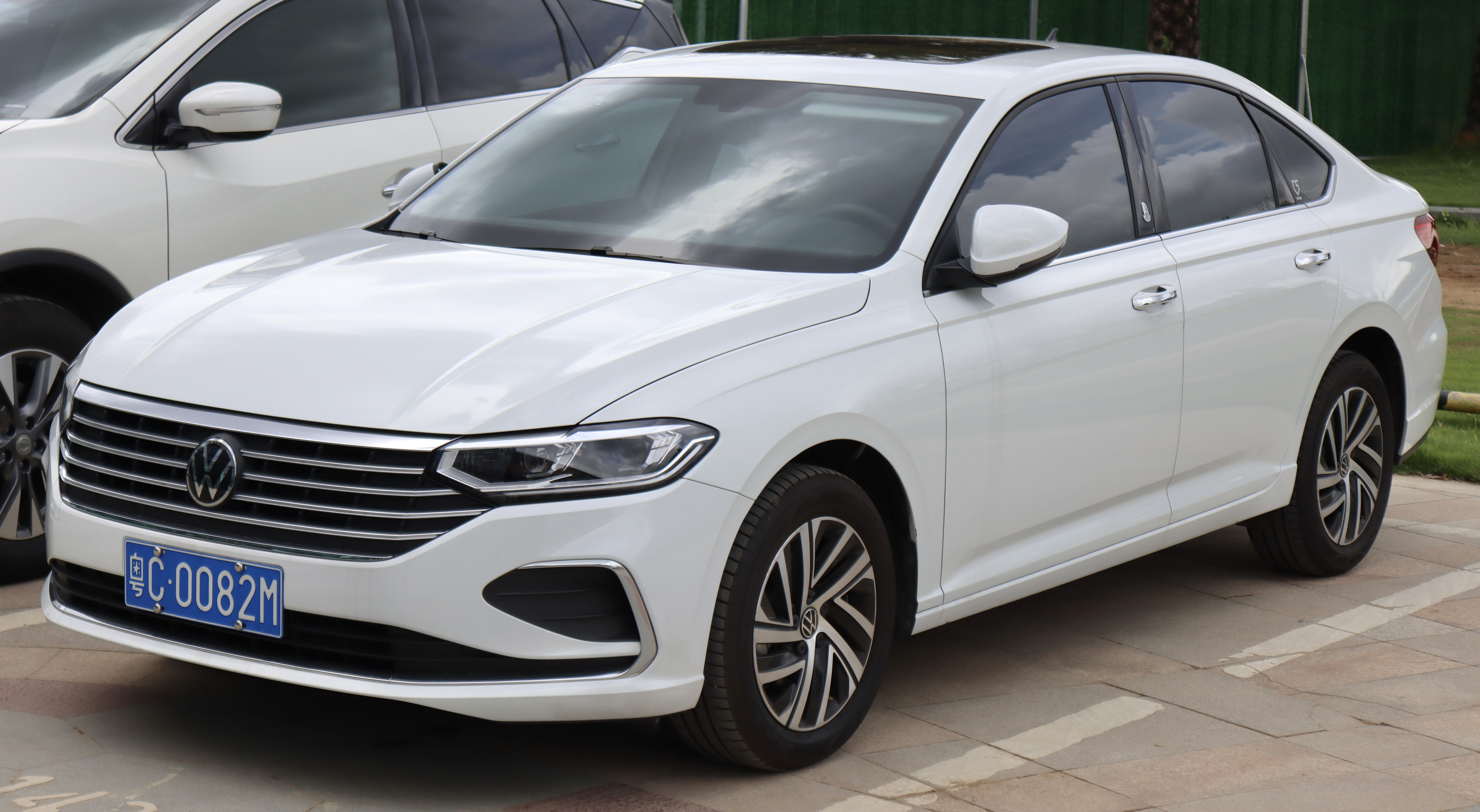
2018–present
大众朗逸
Volkswagen Lavida

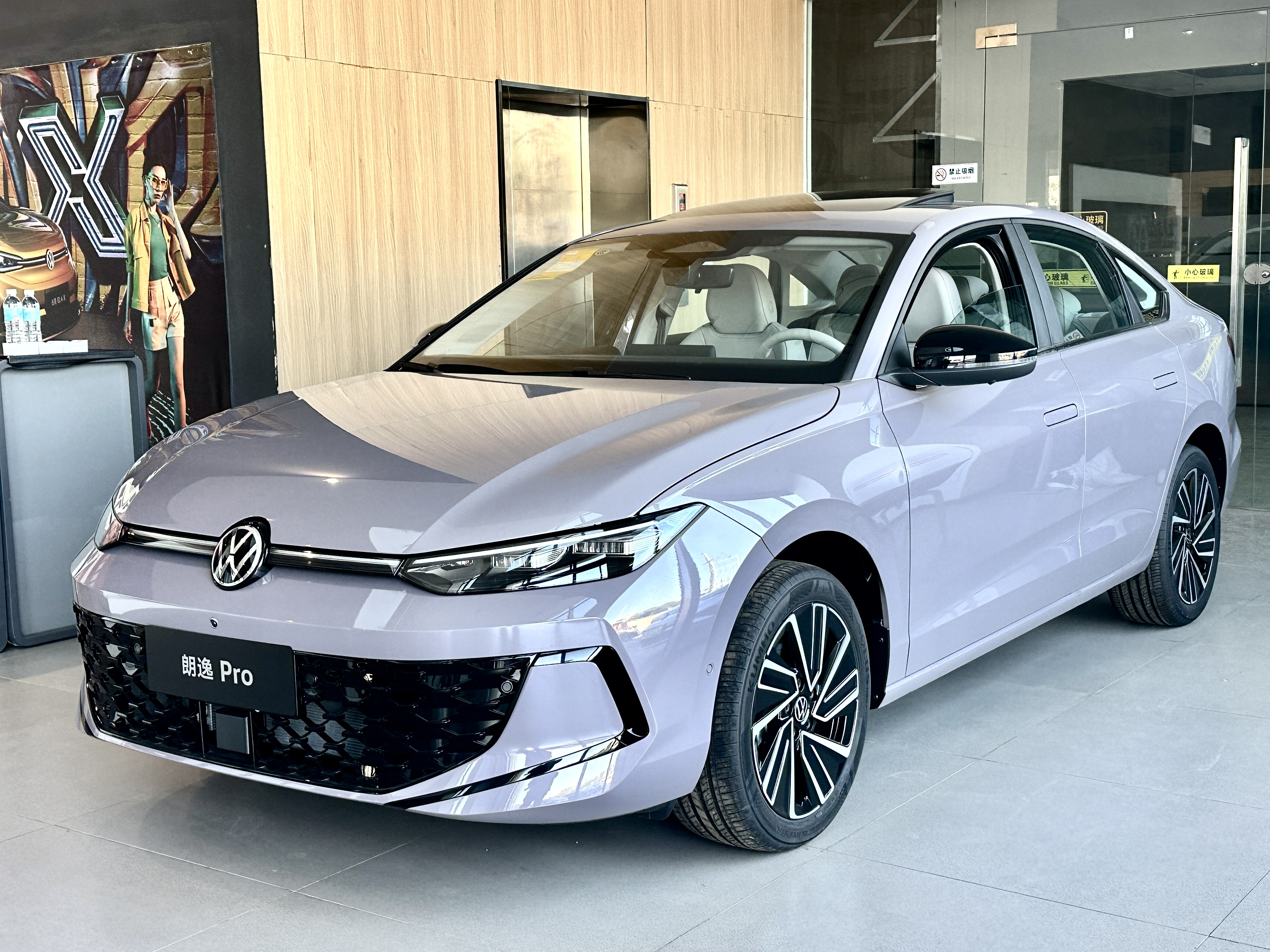
2025–present
大众朗逸Pro
Volkswagen Lavida Pro

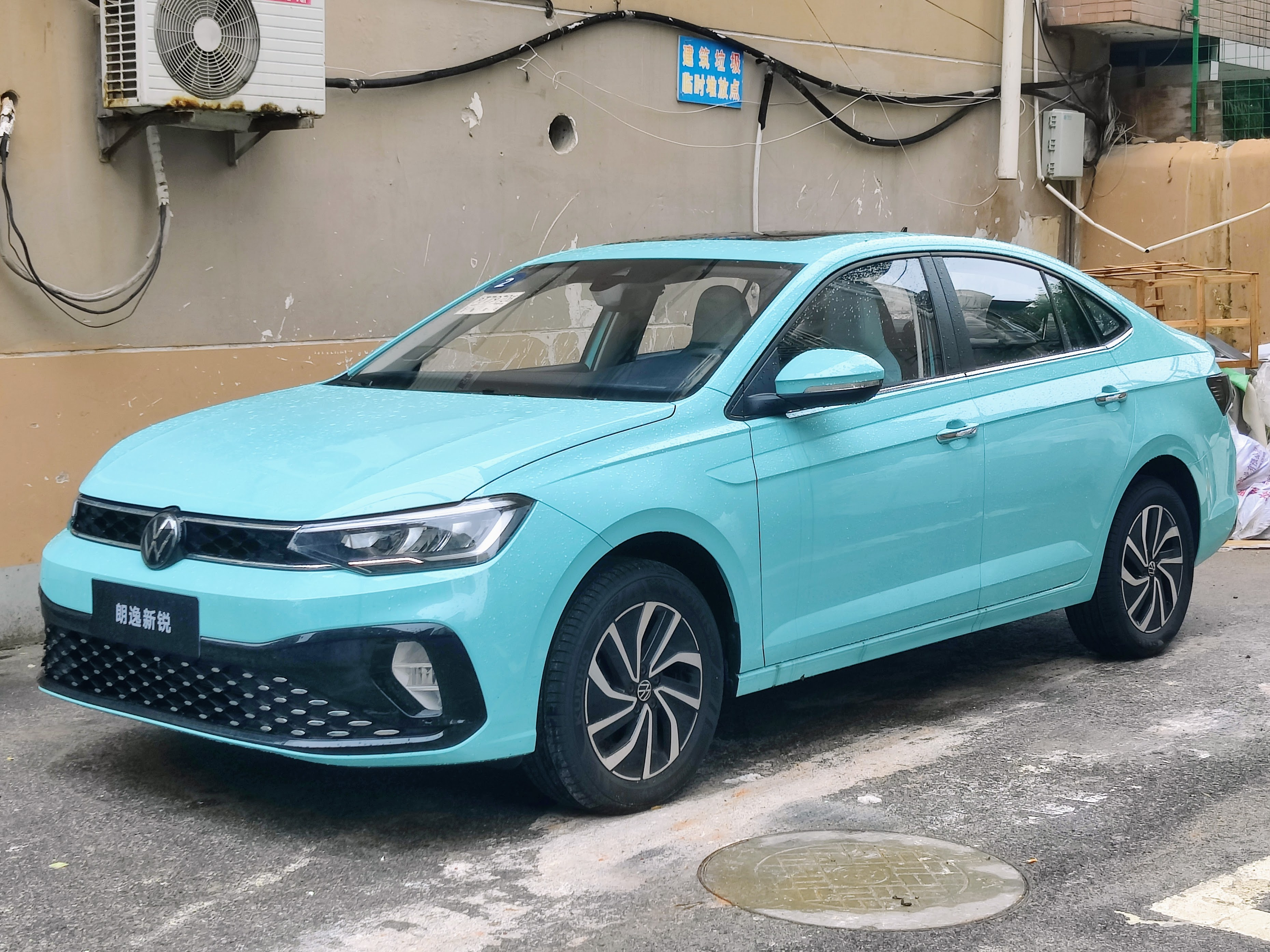
2023–present
大众朗逸新锐
Volkswagen Lavida XR

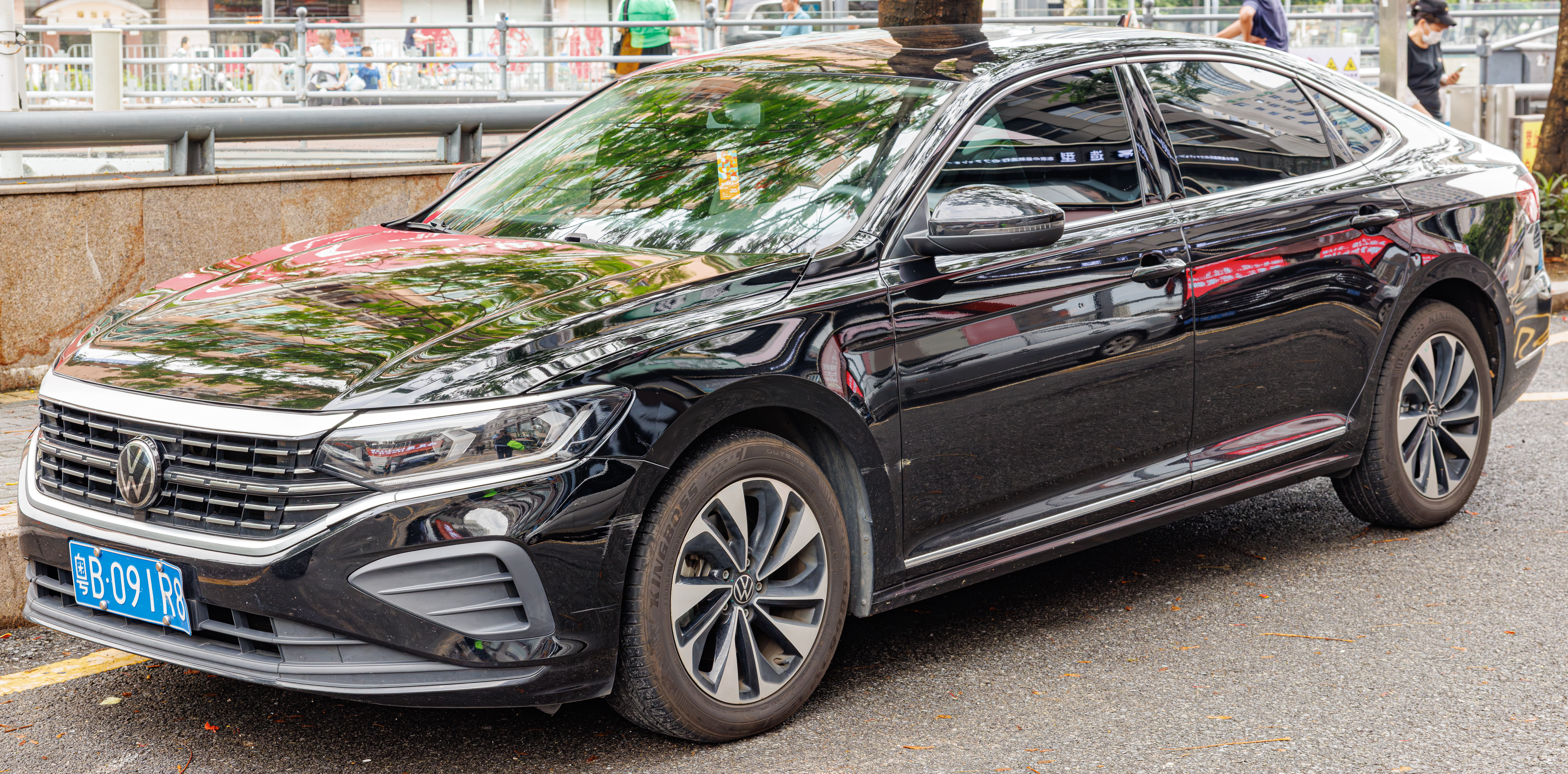
2019–present
大众帕萨特
Volkswagen Passat

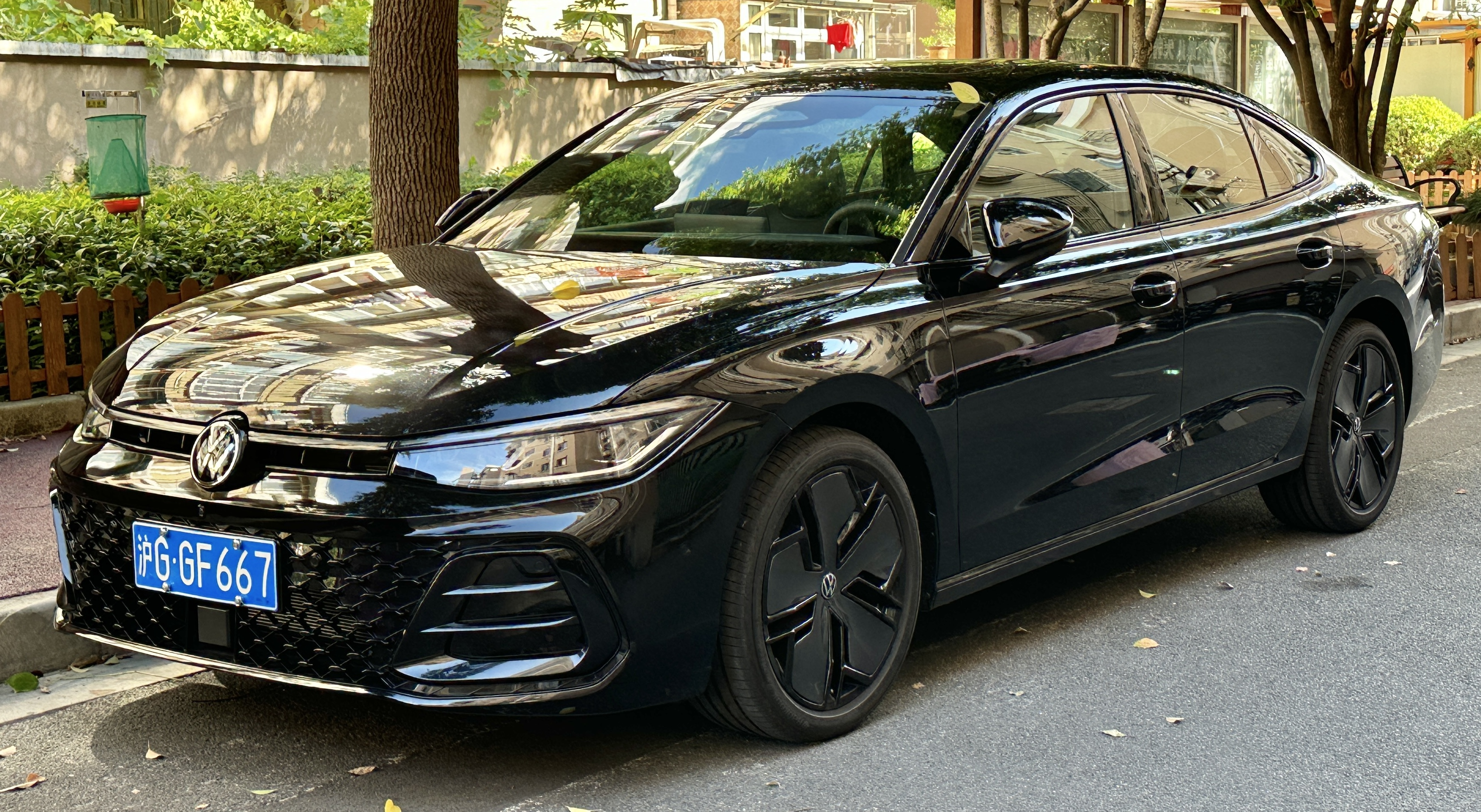
2024–present
大众帕萨特Pro
Volkswagen Passat Pro

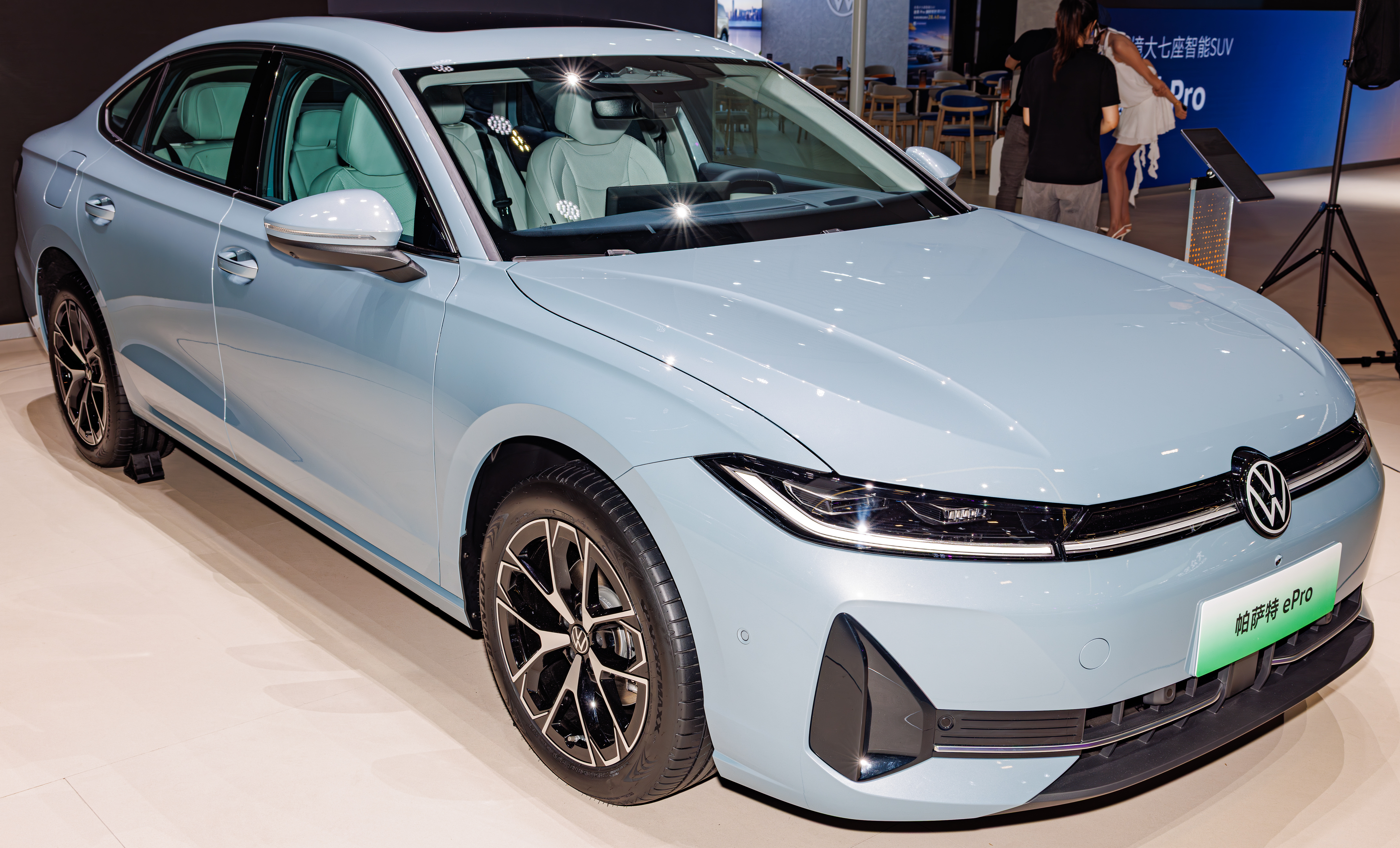
2026–present
大众帕萨特ePro
Volkswagen Passat ePro

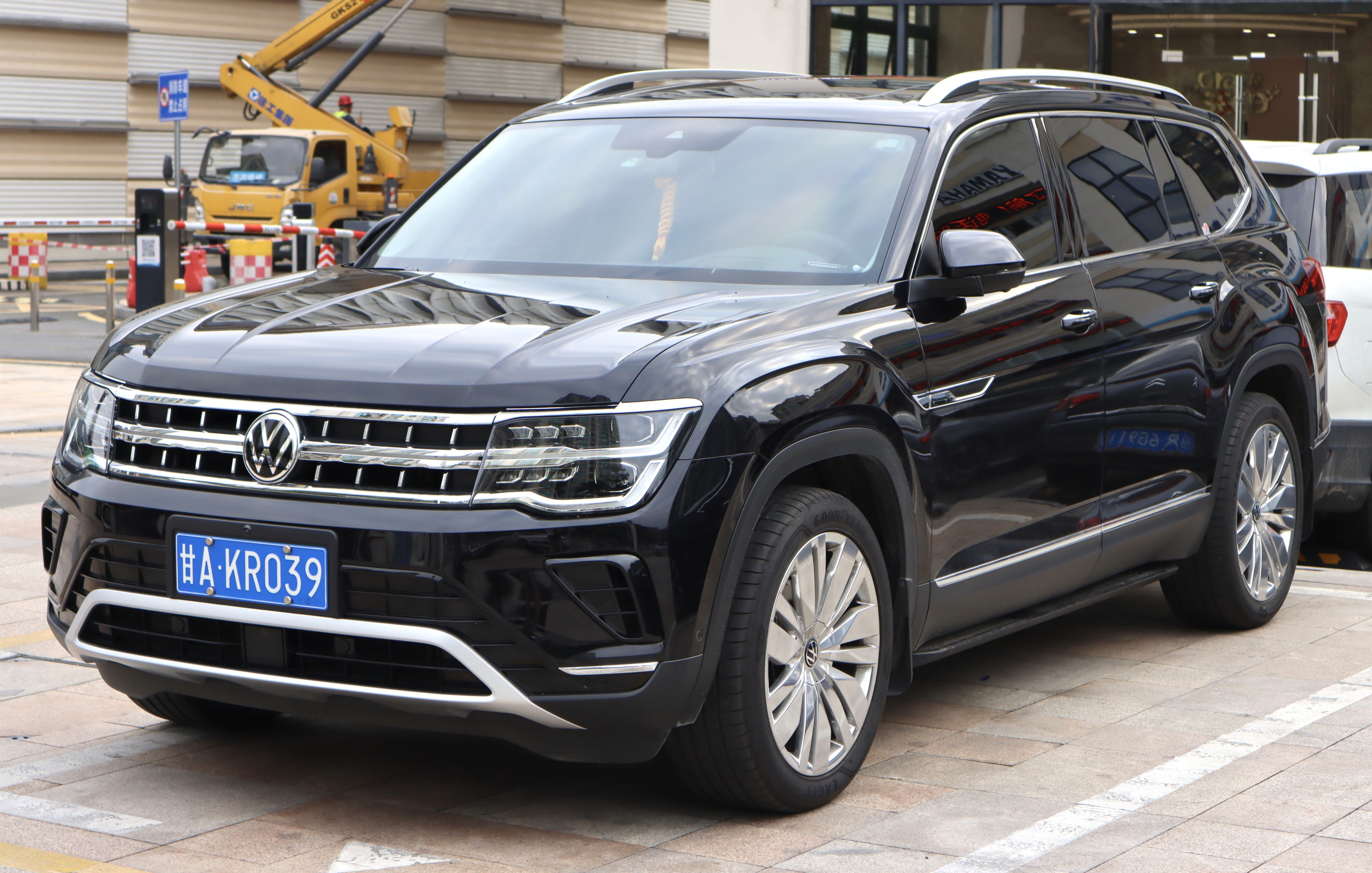
2017–present
大众途昂
Volkswagen Teramont

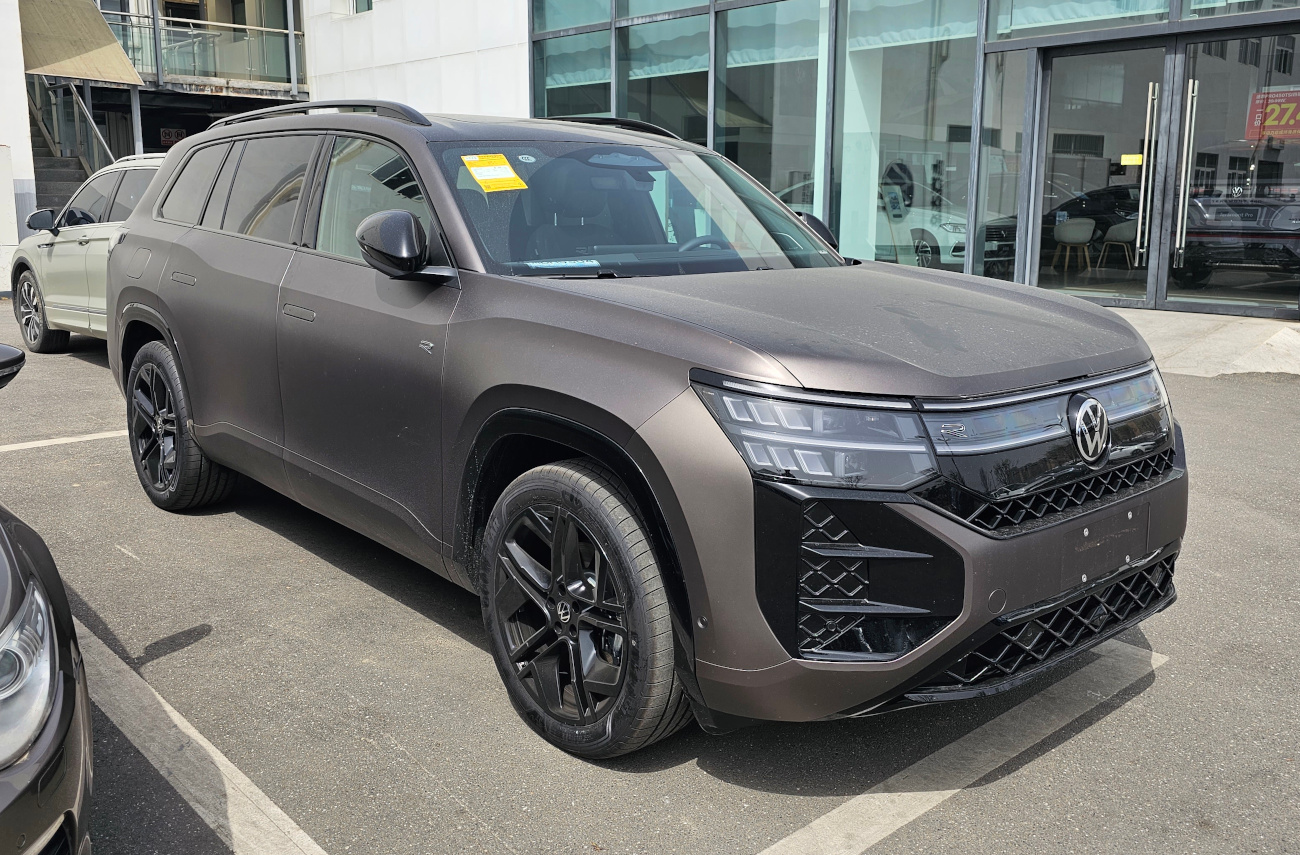
2025–present
大众途昂Pro
Volkswagen Teramont Pro

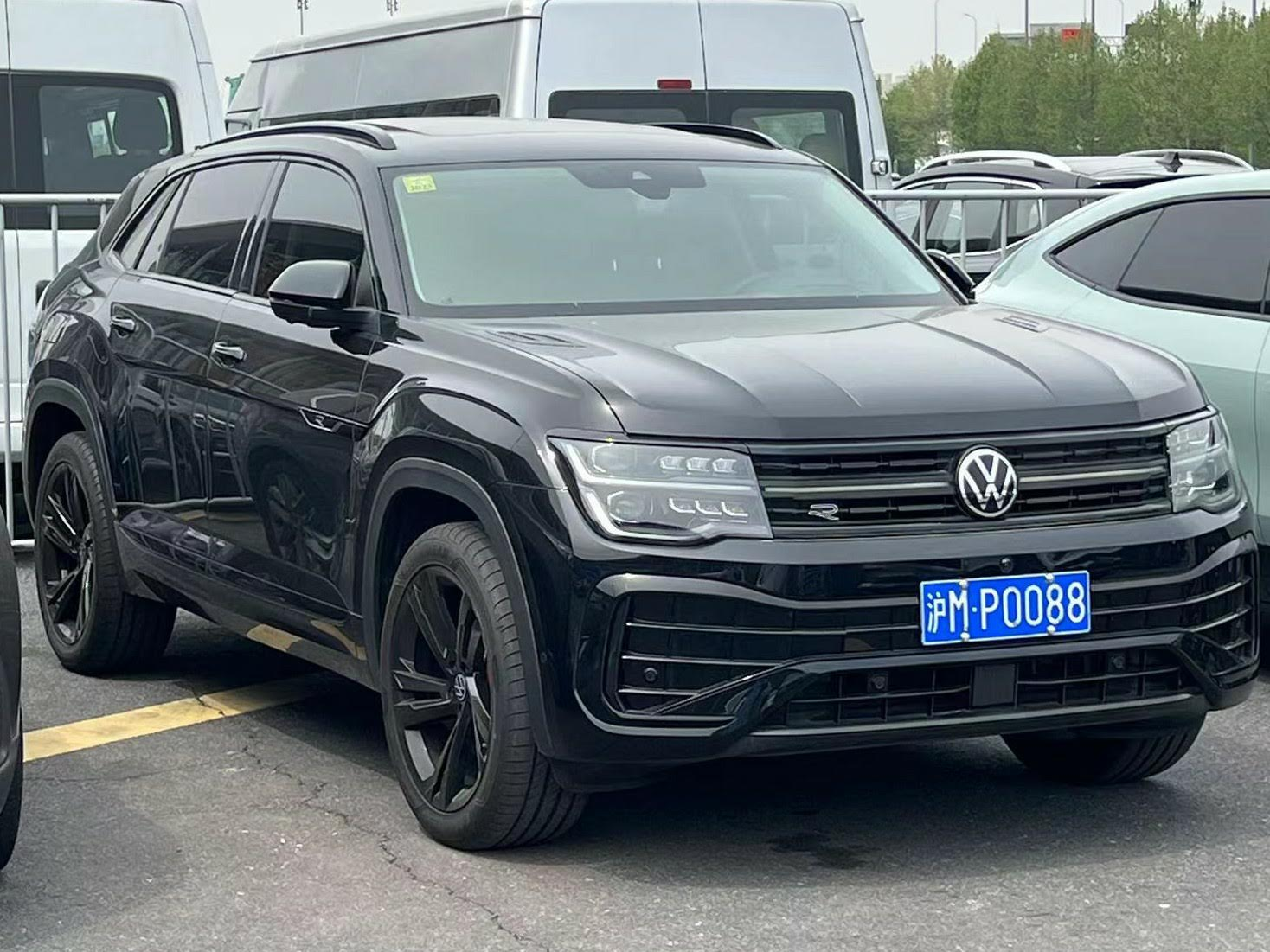
2019–present
大众途昂X
Volkswagen Teramont X

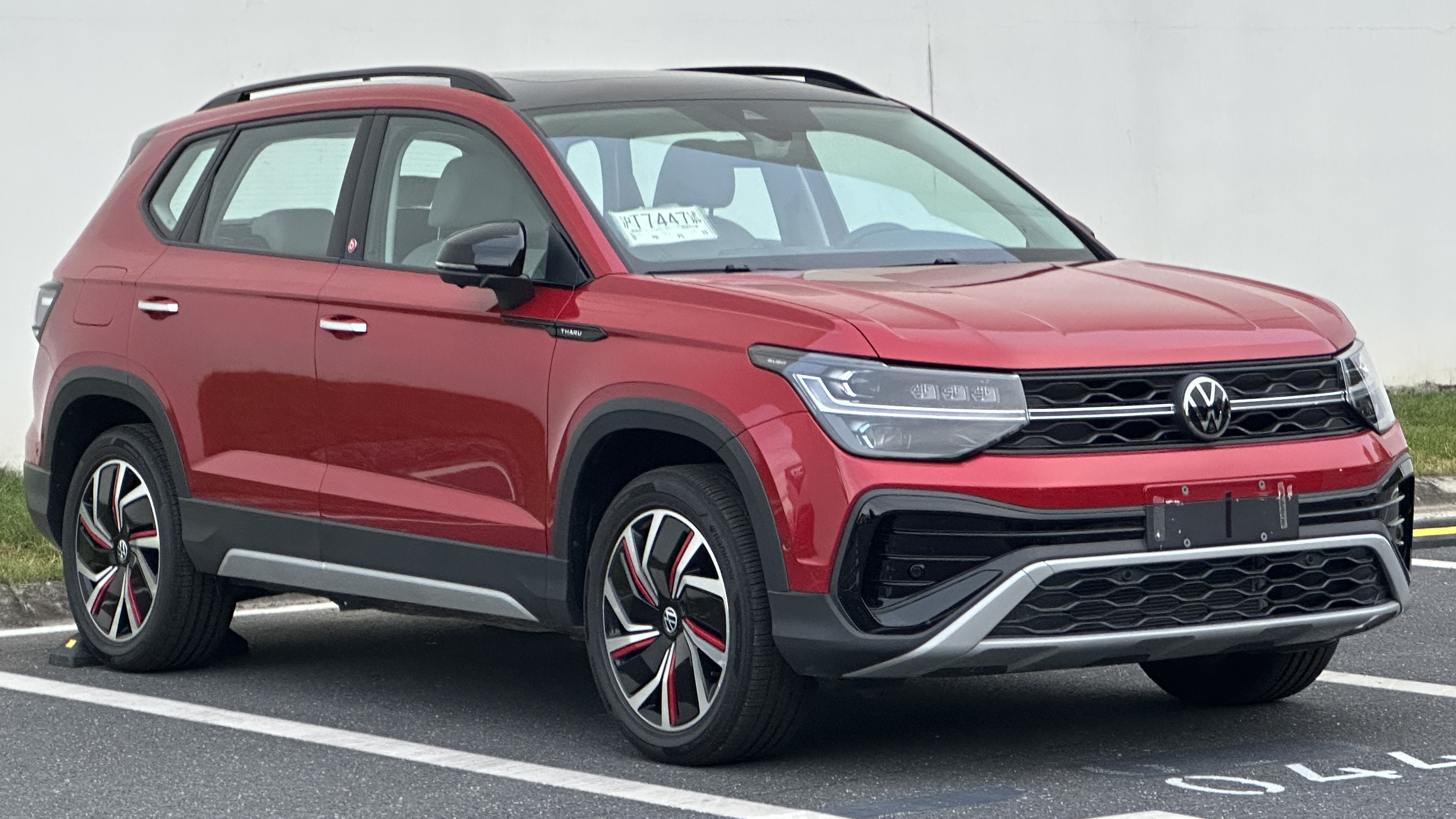
2018–present
大众途岳
Volkswagen Tharu

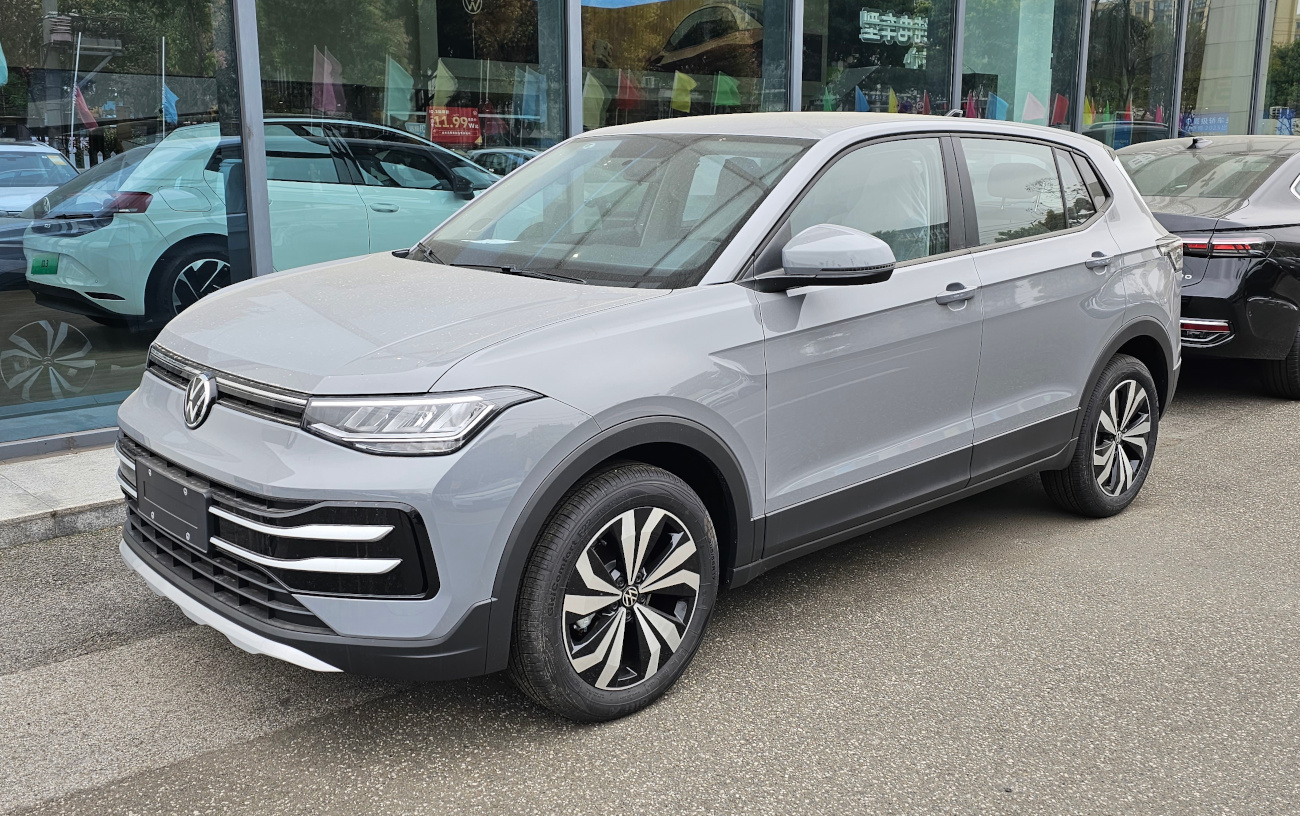
2024–present
大众途岳新锐
Volkswagen Tharu XR

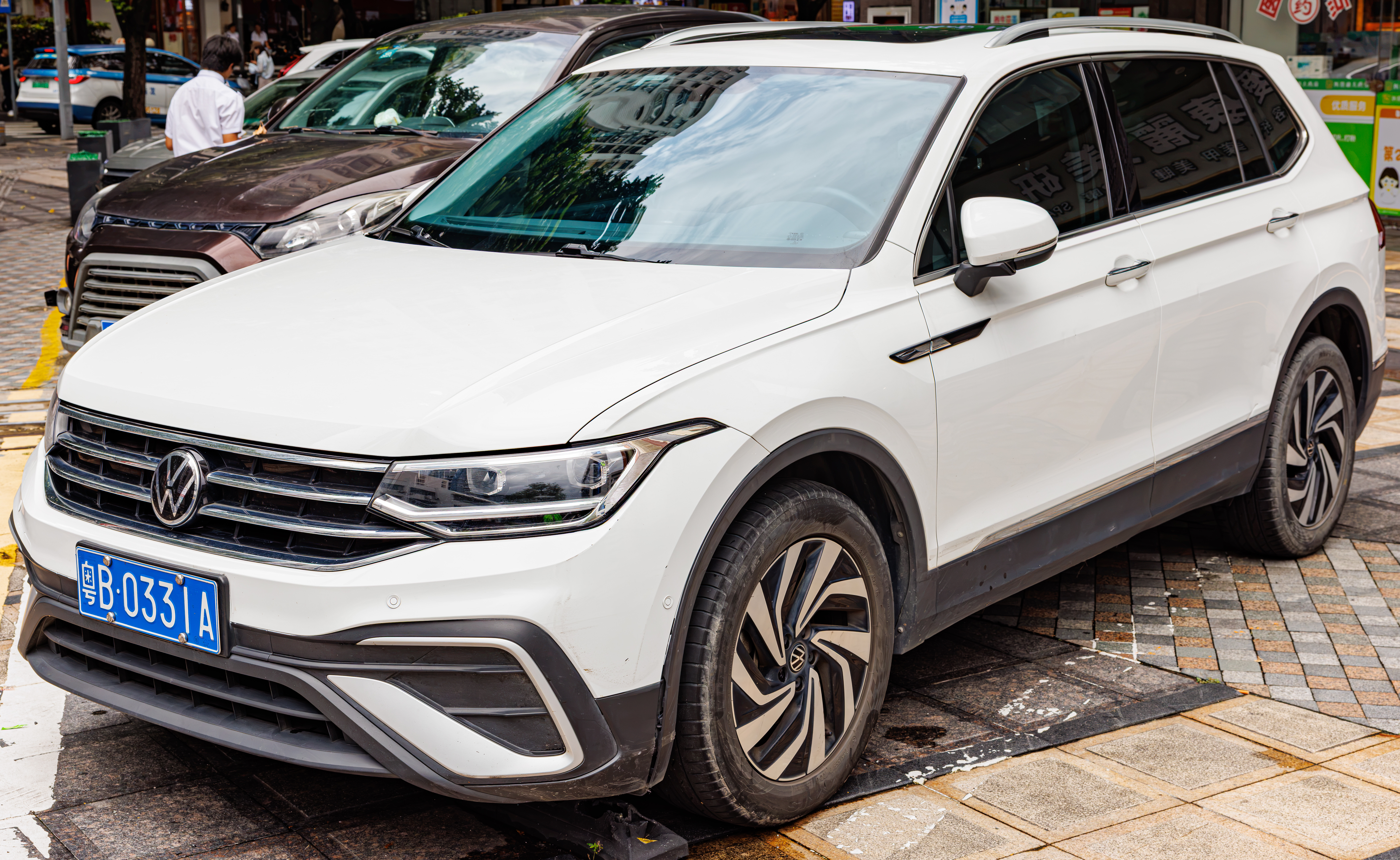
2017–present
大众途观L
Volkswagen Tiguan L

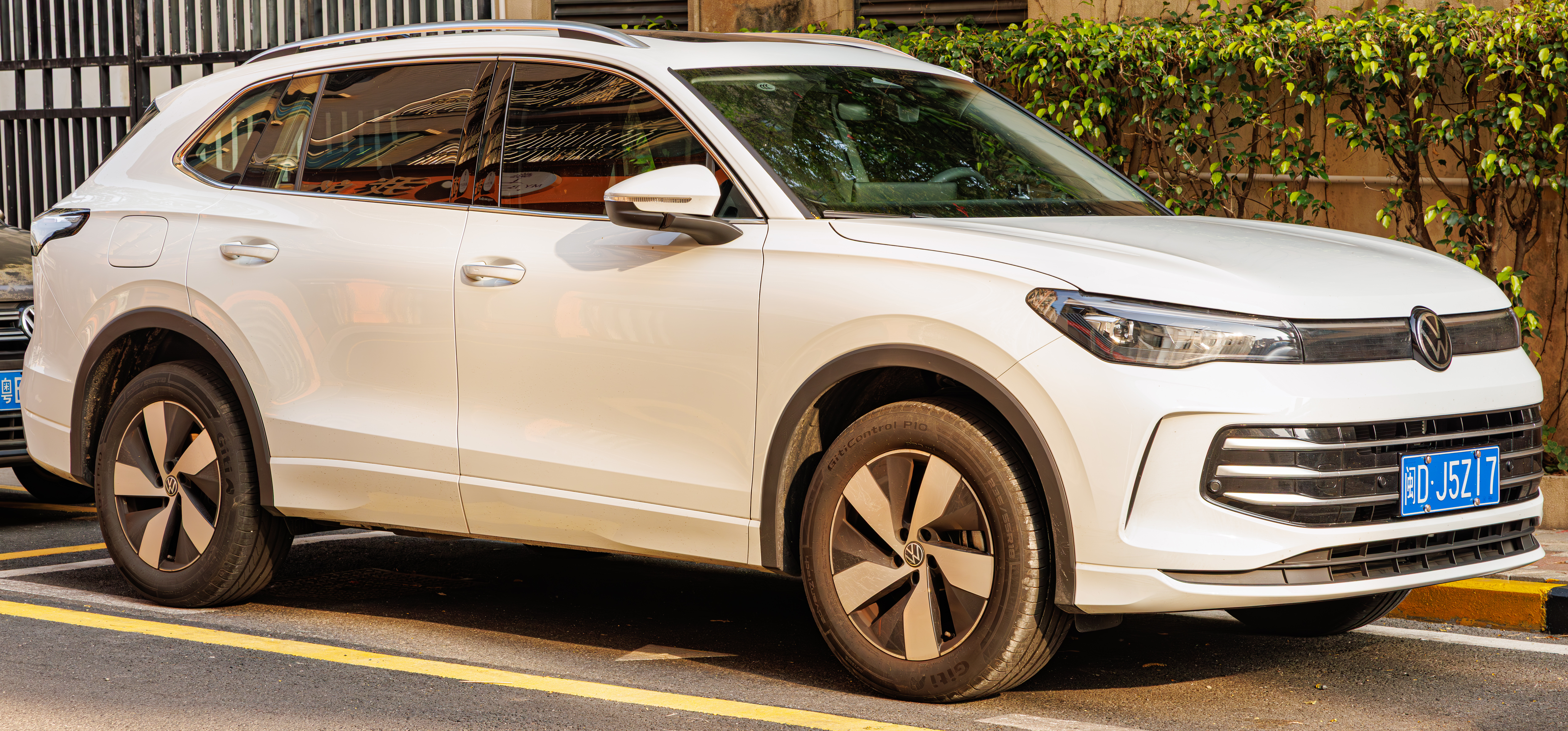
2024–present
大众途观L Pro
Volkswagen Tiguan L Pro

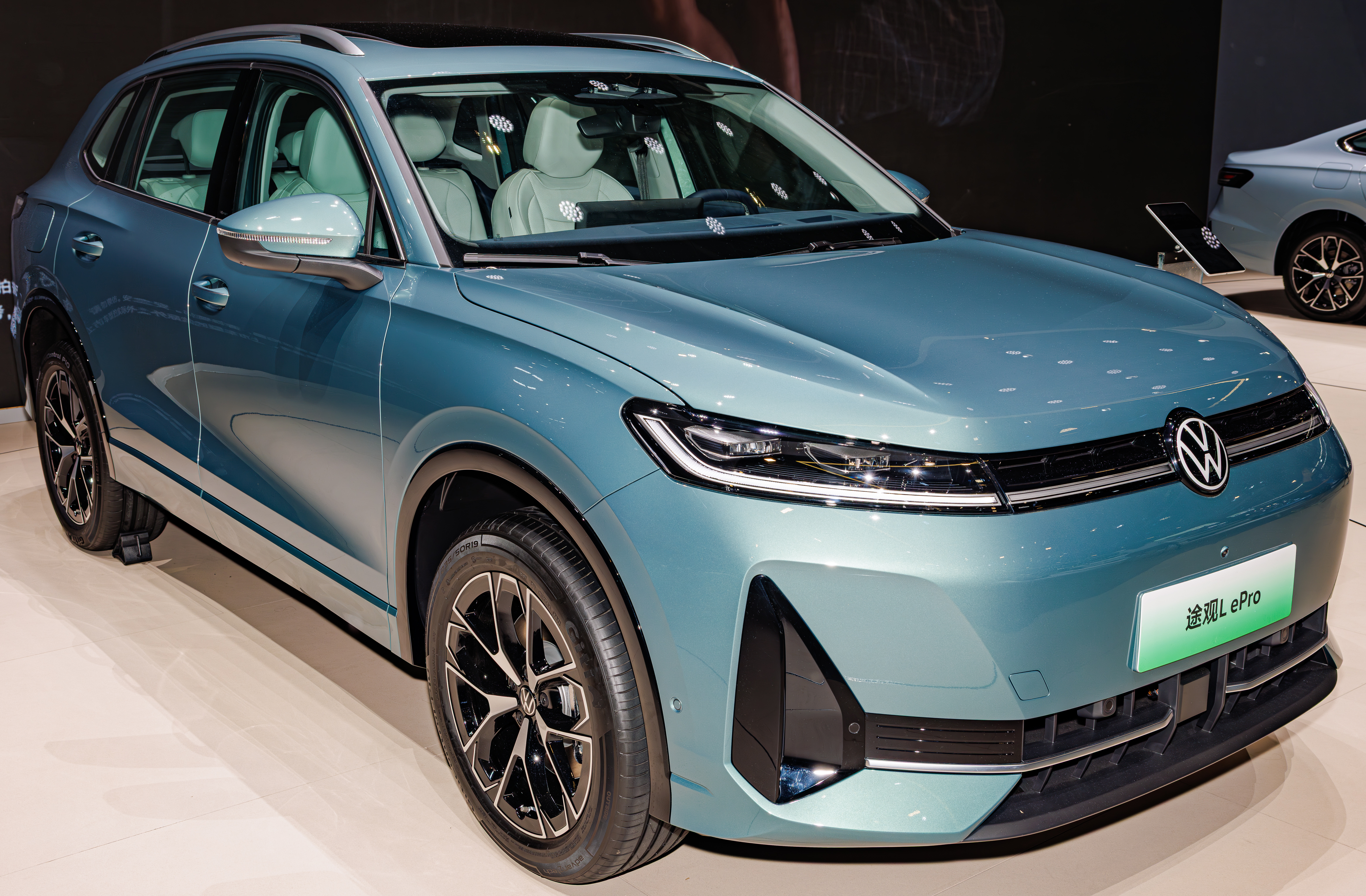
2026–present
大众途观L ePro
Volkswagen Tiguan L ePro

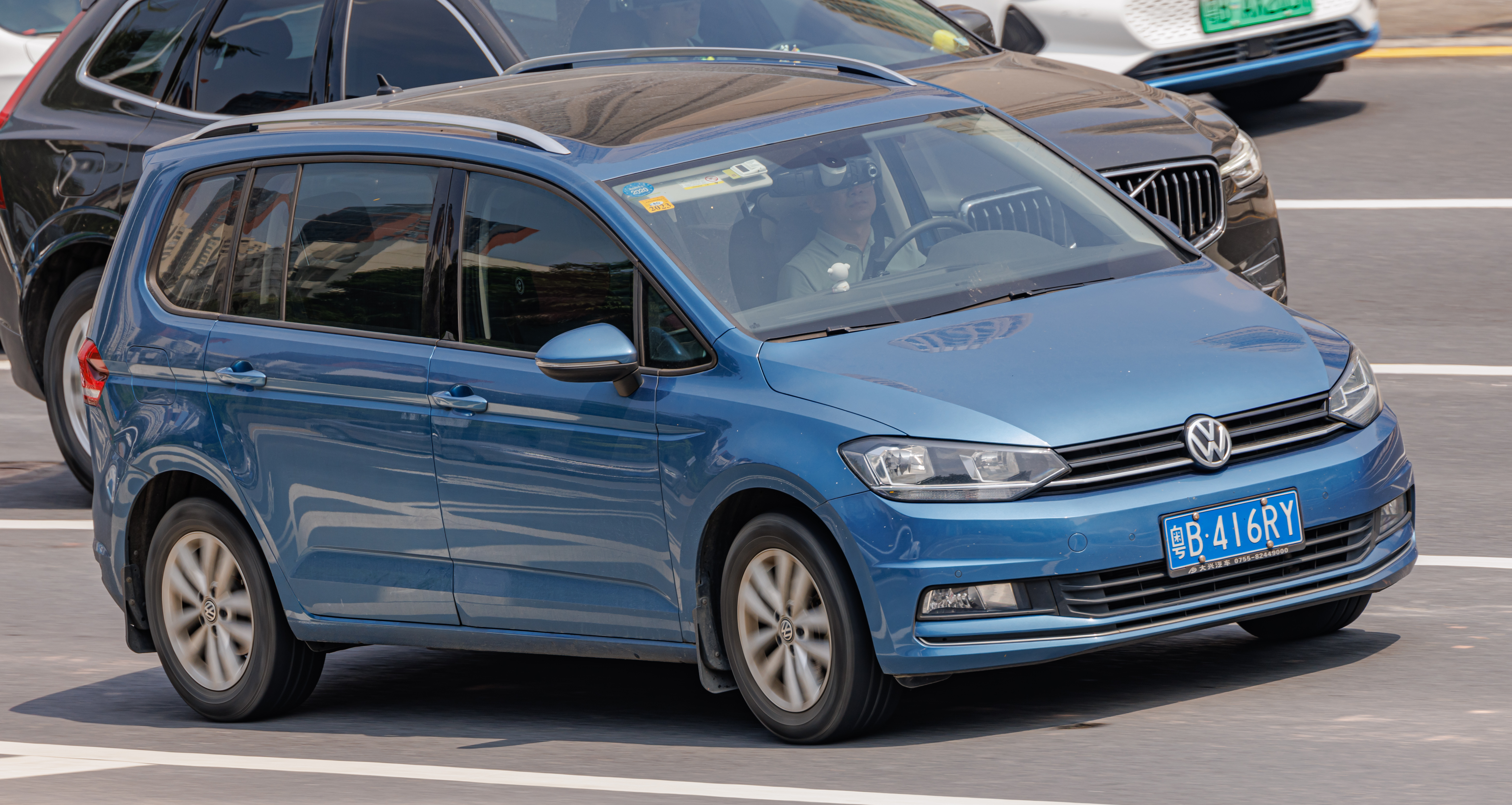
2016–present
大众途安L
Volkswagen Touran L

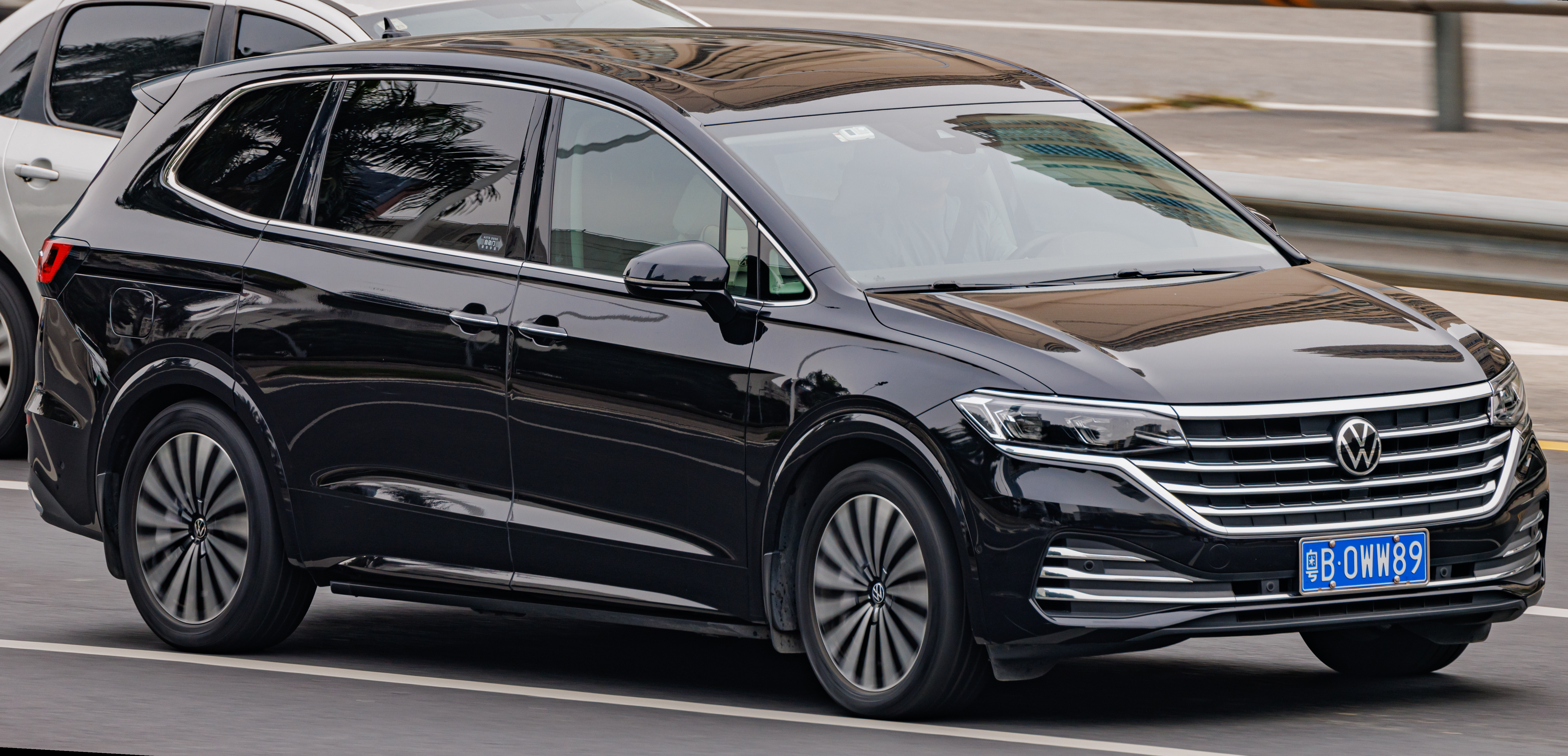
2020–present
大众威然
Volkswagen Viloran

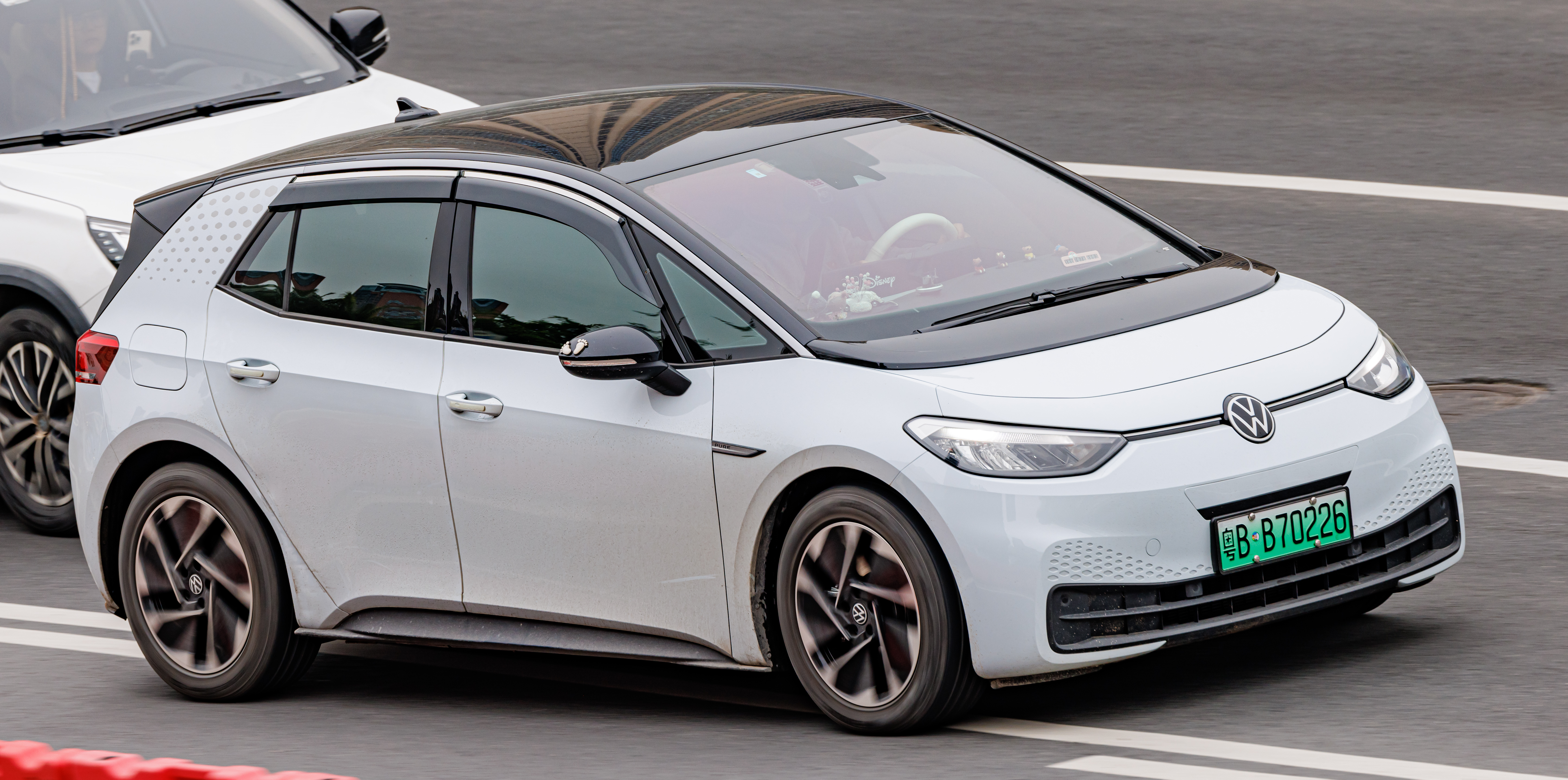
2021–present
大众ID.3
Volkswagen ID.3

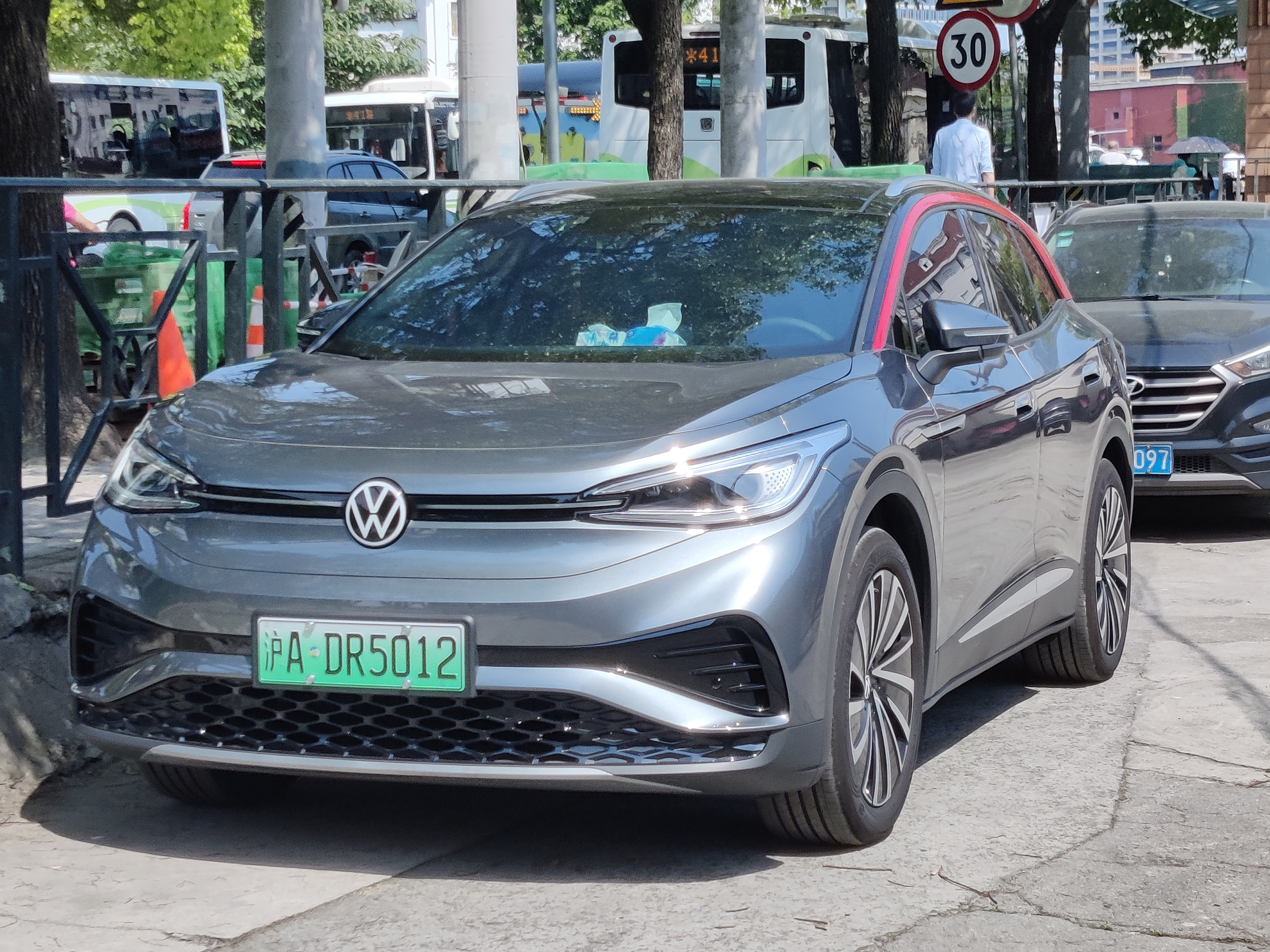
2021–present
大众ID.4 X
Volkswagen ID.4 X

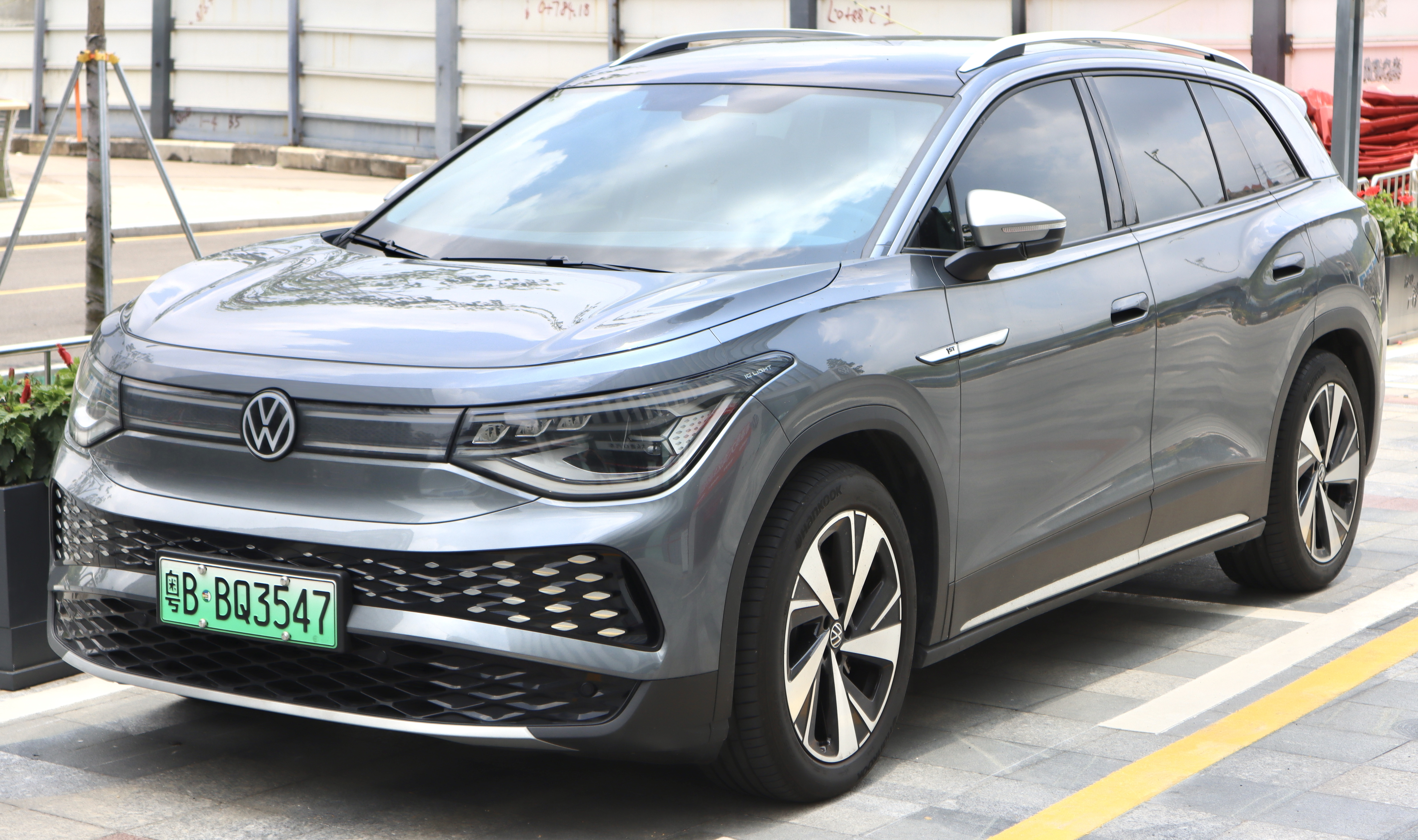
2021–present
大众ID.6 X
Volkswagen ID.6 X

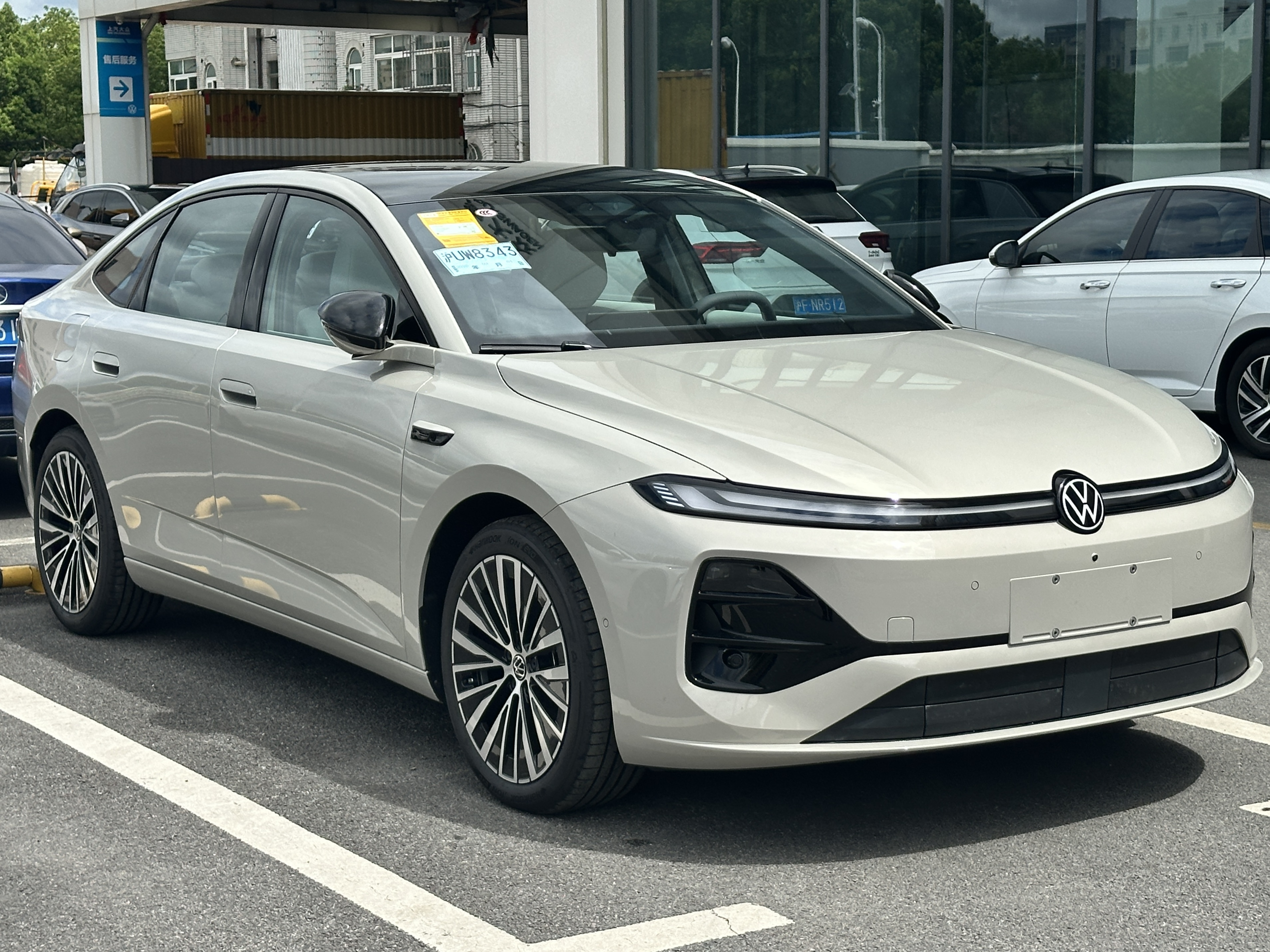
2026–present
大众ID. ERA 5S
Volkswagen ID. Era 5S

2026–present
大众ID. ERA 5X
Volkswagen ID. Era 5X

2026–present
大众ID. ERA 8X
Volkswagen ID. Era 8X

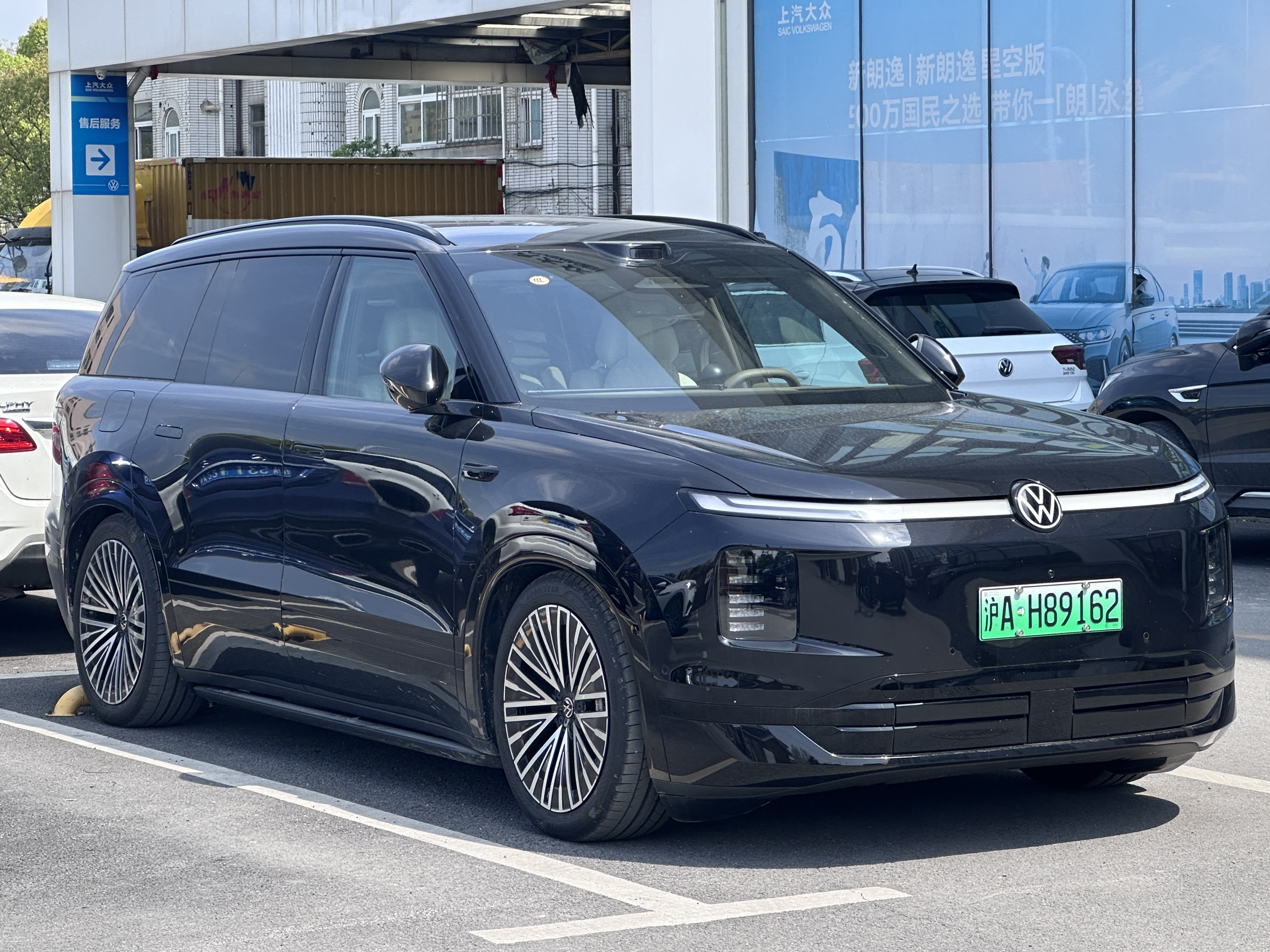
2026–present
大众ID. ERA 9X
Volkswagen ID. Era 9X

== Former products ==
=== Škoda ===
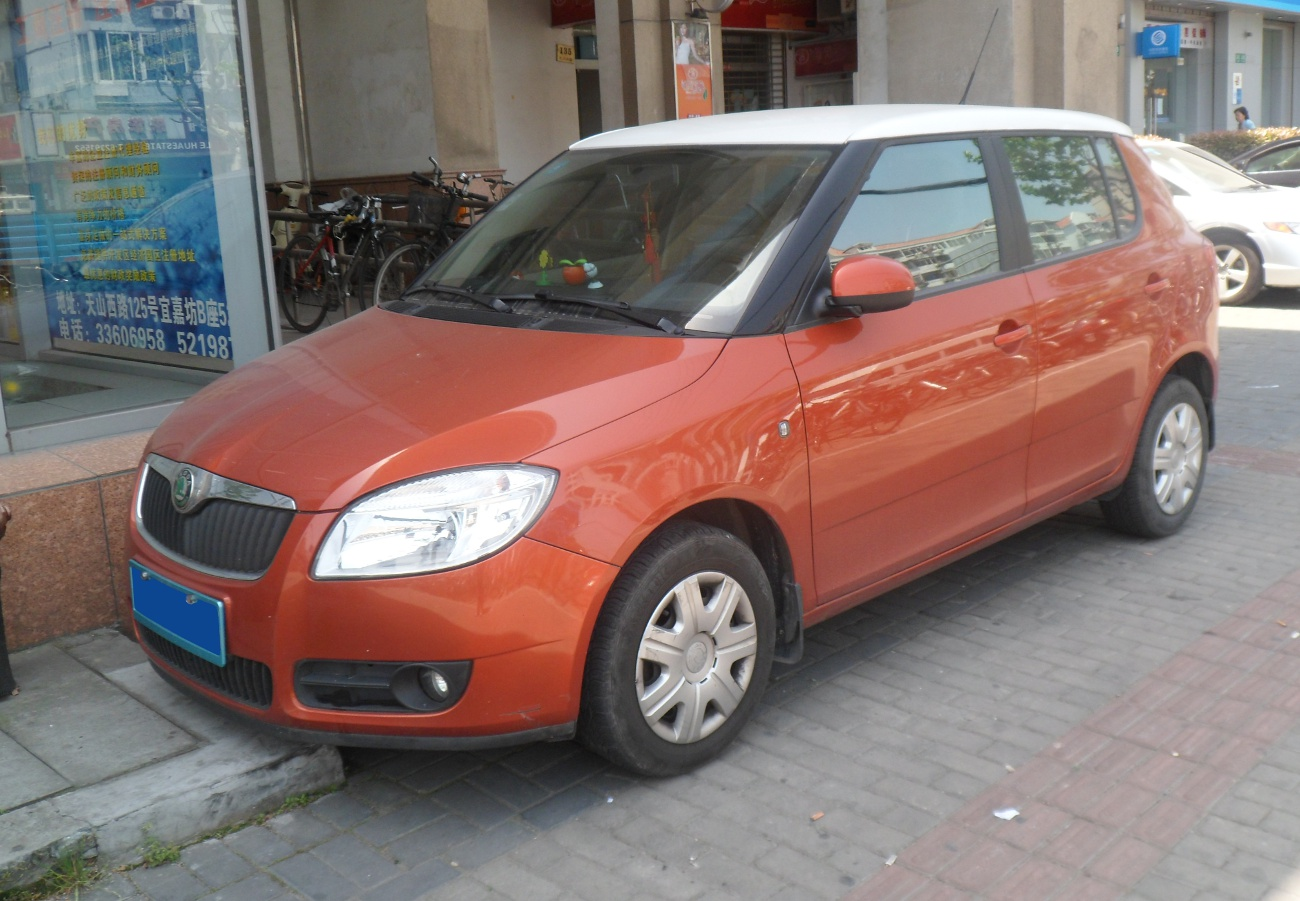
2009–2014
斯柯达晶锐
Škoda Fabia II

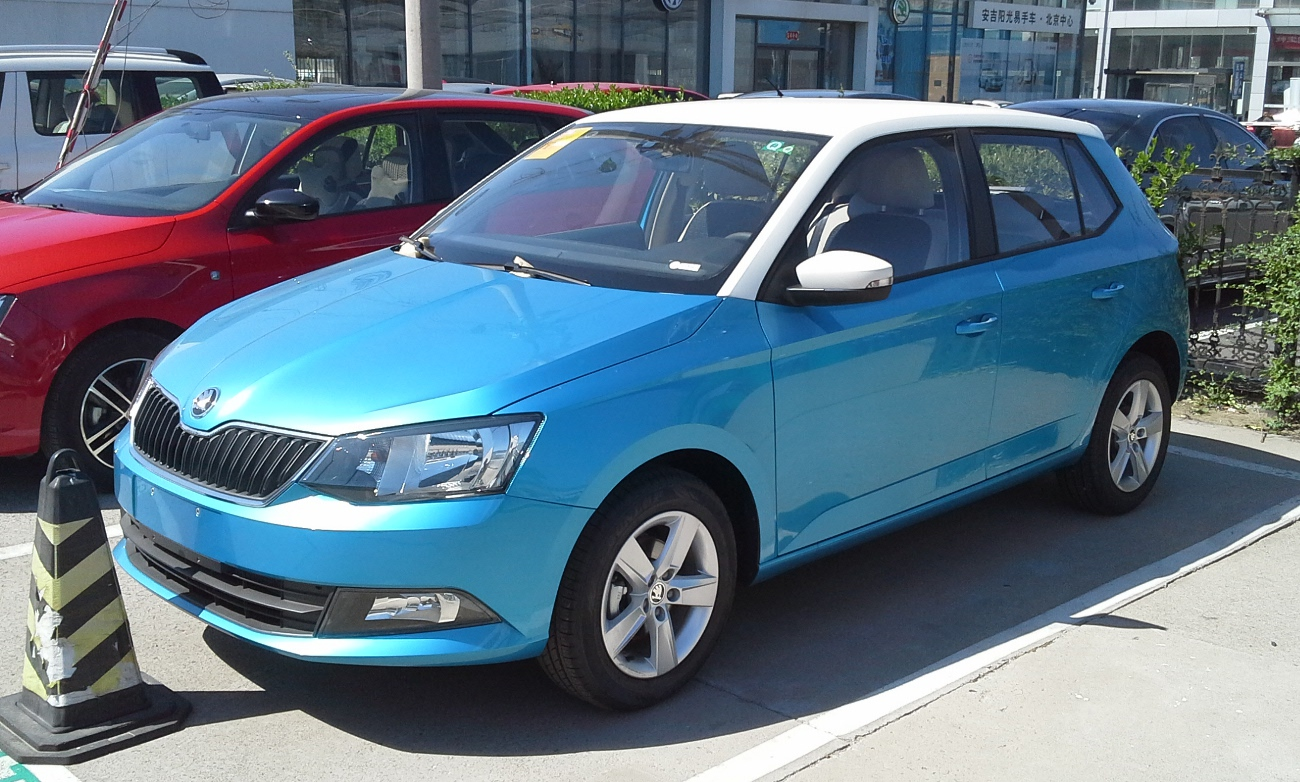
2015–2022
斯柯达晶锐
Škoda Fabia III

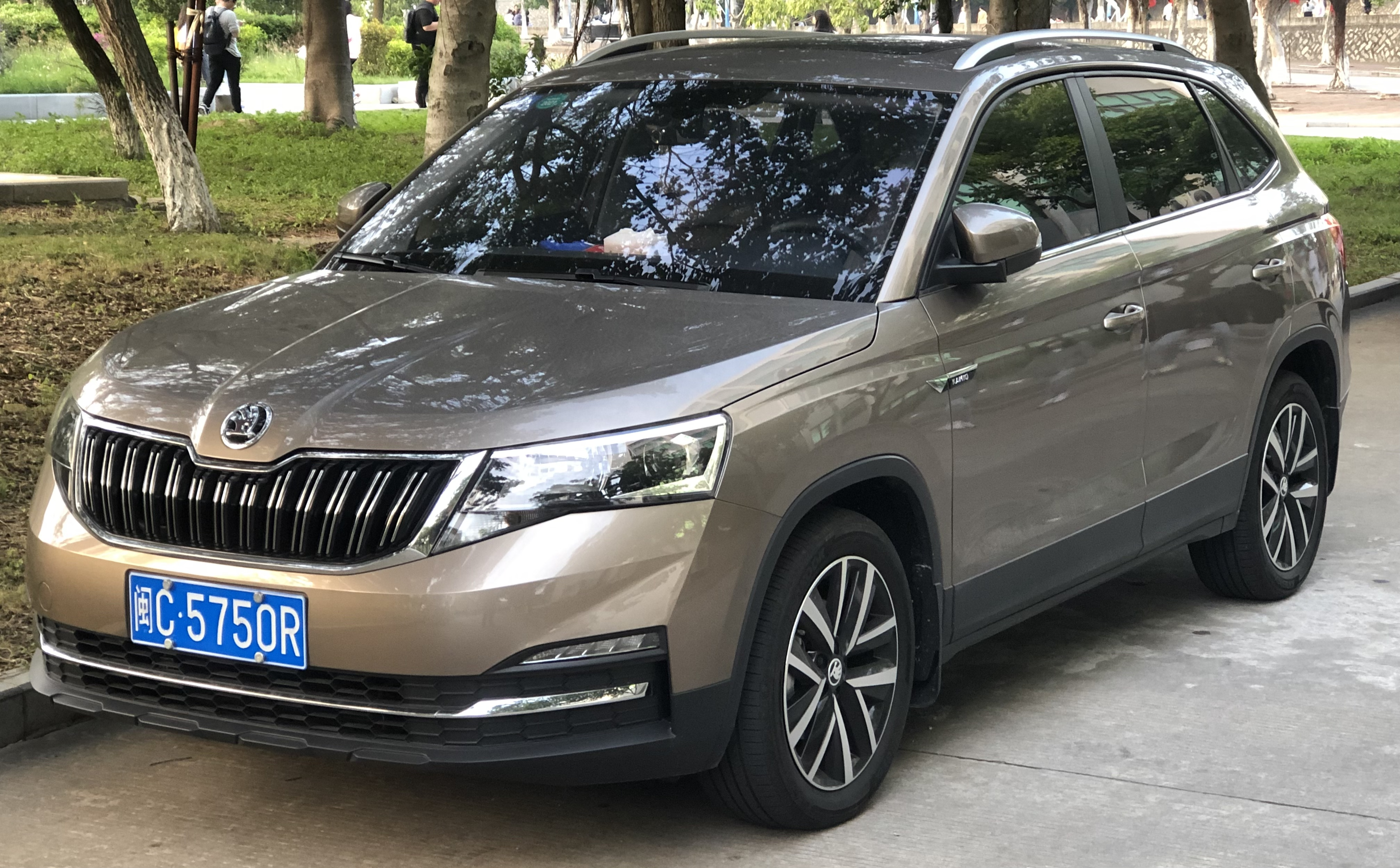
2018–2026
斯柯达柯米克
Škoda Kamiq

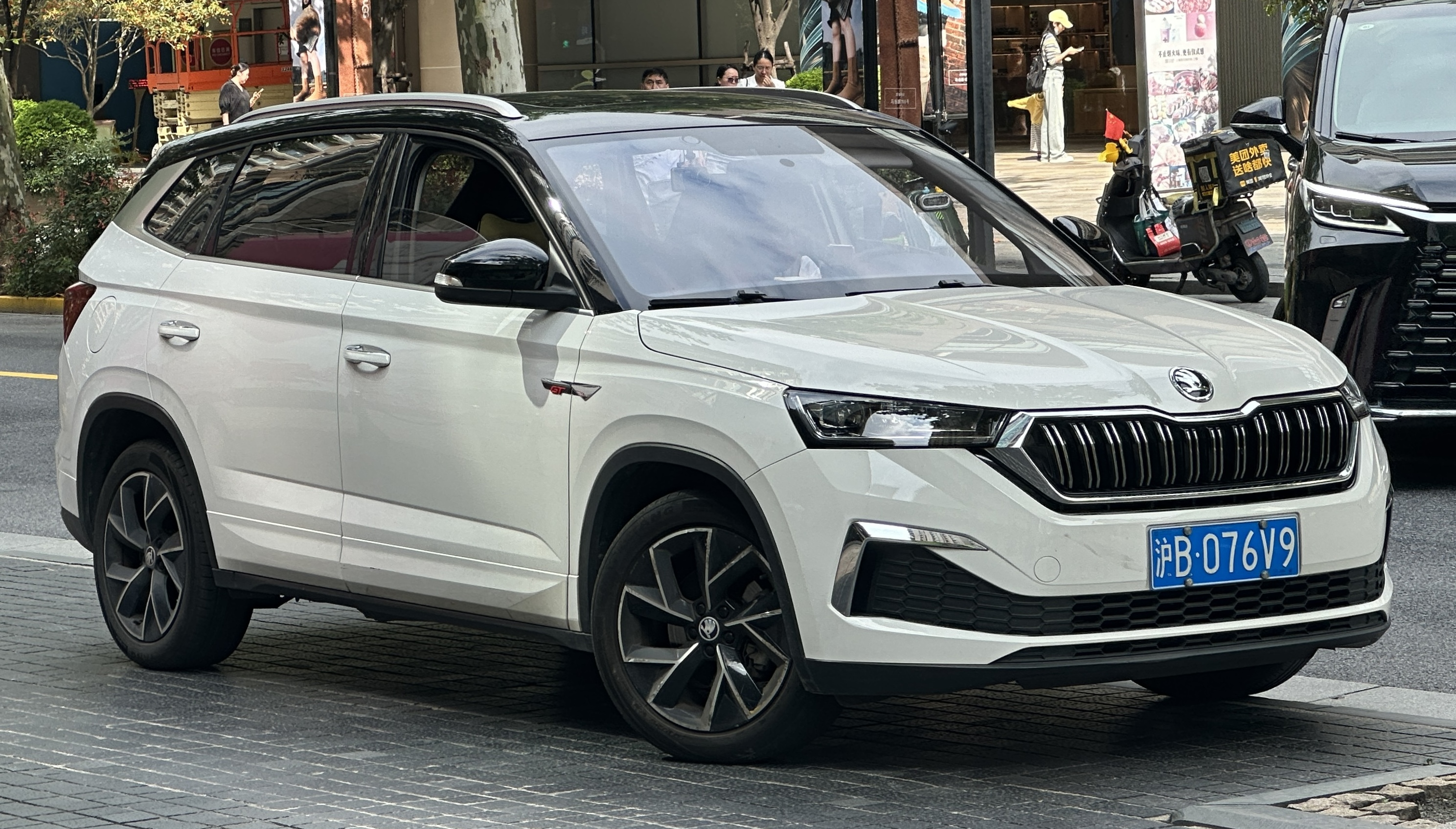
2019–2026
斯柯达柯米克GT
Škoda Kamiq GT

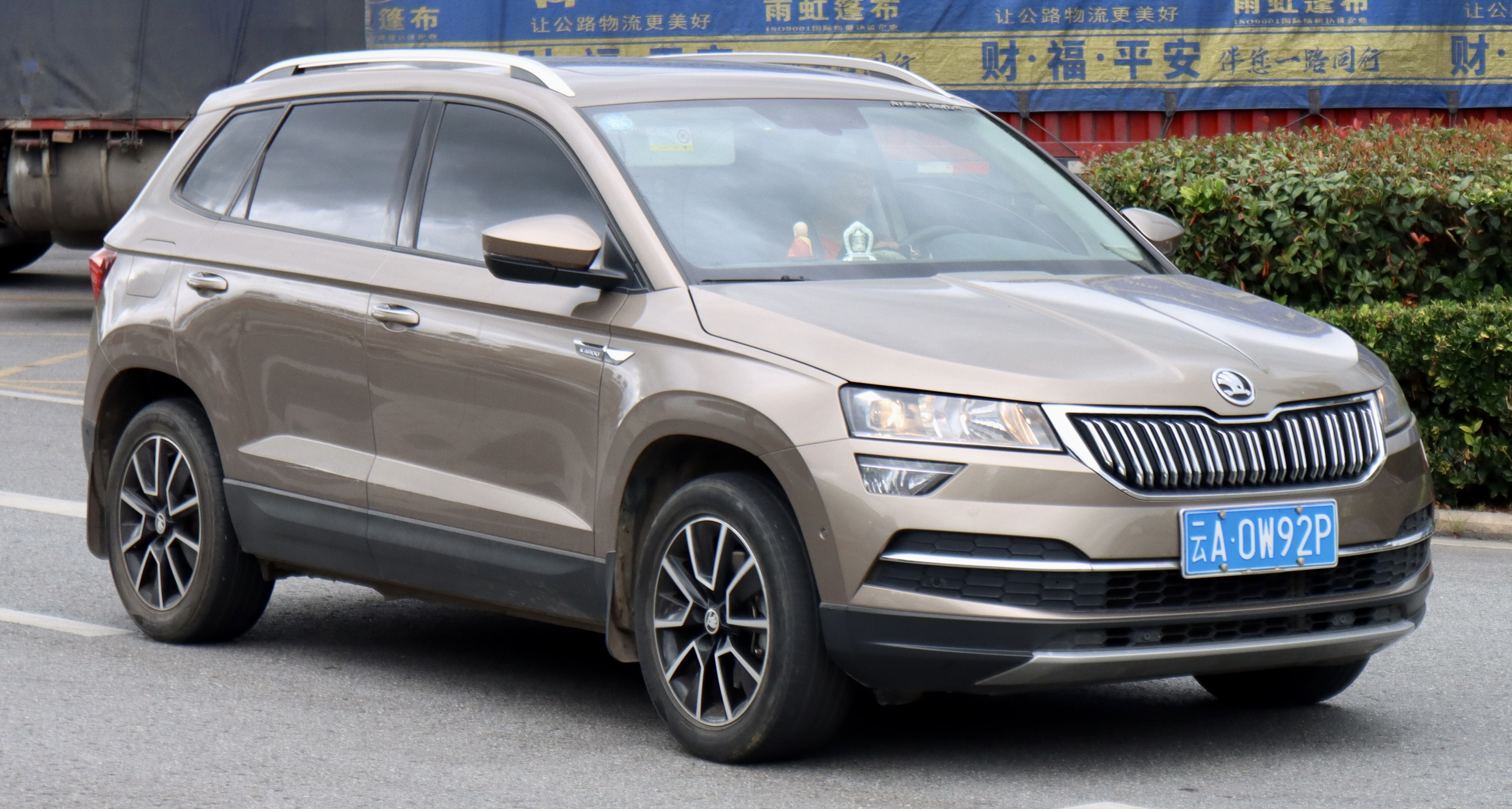
2018–2026
斯柯达柯珞克
Škoda Karoq

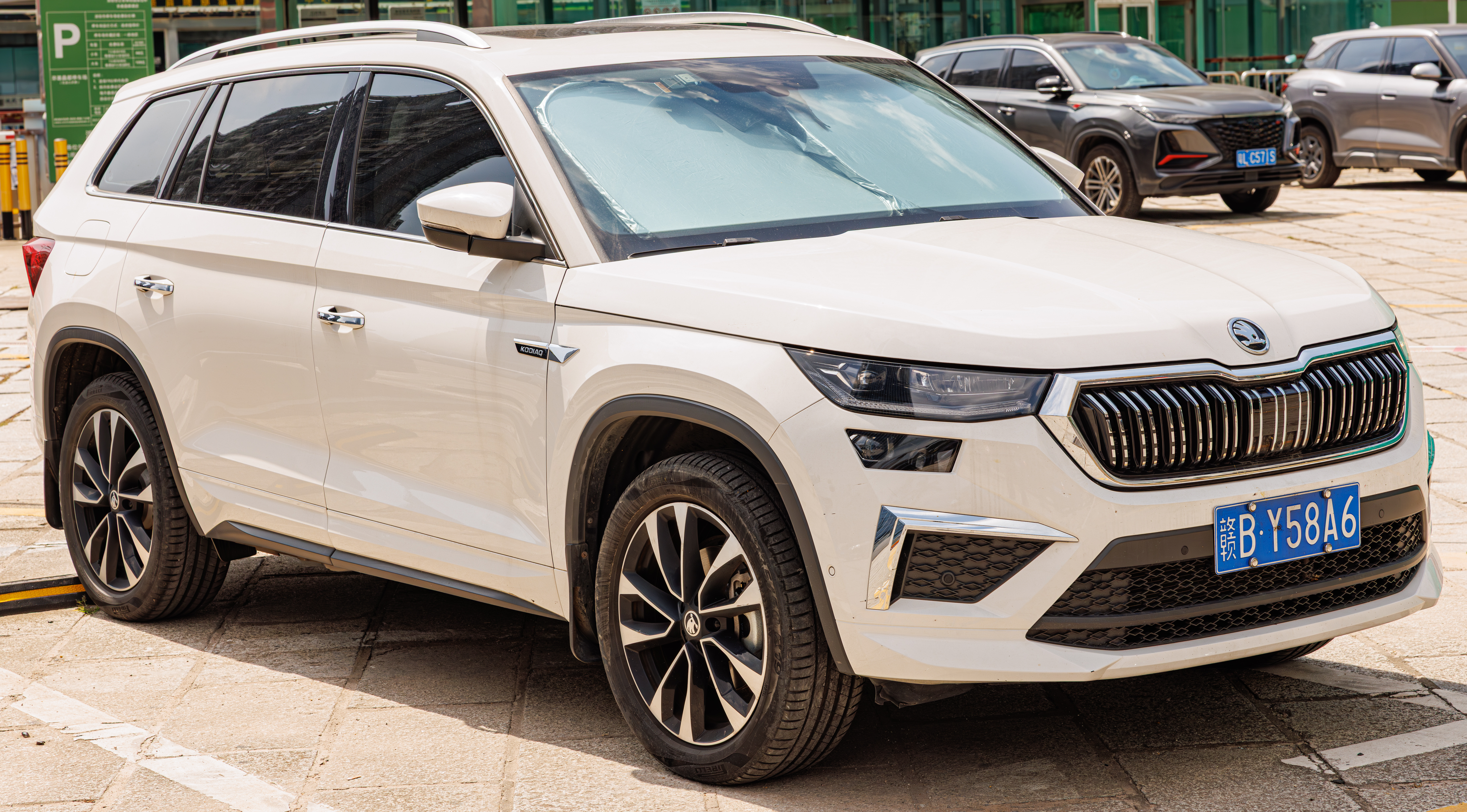
2016–2026
斯柯达柯迪亚克
Škoda Kodiaq

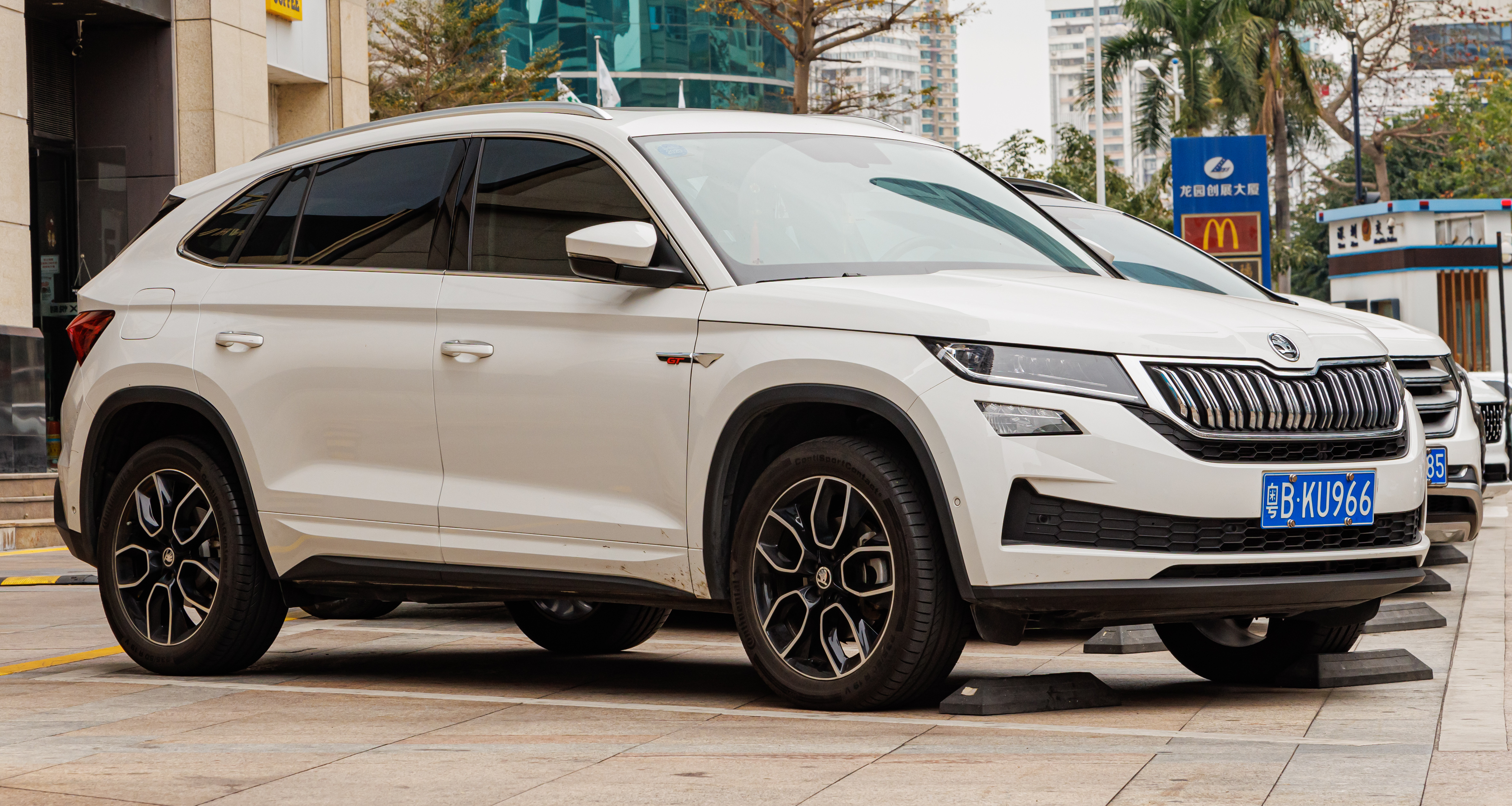
2018–2026
斯柯达柯迪亚克GT
Škoda Kodiaq GT

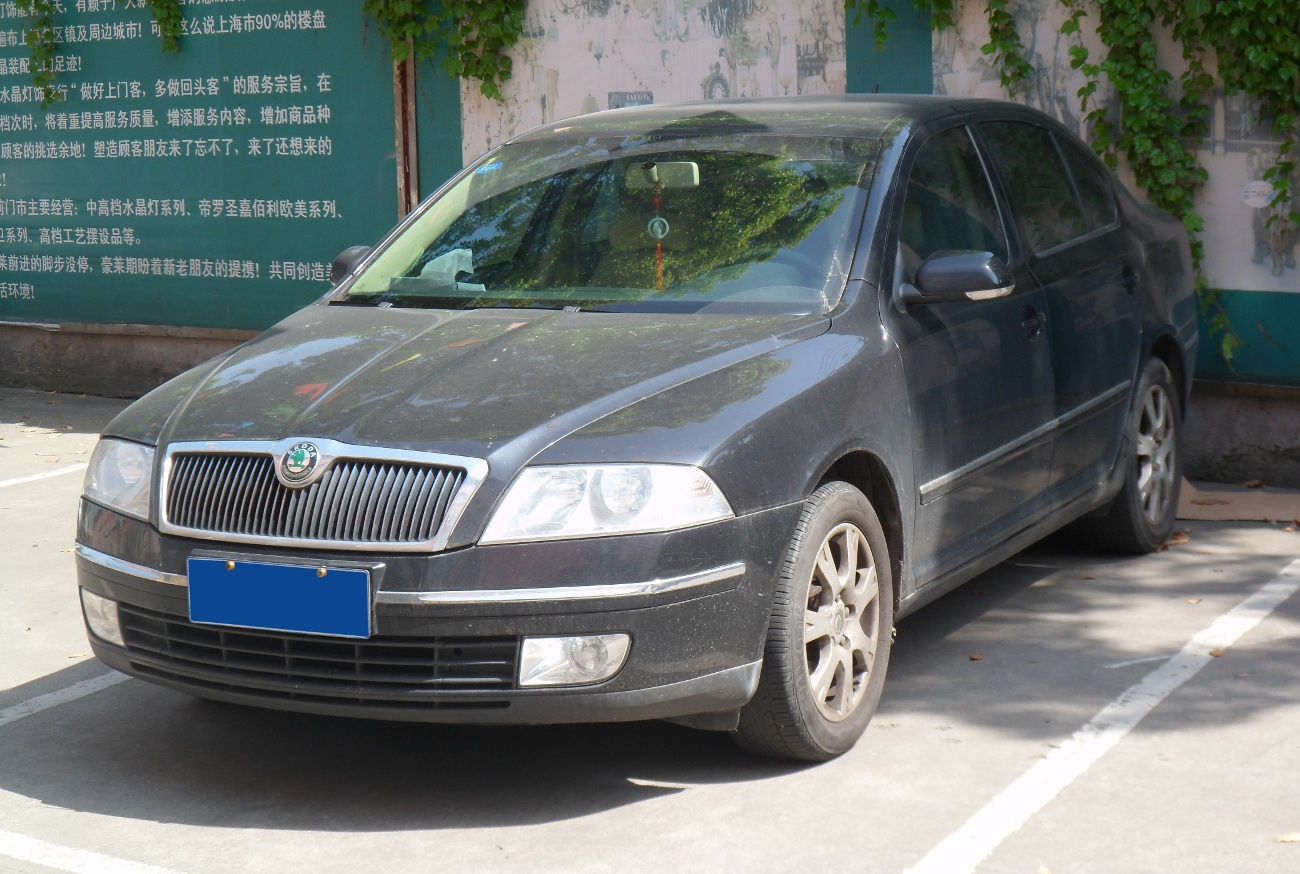
2006–2014
斯柯达明锐
Škoda Octavia II

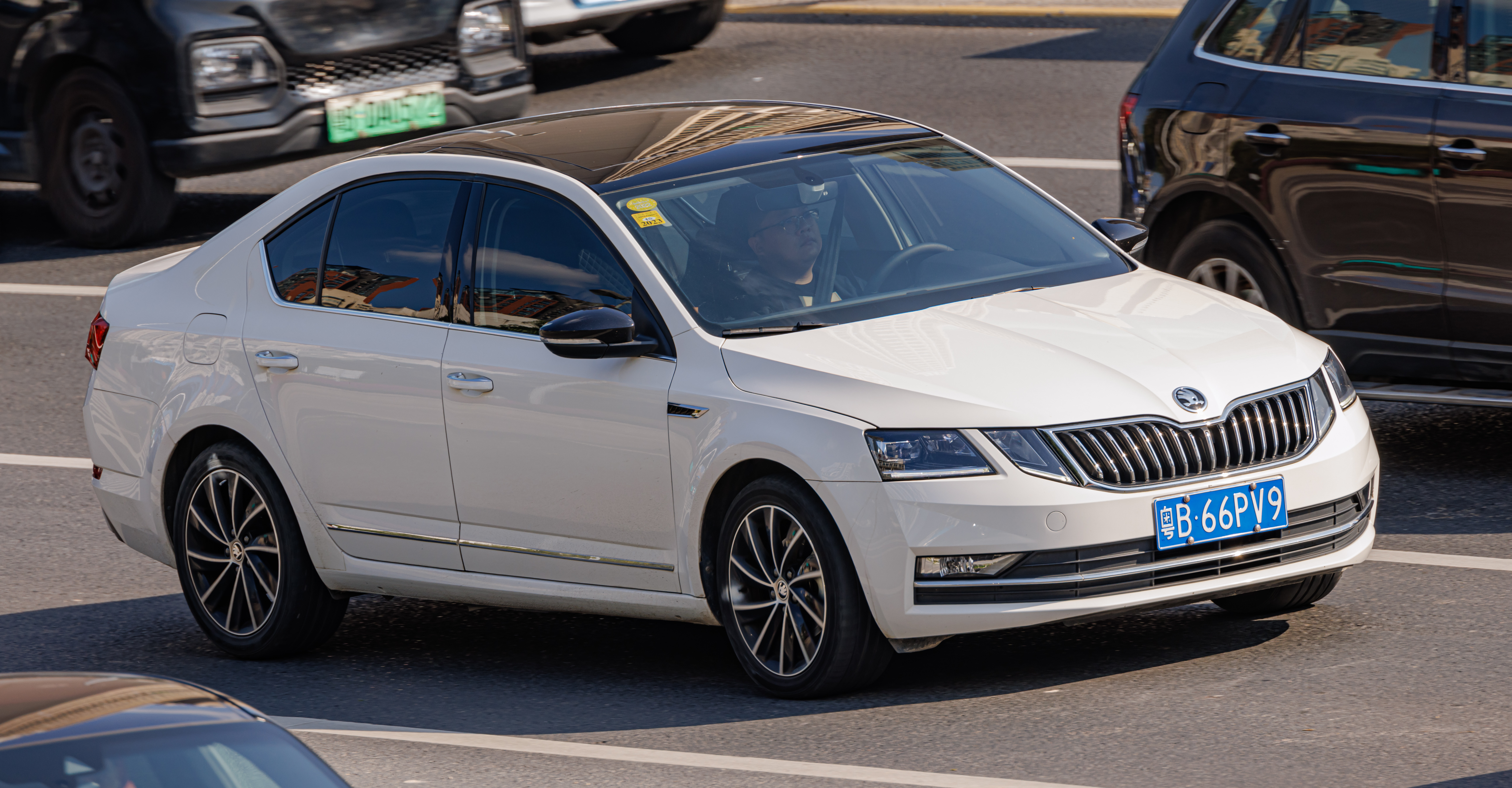
2014–2023
斯柯达明锐
Škoda Octavia III

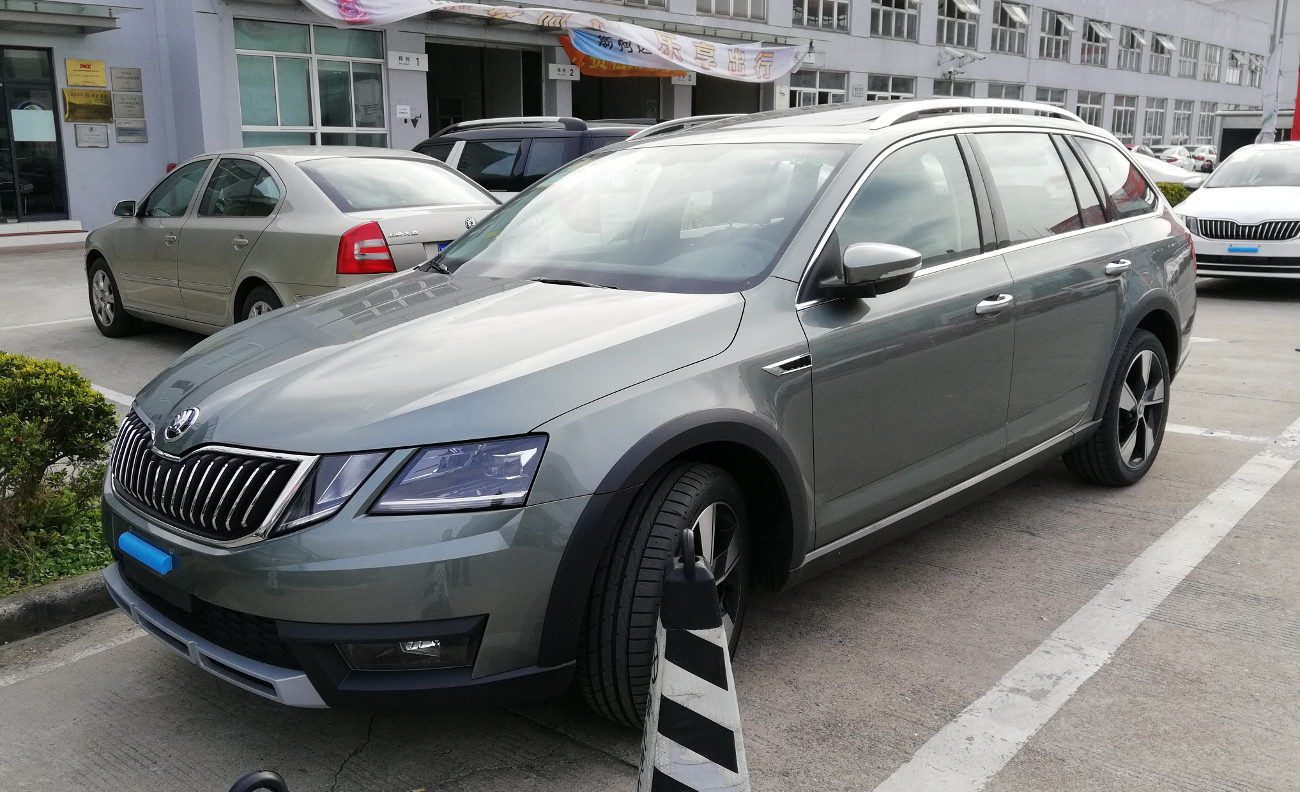
2014–2023
斯柯达明锐
Škoda Octavia Combi

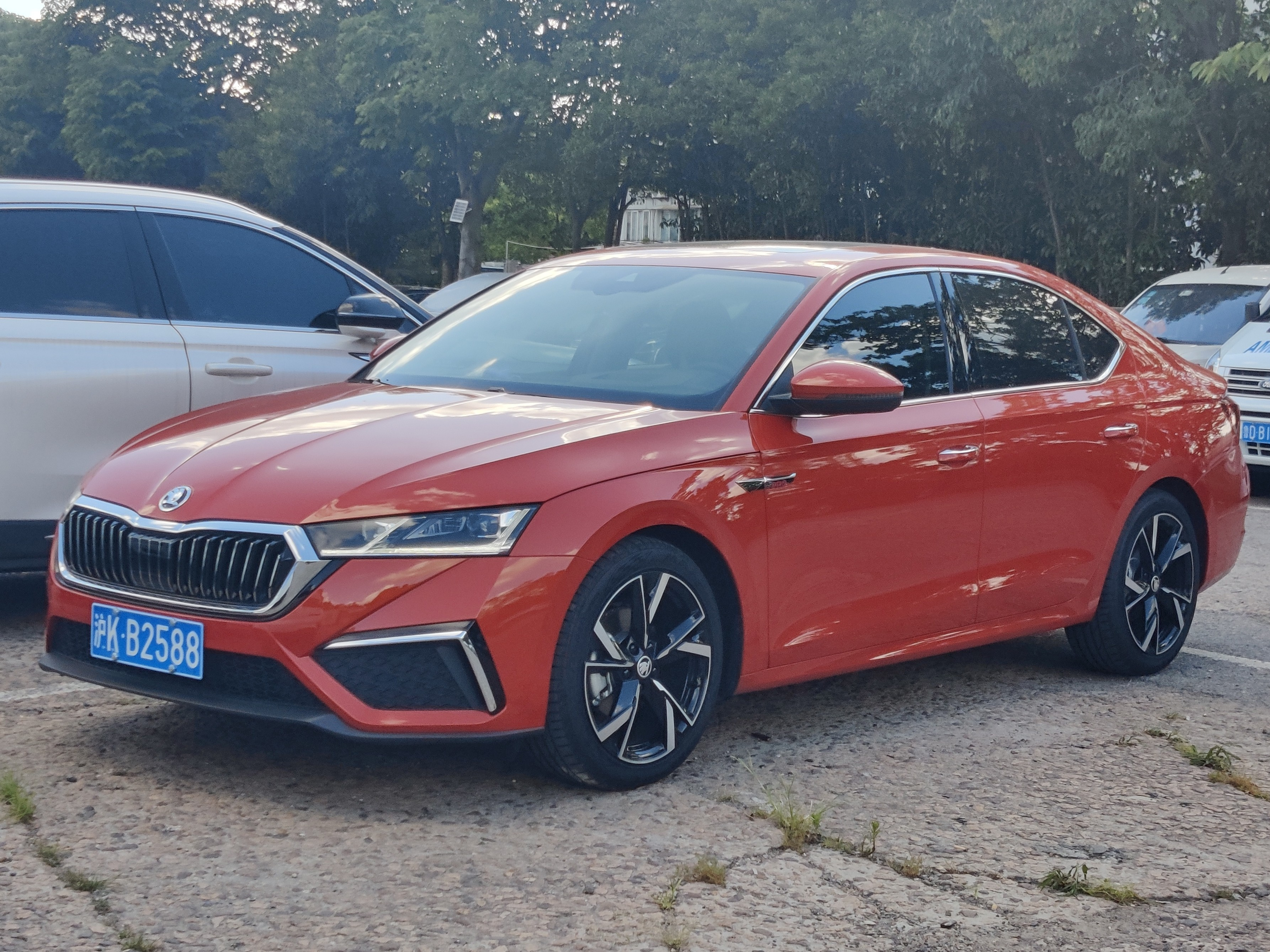
2021–2026
斯柯达明锐Pro
Škoda Octavia Pro

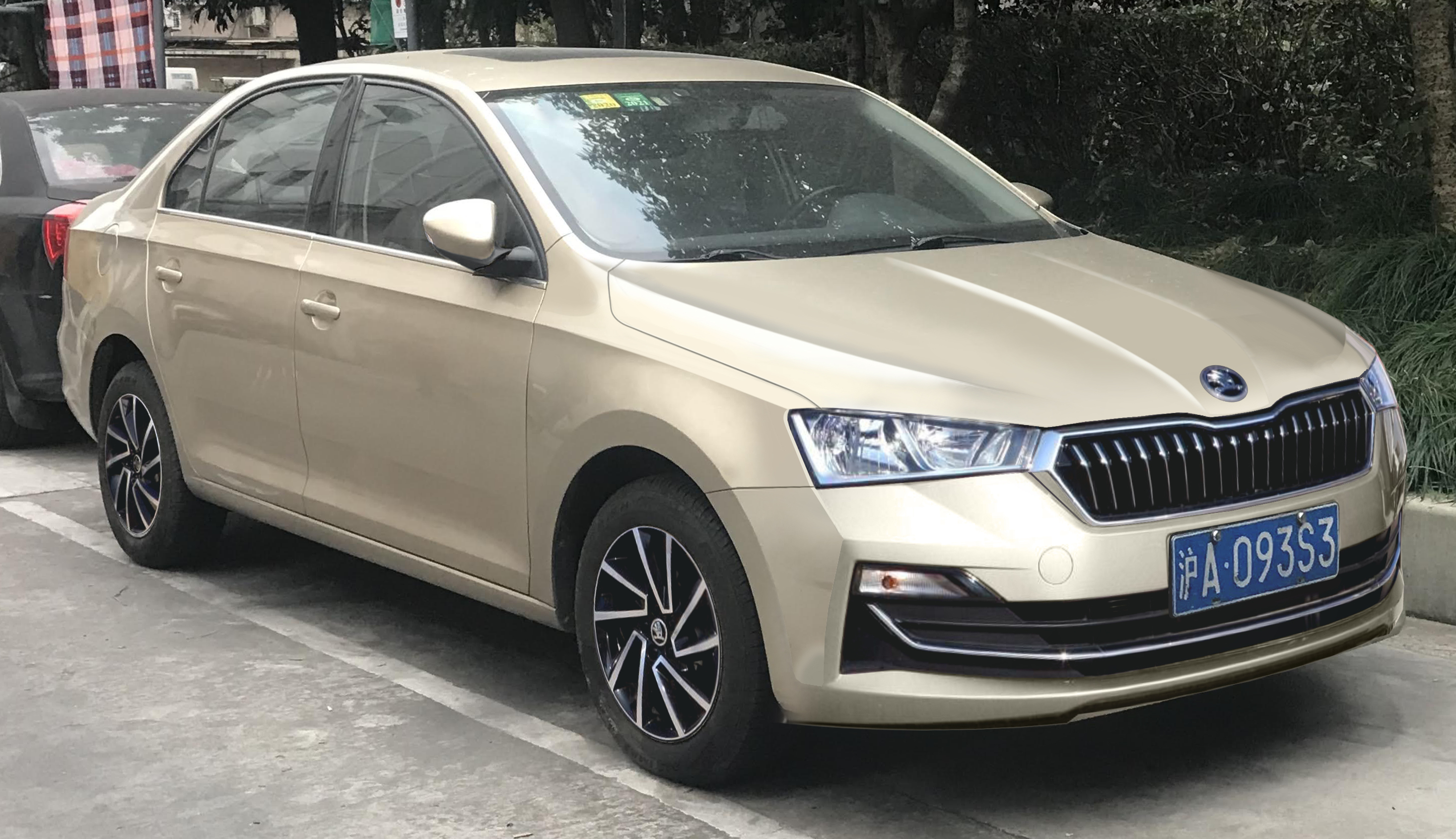
2013–2023
斯柯达昕锐
Škoda Rapid

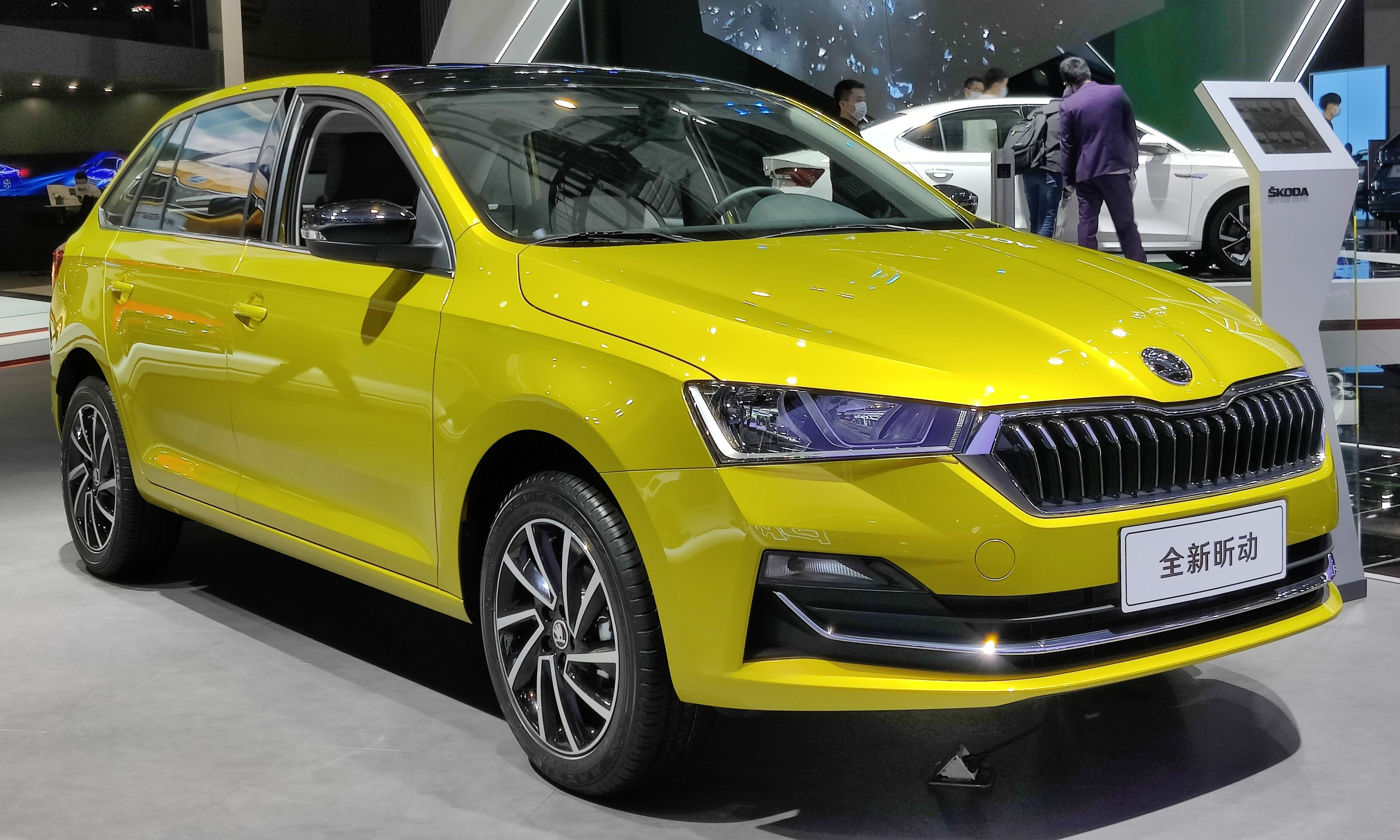
2014–2023
斯柯达昕动
Škoda Rapid Spaceback

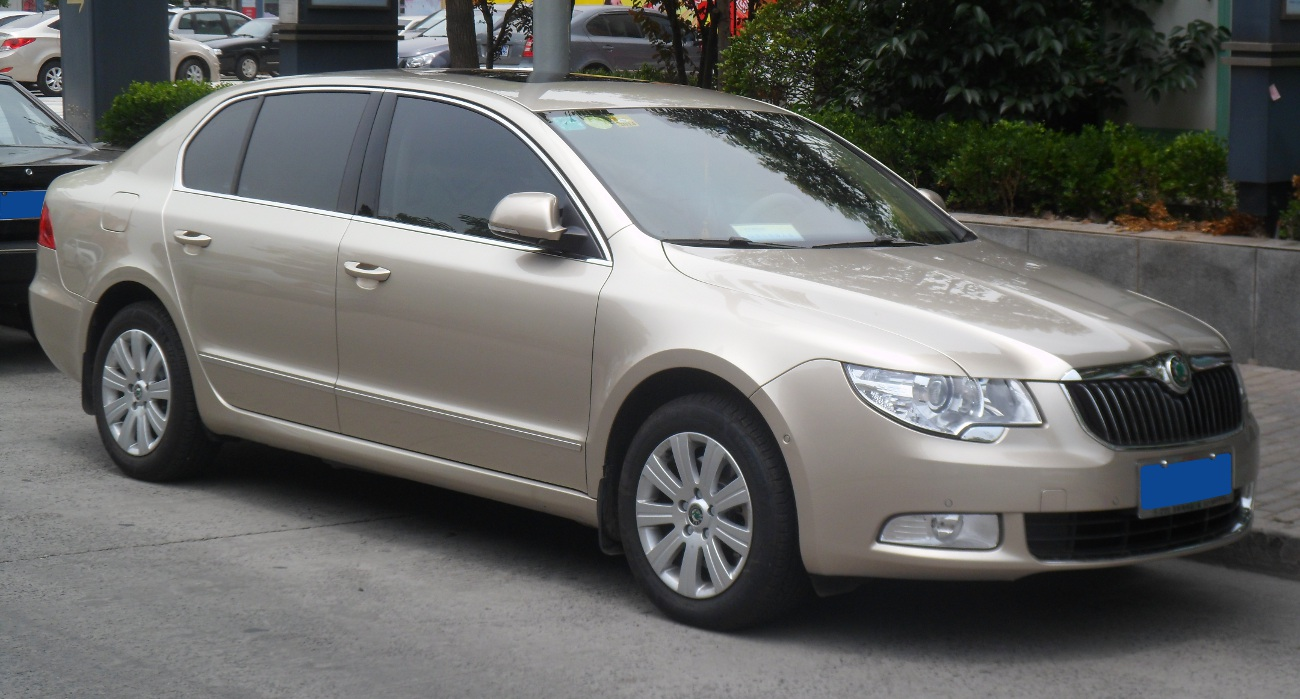
2008–2013
斯柯达昊锐
Škoda Superb II

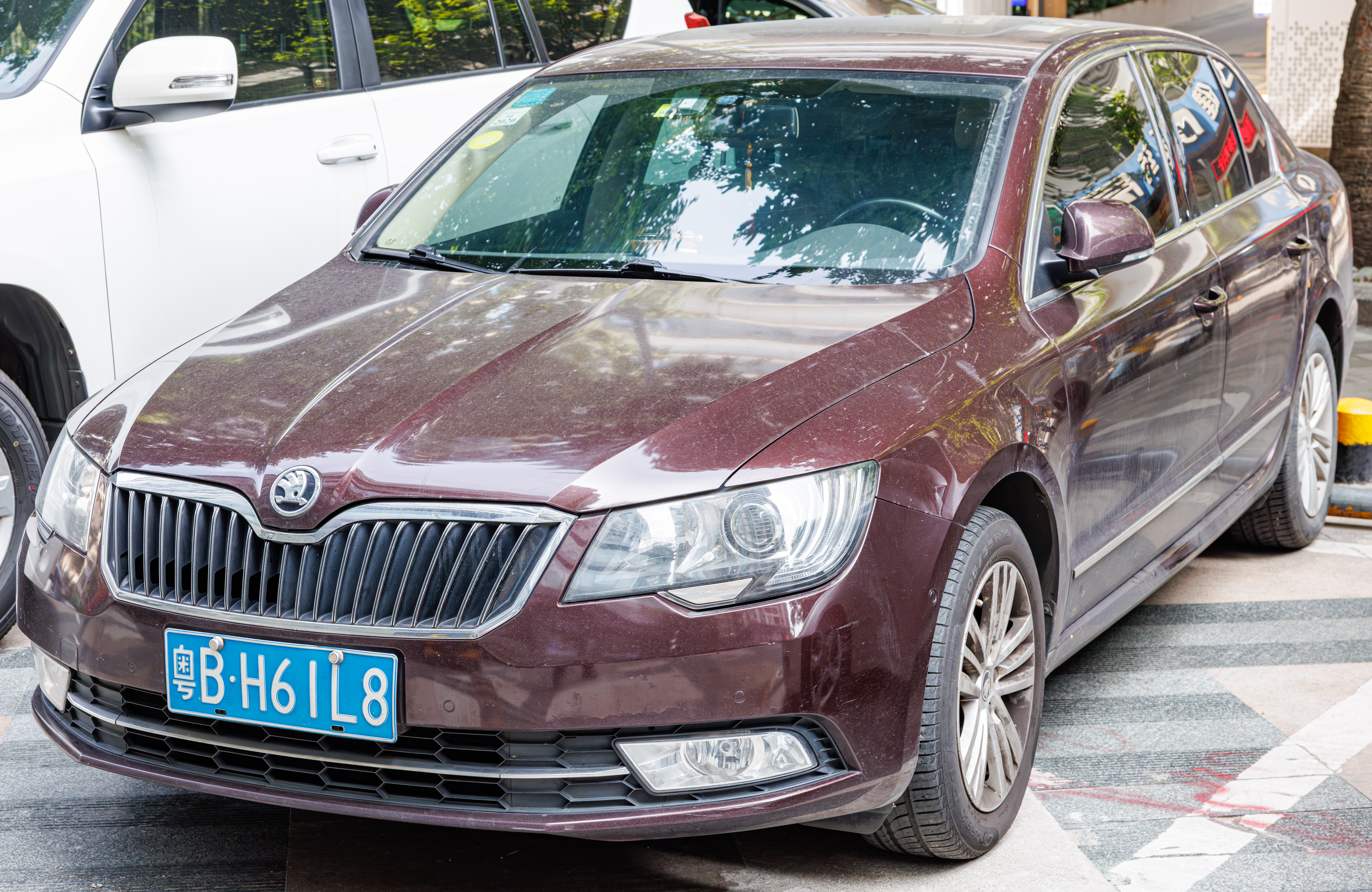
2013–2016
斯柯达速派
Škoda Superb II

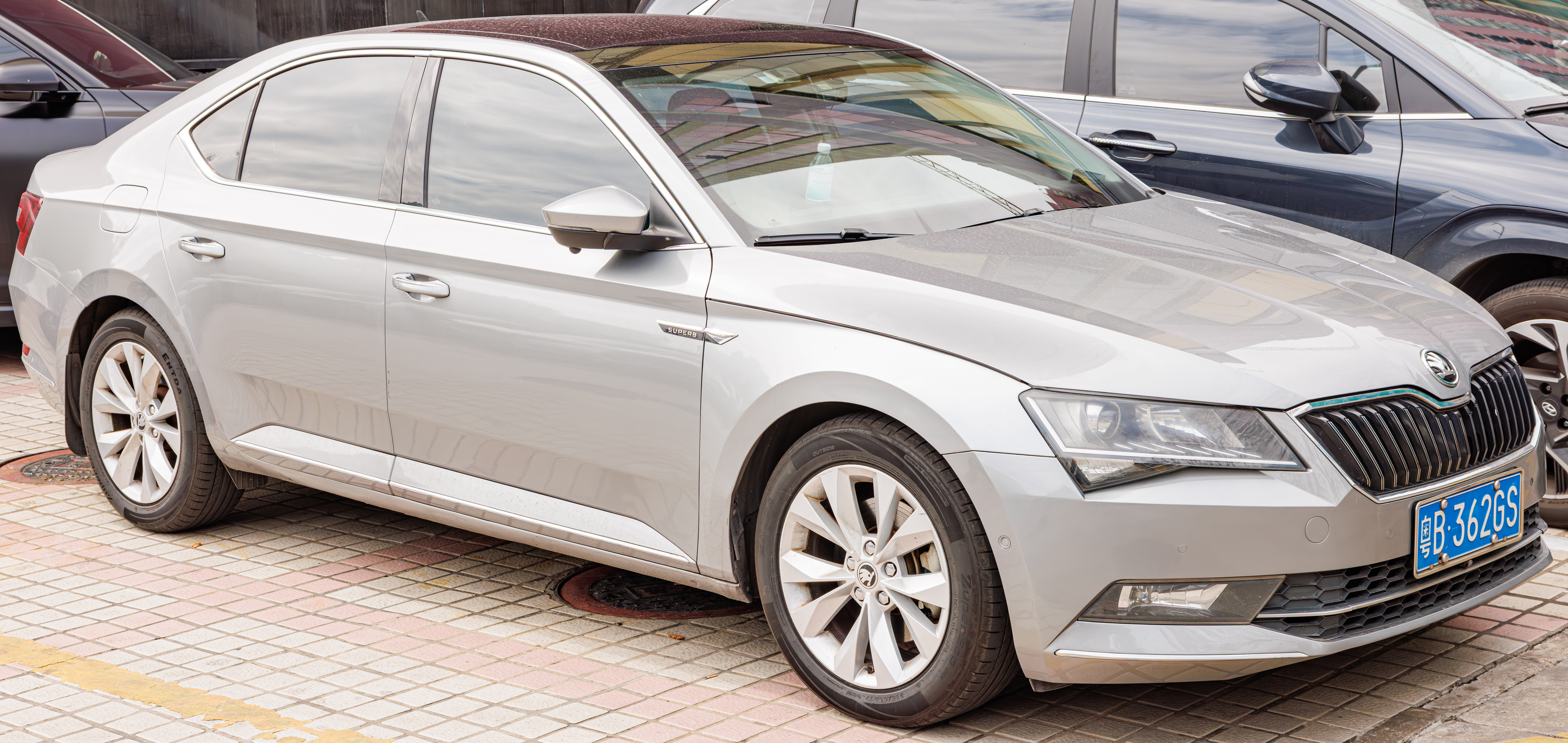
2016–2026
斯柯达速派
Škoda Superb III

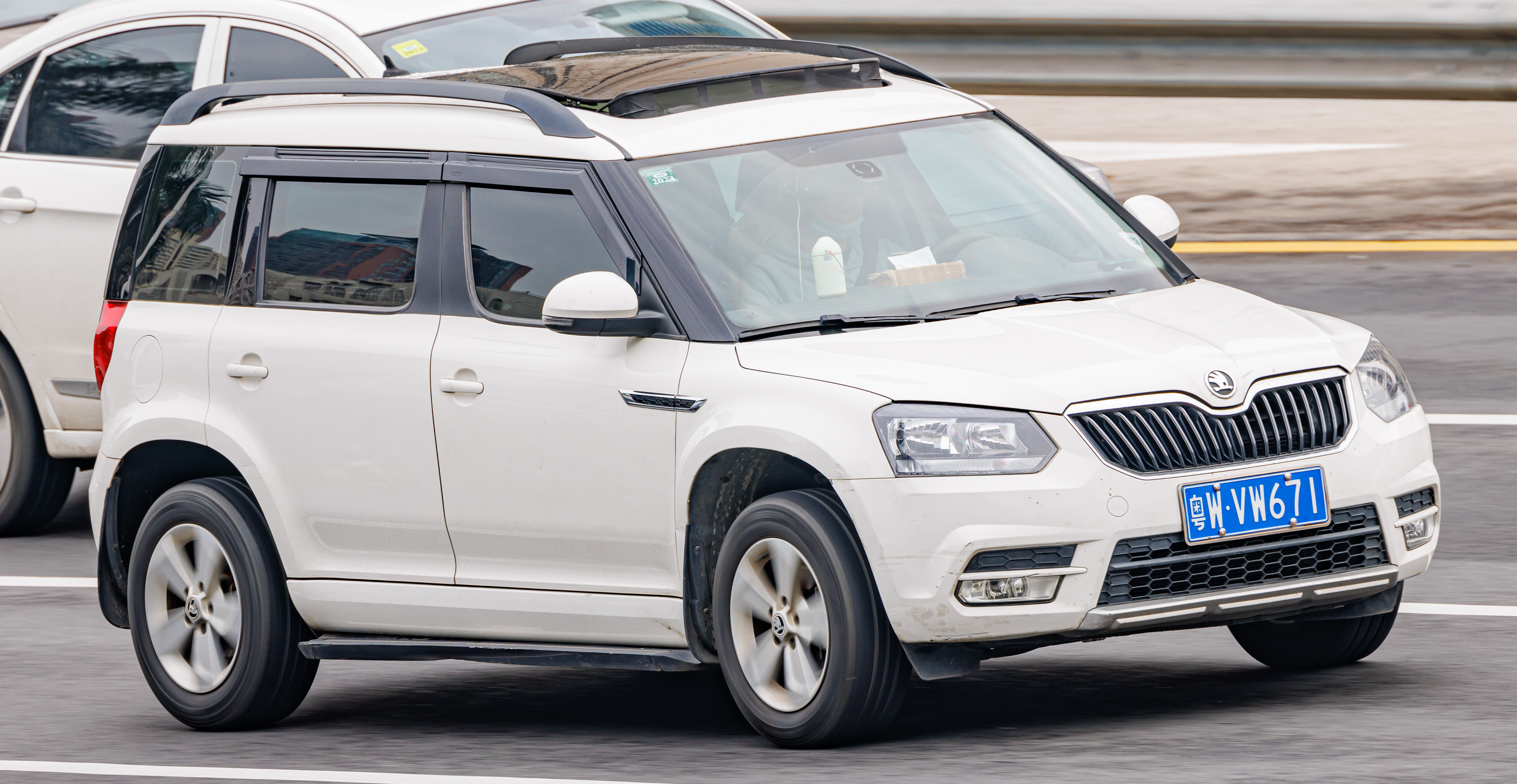
2013–2017
斯柯达野帝
Škoda Yeti

=== Volkswagen ===
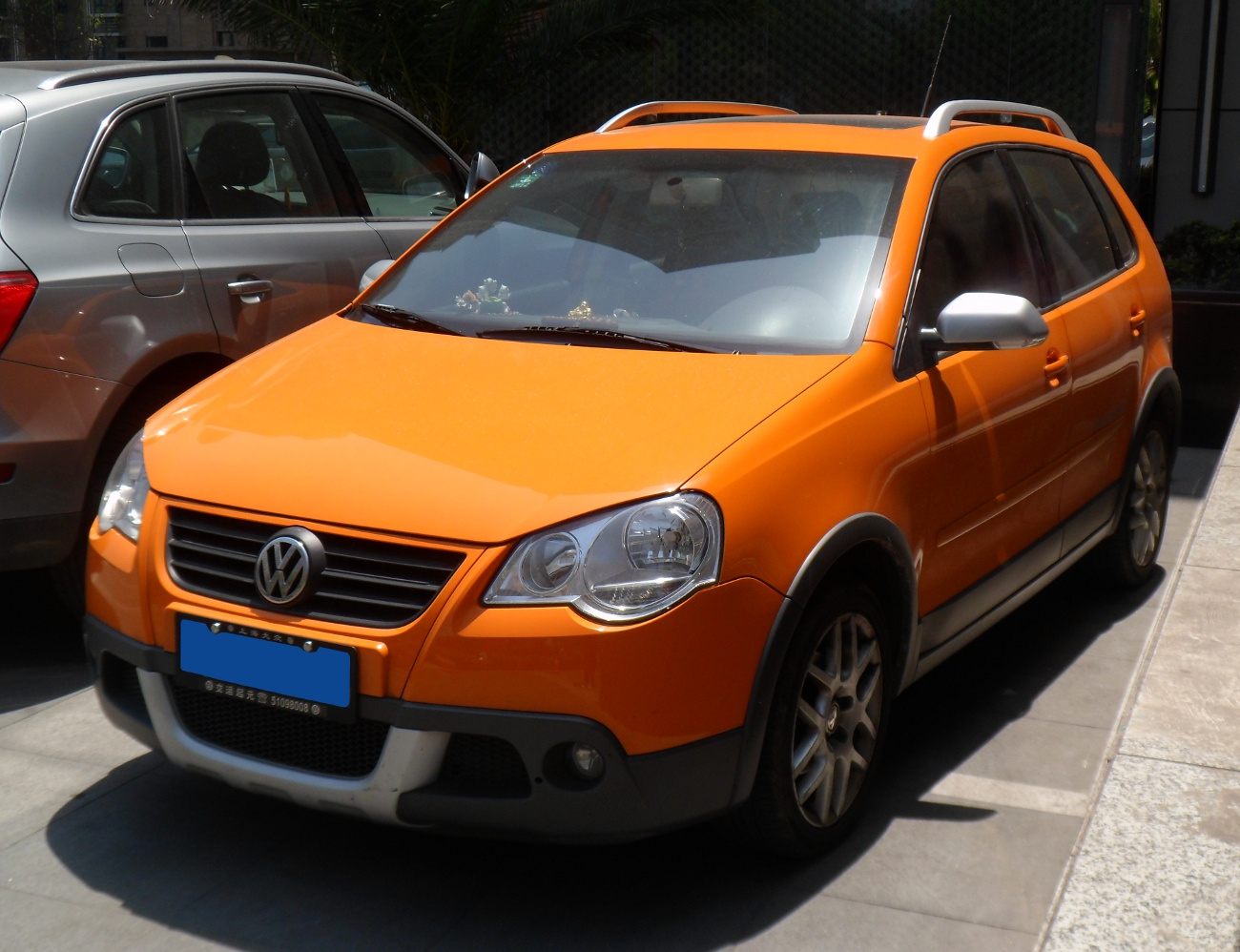
2005–2010
大众CrossPolo Mk4
Volkswagen CrossPolo Mk4

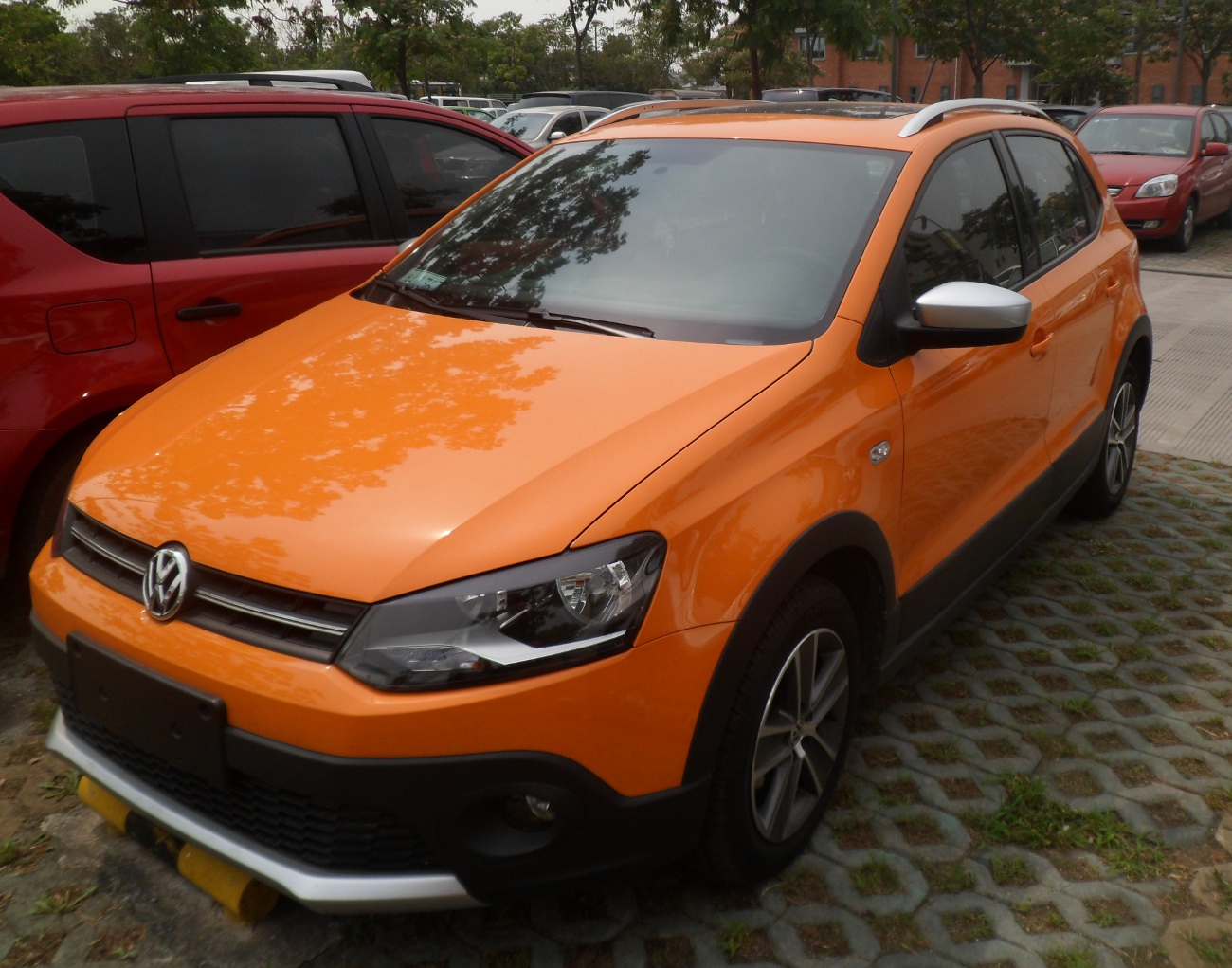
2010–2019
大众CrossPolo Mk5
Volkswagen CrossPolo Mk5

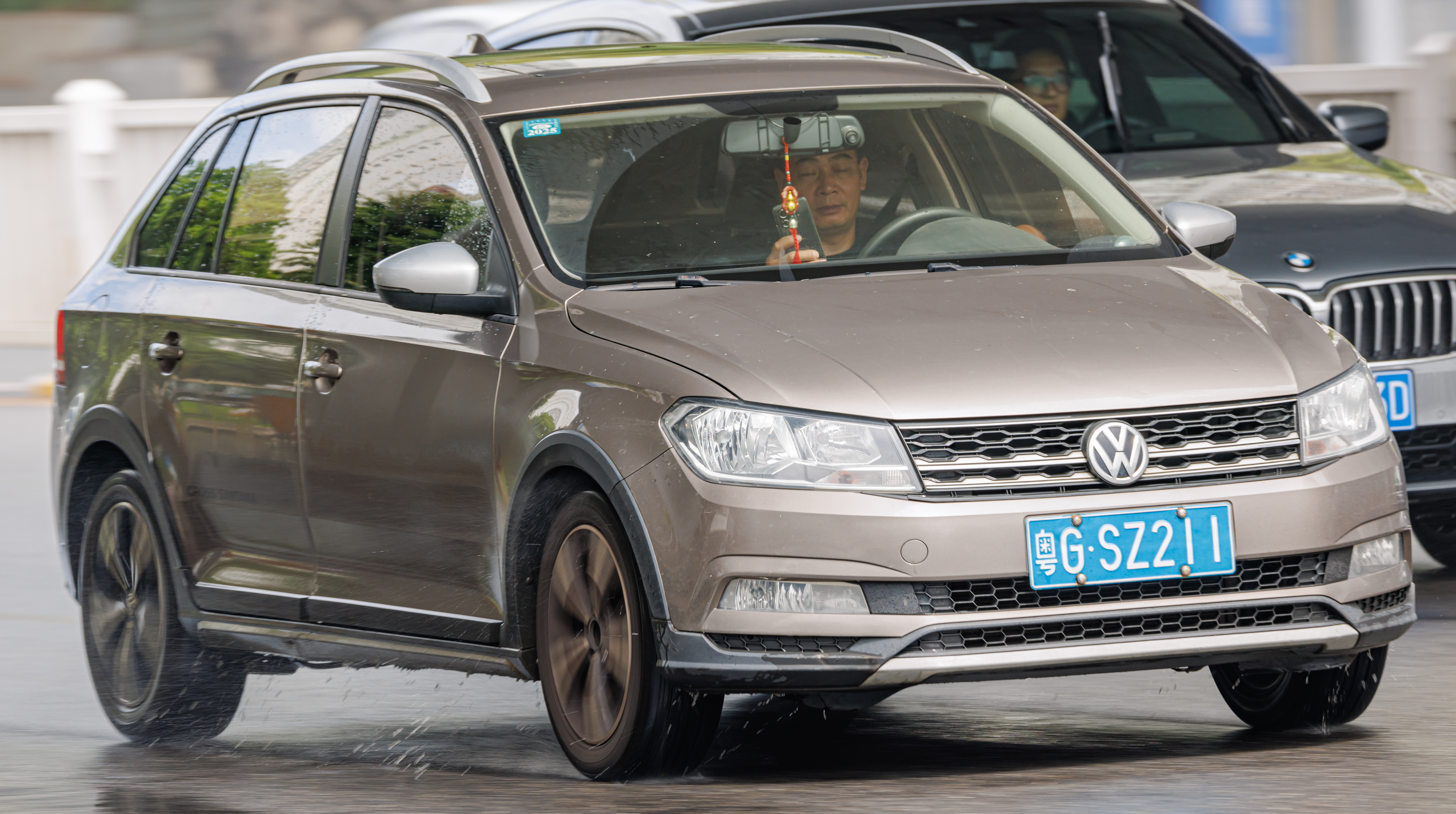
2016–2023
大众桑塔纳CROSS
Volkswagen Cross Santana

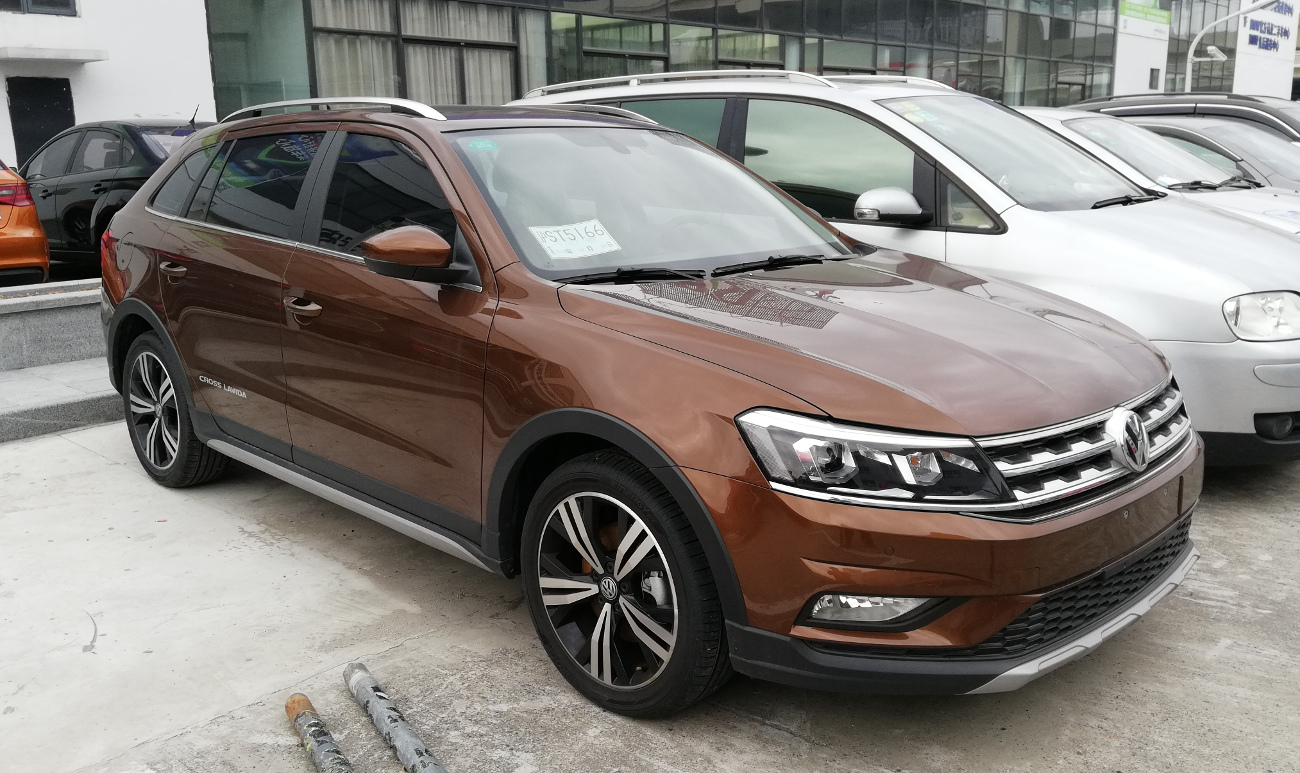
2013–2017
大众朗境
Volkswagen Cross Lavida

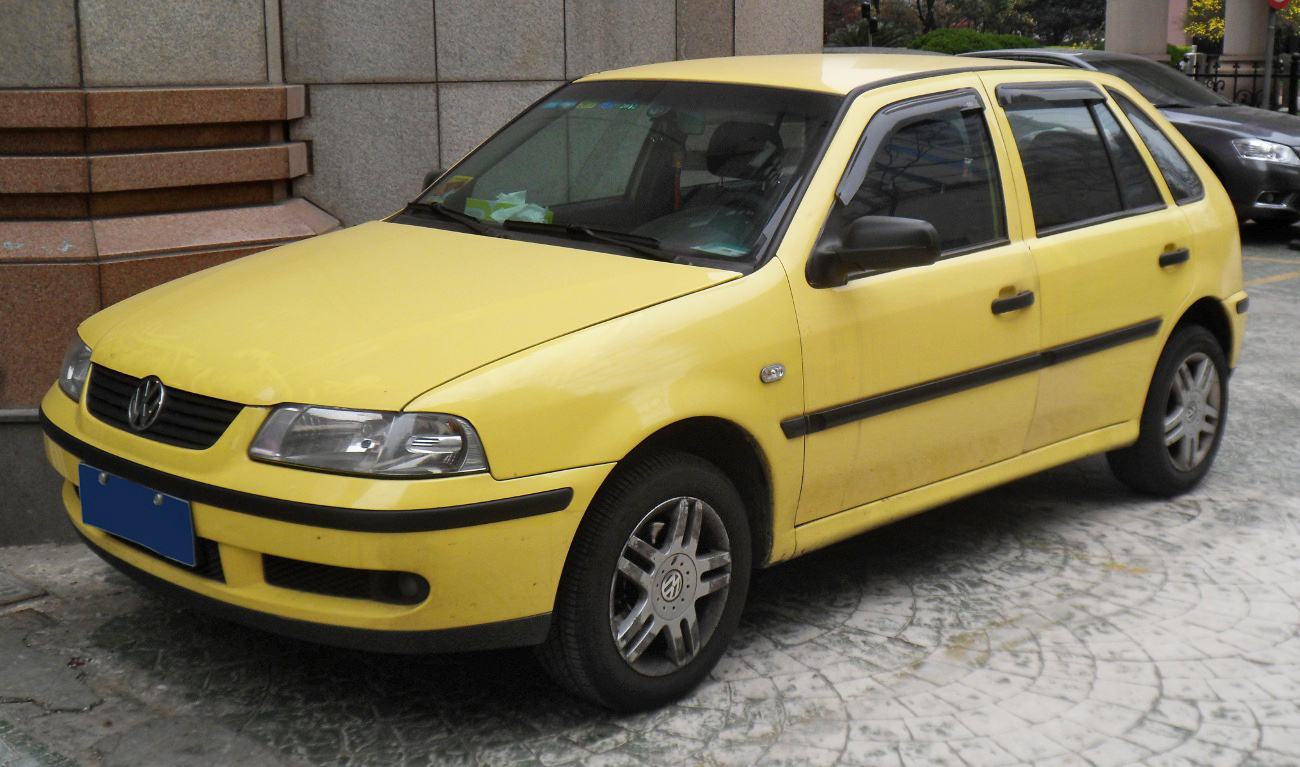
2003–2008
大众高尔
Volkswagen Gol

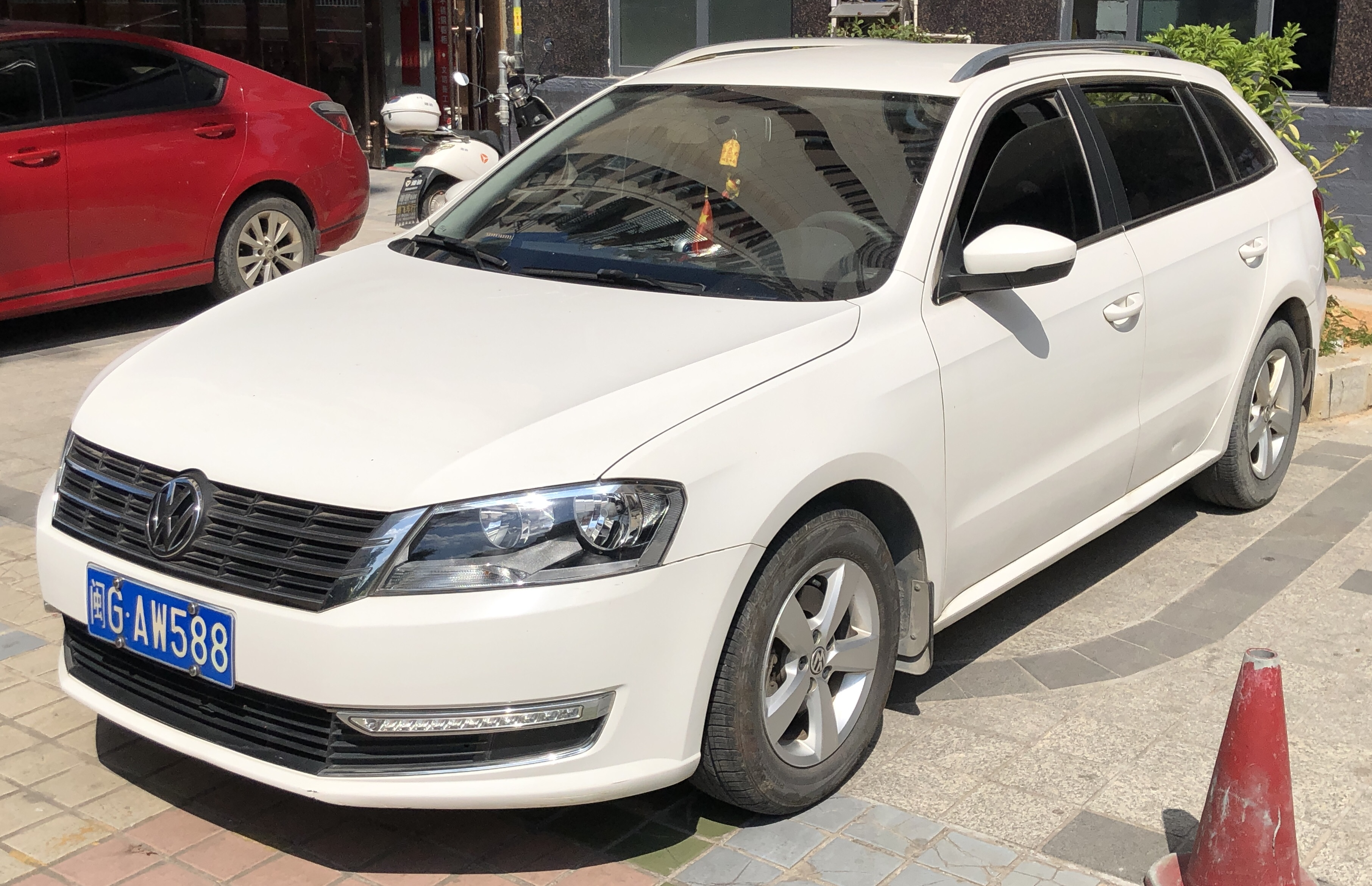
2013–2017
大众朗行
Volkswagen Gran Lavida

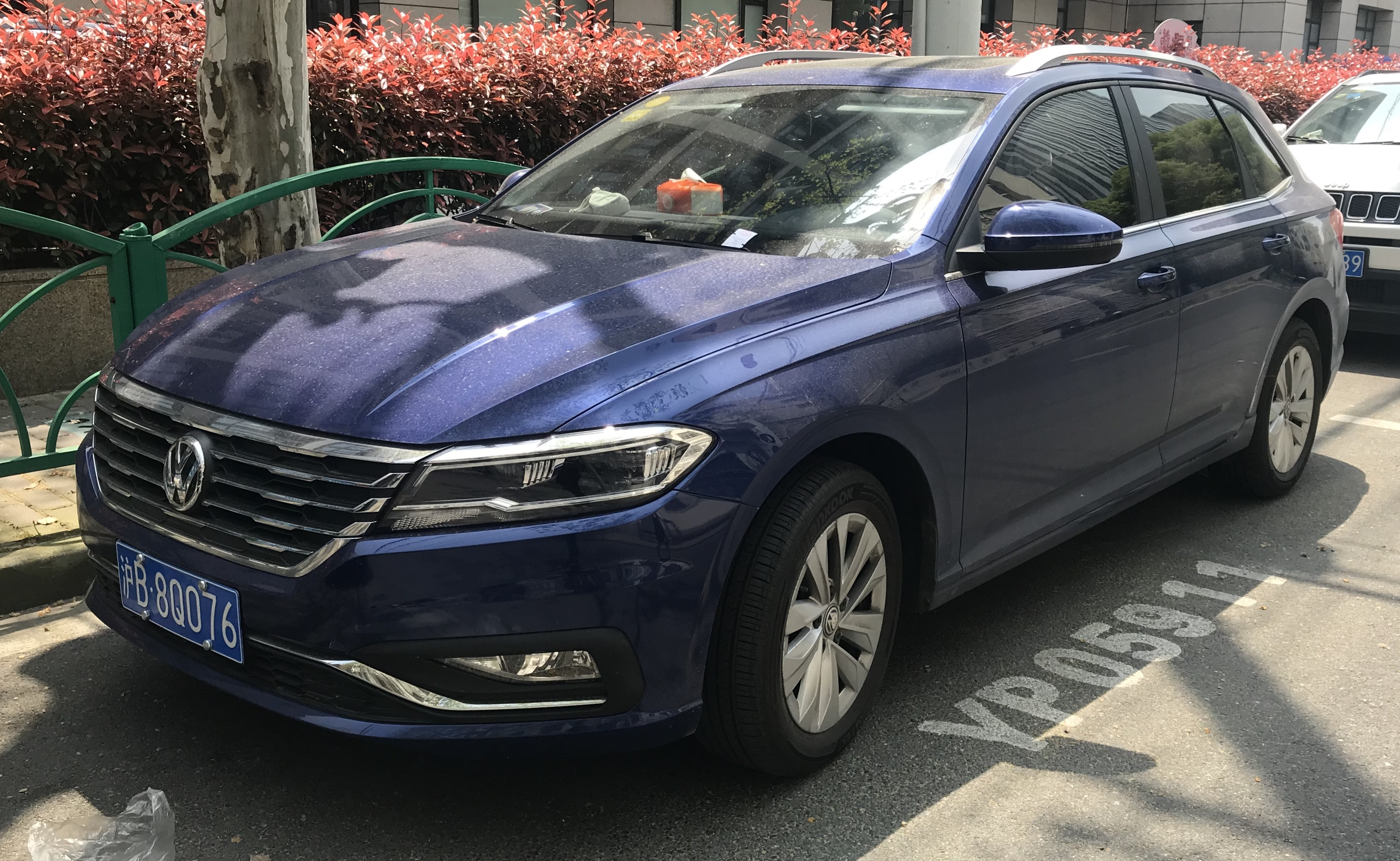
2018–2019
大众朗逸兩厢
Volkswagen Gran Lavida

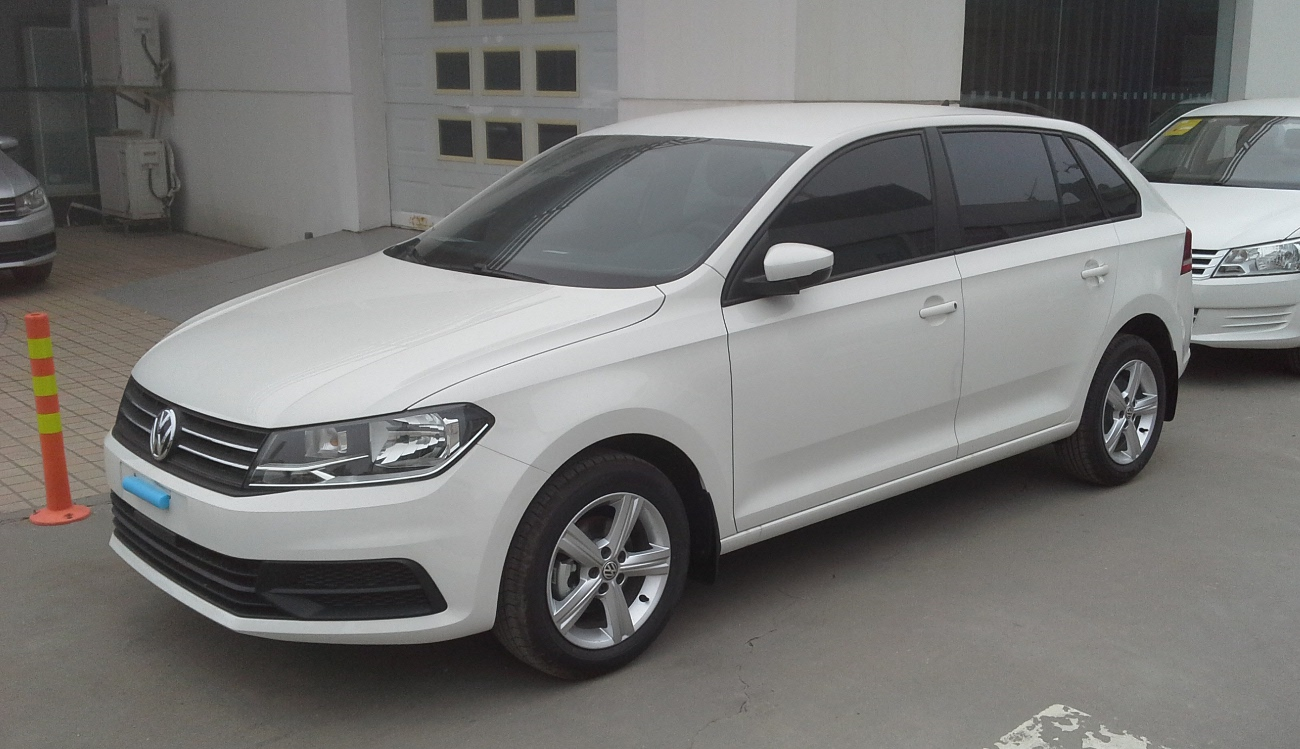
2015–2023
大众桑塔纳浩纳
Volkswagen Gran Santana

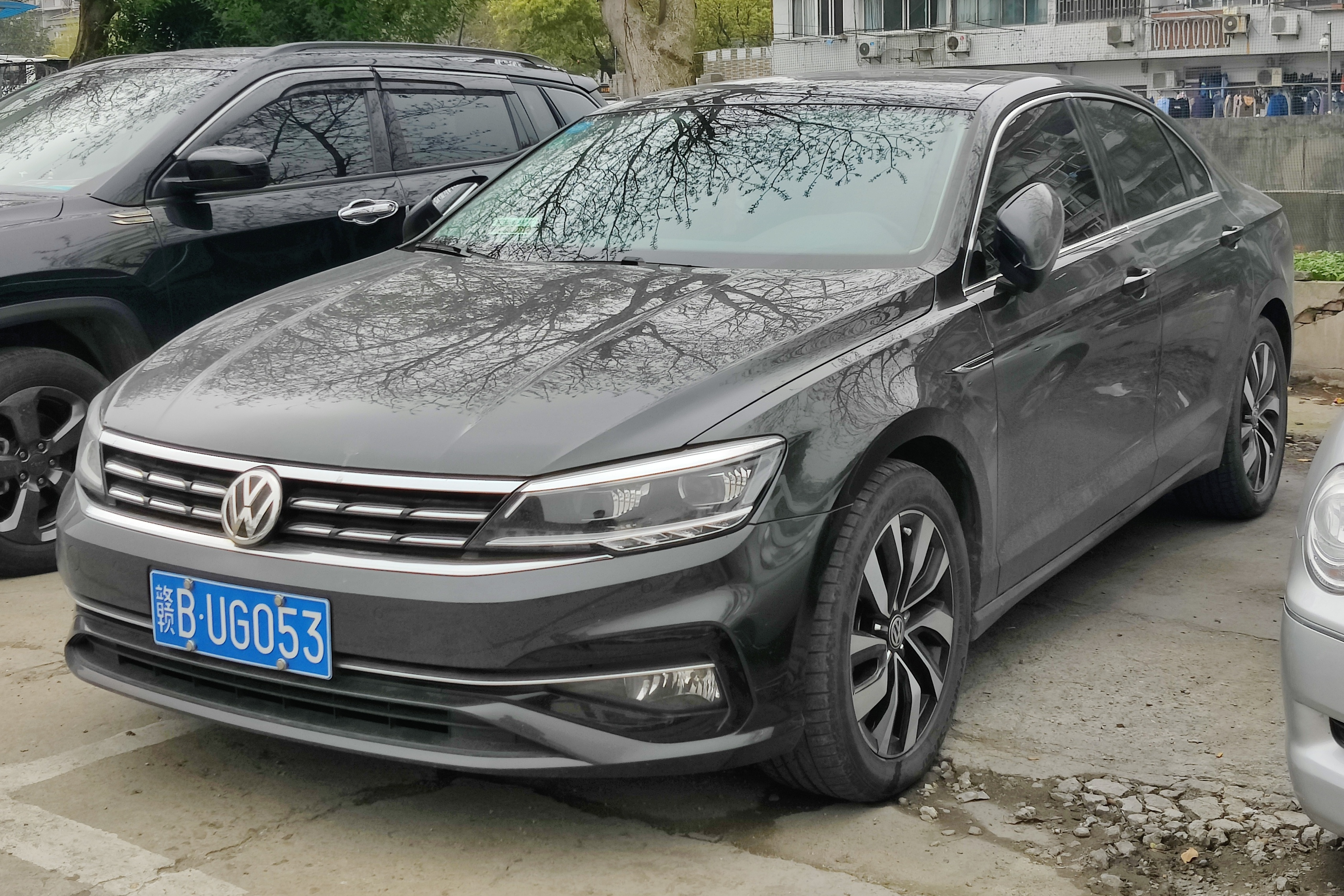
2014–2022
大众凌渡
Volkswagen Lamando I

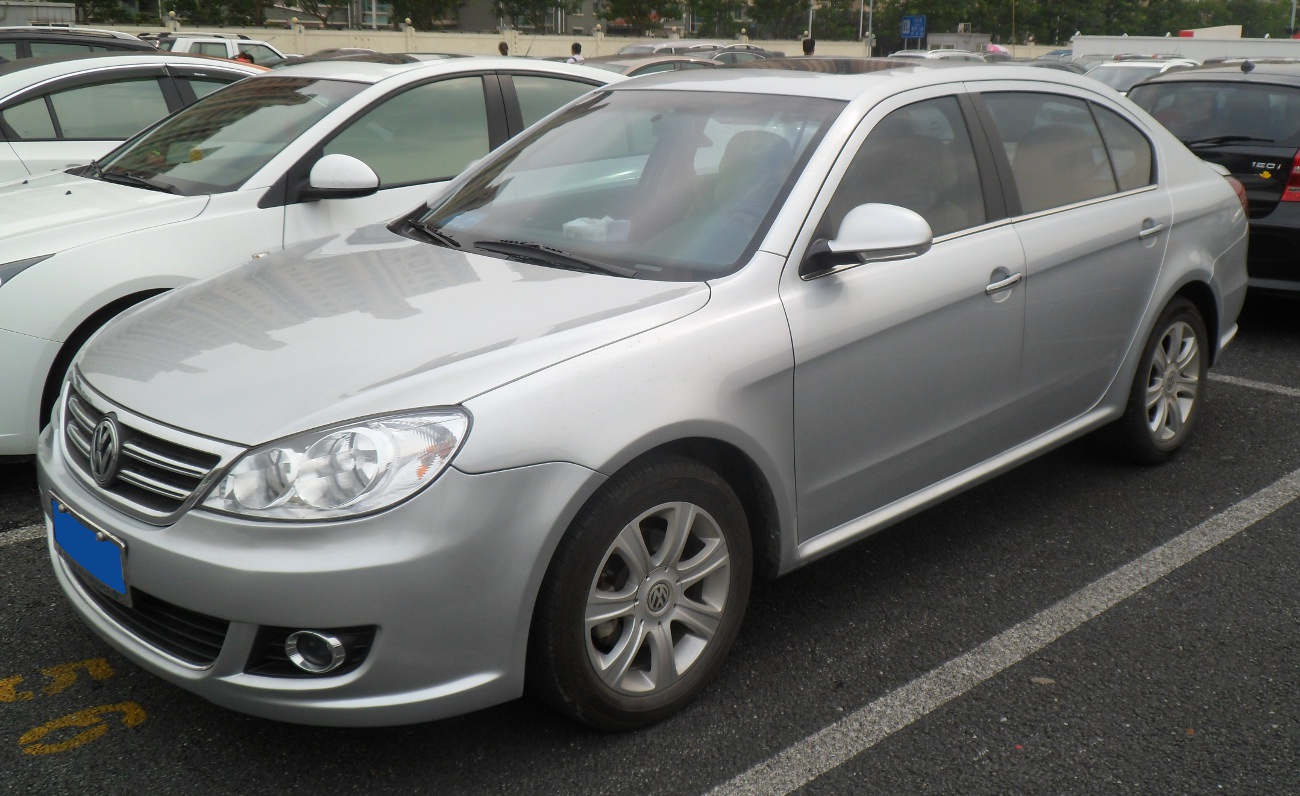
2008–2018
大众朗逸/朗逸经典
Volkswagen Lavida I

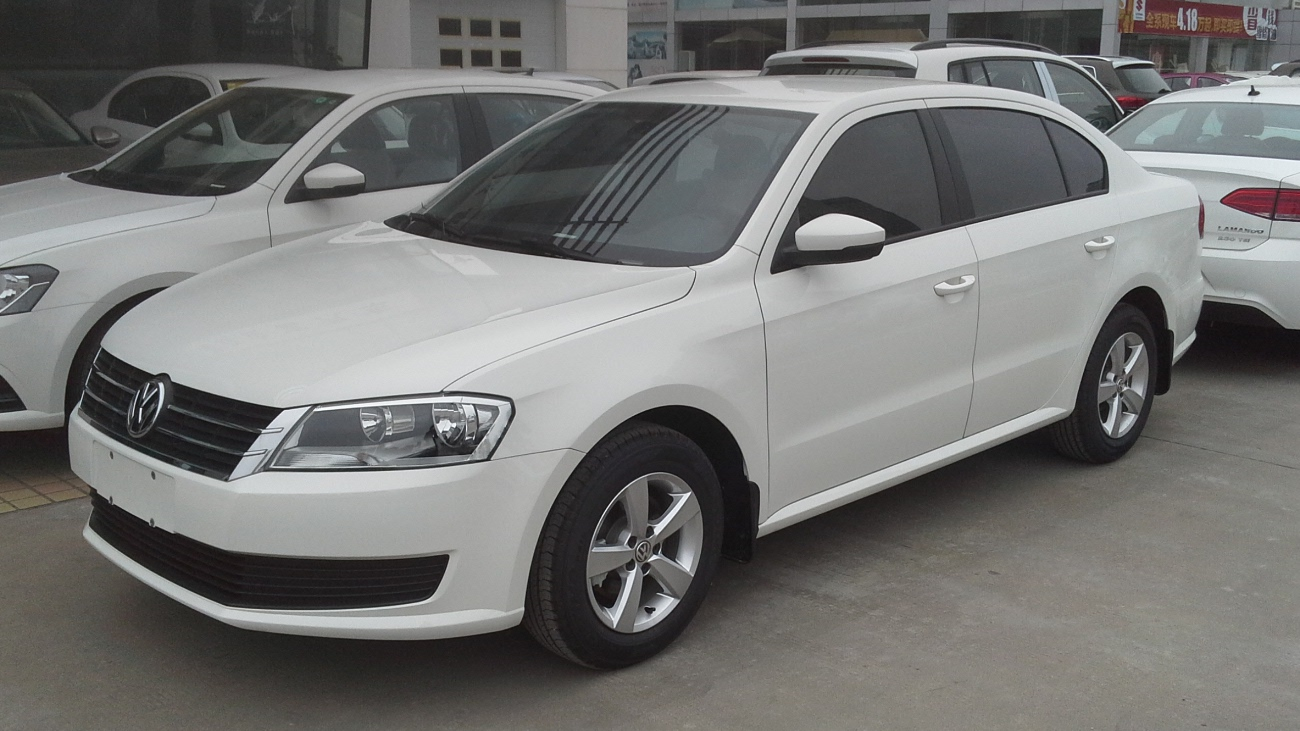
2012–2023
大众朗逸/朗逸启航
Volkswagen Lavida II

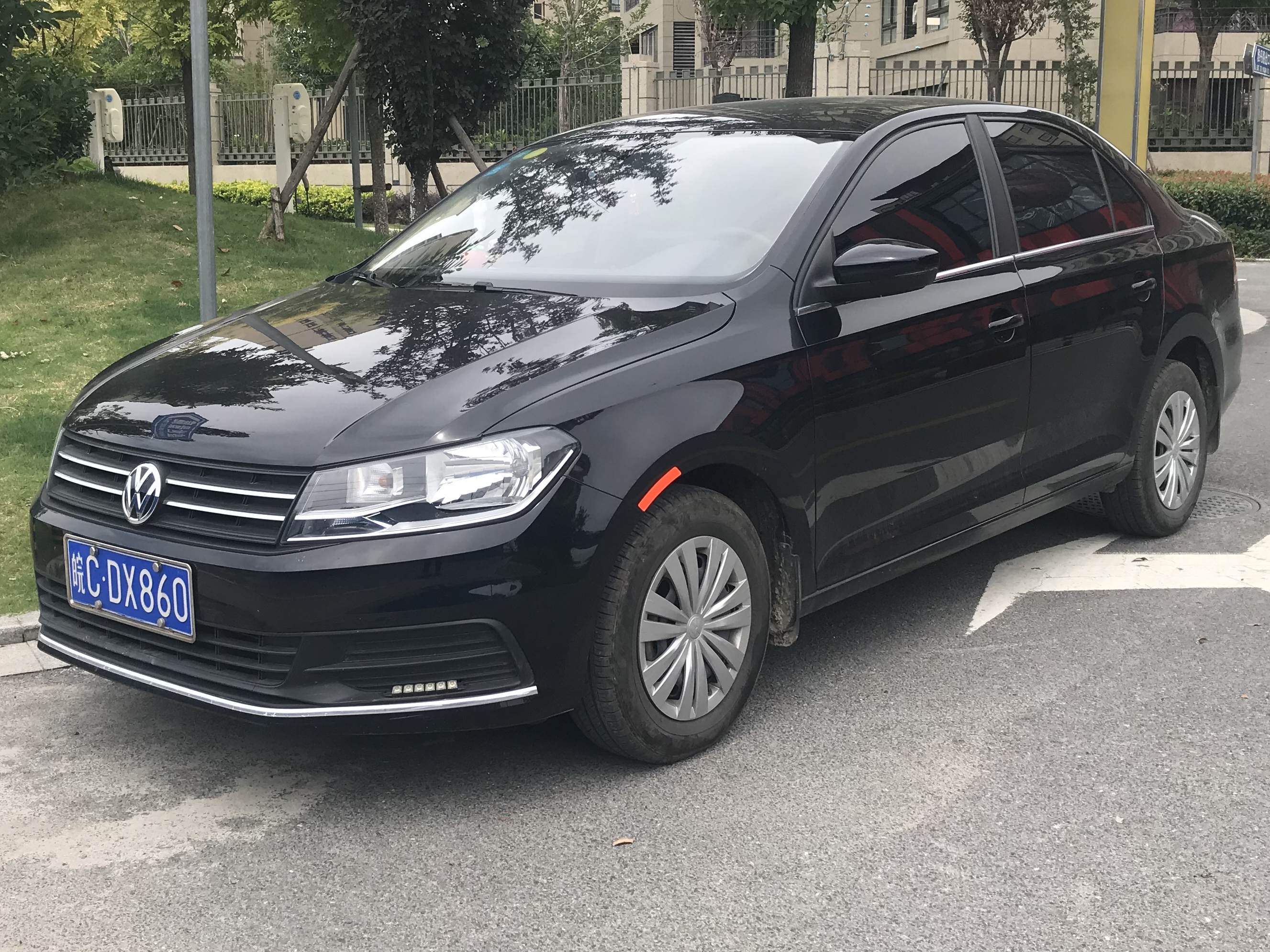
2012–2023
大众新桑塔纳
Volkswagen New Santana

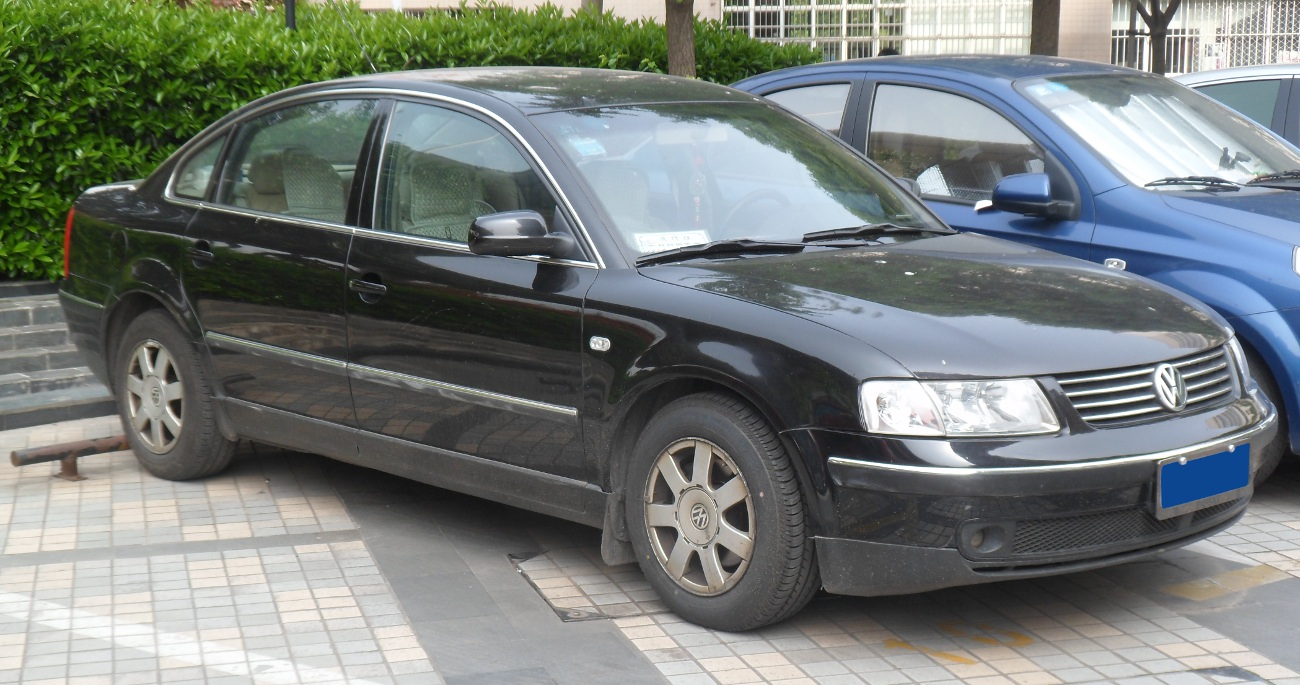
1999–2005
大众帕萨特B5
Volkswagen Passat B5

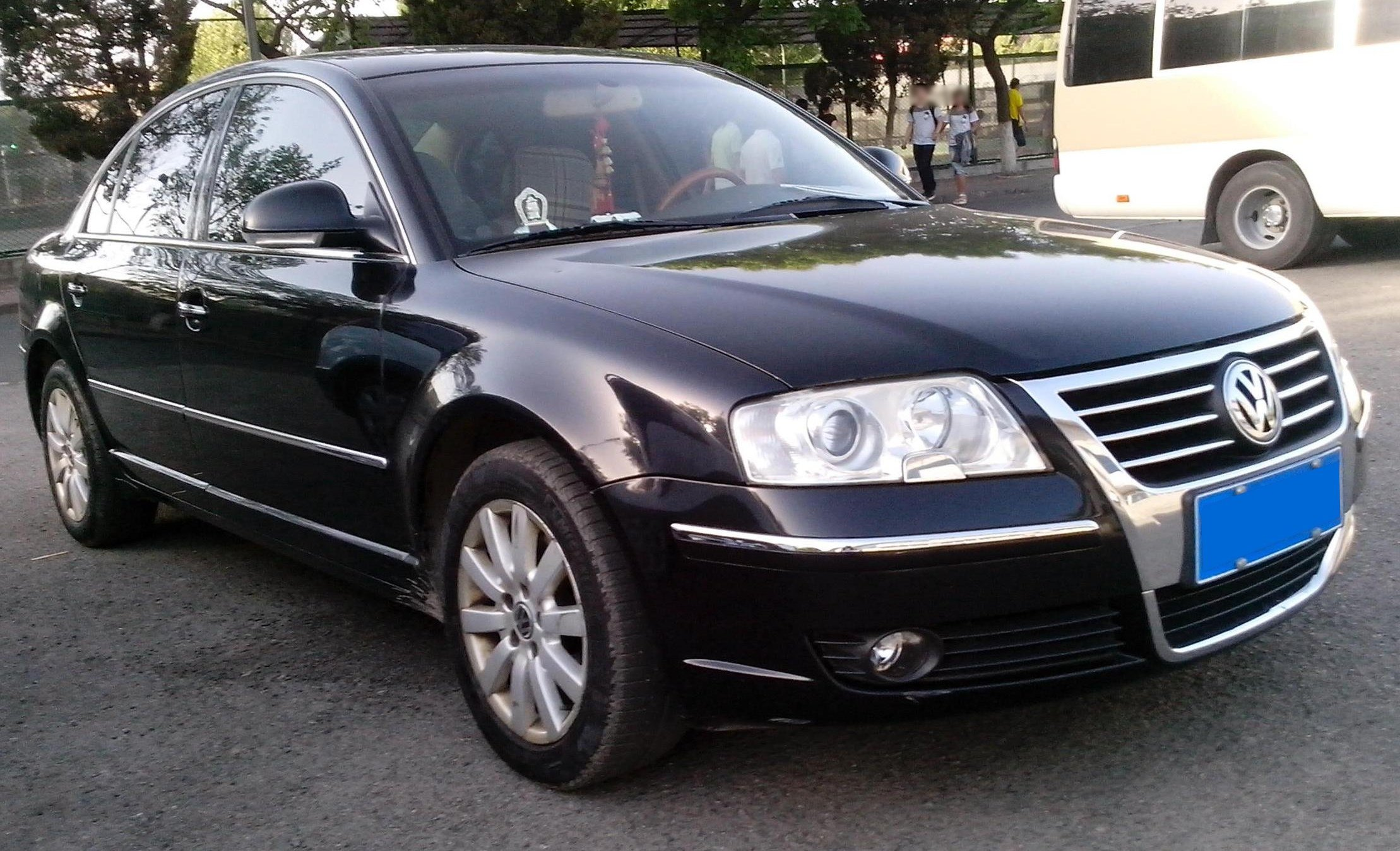
2005–2009
大众Passat领驭
Volkswagen Passat Lingyu

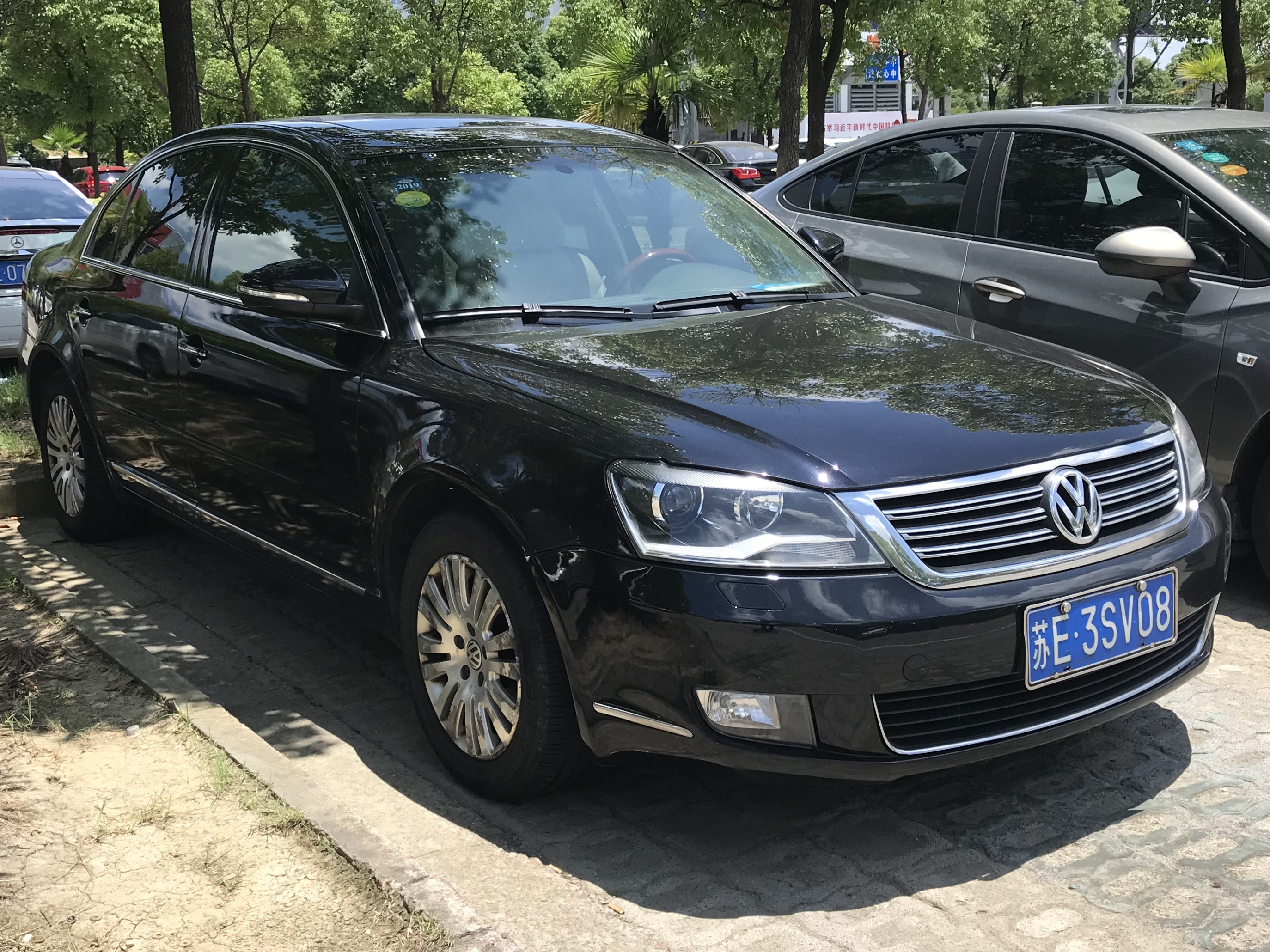
2009–2011
大众帕萨特新领驭
Volkswagen Passat New Lingyu

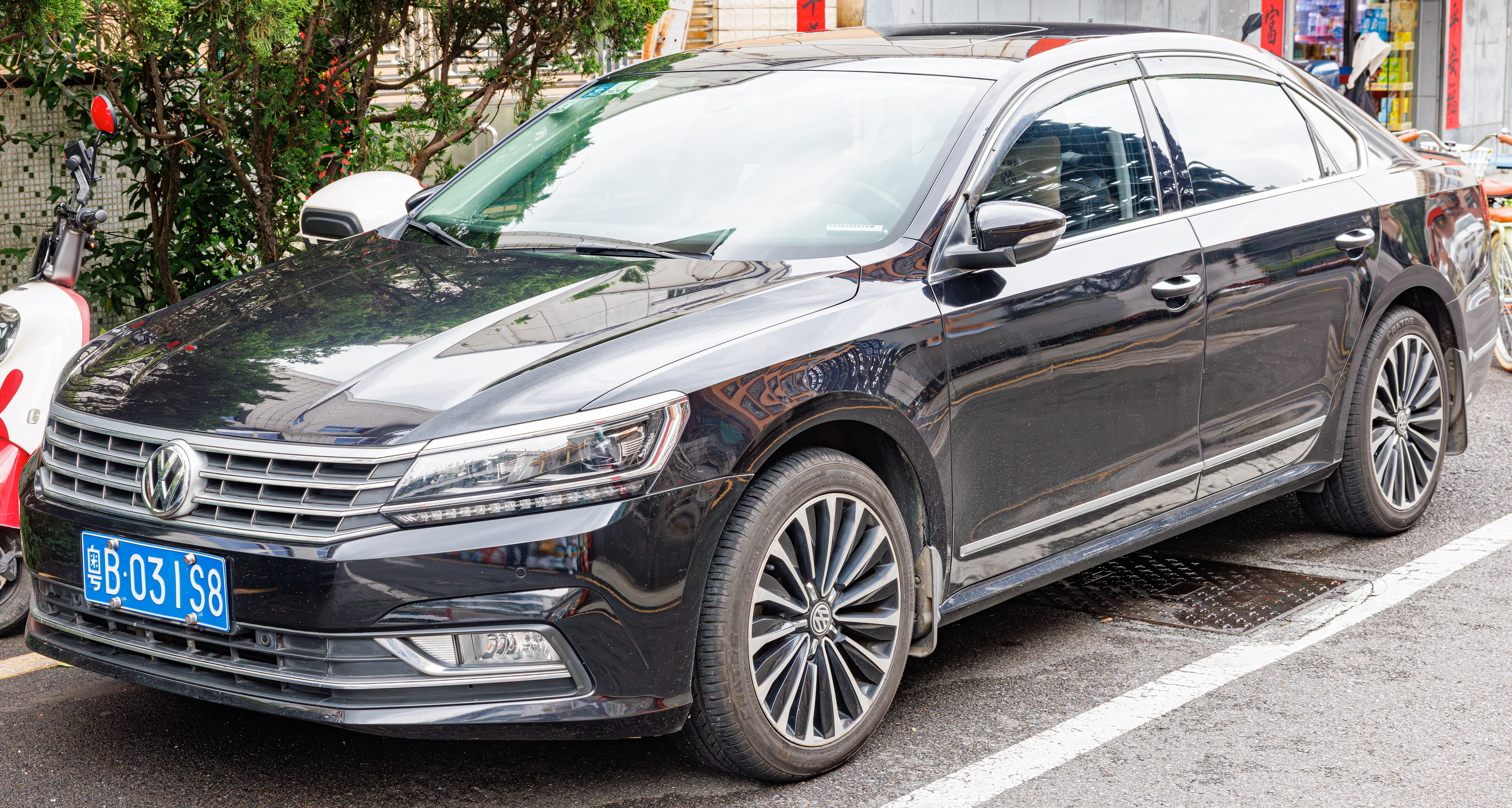
2011–2019
大众新帕萨特
Volkswagen Passat NMS

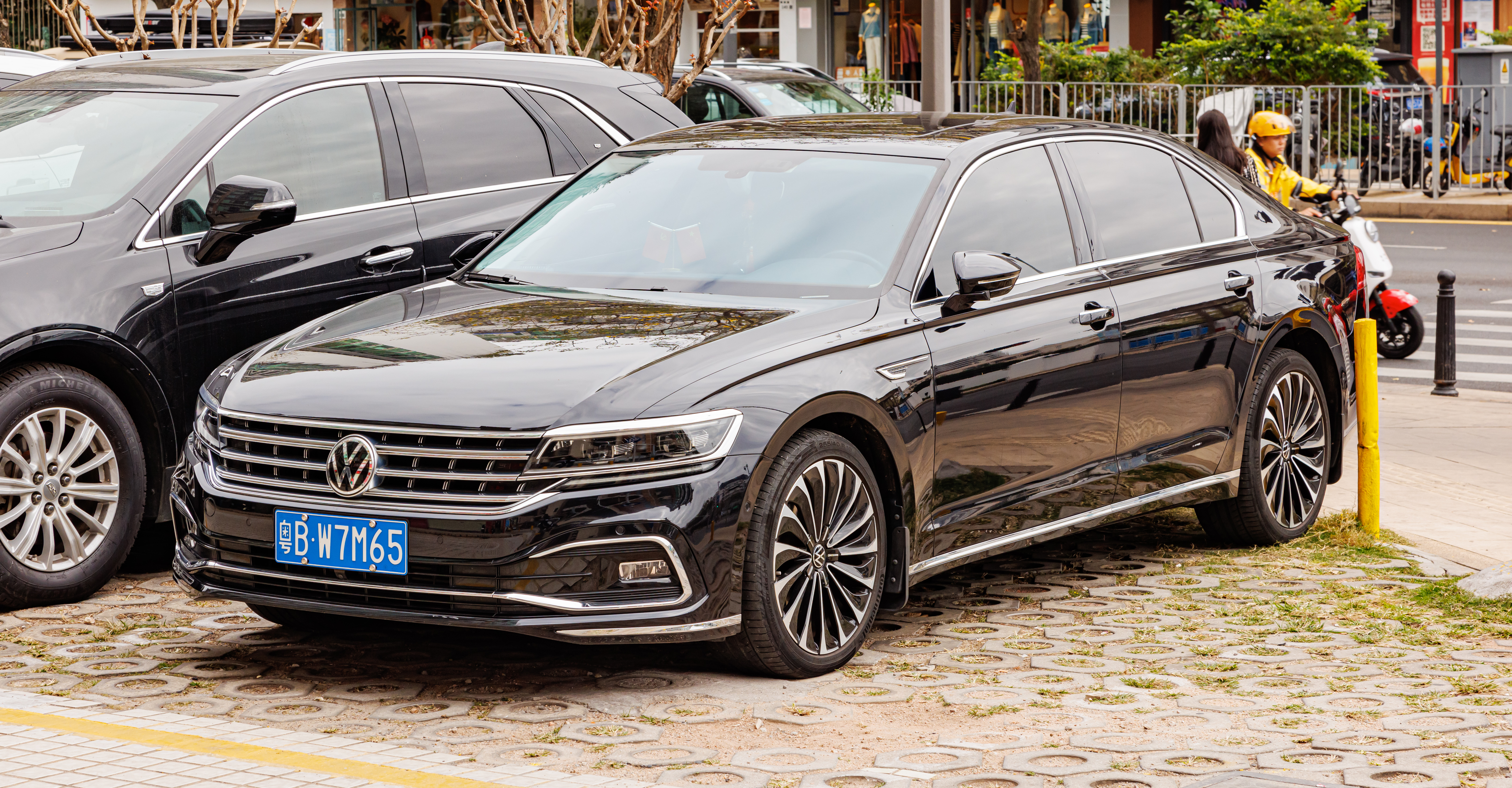
2016–2023
大众輝昂
Volkswagen Phideon

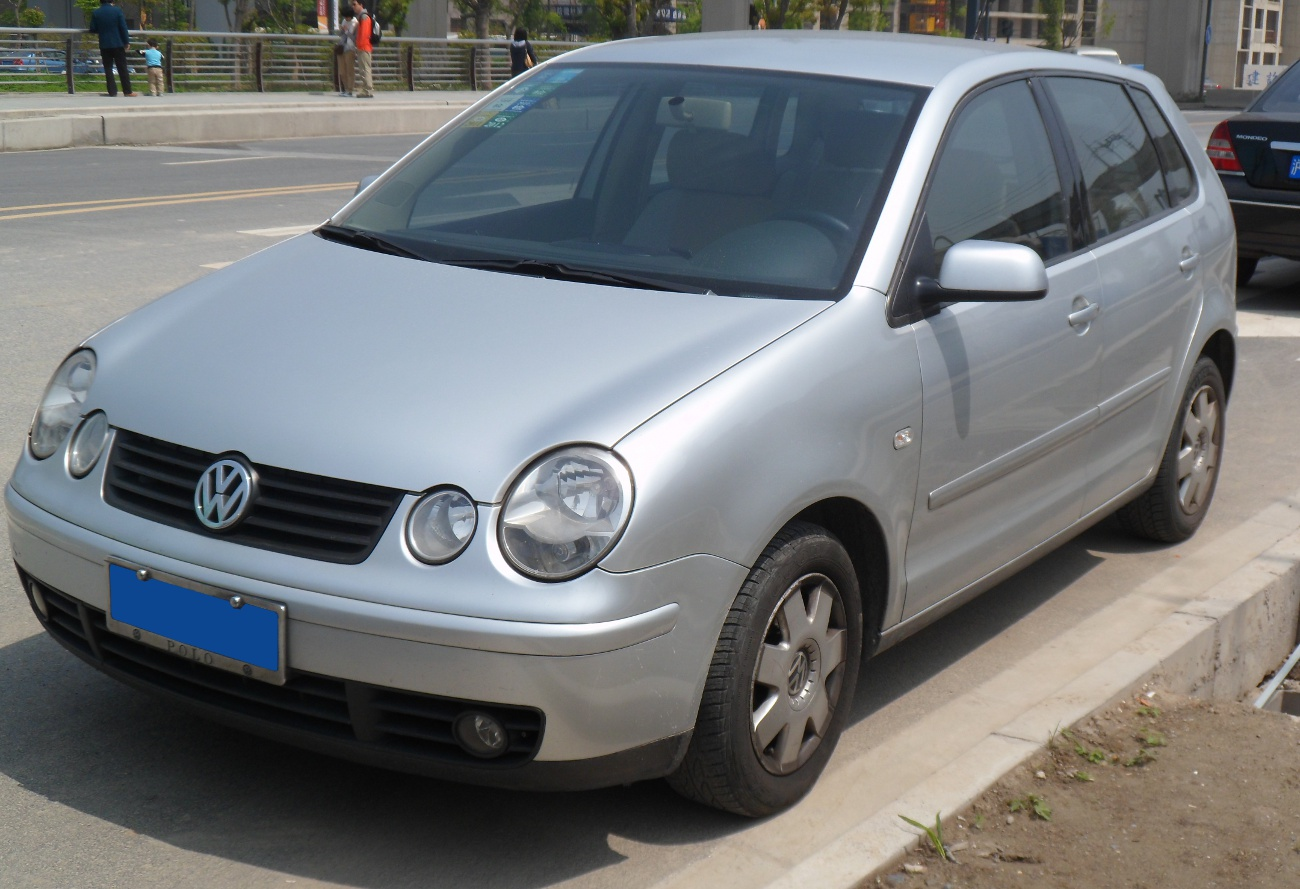
2000–2005
大众Polo Mk4
Volkswagen Polo Mk4

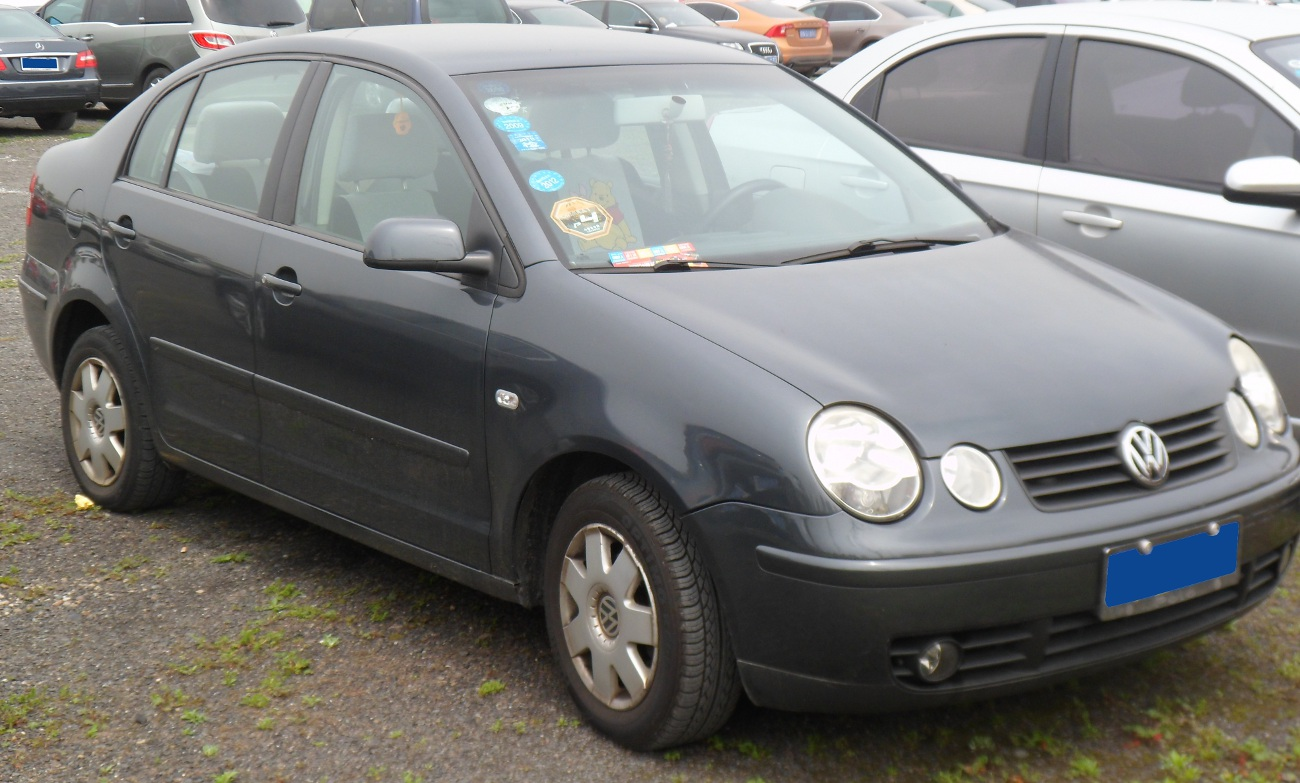
2000–2005
大众Polo Mk4三厢版
Volkswagen Polo Mk4 sedan

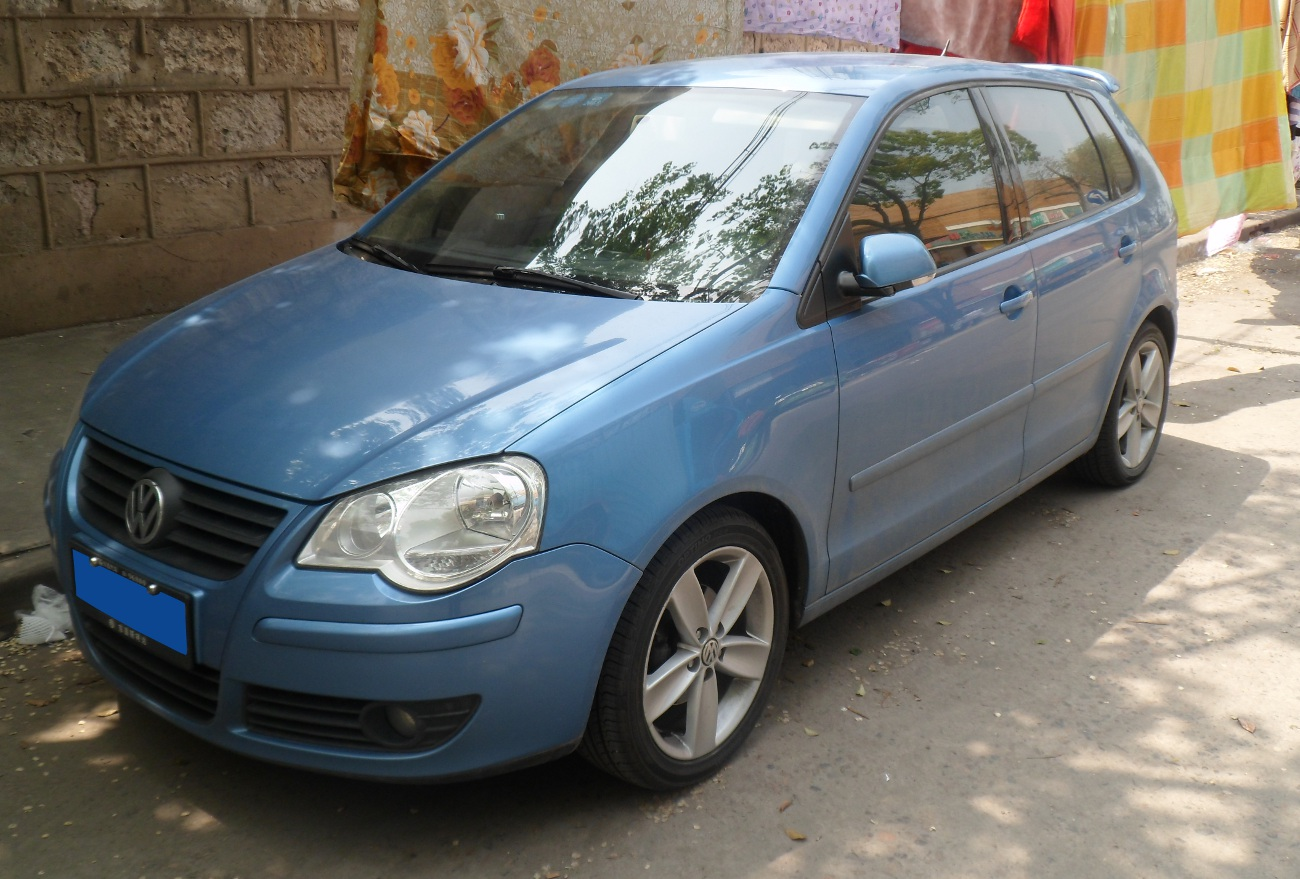
2006–2010
大众Polo劲情
Volkswagen Polo Jinqing

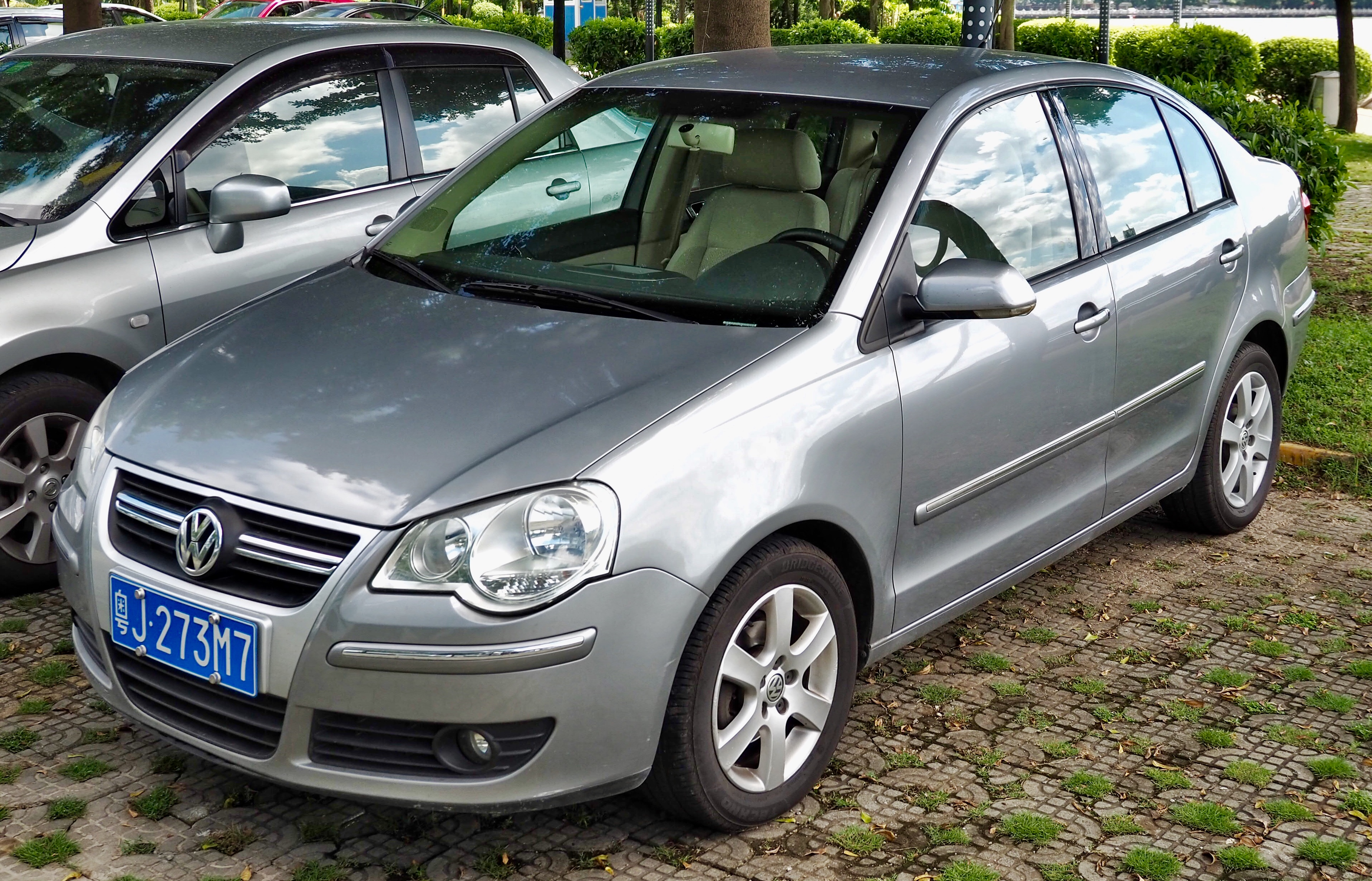
2006–2010
大众Polo劲取
Volkswagen Polo Jinqu

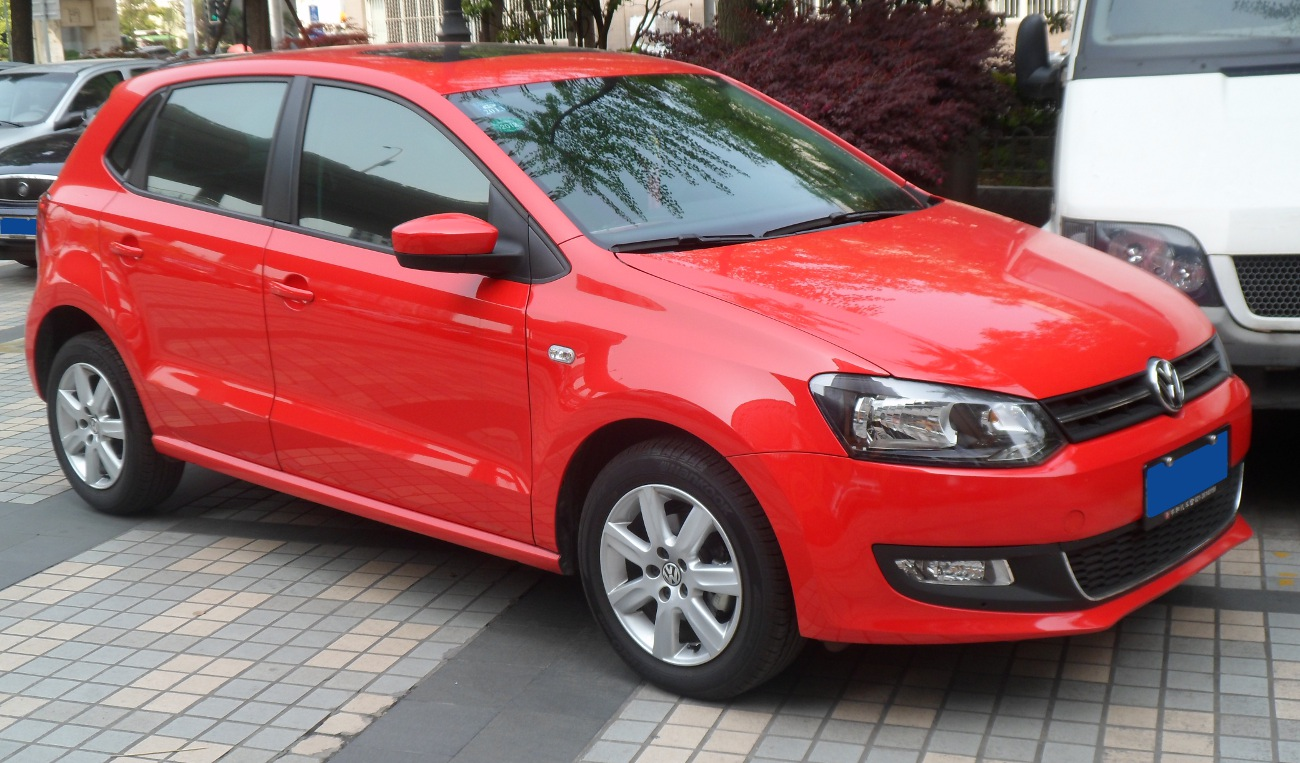
2010–2019
大众Polo Mk5
Volkswagen Polo Mk5

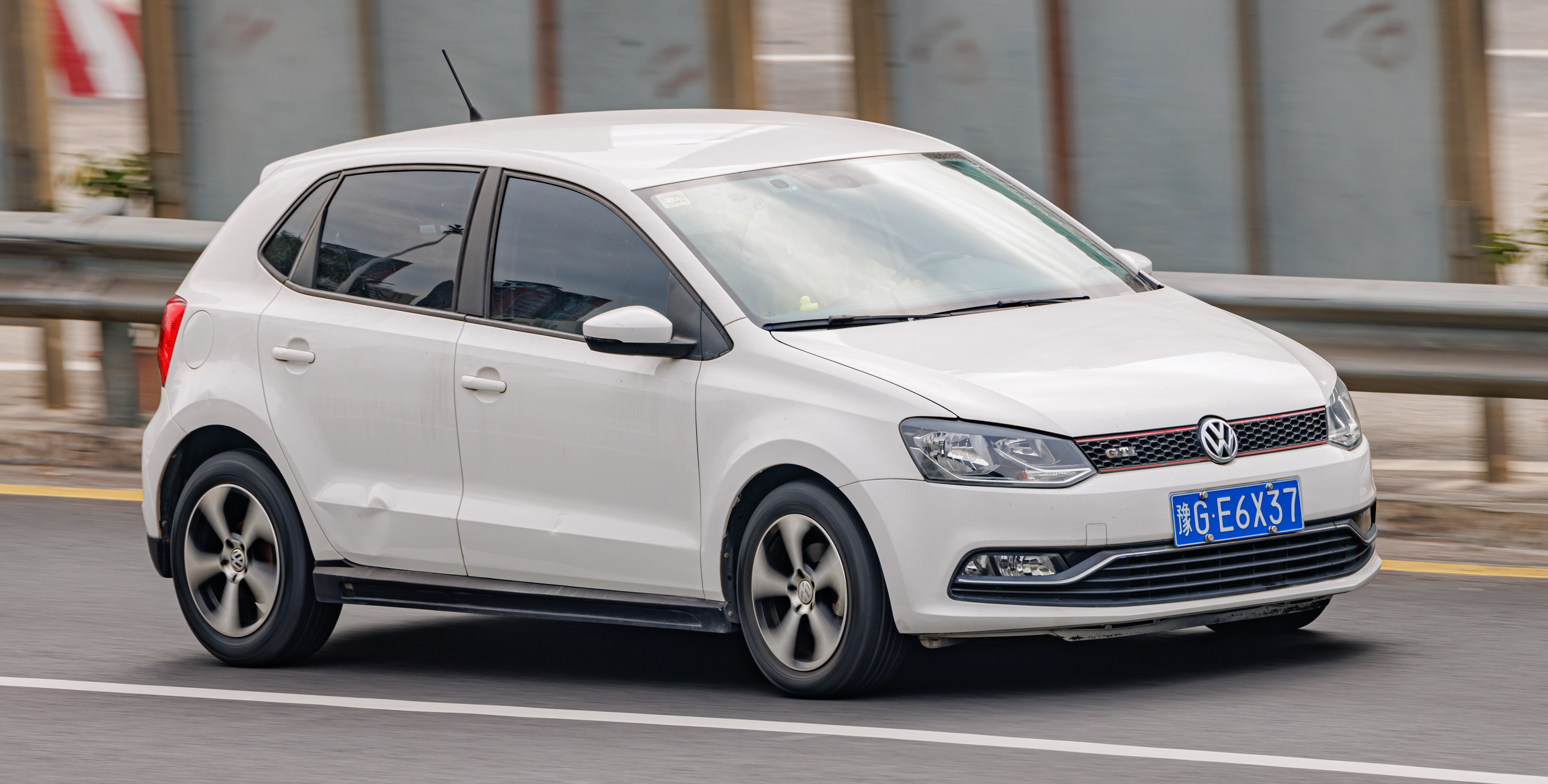
2010–2019
大众Polo GTI
Volkswagen Polo GTI

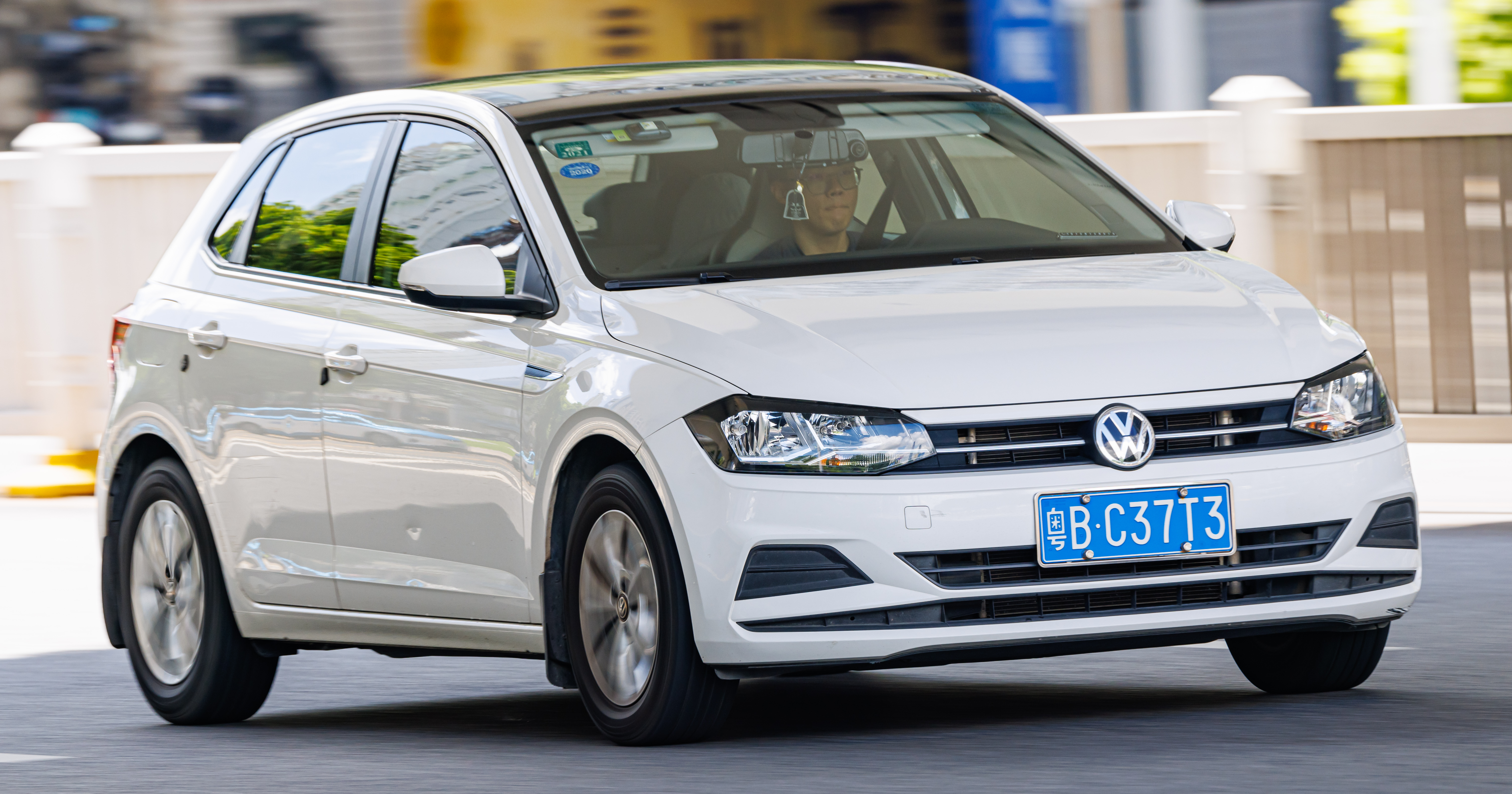
2019–2026
大众Polo MK6
Volkswagen Polo Mk6

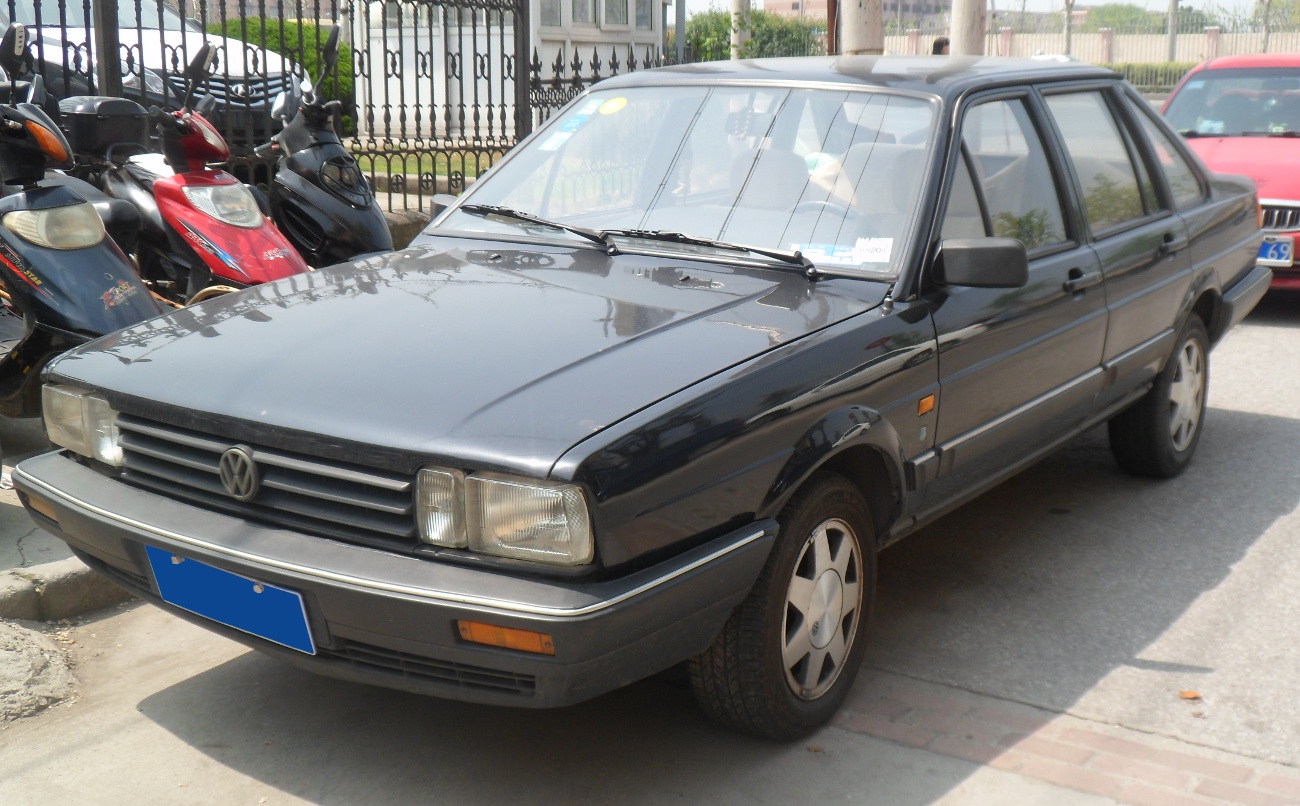
1983–2013
大众桑塔纳
Volkswagen Santana

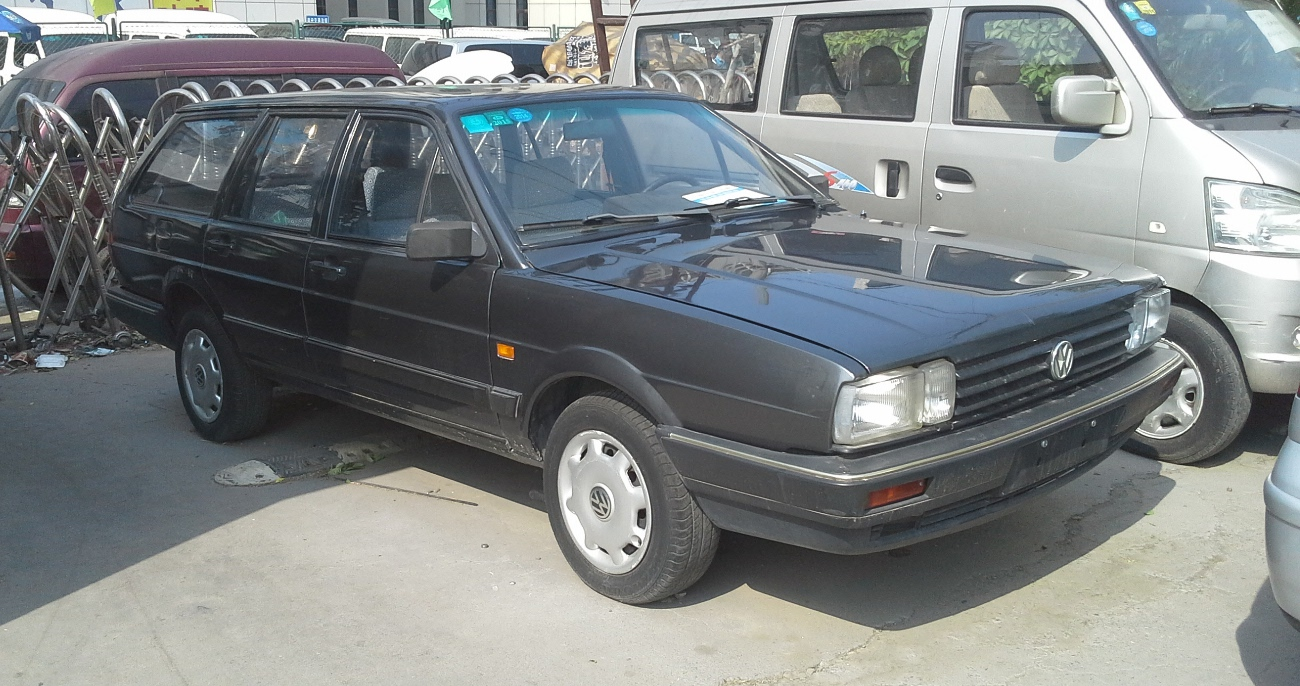
1992–2008
大众桑塔纳旅行车
Volkswagen Santana Variant

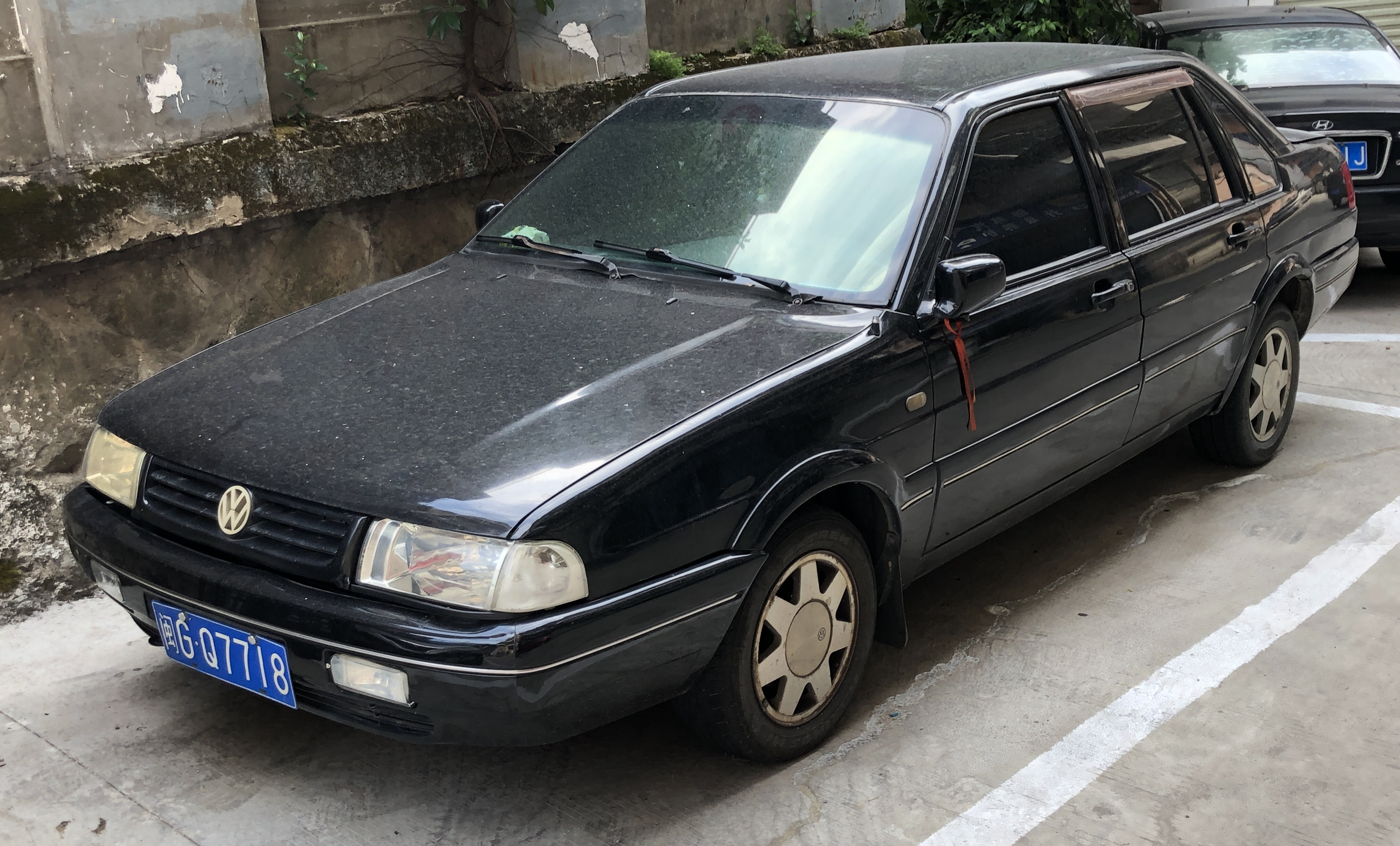
1995–2004
大众桑塔纳2000
Volkswagen Santana 2000

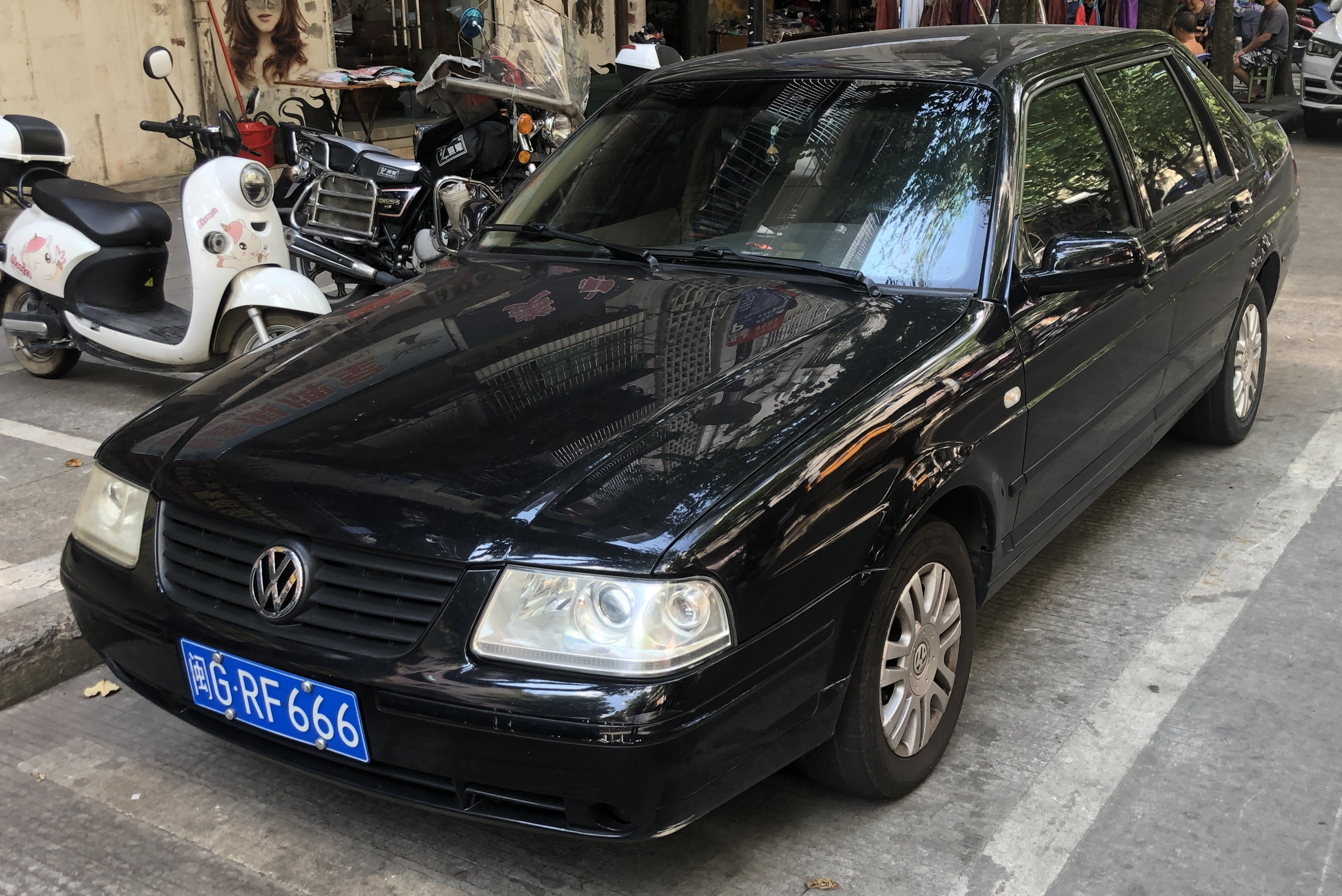
2004–2008
大众桑塔纳3000
Volkswagen Santana 3000

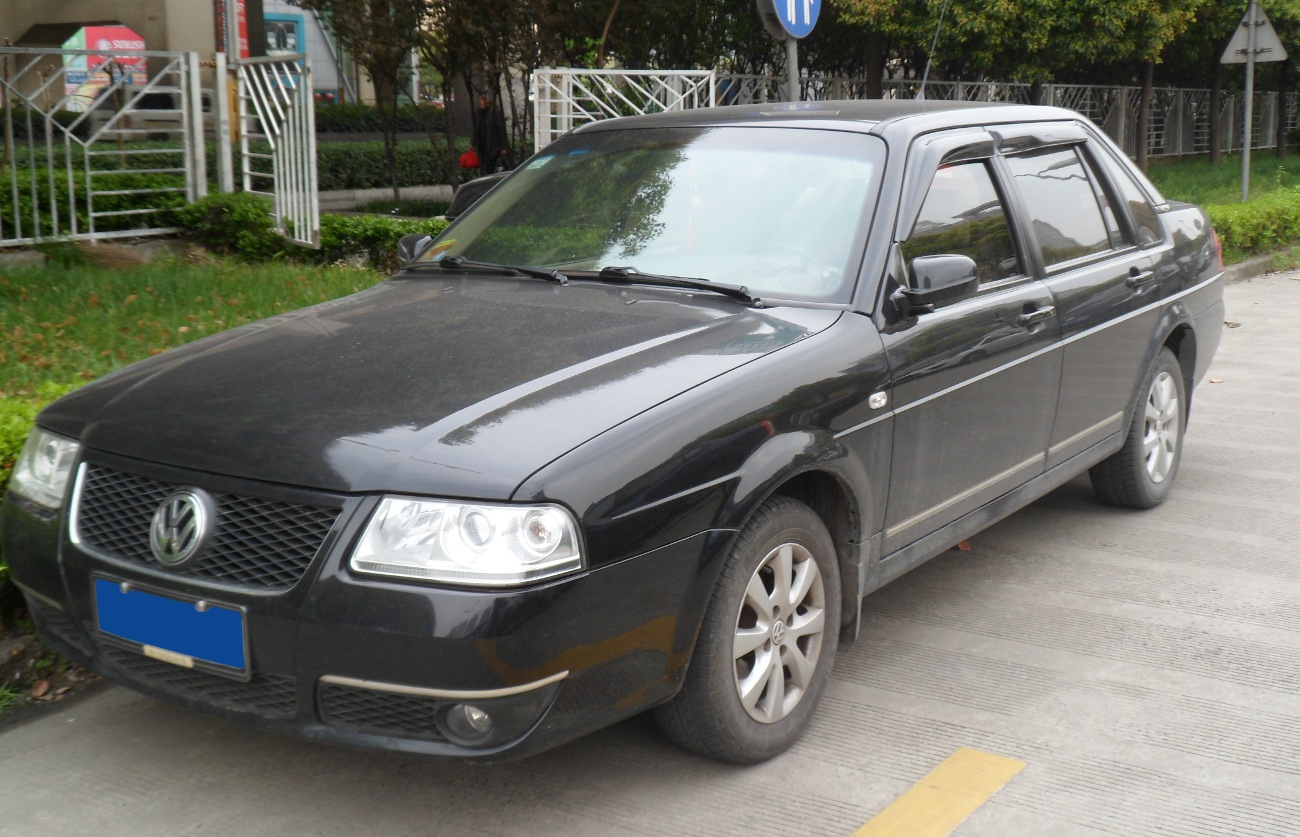
2008–2014
大众桑塔纳志俊/畅达
Volkswagen Santana Vista/Changda

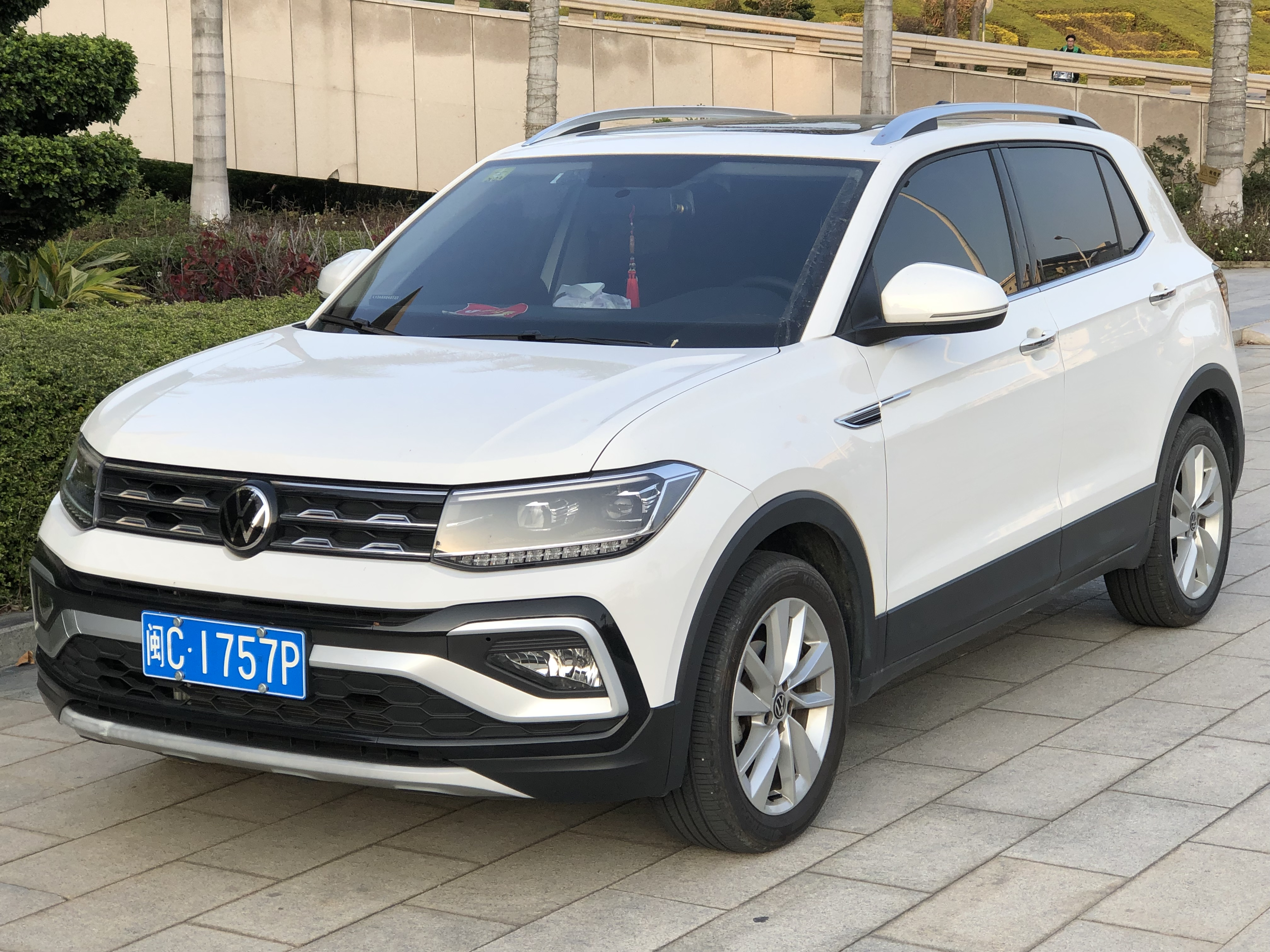
2019–2026
大众途铠
Volkswagen T-Cross

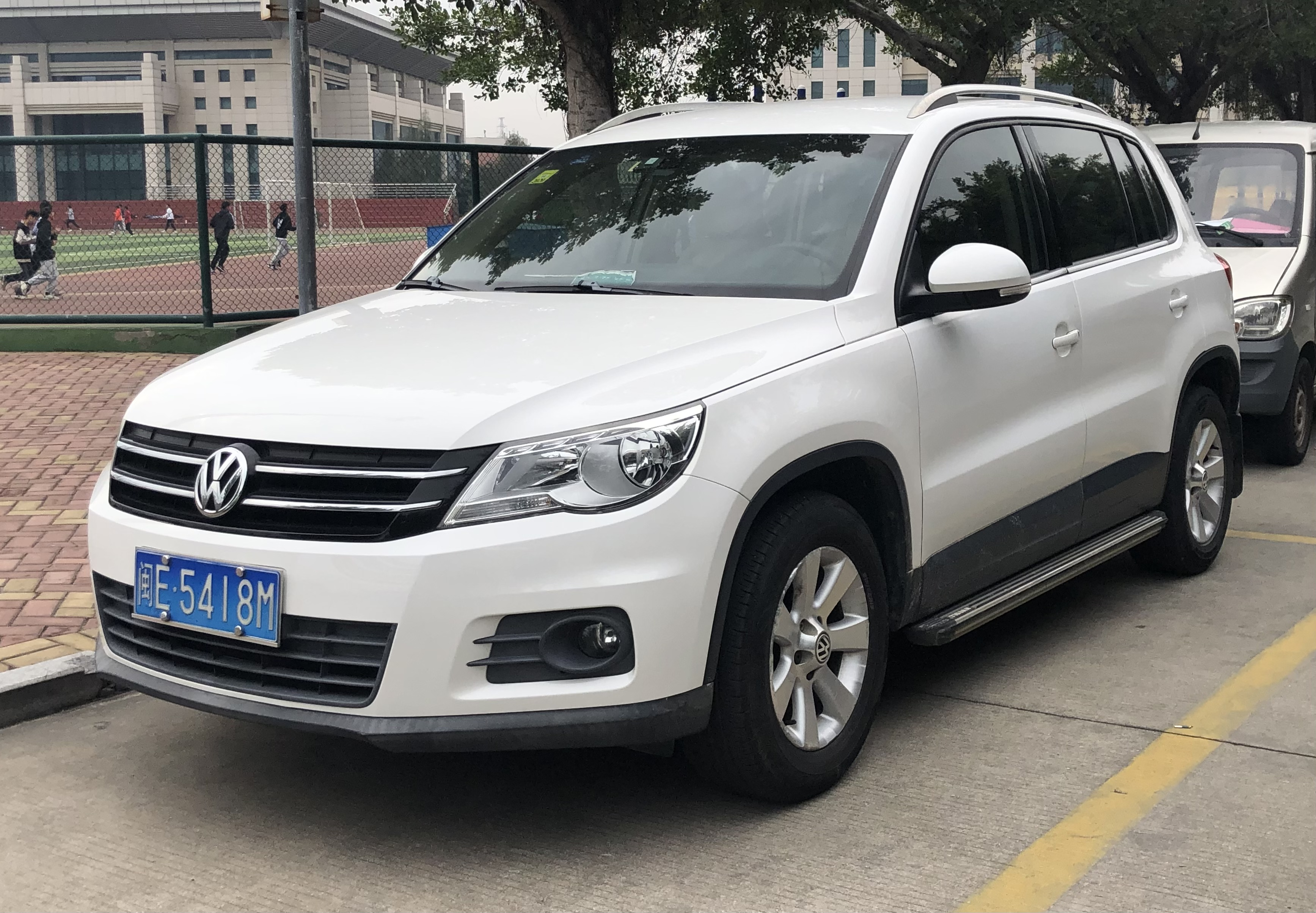
2009–2020
大众途观
Volkswagen Tiguan I

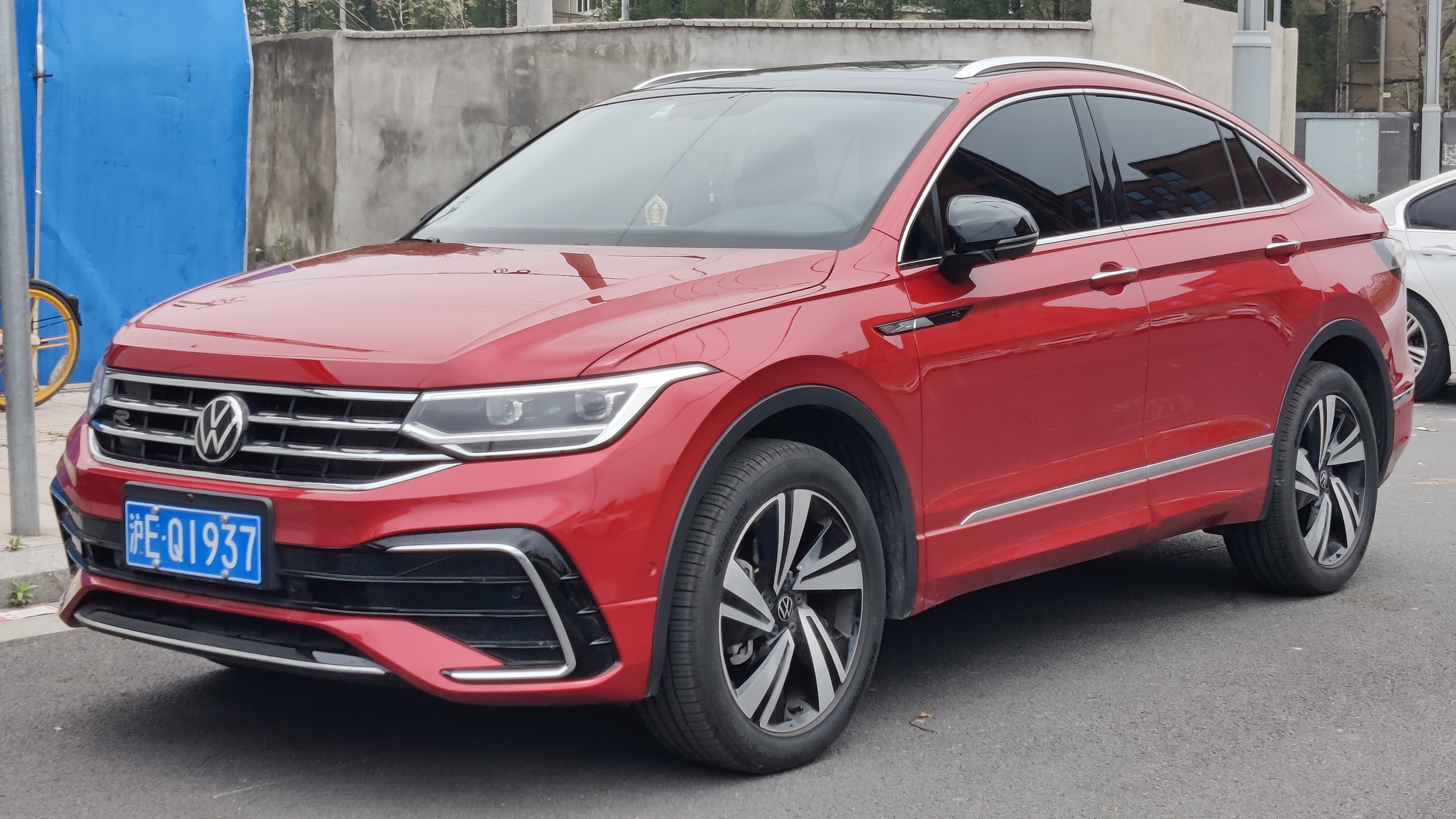
2020–2026
大众途观X
Volkswagen Tiguan X

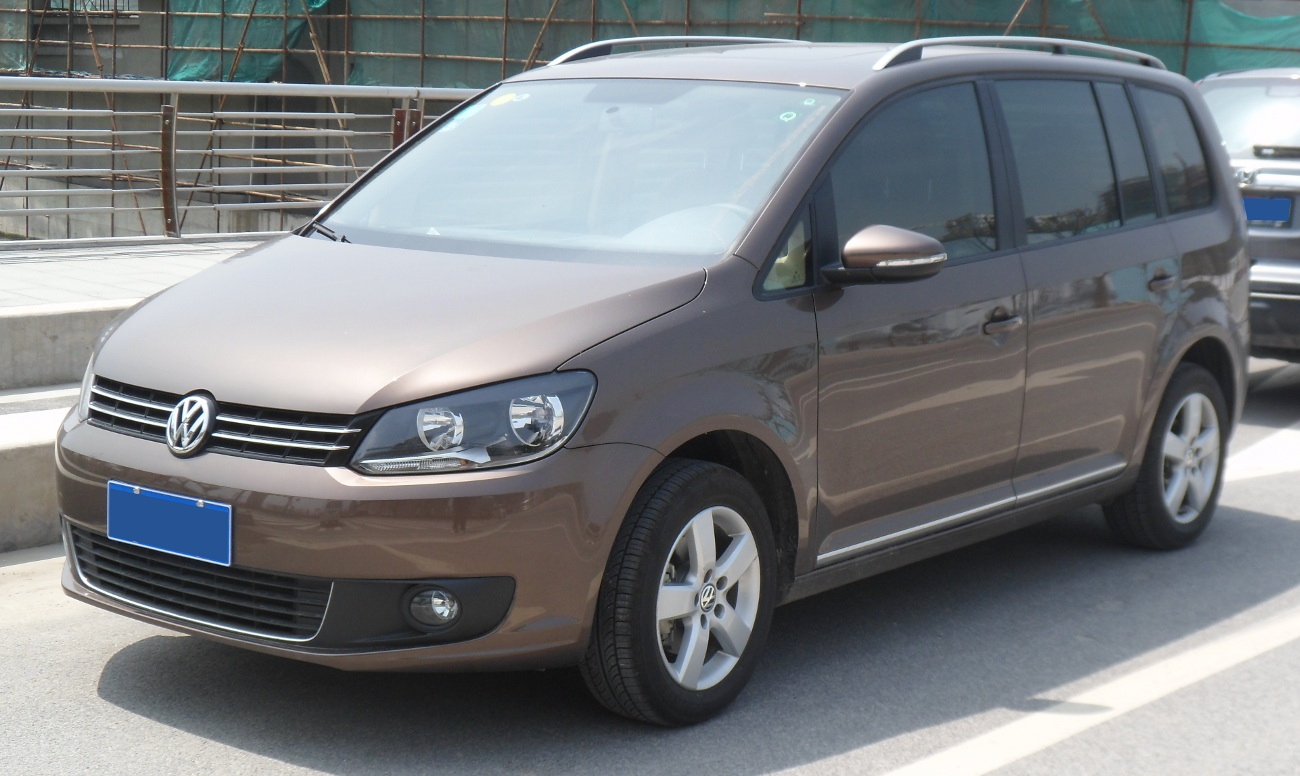
2004–2015
大众途安
Volkswagen Touran I

== Concept cars ==
Name	Reveal	Production		Notes
Name	Reveal	Model	Reveal	Notes
AUDI E	Auto Guangzhou 2024	AUDI E5	Auto Shanghai 2025	Deliveries Summer 2025
AUDI E SUV	Auto Guangzhou 2025	AUDI E7X	Auto China 2026	
Volkswagen ID. Era	Auto Shanghai 2025	VW ID. Era 9X	—	EREV, deliveries expected Q1 2026
Audi A6 e-tron concept	Auto Shanghai 2021	Audi A6L e-tron	Auto Shanghai 2025	
Audi AI:ME	Auto Shanghai 2021	—	—	
Volkswagen ID.Crozz	Auto Shanghai 2017	VW ID.4 X		
Skoda Vision E	Auto Shanghai 2017	Skoda Enyaq		Not sold in China

== Sales ==
Calendar year	Total sales
1985	1,684
1986	8,471
1987	11,038
1988	15,542
1989	15,581
1990	18,523
1991	33,587
1992	65,952
1993	100,030
1994	115,295
1995	159,765
1996	200,031
1997	230,186
1998	235,020
1999	230,699
2000	222,216
2001	230,050
2002	301,712
2003	396,023
2004	355,006
2005	250,006
2006	349,088
2007	456,424
2008	490,087
2009	728,239
2010	1.0 million^{b}
2011	1.16 million^{b}
2012	1.28 million
2013	1.53 million
2014	1.73 million
2015	1.81 million
2016	2.0 million
2017	2.06 million
2018	2.06 million
2019	2.0 million
2020	1.5 million
2021	1.24 million
2022	1.32 million
2023	1.21 million
2024	1.15 million

Notes:

^{a}Sales to dealers

^{b}Deliveries to customers

== See also ==
- Volkswagen Group China
- FAW-Volkswagen
- Volkswagen Anhui
- SAIC Motor
- SAIC-GM
