= LS6 =

LS6 or LS-6 may refer to:

- Rolladen-Schneider LS6, glider (1983–2003)
- GM 2500 engine LS6, straight-4 engine (1978–1979)
- GM LS engine LS6, V8 engine (2000s)
- Chevrolet Big-Block engine LS-6 (454in^{3}), V8 engine (1970s)
- LS-6, a series of Chinese satellite-guided glide bomb.
- The Headingley and Hyde Park postcode area of Leeds
- LS6 (novel), by Mario Crespo
- IM LS6, Chinese car model
