= IM LS8 =

Full-size luxury SUV

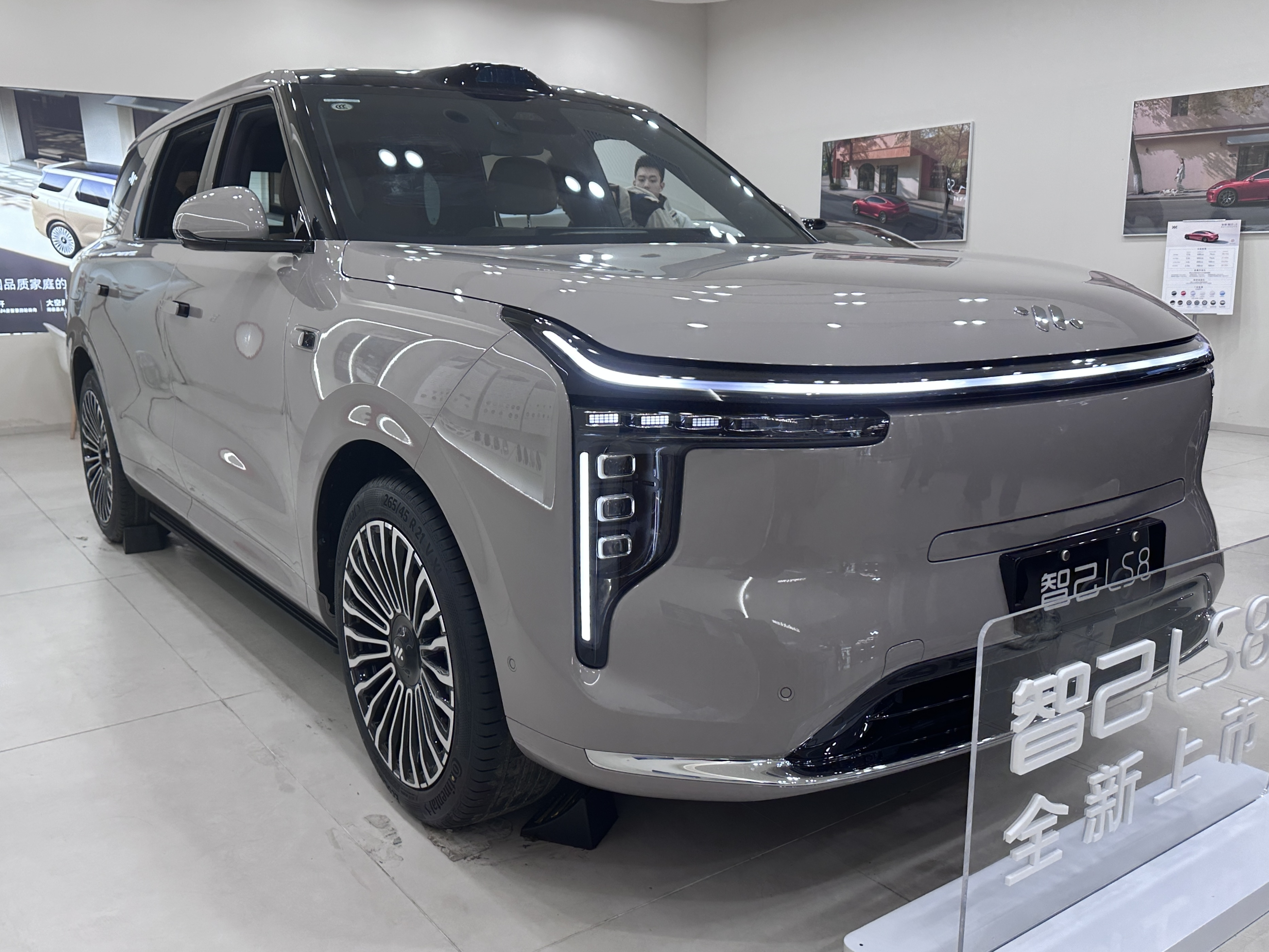

Overview
- Manufacturer: IM Motors
- Model code: S32L
- Also called: MG IM8 (Australia)
- Production: 2026–present
- Assembly: China: Shanghai

Body and chassis
- Class: Full-size luxury SUV (E)
- Body style: 5-door SUV
- Layout: EV; Rear-motor, rear-wheel-drive; EREV; Front-engine Rear-motor, rear-wheel-drive
- Chassis: Unibody
- Related: IM LS9; Volkswagen ID. Era 9X

Powertrain
- Engine: Petrol range extender: 1.5 L 15FNE turbo I4
- Electric motor: PMSM
- Hybrid drivetrain: Series hybrid
- Battery: 52.1 kWh LFP Zenergy; 65.9 kWh NMC CATL; 93.1 kWh LFP CATL; 103.3 kWh NMC CATL
- Range: 1,573–1,605 km (977–997 mi) (EREV, CLTC)
- Electric range: 684–752 km (425–467 mi) (EV, CLTC); 279–335 km (173–208 mi) (EREV, WLTP); 355–430 km (221–267 mi) (EREV, CLTC)

Dimensions
- Wheelbase: 3,060 mm (120.5 in)
- Length: 5,085 mm (200.2 in)
- Width: 2,000 mm (78.7 in)
- Height: 1,807 mm (71.1 in)

The IM LS8 (Chinese: 智己LS8; pinyin: Zhìjǐ LS8) is a battery electric and range-extended full-size luxury SUV produced by SAIC Motor under the IM Motors brand.

== Overview ==
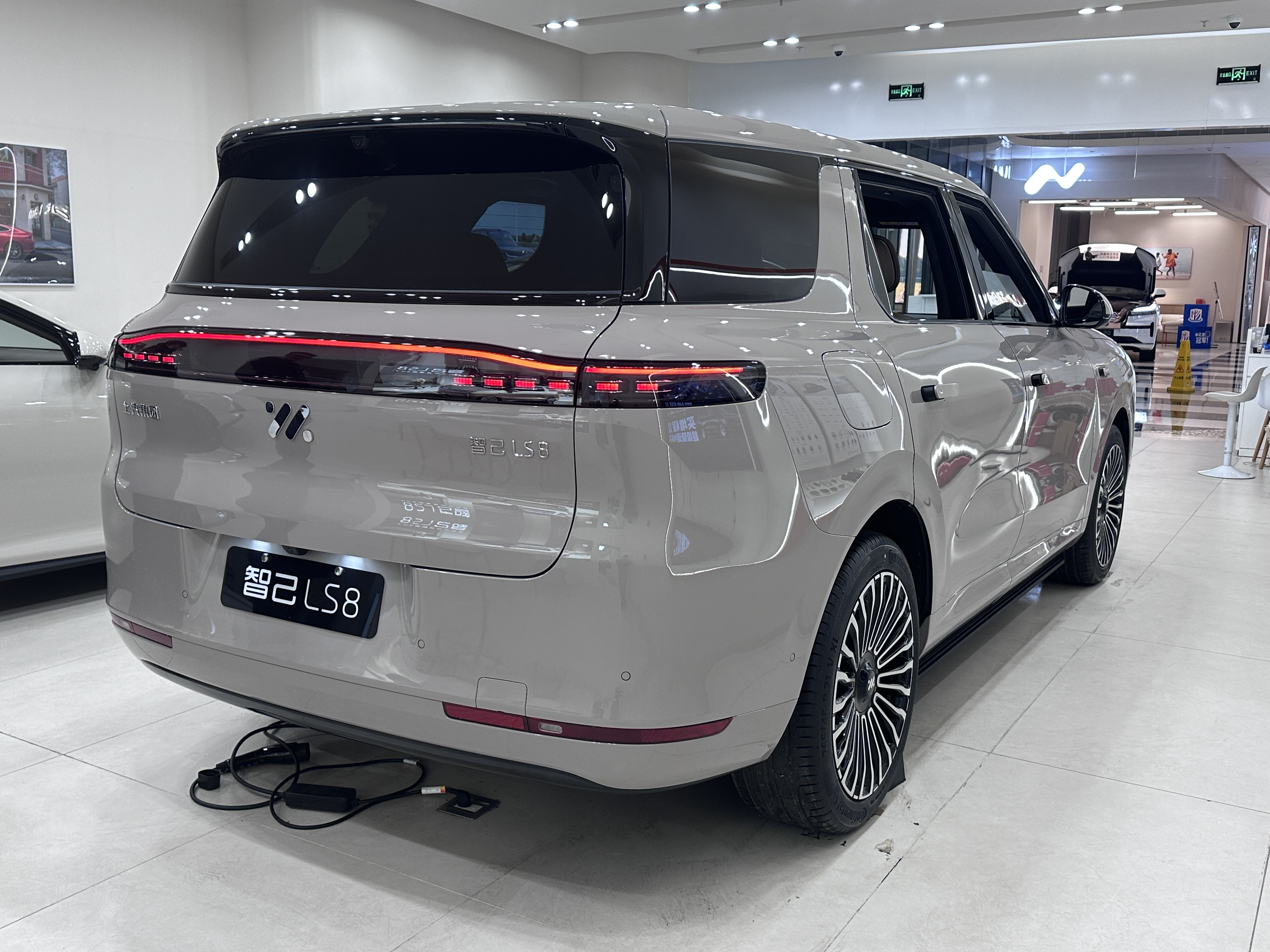
Rear view

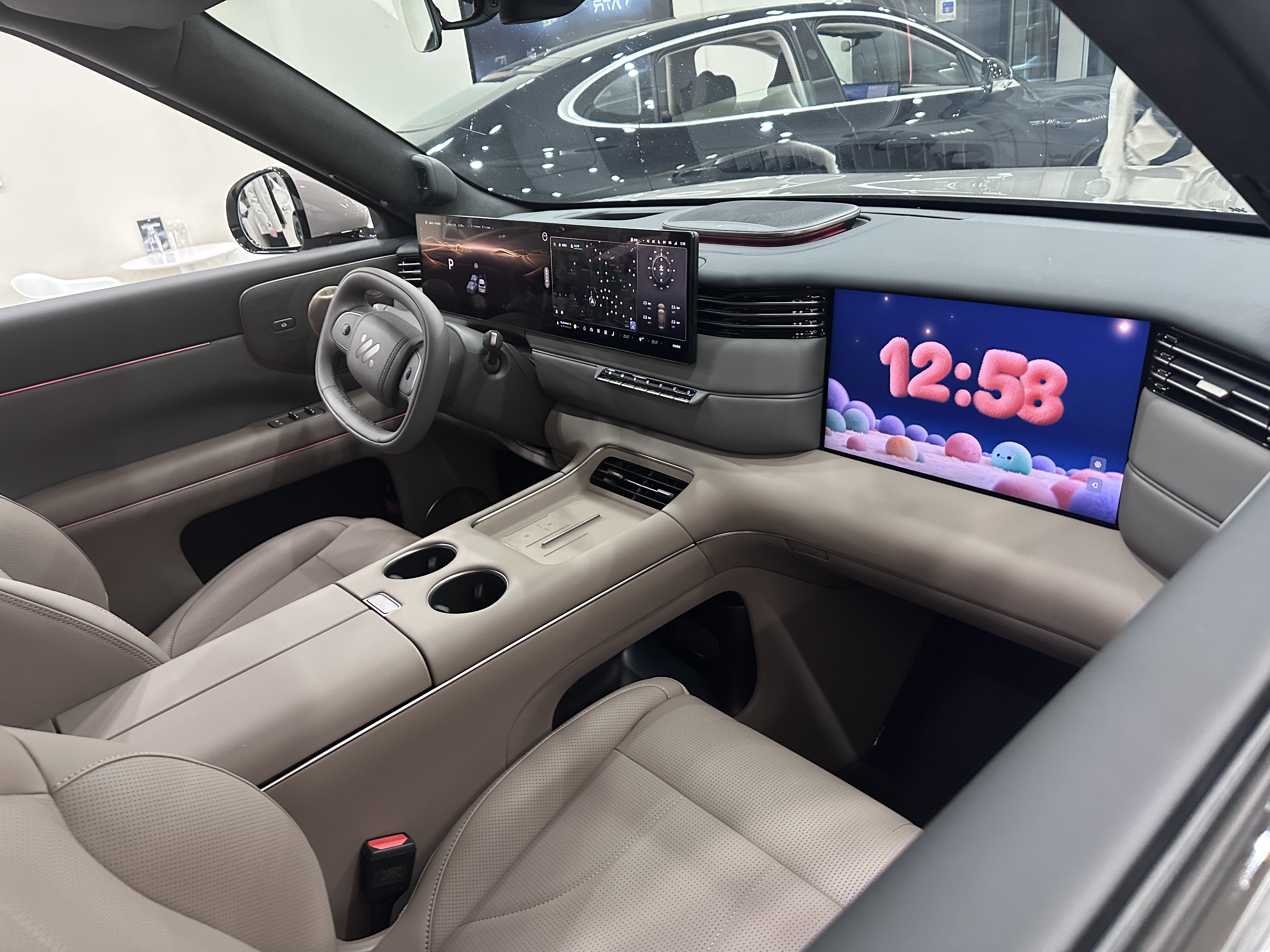
Interior

The LS8 was revealed through MIIT filings on 9 December 2025. It is set to use IM extended-range hybrid system also used in the LS6 and LS9. Its exterior also adopts traits from those vehicles, such as the T-shaped headlights and the raised rear light bar. The LS8 is a car, with a design featuring an elegant style and spacious interiors.

Sales of the LS8 began on 16 April 2026. Pre-sales for the battery electric version opened on 29 October 2026, and went on sale on 5 November 2026.

The LS8 has double wishbone front and multilink independent rear suspension geometries, and is equipped with single-chamber air suspension. It comes standard with ±24° of rear-wheel steering for a turning radius of 4.85 metres (15.9 ft), and has optional full-vehicle steer-by-wire system (standard on electric models).

The exterior is available in Olympus Black, Pamir Grey, Bled Green, Chogori Silver, and Alps White.

The interior features a 27.1-inch 5K-resolution MiniLED display which serves as the digital instrument cluster and central infotainment touchscreen, and is supplemented with an inset 15.6-inch 3K-resolution passenger entertainment display and a 21.5-inch 4K-resolution ceiling-mounted rear passenger entertainment screen, all powered by a Qualcomm Snapdragon 8295P chip. It comes with a standard 18-speaker 7.1.4 surround sound Bang & Olufsen audio system, which can be upgraded to a 25-speaker Bang & Olufsen sound system. It has a 12.3 L (0.43 cu ft) refrigerator-heated compartment with a temperature range of −6–50 °C (21–122 °F) and a 9.2-litre (0.32 cu ft) underseat drawer in the second row. It has an optional heated floor feature. The two-row model has a rear cargo capacity of 938 L (33.1 cu ft) which expands to 2,576 L (91.0 cu ft) with the rear seats folded, while three-row variants have 250 L (8.8 cu ft) expanding to 879 L (31.0 cu ft). Electric models also feature a 168-litre (5.9 cu ft) frunk which can be opened by knocking.

The IM AD ZETA ADAS system codeveloped with Momenta has a sensor suite consisting of one 520-line roof-mounted LiDAR, one mmWave radar, 11 cameras, and 12 ultrasonic sensors. It is powered by an Nvidia Thor-U chip providing 700 TOPS and is capable of supervised autonomous driving in highway and urban conditions.

== Powertrain ==
The electric variant is powered by IM's NEO Hurricane motor, and IM claims that the battery can retain 95% of its capacity in cold weather conditions of −20 °C (−4 °F).

Specifications
Battery		Power	Torque	Electric range		10–80% charge	0–100 km/h (62 mph)	Top speed	Kerb weight
Type	Weight	Power	Torque	WLTP	CLTC	10–80% charge	0–100 km/h (62 mph)	Top speed	Kerb weight
EREV
52.1kWh LFP Zenergy	379 kg (836 lb)	309 hp (230 kW; 313 PS)	430 N⋅m (317 lb⋅ft)	279 km (173 mi)	355 km (221 mi)	19 min	7.3 sec	190 km/h (118 mph)	2,540 kg (5,600 lb)
65.9kWh NMC CATL	375 kg (827 lb)	523 hp (390 kW; 530 PS)	670 N⋅m (494 lb⋅ft)	335 km (208 mi)	430 km (267 mi)	16.5 min	4.7 sec	220 km/h (137 mph)	2,620 kg (5,776 lb)
EV
93.1kWh LFP CATL	612 kg (1,349 lb)	402 hp (300 kW; 408 PS)	500 N⋅m (369 lb⋅ft)	—	684 km (425 mi)	20 min	6.7 sec	200 km/h (124 mph)	2,520 kg (5,556 lb)
103.3kWh NMC CATL	552 kg (1,217 lb)	402 hp (300 kW; 408 PS)	500 N⋅m (369 lb⋅ft)	—	752 km (467 mi)	17 min	6.6 sec	200 km/h (124 mph)	2,460 kg (5,423 lb)
