= LS7 =

LS7 may refer to:

== Vehicles ==
- General Motors LS7, a small-block V8 gasoline engine
- Rolladen-Schneider LS7, a 1988–1993 German high-performance single-seat sailplane
- IM LS7, a battery electric mid-size crossover

== Other uses ==
- CS/LS7, a Chinese submachine gun
