= IM Motors =

Chinese electric vehicle joint venture

Zhiji Automotive Technology Co., Ltd
- Trade name: IM Motors
- Type: Joint venture
- Industry: Automotive
- Founded: December 2020; 5 years ago
- Headquarters: Shanghai, China
- Area served: China
- Key people: Liu Tao (co-CEO)
- Products: Electric vehicles
- Owner: SAIC Motor (54%); Alibaba Group (18%); Zhangjiang Hi-Tech (18%)
- Website: www.immotors.com

IM Motors (Chinese: 智己汽车, Zhiji Motors) is an electric vehicle joint venture between Chinese automobile manufacturer SAIC Motor and Chinese technology companies Alibaba Group and Zhangjiang Hi-Tech.

== Naming ==
The company's English name IM stands for "Intelligence in Motion". Its Chinese name is Zhiji Motors (智己汽车).

== History ==
The IM Motors joint venture between SAIC Motor, Alibaba Group, and Zhangjiang Hi-Tech was established in December 2020, and a 3D rendering of the company's upcoming sedan, aiming to compete with the Tesla Model S, was presented later in January 2021.

In April 2021 at the Auto Shanghai auto show, IM Motors presented three vehicles; the L7 electric executive car prototype, along with two concepts, the LS7 mid-size SUV and the Airo designed by English designer Thomas Heatherwick.

In 2022, Alibaba Group partnered with SAIC Motor Corporation to back IM Motors which is now delivering electric cars under a couple of brands including Ora and Great Wall Motors. IM Motors which is an EV joint venture controlled by China's largest state-owned carmaker SAIC Motor and also owned by e-commerce giant Alibaba. Alibaba and Zhangjiang Hi-tech each hold 18% according to Chinese media reports.

In December 2022, IM Motors officially launched its second production model, the IM LS7, planning to start its sales in the second half of 2023 in the Chinese market only. Meanwhile, the 18% stake held by the administrative authorities of Shanghai's Pudong New District was sold to the private company Zhangjiang Hi-Tech.

In August 2023, the company introduced its third model in the form of the LS6, a smaller "coupe SUV" positioned below the flagship LS7.

In July 2023, Audi announced that it was establishing a strategic cooperation with the Chinese company SAIC Motor in order to borrow its platform used to build large electric cars. Audi expressed its desire to use this technology to build its own electric model specifically for the Chinese market in order to increase its competitiveness against startup companies such as Nio.

In February 2024, IM Motors participated in the Geneva Motor Show and launched its fourth model, the IM L6 sedan. On April 8, 2024, IM L6 was officially launched and pre-sales started. Deliveries of the car started on May 13 The flagship version of the car (Max Lightyear Edition) uses a quasi-900V high performance electrical architecture and ultra-fast charging semi-solid-state electrolyte batteries, with a claimed range of over 1,000 kilometres (620 mi).

On March 1, 2024, IM Motors announced that it had received over RMB 8 billion in Series B equity financing, led by Bank of China Asset Management, a subsidiary of Bank of China, with participation from ABC Investment, Lingang Group, CATL, Momenta, Qingtao Energy and other companies.

In March of 2025, IM Motors and Alibaba launched IM AIOS Smart Cockpit, the industry's first AI-driven car ecosystem, set to roll out in April. The 'no touch', 'no app' cockpit not only includes Alibaba AI technology but also AI agents that run on an open voice model rather than depending upon in-car apps or mini programs. Voice commands can now directly trigger actions, rather than having individual applications run specific features of the car independently. The technology includes an AI Takeout option developed in collaboration with Ele.me and Alibaba, which allows drivers to place food orders so meals are ready when they arrive at the restaurant. IM Motors AI takeout features are part of the AIOS, which was developed by Alibaba's automotive AI arm Banma and Ele.me, the Alibaba food delivery platform. The system uses a no-touch, no-app experience that uses AI agents and natural language rather than separate in-car applications, which are aimed at reducing distraction and combining navigation, entertainment, and daily errands all into one interface.

=== Future plans ===
According to IM Motors' overseas market layout plan, the IM L7 and LS7 will enter the Mexican, Middle Eastern, South American and Southeast Asian markets for sales in 2024; in 2025, LS6 and L6 will enter overseas markets for sales. In many markets, IM Motors' overseas sales network will be independent channels run by selected dealer groups from MG's existing network, while in other markets like Europe, IM brand vehicles will be sold alongside MG at the same locations.

== Models ==
=== Current models ===
- IM L7 (2022–present), full-size sedan, BEV
- IM L6 (2024–present), mid-size sedan, BEV
- IM LS7 (2023–present), mid-size SUV, BEV
- IM LS6 (2023–present), compact SUV, BEV/EREV
- IM LS8 (2026–present), full-size SUV, BEV/EREV
- IM LS9 (2025–present), full-size SUV, EREV
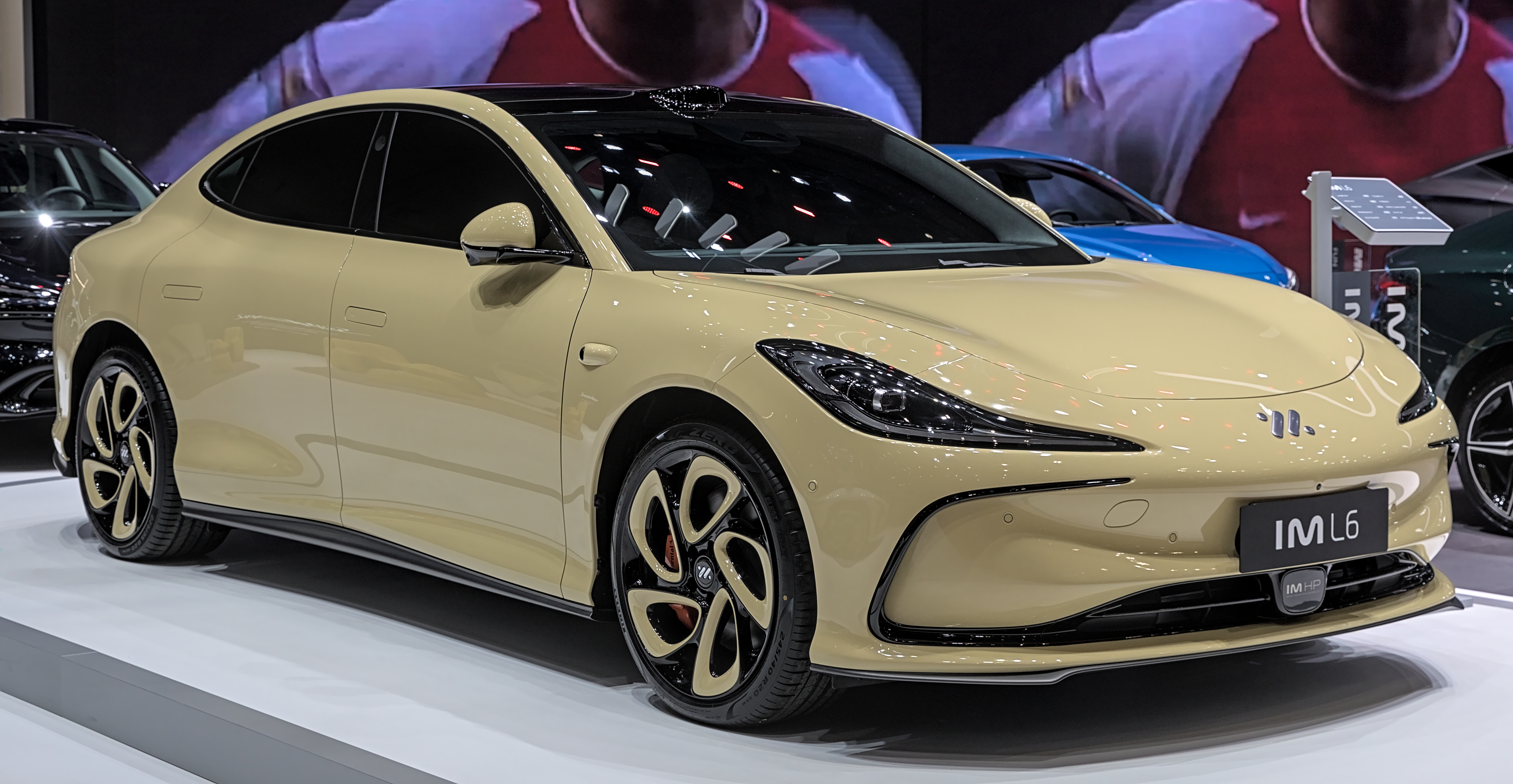
IM L6

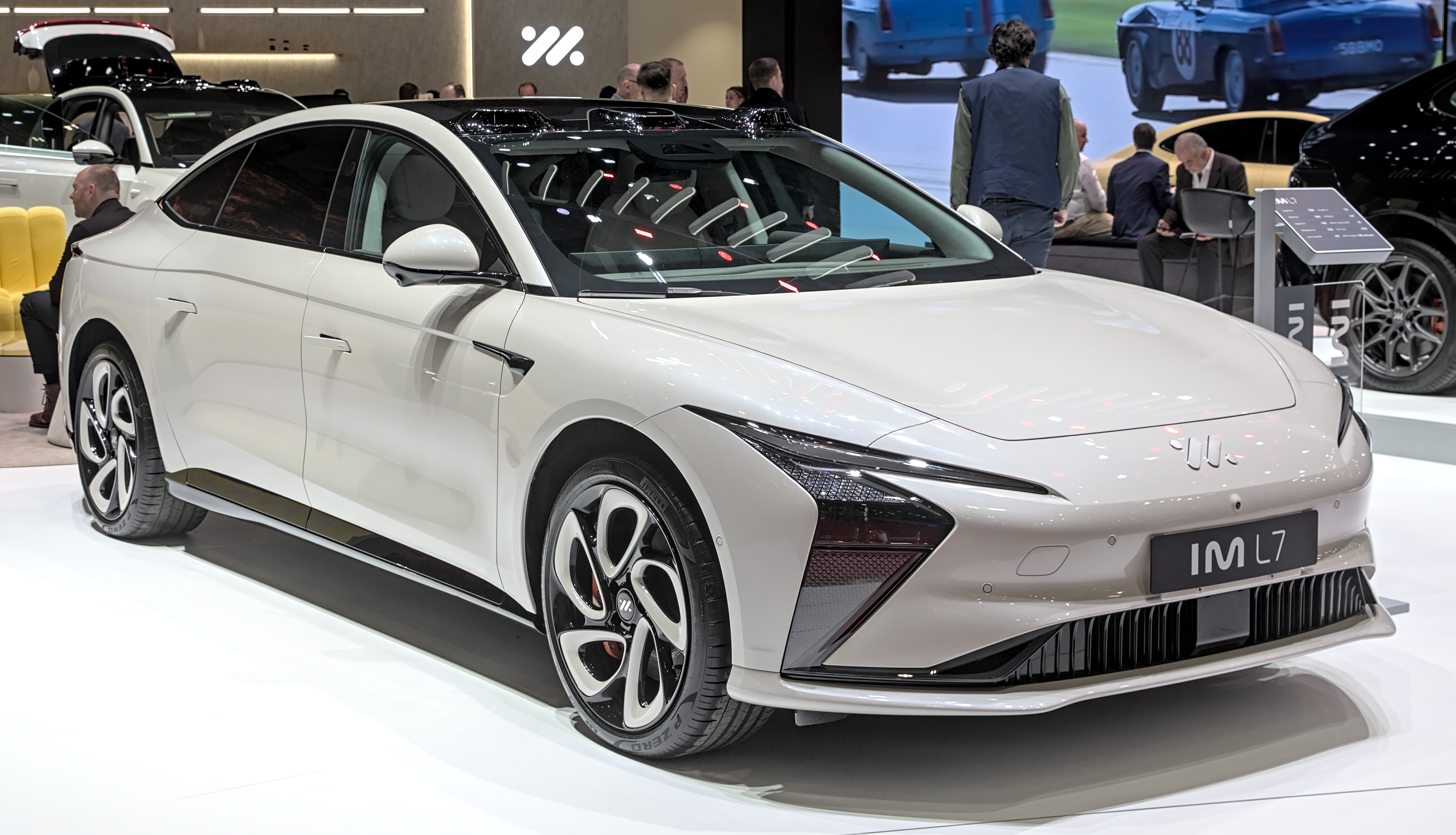
IM L7

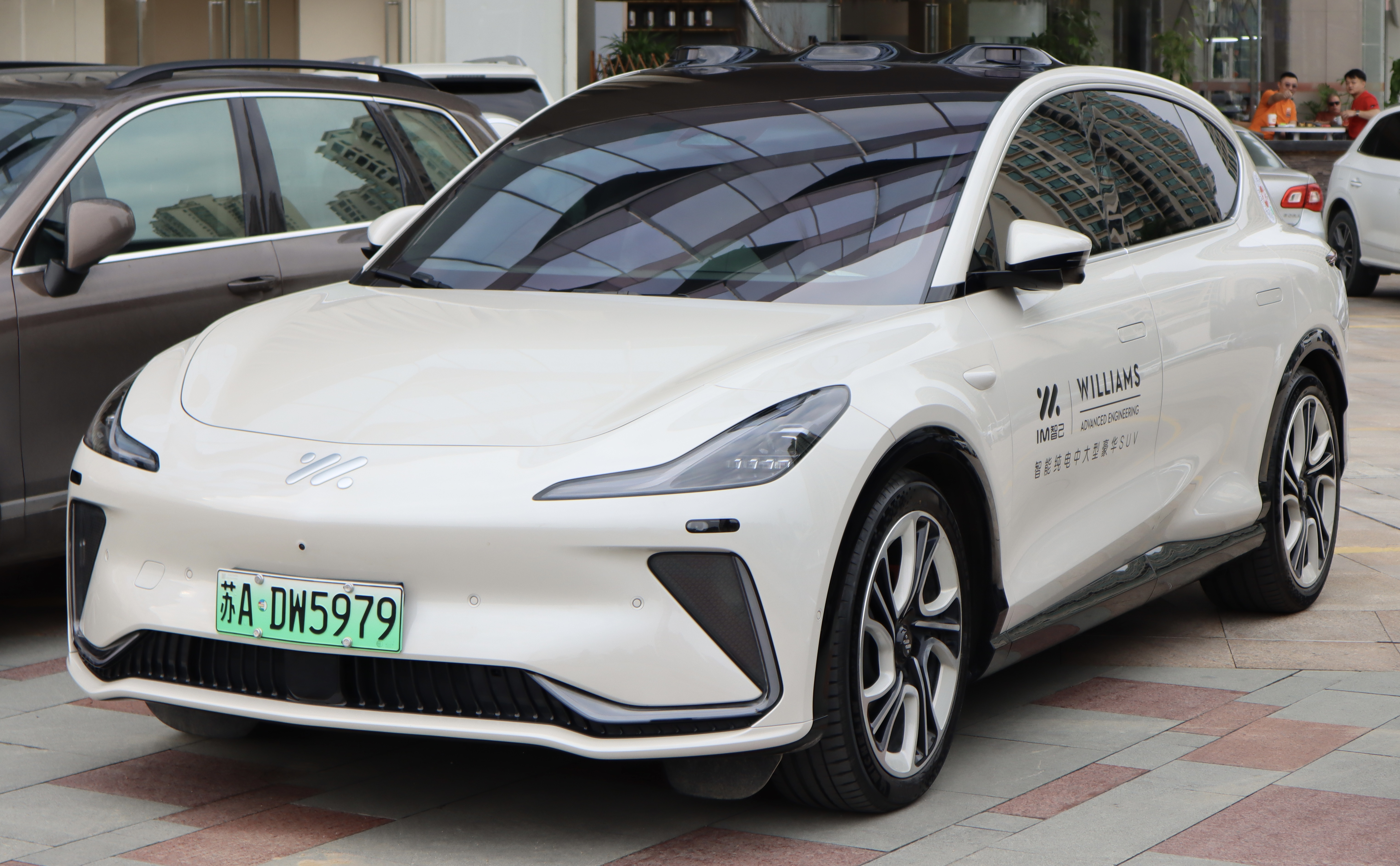
IM LS7

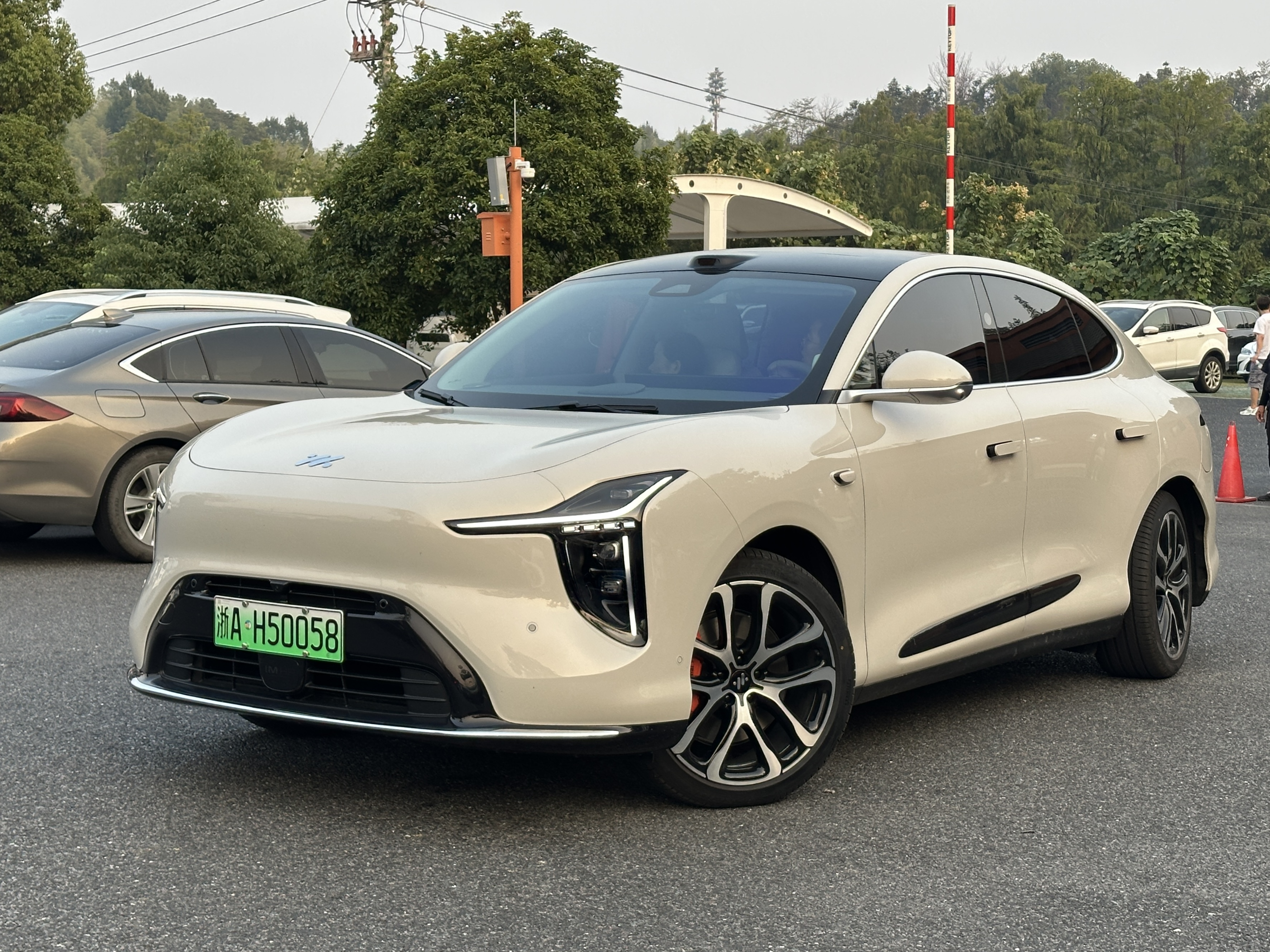
IM LS6

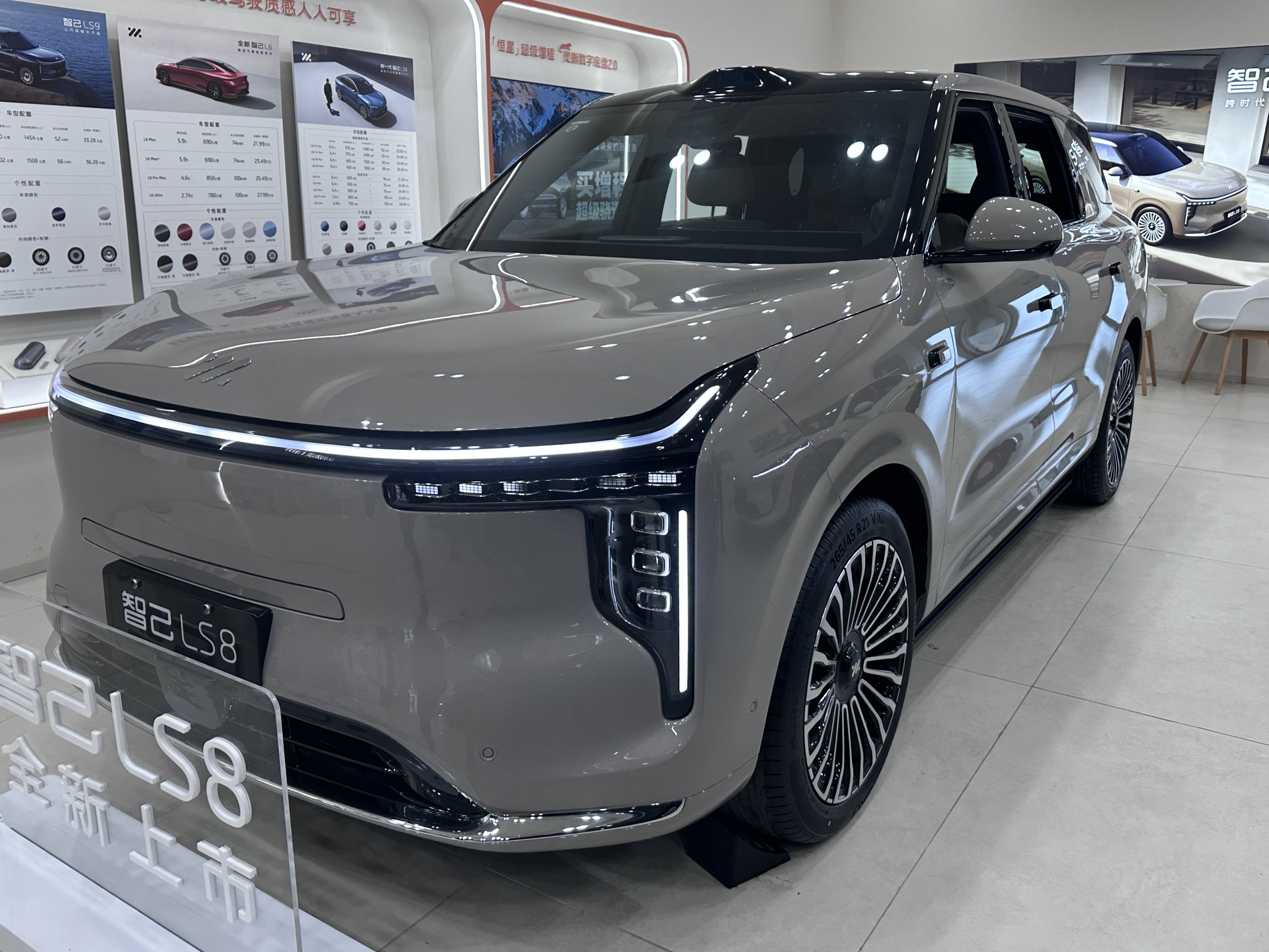
IM LS8

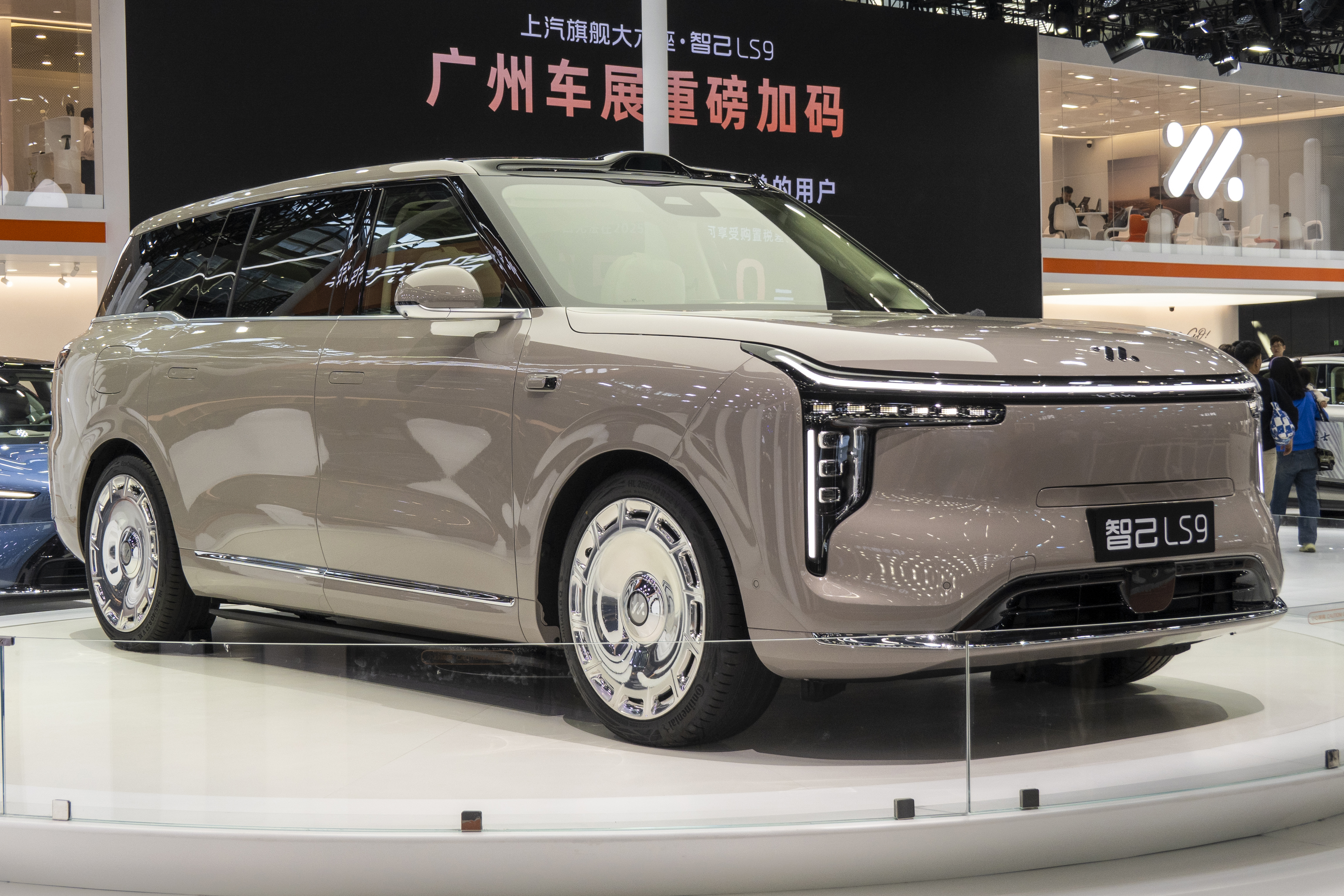
IM LS9

=== Concept vehicles ===
IM Motors has revealed the following concept cars:

- Airo (Auto Shanghai 2021), a 4-door concept car designed by Heatherwick Studio.
- LS7 (Auto Shanghai 2021), a mid-size SUV concept previewing the production LS7
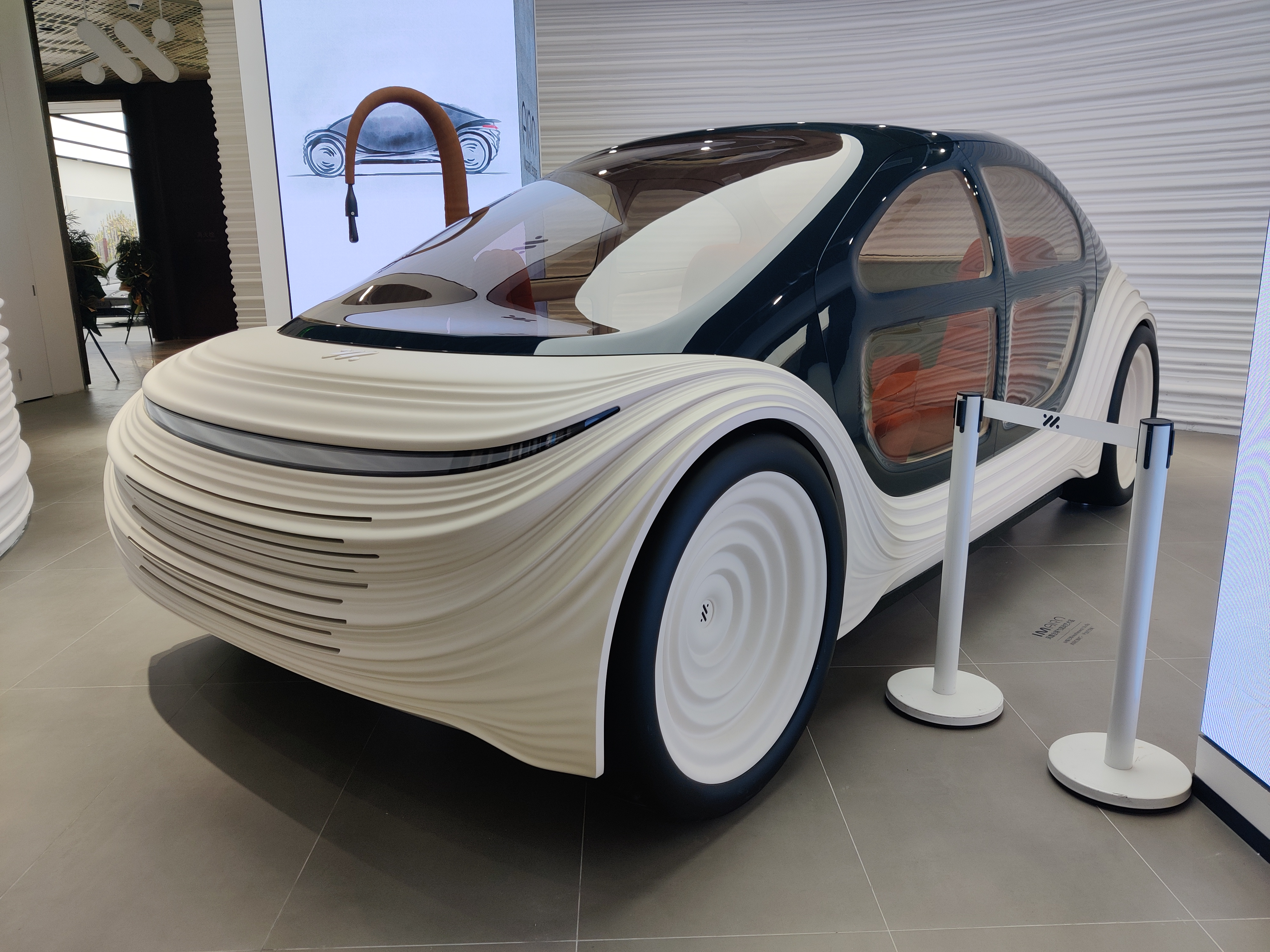
IM Airo Concept

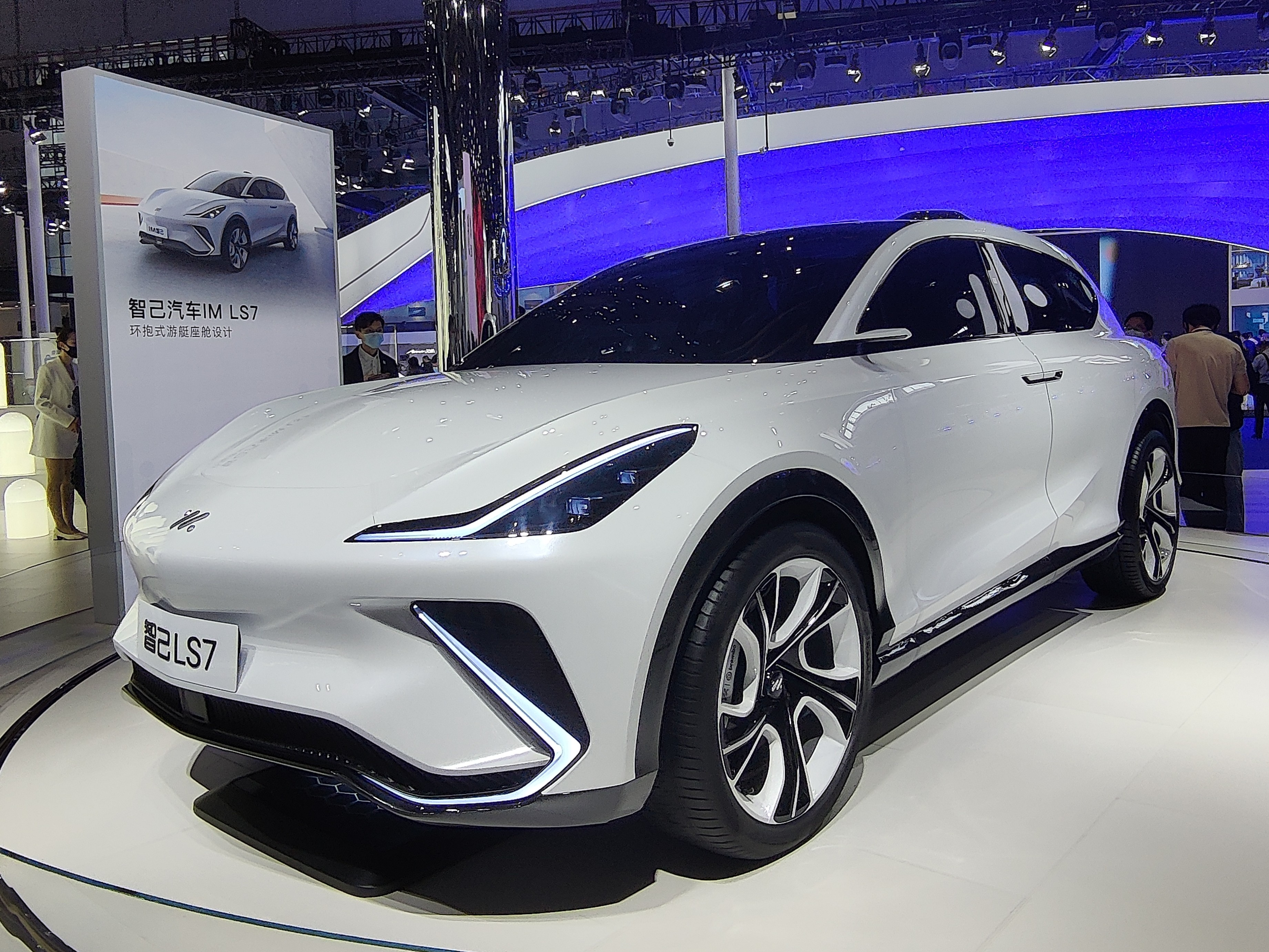
IM LS7 Concept

== Sales ==
Calendar year	Total sales
2022	5,000
2023	38,253
2024	65,505
2025	81,017

== See also ==
- Automobile manufacturers and brands of China
- List of automobile manufacturers of China
- Momenta
