= IM LS9 =

Range-extended full-size luxury SUV

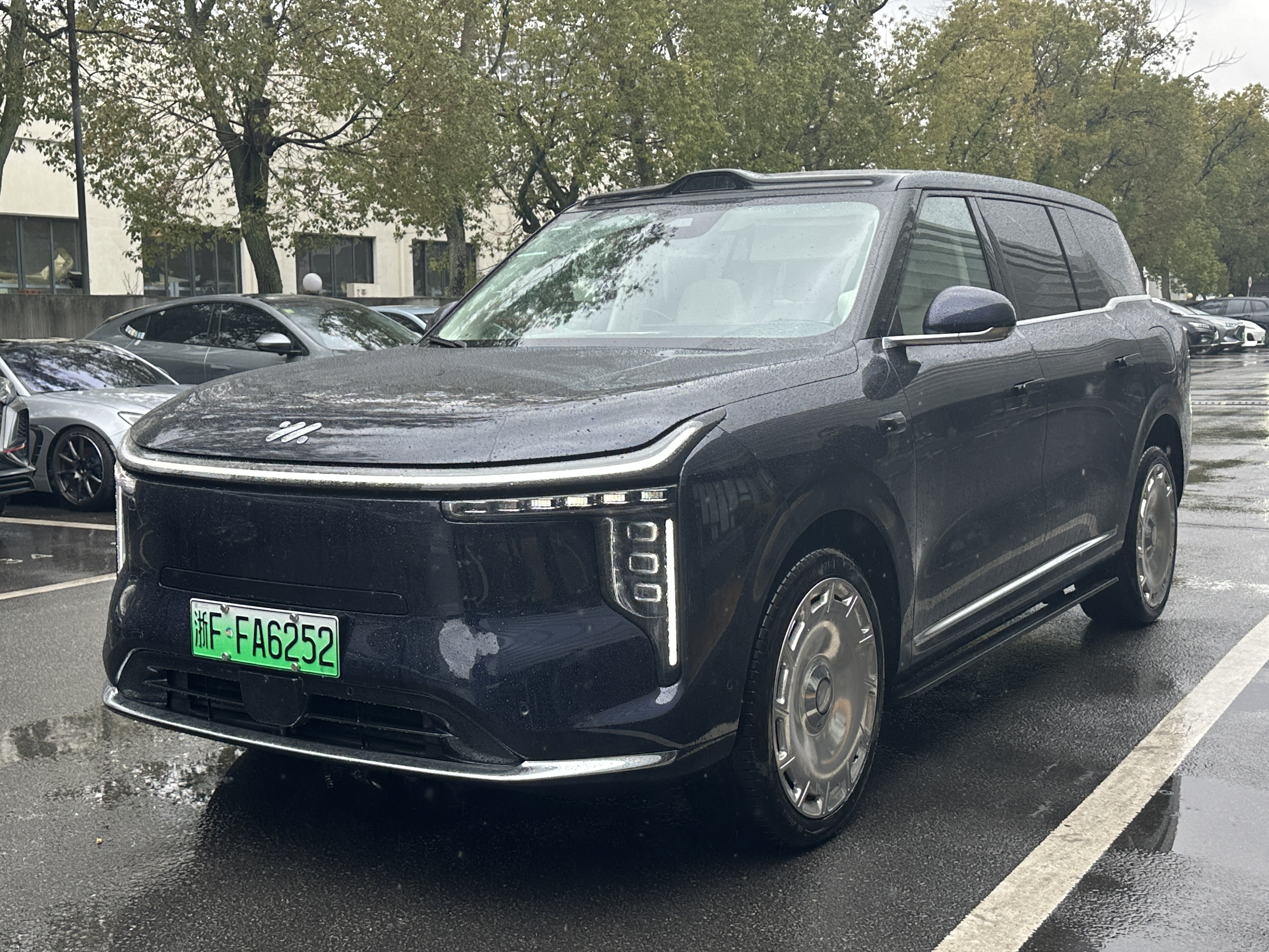

Overview
- Manufacturer: IM Motors
- Model code: S31L
- Also called: IM LS9 Hyper (tri-motor)
- Production: 2025–present
- Assembly: China: Shanghai

Body and chassis
- Class: Full-size luxury SUV (F)
- Body style: 5-door SUV
- Layout: Front-engine, dual or tri-motor, all-wheel-drive
- Chassis: Unibody
- Related: IM LS8

Powertrain
- Engine: Gasoline range extender: 1.5 L 15FNE turbo I4
- Power output: 523 hp (390 kW; 530 PS); 737 hp (550 kW; 747 PS) (Hyper)
- Hybrid drivetrain: Series hybrid
- Battery: 69.5 kWh CATL Freevoy
- Electric range: 308 km (191 mi) (CLTC, Hyper); 402 km (250 mi) (CLTC)

Dimensions
- Wheelbase: 3,160 mm (124.4 in)
- Length: 5,279 mm (207.8 in)
- Width: 2,000 mm (78.7 in)
- Height: 1,806 mm (71.1 in)
- Curb weight: 2,695 kg (5,941 lb)

The IM LS9 (Chinese: 智己LS9; pinyin: Zhìjǐ LS9) is a range-extended full-size luxury SUV produced by SAIC Motor under the IM Motors brand. It is IM's first EREV-only model.

== Overview ==
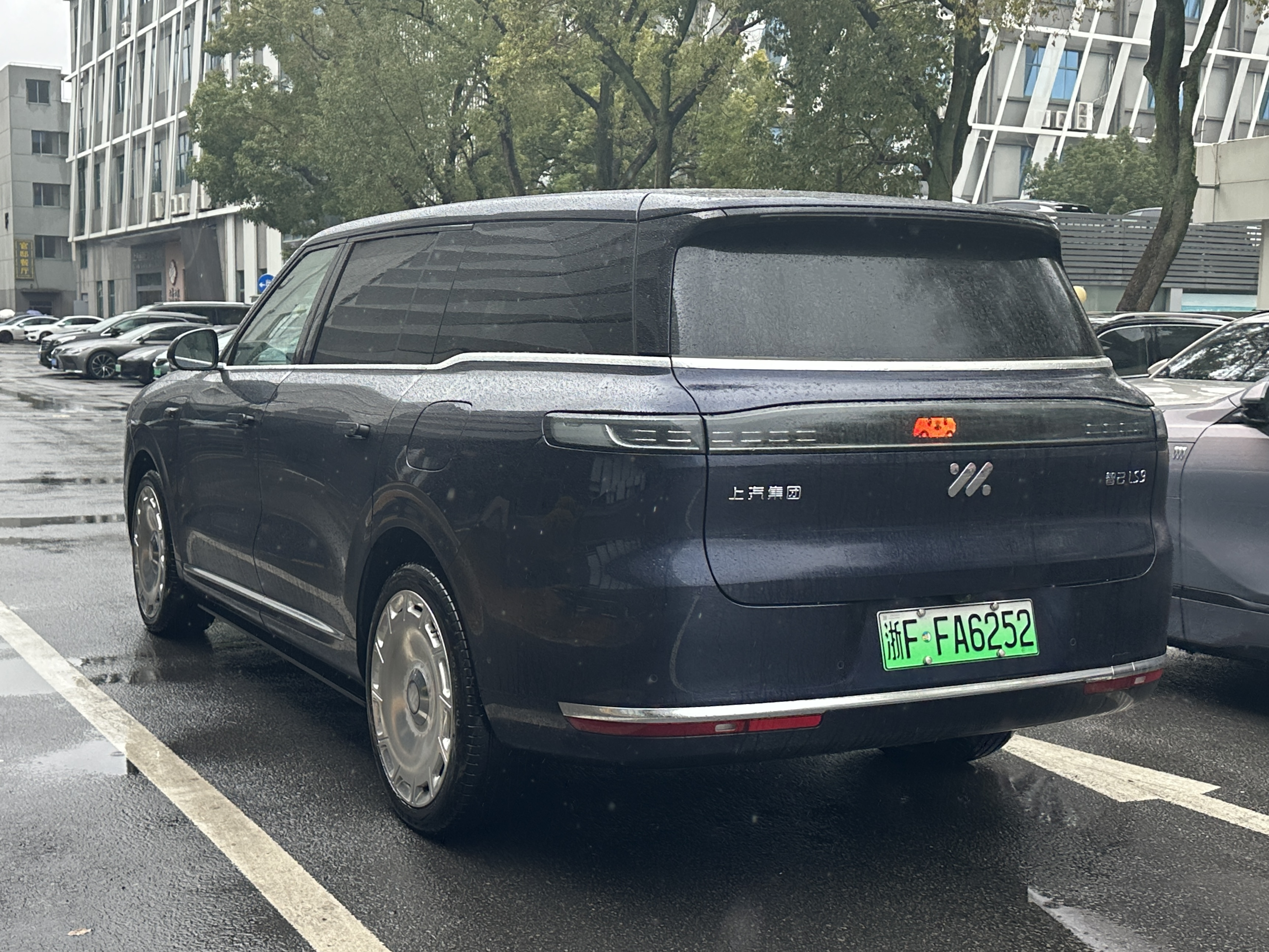
Rear view

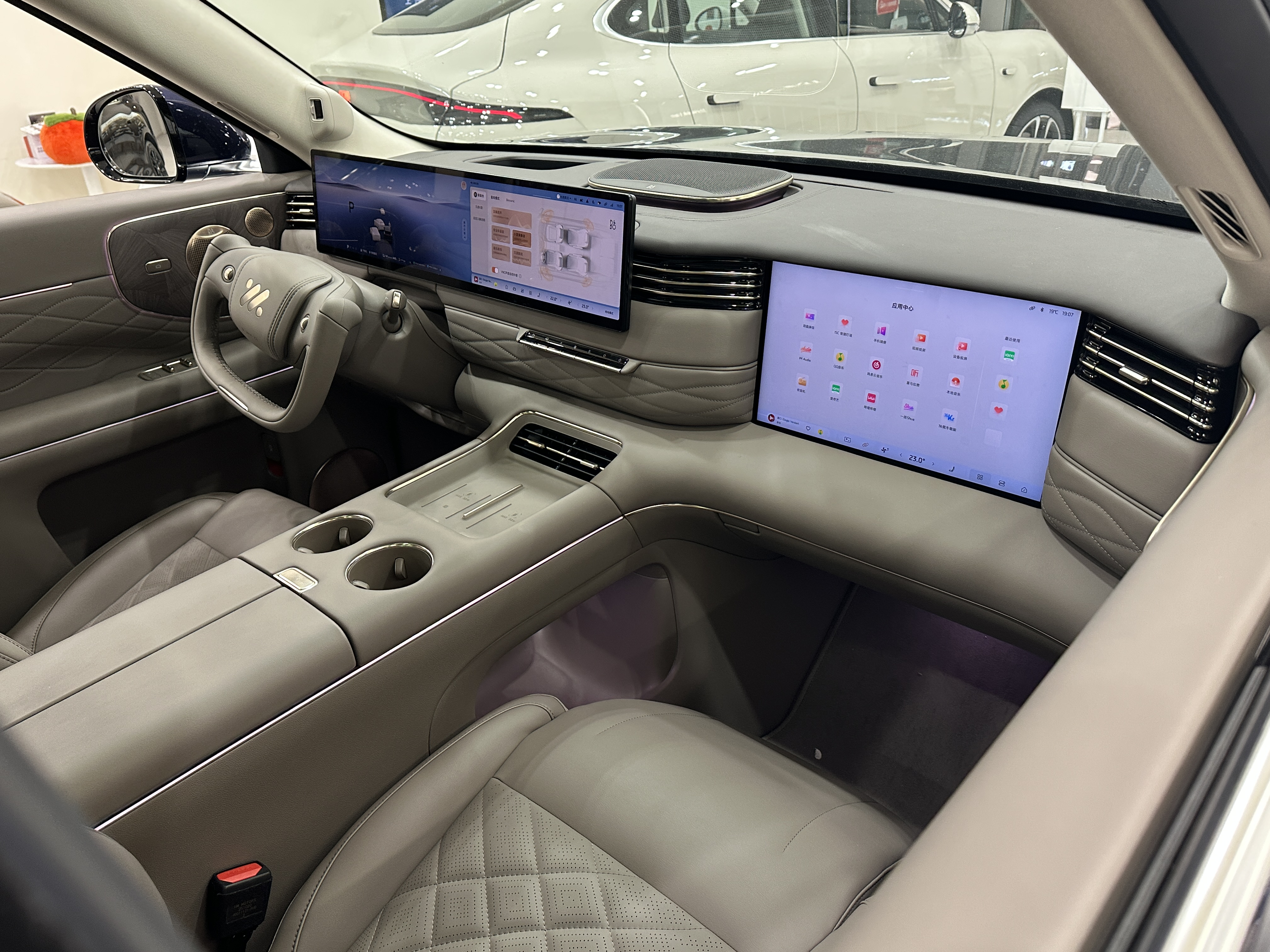
Interior

The LS9 was the brand's second range extended electric vehicle. It will also be one of China's longest-range hybrids, although the range of the LS9 is not yet known. The LS9 was set to debut on November 4, 2025, with pre-sales starting on the same day. However, the debut was moved to November 12. The LS9 is positioned as the brand's flagship model.

The LS9 was first shown during the 2025 China International Industry Fair on September 23, 2025 with no prior announcement.

The official launch of the LS9 took place on November 12, 2025.

=== Design ===
The LS9 uses a front end design similar to that of the facelifted LS6 with its Y-shaped headlights. Full-width light bars are present at both the front and back. The front end is closed and has a small air intake on the bottom. Retractable door handles, a slightly slanted roofline, and 5-spoke wheels are also present in the LS9's design. The interior uses an oval-shaped 2-spoke steering wheel.

=== Features ===
A LiDAR system will be available on the LS9 with it being part of an ADAS system expected to be supplied by Momenta.

At launch, it was announced that customers can choose between a half-spoke or full-spoke steering wheel. Regardless of what steering model is optioned, sliding rotary controls are used on both sides of the wheel. The LS9's interior adopts a similar layout to the IM LS6, featuring a 27.1-inch 5K MiniLED dual central control screen and a 15.6-inch 3K MiniLED passenger entertainment screen. The LS9 has a four-wheel steering system that allows the rear wheels to turn up to 24 degrees. It also features a refrigerator in the interior as standard.

Also equipped on the LS9 are "outdoor luxury" features such as a tent hanging from tailgate, water heater, a water tank with a ten litre capacity, shower, and graphene-based underfloor heating.

== IM LS9 Hyper ==
The IM LS9 Hyper is the high-performance version of the LS9 and is IM Motors' flagship model. It was unveiled on January 28, 2026 and is the first production car to use an electronic four-wheel steering system. Compared to the regular LS9 it uses a tri-motor system. Hyper models also receive exclusive badging on the D-pillar and on the tailgate.

=== Delivery milestone ===
On May 28, 2026, SAIC Motor delivered its 100 million vehicle, an LS9 Hyper in Shanghai, becoming the first automotive group in the history of China automotive industry to achieve a cumulative production and sales volume of over 100 million vehicles.

== Powertrain ==
The total power output is 523 horsepower (390 kW; 530 PS) from a 160 kW (215 hp; 218 PS) front motor and a 230 kW (308 hp; 313 PS) rear motor. A 153 horsepower (114 kW; 155 PS) 1.5-liter turbocharged inline-4 petrol engine will be used as a generator, and is not mechanically connected to the wheels.

The battery range of the LS9 was originally 450 kilometres (280 mi). This figure was changed to 402 kilometres (250 mi) when the launch date was announced. The battery was confirmed to be CATL's Freevoy on the same day, with a capacity of 65.9 kWh.

The LS9 Hyper uses the same battery as the regular LS9, but gets a smaller electric range of 308 kilometres (191 mi) and has a power output of 737 horsepower (550 kW; 747 PS) with the front motor still producing 215 hp (160 kW; 218 PS) while the two rear motors produce 261 horsepower (195 kW; 265 PS) each.

== Sales ==
Year	China
2025	5,228
