= IM L7 =

Chinese full-size electric sedan

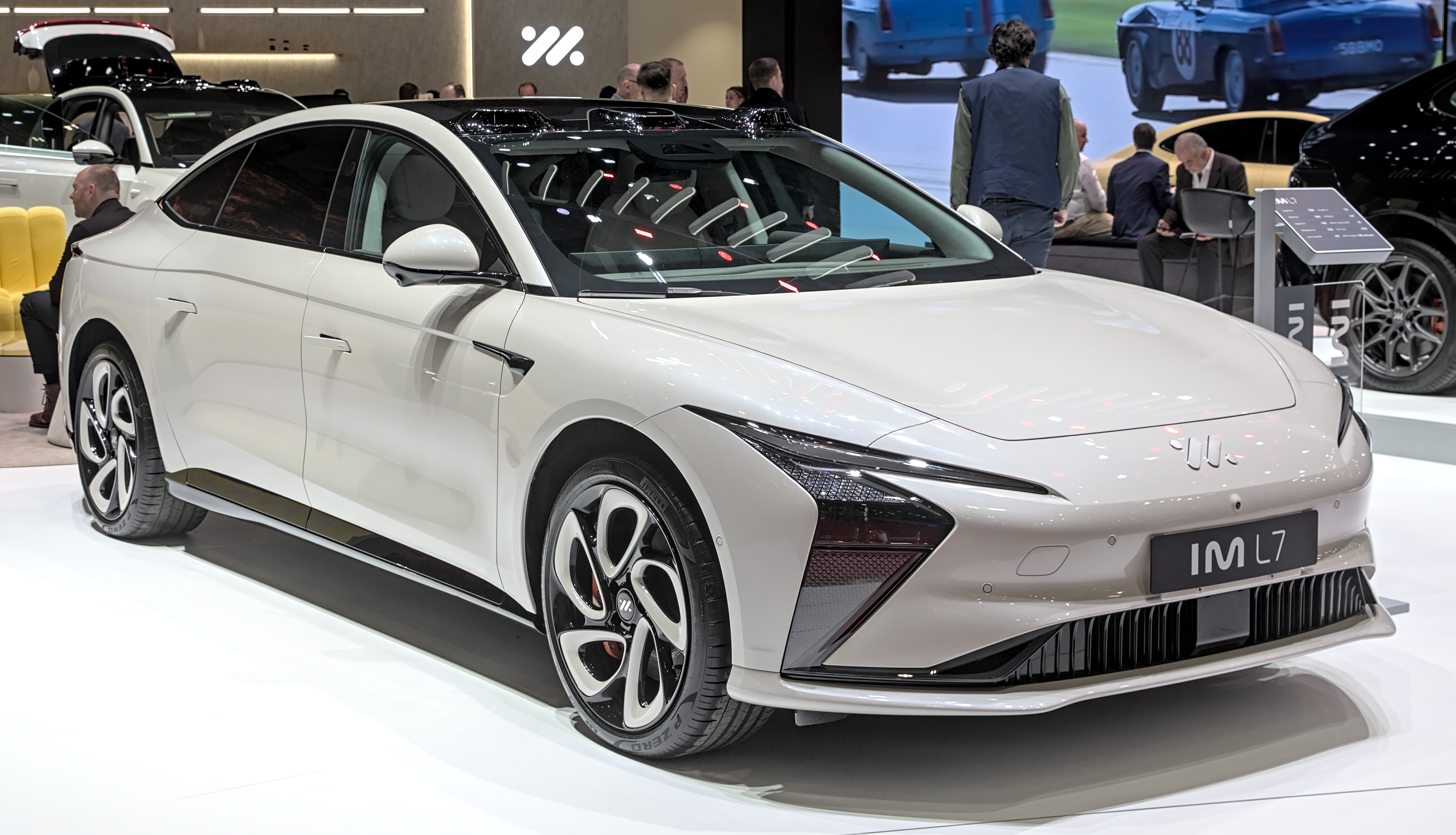

Overview
- Manufacturer: IM Motors
- Model code: EP33/P11L
- Production: 2022–present
- Assembly: China: Shanghai

Body and chassis
- Class: Full-size car (E)
- Body style: 4-door sedan
- Layout: Rear motor, rear-wheel drive; Dual-motor, all-wheel drive

Powertrain
- Electric motor: Permanent magnet synchronous
- Power output: 335–570 hp (250–425 kW; 340–578 PS); 597 hp (445 kW; 605 PS) (Snake Performance)
- Transmission: 1-speed direct-drive
- Battery: 90 kWh NMC CATL
- Electric range: 615–708 km (382–440 mi) (CLTC)

Dimensions
- Wheelbase: 3,100 mm (122.0 in)
- Length: 5,098–5,108 mm (200.7–201.1 in)
- Width: 1,960 mm (77.2 in)
- Height: 1,485 mm (58.5 in)
- Curb weight: 2,090–2,290 kg (4,610–5,050 lb)

The IM L7 (Chinese: 智己L7; pinyin: Zhìjǐ L7) is a battery electric full-size sedan produced by Chinese automobile manufacturer IM Motors, also known as Zhiji Motors, a joint venture between SAIC Motor, Pudong New Area and Alibaba. It is the brand's first vehicle, and production of the vehicle started in early 2022.

== Overview ==
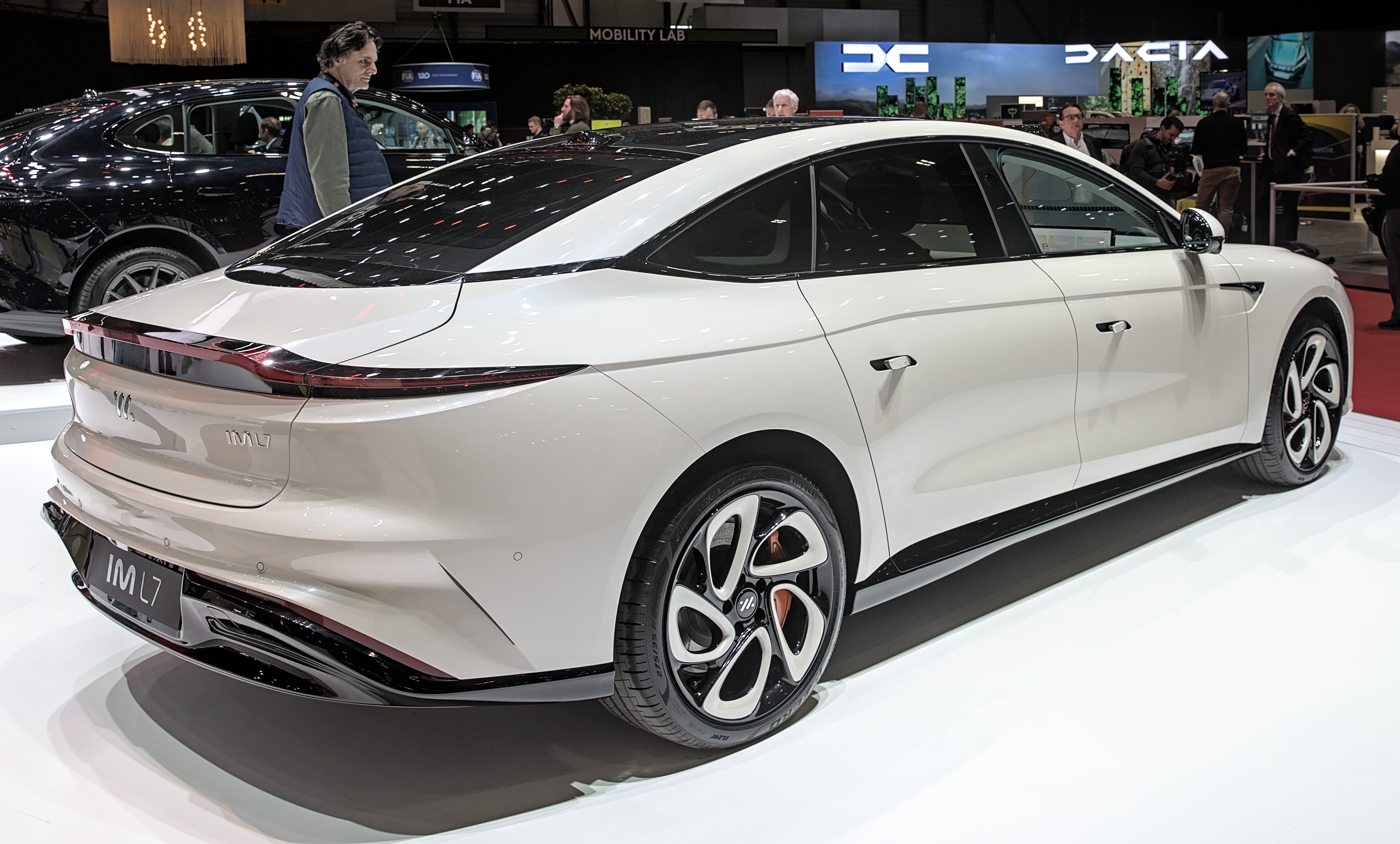
IM L7 rear

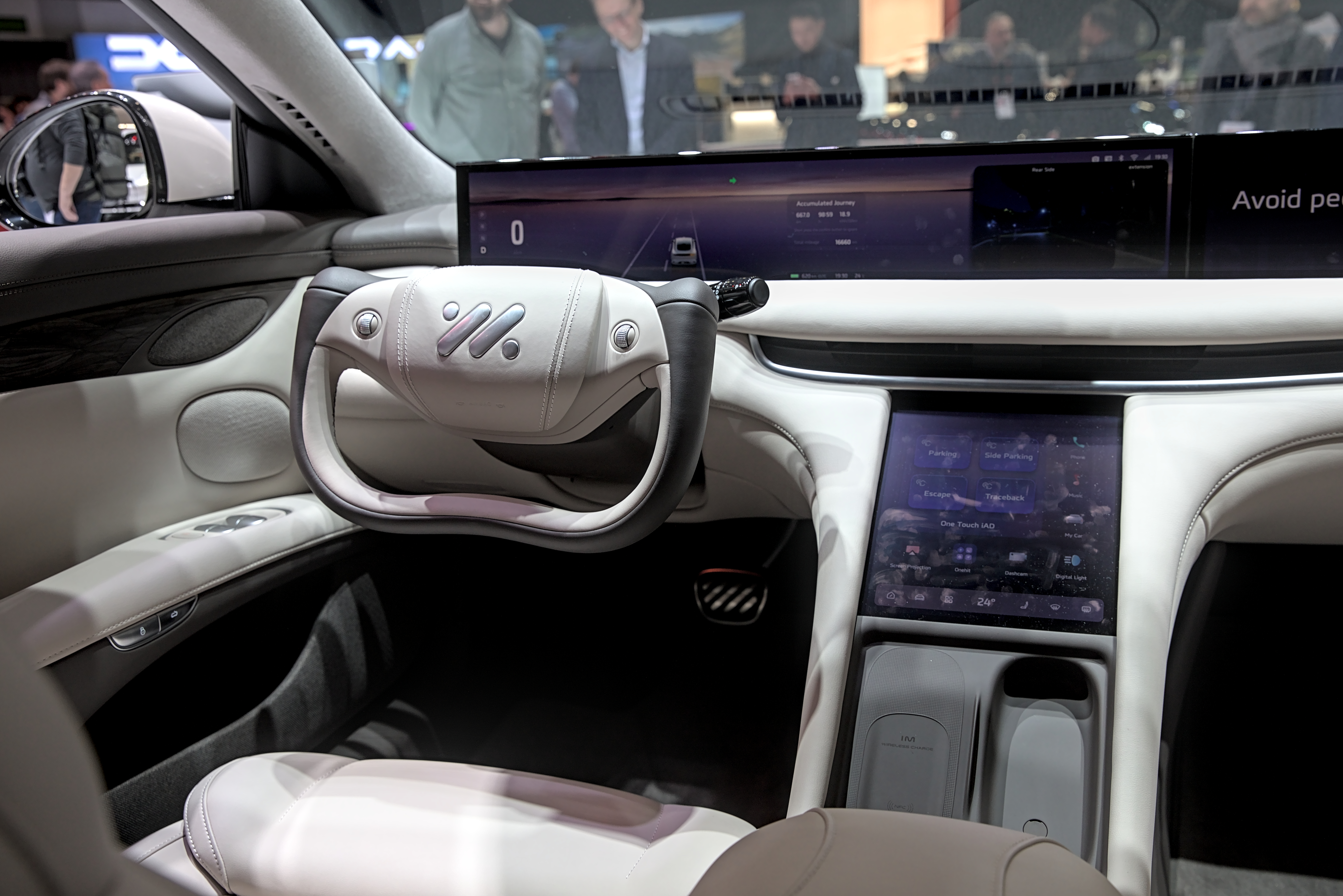
Interior

The IM L7 was revealed as a prototype on 19 April 2021, at Auto Shanghai, alongside the IM LS7 concept SUV and Airo concept car. On the same day, the car went on pre-sale. Deliveries were set to begin on 17 April 2022, but lockdown disruptions in Shanghai in response to a spike in infections caused by the COVID-19 Omicron variant delayed the launch to late June 2022. The L7 is intended to be a competitor of the shorter Tesla Model S in the Chinese car market, with its IM AD autonomous driving system, and went on sale in Q1 2022.

The front of the L7 features a lower air intake with active grille shutters and large lighting modules with long sigma shaped daytime running lights. The LED headlights can act as 2.6 megapixel DLP projectors which can display an image onto the ground ahead, and panels above and below the headlights contain a 5,000 pixel LED display which can display images or animations to communicate with other road users such as pedestrians. It has pop-out door handles, and the rear taillights have a light bar design.

The interior features a 26.3-inch display on the dashboard which contains both the instrument cluster along with infotainment functions, alongside a separate 12.3-inch passenger entertainment touchscreen which together form a dashboard spanning panel. The two dashboard-mounted displays are capable of independently sliding partially down into the dashboard for a simplified view. Additionally, a 12.8-inch vertically-oriented 2K OLED touchscreen display is placed in the center console for infotainment as well as climate controls. The car is equipped with a 22-speaker sound system with a total output of 1120 watts. The vehicle uses touch capacitive buttons in the door-mounted window and mirror adjustment controls and the control pads on the flat-bottomed steering wheel.

The IM L7's chassis was co-developed with British engineering consultant Williams Advanced Engineering, and features a continuous damping control electronic-controlled damping system, and 12-degrees of rear wheel steering allowing for a turning radius of 5.4 metres (18 ft). It uses staggered wheels, with 245 mm (9.6 in) wide tires used on the front axle and 275 mm (10.8 in) wide on the rear wheels. It has a drag coefficient of 0.21 C_{d}.

The IM L7 uses the company's IM AD intelligent driving system, which uses Nvidia's Jetson Xavier SoC, 2 LiDARs, 11 cameras, 5 millimeter wave radars, and 12 ultrasonic sensors. This enables the car to be driven autonomously on freeways and semi-autonomously on city streets, as well be summoned by the driver and parked by itself. Initially the system was limited to areas around Shanghai due to the system's reliance on high resolution map coverage, and subsequent over-the-air updates expanded coverage to more cities. In November 2024, the beta release of map-free urban autonomous driving system was released via an OTA update.

=== 2024 refresh ===
On 24 February 2024 IM launched a refreshed version of the L7. Along with updates to the vehicle keeping it in line with other IM models, the refreshed L7 receives a price reduction of CN¥ 38,900 (US$5,406), an 11.5% decrease.

The exterior remains nearly unchanged except for a slightly modified lower rear bumper that adds 10 mm (0.39 in) to the vehicle length. The interior receives an optional yoke-style semi-circular steering wheel, and the dashboard displays now have a narrower bezel and the passenger entertainment screen is now a 15.5-inch unit, as seen in the LS7. The touch capacitive buttons on the door-mounted window controls and steering wheel were replaced with conventional physical switches. The storage capacity of the center console bin and door pocket have been increased, and the wireless charger upgraded to 50 W from 15 W. The rear seat cushions have been lengthened by 30 mm (1.2 in) to 520 mm (20.5 in), and the seats now have power adjustable leg rest and seatback rake. Both front and rear seats have heating, ventilation, and massaging functions.

The autonomous driving system was also updated, with a single Nvidia Orin X SoC replacing the previous generation Xavier chip, providing an eightfold increase in computational power. Additionally, two of the forward facing cameras were upgraded from 5 megapixels to 8 megapixels, and all models come standard with LiDAR units, allowing for better urban NOA capabilities.

Powertrain and performance specifications remain the same, but optimizations allow for range numbers to increase to 708 kilometres (440 mi) and 625 kilometres (388 mi) for rear-wheel and all-wheel drive models, respectively.

== Powertrain ==
The base variant of the L7 uses a single rear motor with 335 hp (250 kW; 340 PS), while the all-wheel drive variants add an additional 237 hp (177 kW; 240 PS) front motor in a dual-motor setup for a total of 570 hp (425 kW; 578 PS). The only available battery is a 90 kWh NMC CATL-supplied pack, allowing for a CLTC range rating of 675 kilometres (419 mi) for the single-motor model or 615 kilometres (382 mi) for the dual-motor variant. The single motor model has a 0–100 km/h (62 mph) acceleration time of 5.9 seconds, while dual-motor variants are capable of 3.87 seconds. The IM L7 is capable of 11 kW wireless charging of its traction battery, with a claimed 91% efficiency and at a rate of up to 80 kilometres (50 mi) of added range per hour.

== Snake Performance variant ==
At the 2022 Chengdu Auto Show, IM revealed a performance concept version of the L7 with tuning by Williams Advanced Engineering, featuring tinted lights, blue-painted Brembo brakes, and a 'W' badge resembling the Millbrook test track. On 30 December 2022 at Auto Guangzhou 2022 the Snake Performance variant was launched. It is a high-performance version of the L7 based on the dual-motor model, with power increased to 597 hp (445 kW; 605 PS) and 730 N⋅m (538 lb⋅ft) of torque, allowing for a 0–100 km/h (62 mph) acceleration time of 3.7 seconds. It includes several performance upgrades, including high performance brakes, sports-tuned suspension, black-painted multispoke forged wheels, and retuned powertrain management software. The vehicle has several exterior modifications, including matte grey paint, tinted headlight and taillight covers, snakeskin pattern accents on the pillars, snakeskin patterned badges, and a rear lip spoiler. The interior remains unchanged other than a change to black microsuede upholstery. It set a laptime of 1:42.212 at the Zhejiang International Circuit, setting the record for fastest production vehicle at the circuit, and making it the only Chinese vehicle in the top 80 fastest laptimes at the time.

=== Snake Performance track prototype ===
Alongside the production version, IM also revealed an L7 Snake Performance track prototype with more extreme exterior modifications. The front end has been redesigned with a larger front splitter, air vents replacing the lower LED display panel, the addition of dive planes, dual hood vents, and an exposed red tow hook. The sides feature a widebody kit to house black-painted five-spoke wheels with slick tires, exposed carbon fiber roof pillars, and an air intake in front of the rear wheels. The rear features a large carbon fiber rear wing on top of an exposed carbon fiber trunklid and a redesigned diffuser.

== Sales ==
Year	China
2022	4,779
2023	1,305
2024	889
2025	139
