= IM LS6 =

Electric compact luxury crossover SUV

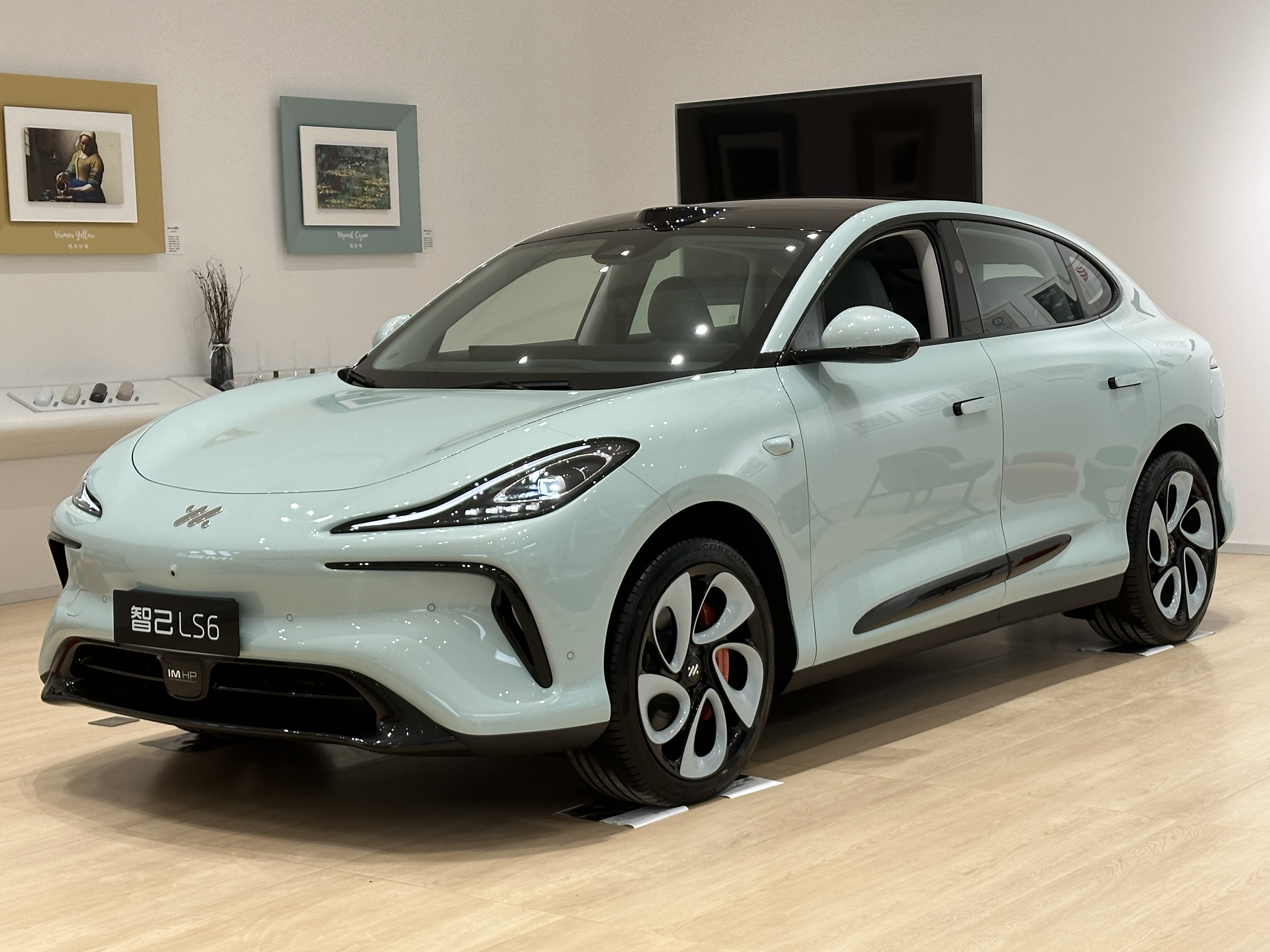

Overview
- Manufacturer: IM Motors (SAIC)
- Model code: S12L
- Also called: MG IM6 (export)
- Production: 2023–present
- Assembly: China: Shanghai

Body and chassis
- Class: Mid-size crossover SUV (D)
- Body style: 5-door coupe SUV
- Layout: Rear-motor, rear-wheel-drive (EV); Dual-motor, all-wheel-drive (EV); Front-engine, rear-motor, rear-wheel-drive (EREV)
- Platform: Advanced Digitized
- Related: IM L6 / MG IM5

Powertrain
- Engine: Petrol range extender: 1.5 L Zephyr 15FNE turbo I4
- Power output: 216–579 kW (294–787 PS; 290–776 hp) (EV); 230 kW (310 PS; 310 hp) (EREV)
- Hybrid drivetrain: Series (range extender)
- Battery: 52.1 kWh LFP Zenergy (EREV); 65.9 kWh NMC CALB (EREV); 71.2 kWh NMC CATL; 75 kWh CALB LFP; 83 kWh NMC CATL/CALB; 90 kWh NMC CATL; 100 kWh NMC CATL; 103.3 kWh NMC CATL
- Electric range: CLTC: 370–450 km (230–280 mi) (EREV); 560–760 km (350–470 mi); 605–802 km (376–498 mi) (facelift); NEDC: 510–710 km (320–440 mi); 550–750 km (340–470 mi) (facelift)
- Plug-in charging: 105–396 kW DC; V2L: 6.6 kW

Dimensions
- Wheelbase: 2,950–2,960 mm (116.1–116.5 in)
- Length: 4,904–4,910 mm (193.1–193.3 in)
- Width: 1,988 mm (78 in)
- Height: 1,669 mm (66 in)
- Kerb weight: 1,731 kg (3,816 lb)

The IM LS6 (Chinese: 智己LS6; pinyin: Zhìjǐ LS6) is a battery electric and extended-range compact SUV produced by IM Motors since 2023. The LS6 was officially launched in the Chinese market in October 2023. It is sold as the MG IM6 in some markets.

== History ==
In August 2023, IM Motors, which was on the market for less than 2 years, presented its third model as an element of the expansion of the local offer, presenting the LS6.

== Design and equipment ==
The vehicle was created as a more avant-garde styled alternative to the slightly larger LS7 model, debuting in the same year, distinguished by more decorations in the front bumper, a larger front air intake and reshaped headlights.

The roof line gently slopes towards the rear edge of the body in the so-called Coupe SUVs, in turn, the rear is decorated with a characteristic wavy light strip enriched with a small window improving rear visibility. The proportions of the LS6 body were dictated by aerodynamic properties, which resulted in a record-low air drag coefficient of 0.23.

Similarly to the LS7, the LS6 has an unusually designed cockpit consisting of two screens: the first one runs across the entire width of the dashboard and functions as digital clocks, a multimedia system screen and an entertainment centre for the passenger. The second one, vertical and located at an angle, serves, among others, air conditioning panel and control of additional vehicle functions. Instead of a steering wheel, the so-called shuttlecock without arches at the upper and lower edges.

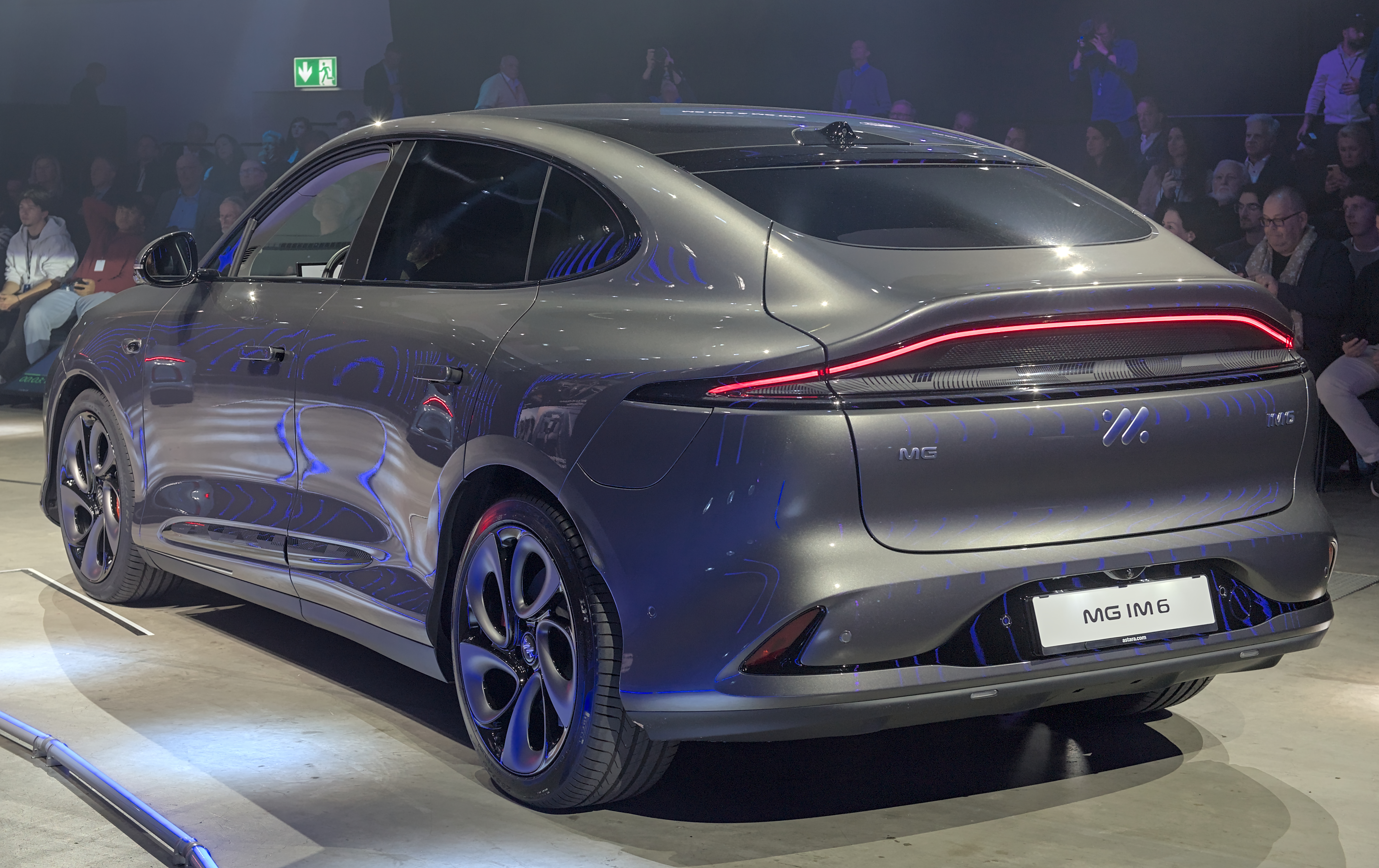
Rear view

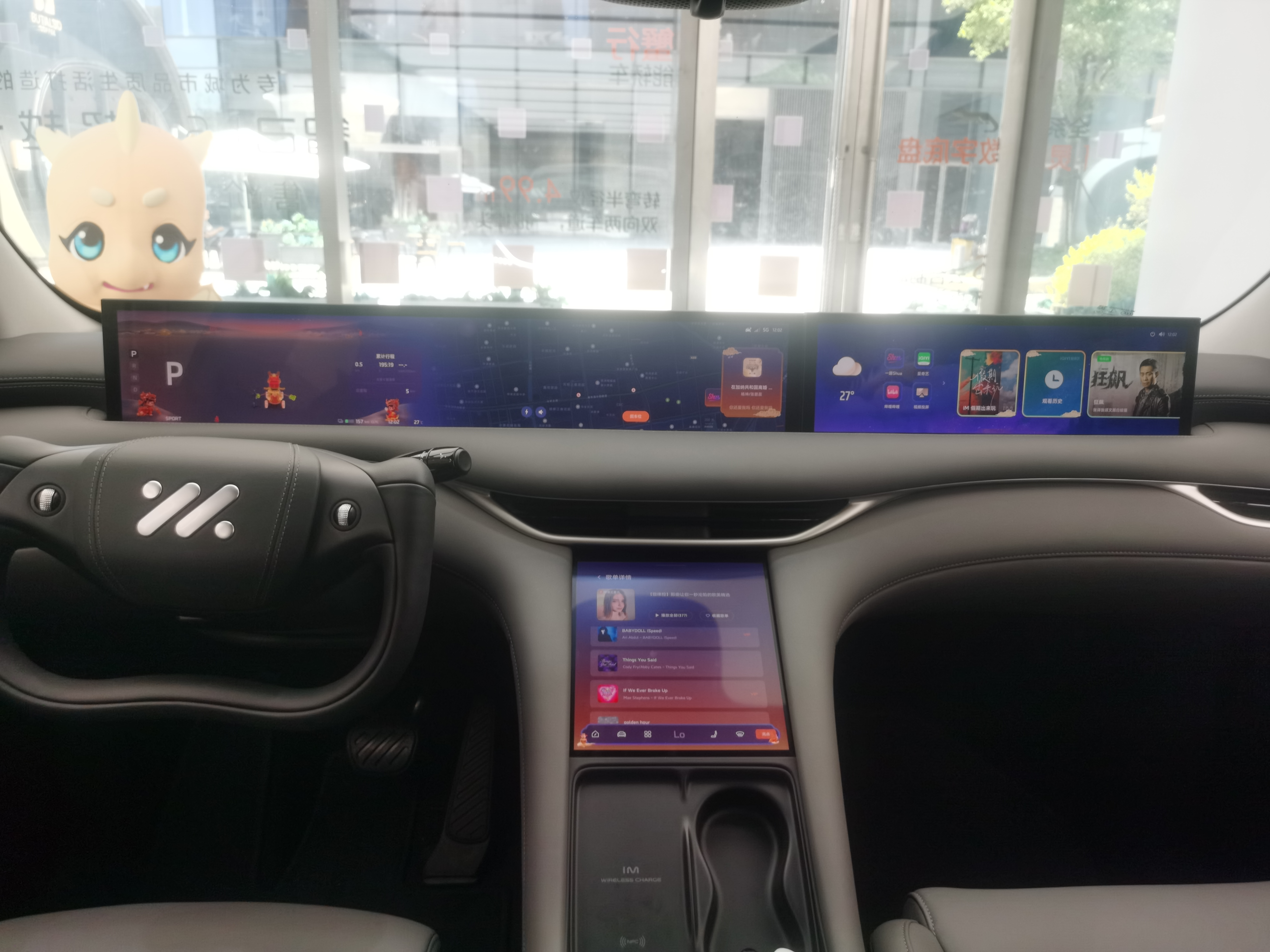
Interior (China)

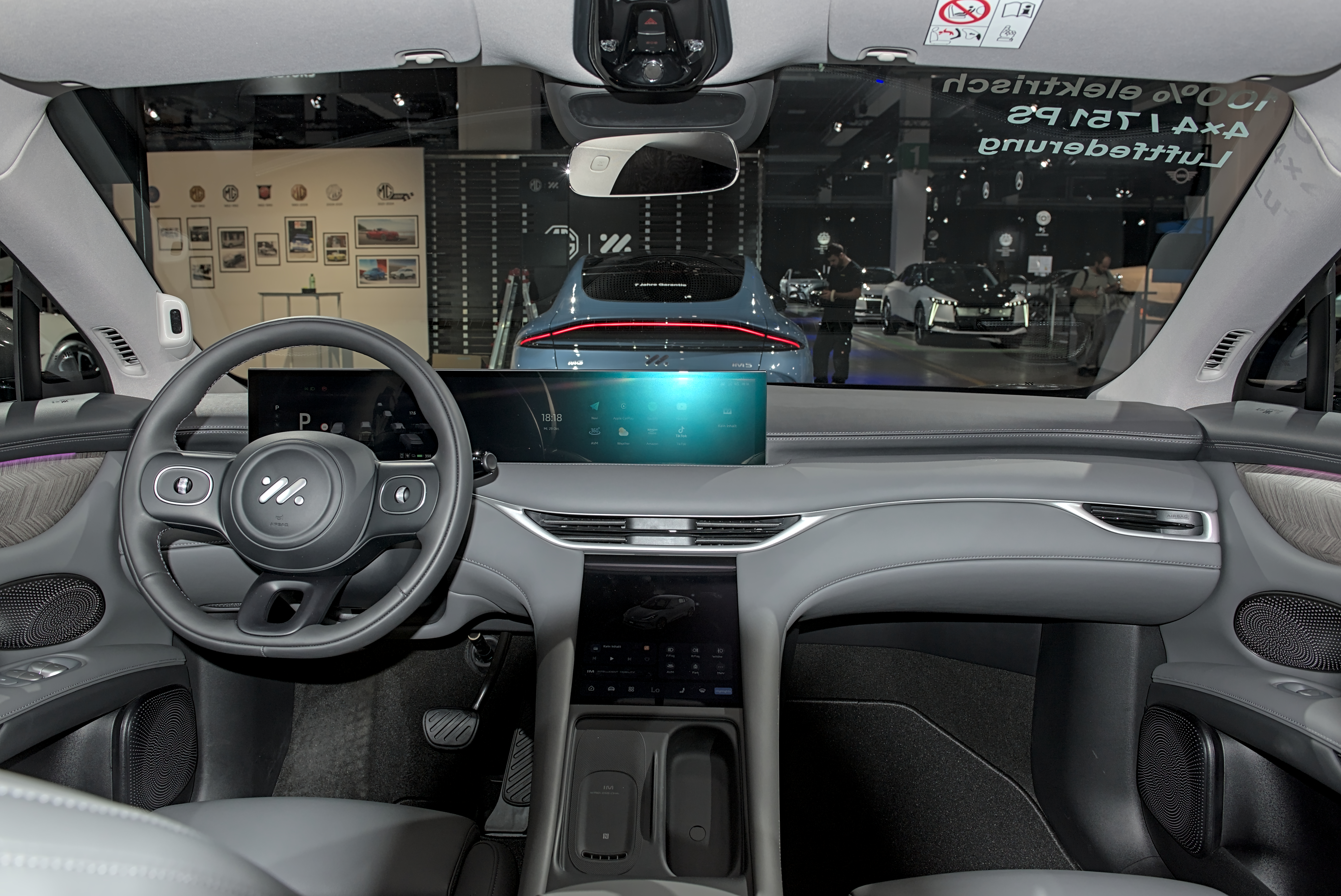
Interior (Europe)

=== Powertrain ===
The LS6 is available in two drive configurations, both of which transmit power to both axles using two motors. The first one develops 501 hp (374 kW; 508 PS), while the other one has 776 hp (579 kW; 787 PS) with 800 N⋅m (590 lb⋅ft) of maximum torque and a sprint to 100 km/h (62 mph) in 3.5 seconds. The batteries supplied by CATL enable super-fast charging with a voltage of up to 800V and a range of up to 700 km (430 mi) on a single charge with a capacity of 100 kWh. Models with the 100 kWh battery have 800-volt power electronics using Semikron-Danfoss or Infineon silicon carbide power modules.

Battery		Power	Torque	Range		Peak charge rate	0–100 km/h (62 mph)	Top speed
Type	Volt.	Power	Torque	CLTC	NEDC	Peak charge rate	0–100 km/h (62 mph)	Top speed
71 kWh NMC CATL	400V	231 kW (310 hp; 314 PS)	450 N⋅m (330 lb⋅ft)	560 km (350 mi)	510 km (320 mi)	105 kW	5.9 sec	200 km/h (120 mph)
90 kWh NMC CATL	400V	250 kW (340 hp; 340 PS)	450 N⋅m (330 lb⋅ft)	680 km (420 mi)	630 km (390 mi)	105 kW	5.9 sec	200 km/h (120 mph)
100 kWh NMC CATL	800V	379 kW (508 hp; 515 PS)	500 N⋅m (370 lb⋅ft)	760 km (470 mi)	710 km (440 mi)	396 kW	5.5 sec	220 km/h (140 mph)
100 kWh NMC CATL	800V	Front: 200 kW (270 hp; 270 PS) Rear: 379 kW (508 hp; 515 PS) Total: 579 kW (776 hp; 787 PS)	Front: 300 N⋅m (220 lb⋅ft) Rear: 500 N⋅m (370 lb⋅ft) Total: 800 N⋅m (590 lb⋅ft)	702 km (436 mi)	650 km (400 mi)	396 kW	3.5 sec	252 km/h (157 mph)

== 2024 facelift ==
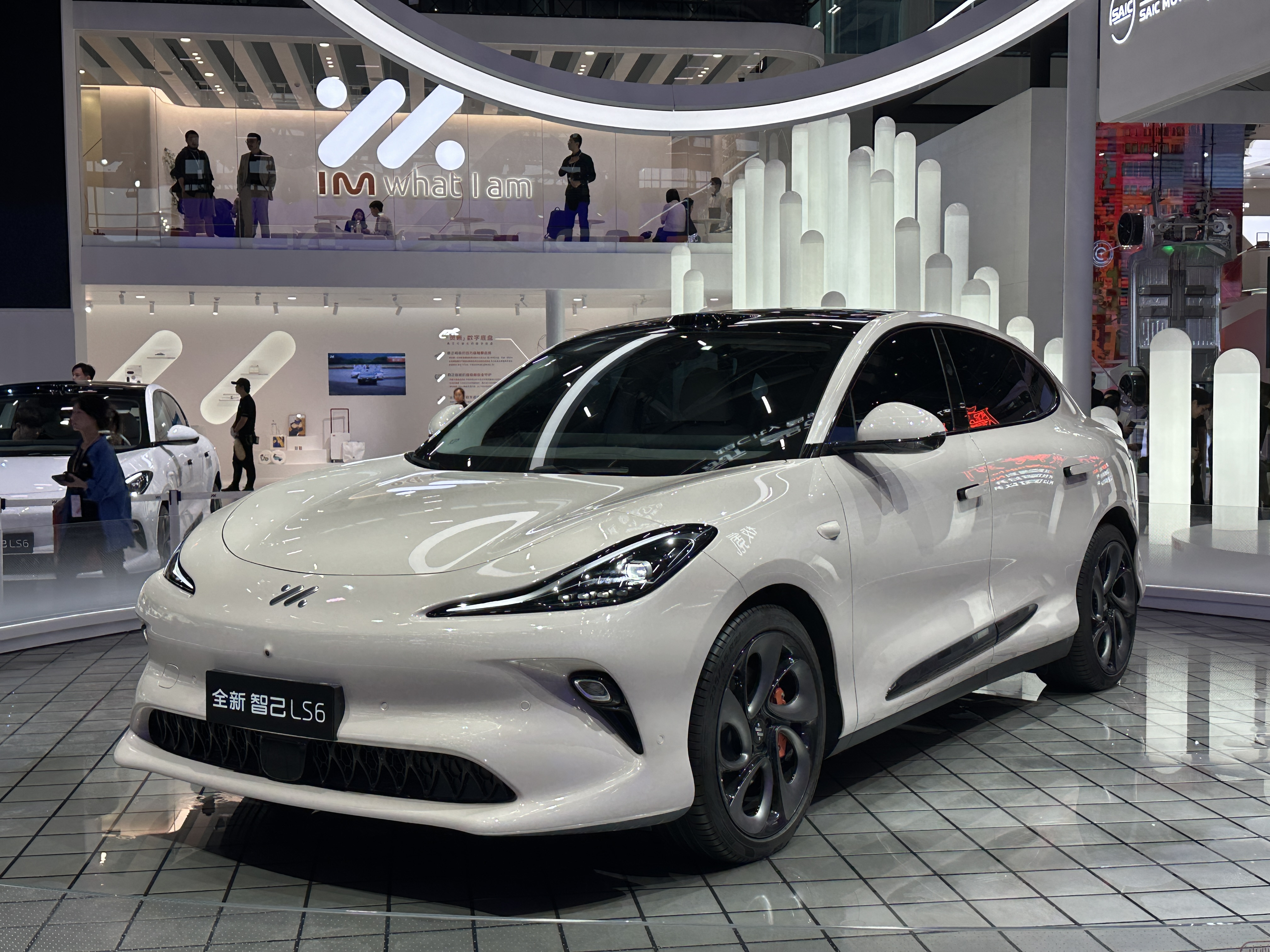
IM LS6 2024 facelift

On 26 September 2024, IM released an updated version of the LS6 with an updated powertrain and new features while retaining the previous exterior and interior design. It features the addition of the Lizard Digital Chassis system first introduced in the IM L6, which is an electronic stability control system which integrates the vehicle's rear-wheel steering, air suspension and continuous damping control. It allows the LS6 to achieve a moose test speed of 82.7 km/h (51.4 mph), and comes standard on all models. Also standard is the IM AD 3.0 ADAS system, which supports supervised urban autonomous driving and autonomous parking without the need for high-resolution maps, which utilizes a single LiDAR and Nvidia Orin chip. The front passenger seat can now recline 121-degrees into a 'zero gravity' mode, which can alternatively be used as a chaise longue for the rear seats. The infotainment system has been upgraded to the Snapdragon 8295P SoC and now supports Carlink and HiCar. The LS6 receives an optional ceiling-mounted 17.3-inch 3K-resolution rear entertainment display.

=== Powertrain ===
The base model version uses a 400V electrical architecture and a CALB-supplied LFP battery pack powering a 216 kW (290 hp; 294 PS) rear motor for 605 kilometres (376 mi) of CLTC range. The middle trims use a smaller 83 kWh battery pack but still achieve 660 kilometres (410 mi) of range. The top trims with the 100 kWh battery and 900V all-wheel drive powertrain carry over unchanged, while the rear-wheel drive version now uses a 300 kW (402 hp; 408 PS) motor.

Battery			Power	Torque	Range		0–100 km/h (62 mph)	Top speed
Type	Volt.	Weight	Power	Torque	CLTC	NEDC	0–100 km/h (62 mph)	Top speed
75 kWh LFP CALB	400V	548 kg (1,208 lb)	216 kW (290 hp; 294 PS)	450 N⋅m (330 lb⋅ft)	625 km (388 mi)	550–580 km (340–360 mi)	6.4 sec	210 km/h (130 mph)
83 kWh NMC CATL	800V	460 or 508 kg (1,014 or 1,120 lb)	248 kW (333 hp; 337 PS)	500 N⋅m (369 lb⋅ft)	701 km (436 mi)	640 km (400 mi)	5.4 sec	235 km/h (146 mph)
100 kWh NMC CATL	800V	585 kg (1,290 lb)	300 kW (400 hp; 410 PS)	500 N⋅m (369 lb⋅ft)	802 km (498 mi)	740–750 km (460–470 mi)	5.4 sec	235 km/h (146 mph)
100 kWh NMC CATL	900V	585 kg (1,290 lb)	Front: 200 kW (270 hp; 270 PS) Rear: 379 kW (508 hp; 515 PS) Total: 579 kW (776 hp; 787 PS)	Front: 300 N⋅m (220 lb⋅ft) Rear: 500 N⋅m (370 lb⋅ft) Total: 800 N⋅m (590 lb⋅ft)	750 km (470 mi)	634–702 km (394–436 mi)	3.5 sec	252 km/h (157 mph)

== 2025 facelift and EREV ==
The LS6 received a major facelift in 2025, adapting a new design language on the exterior and interior, which has spread to other models such as the LS9. The 2025 model year IM LS6 is now also available as EREV, debuting IM's "Hengxing" EREV powertrain. This powertrain includes a 66 kWh battery capable of a 450 km pure electric range paired with a 1.5-liter 15FNE petrol-powered turbocharged engine developing 153hp (114 kW). A single electric motor in the rear axle develops 308 hp (230 kW). The maximum mixed range of the model reaches 1,500 km.

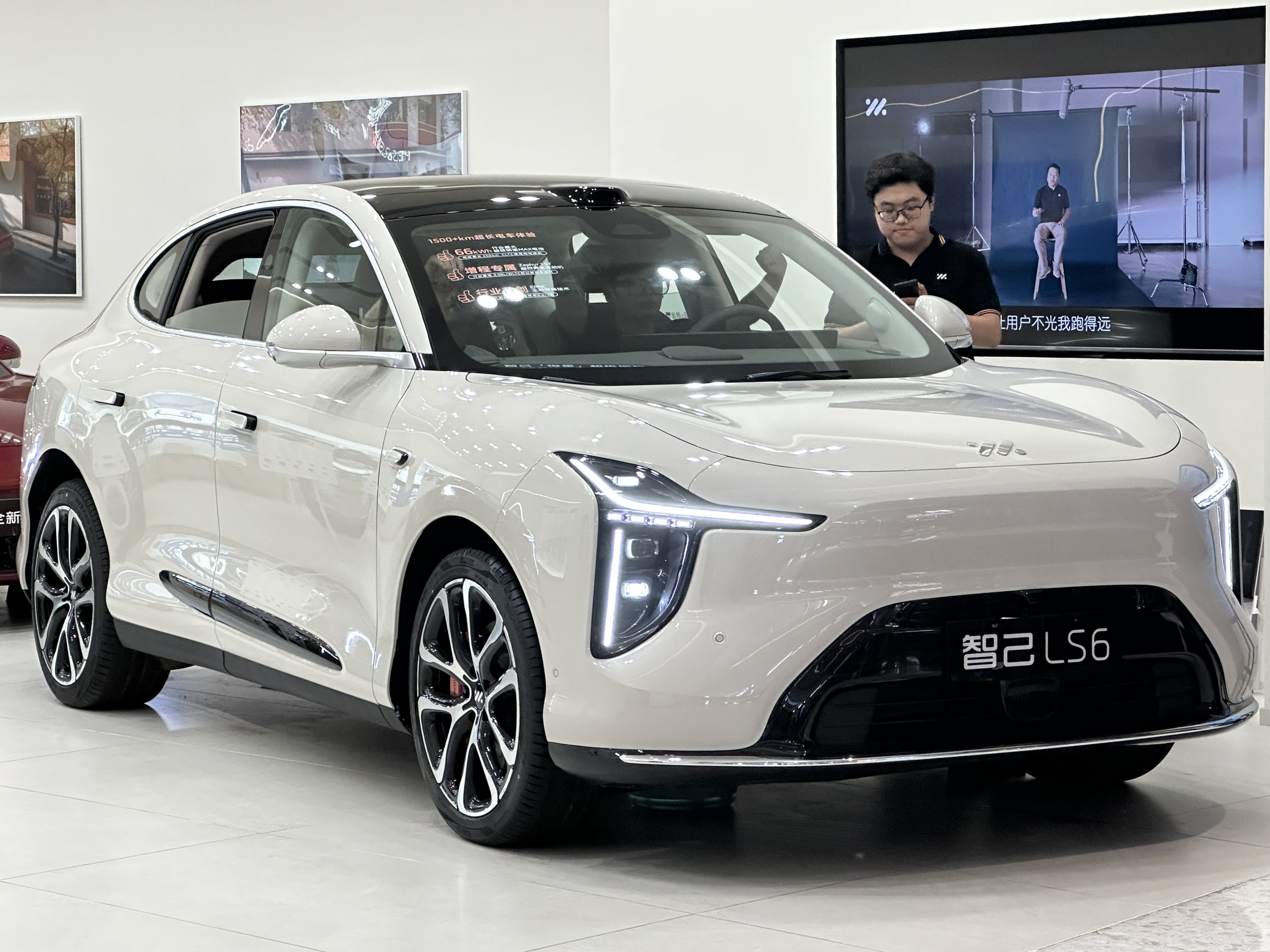
2025 facelift

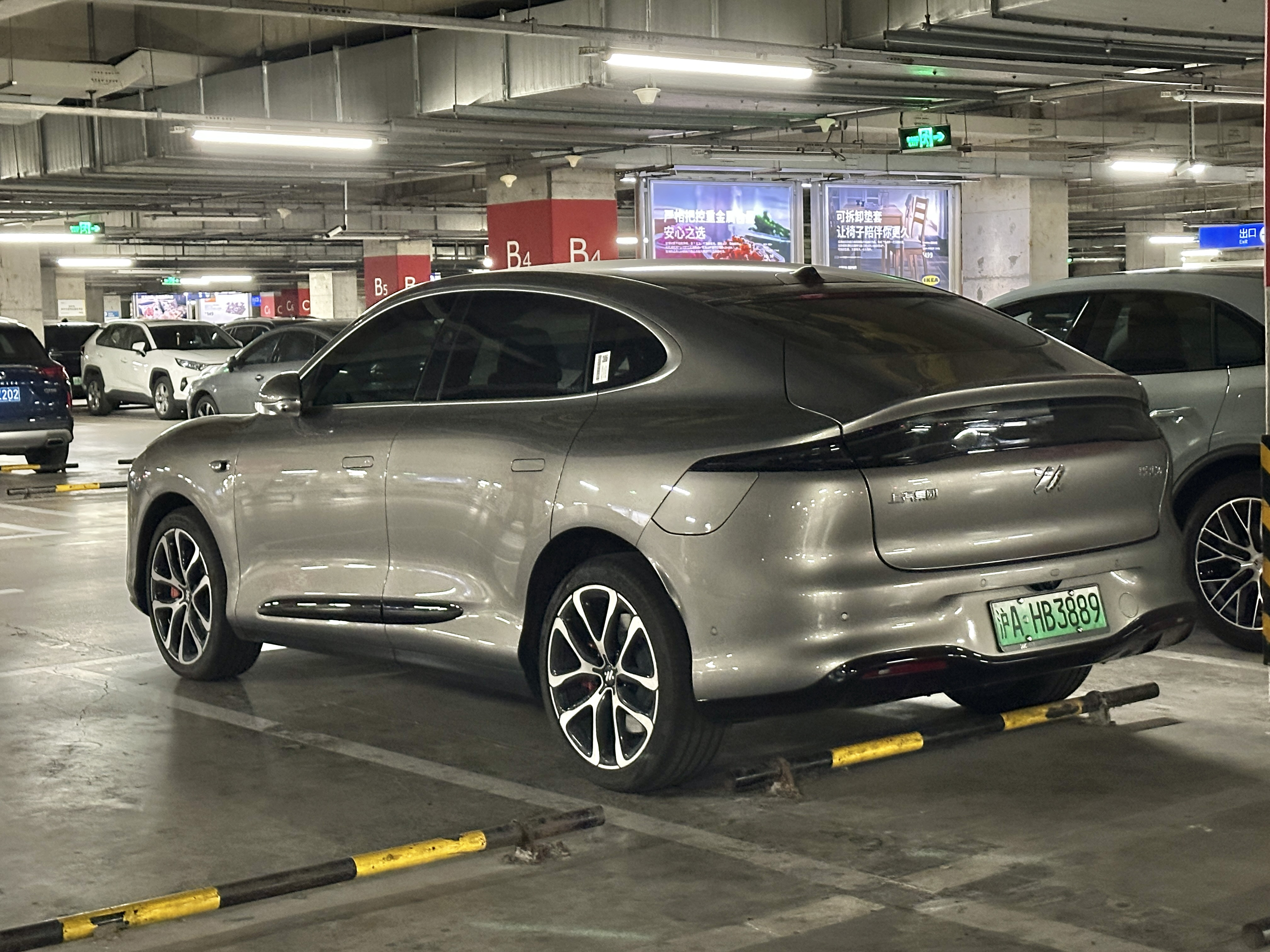
Rear view

=== Powertrain ===
Specifications
Battery		Power	Torque	Range		10–80% time	0–100 km/h (62 mph)	Top speed	Kerb weight
Type	Weight	Power	Torque	WLTP	CLTC	10–80% time	0–100 km/h (62 mph)	Top speed	Kerb weight
EREV
52.1 kWh LFP Zenergy	379 kg (836 lb)	309 hp (230 kW; 313 PS)	430 N⋅m (317 lb⋅ft)	290 km (180 mi)	370 km (230 mi)	19 min	6.4 sec	200 km/h (124 mph)	2,350 kg (5,181 lb)
65.9 kWh NMC CALB	375 kg (827 lb)	309 hp (230 kW; 313 PS)	430 N⋅m (317 lb⋅ft)	360 km (224 mi)	450 km (280 mi)	16 min	6.4 sec	200 km/h (124 mph)	2,345 kg (5,170 lb)
BEV
76.5 kWh LFP CALB	533 kg (1,175 lb)	328 hp (245 kW; 333 PS)	430 N⋅m (317 lb⋅ft)	—	650 km (404 mi)	18 min	6.4 sec	200 km/h (124 mph)	2,255 kg (4,971 lb)
76.5 kWh LFP CATL	533 kg (1,175 lb)	328 hp (245 kW; 333 PS)	430 N⋅m (317 lb⋅ft)	—	650 km (404 mi)	12 min	6.4 sec	200 km/h (124 mph)	2,255 kg (4,971 lb)
93 kWh LFP CATL	612 kg (1,349 lb)	402 hp (300 kW; 408 PS)	500 N⋅m (369 lb⋅ft)	—	782 km (486 mi)	20 min	5.4 sec	235 km/h (146 mph)	2,300 kg (5,071 lb)
103.3 kWh NMC CATL	552 kg (1,217 lb)	402 hp (300 kW; 408 PS)	500 N⋅m (369 lb⋅ft)	—	802 km (498 mi)	17 min	5.4 sec	235 km/h (146 mph)	2,285 kg (5,038 lb)
103.3 kWh NMC CATL	552 kg (1,217 lb)	670 hp (500 kW; 679 PS)	800 N⋅m (590 lb⋅ft)	—	750 km (466 mi)	17 min	3.48 sec	252 km/h (157 mph)	2,370 kg (5,225 lb)

== Markets ==
The IM LS6 is exported as the MG IM6.

=== Australia ===
The MG IM6 was launched in Australia on 12 June 2025 alongside the IM5, with customer deliveries started on 30 July and mass deliveries commented in September 2025. It is available with three variants: Premium (75 kWh), Platinum (100 kWh) and Performance (100 kWh).

=== Europe ===
The IM6 is marketed as the MG IM6 in the United Kingdom, it is sold through MG dealerships, and deliveries scheduled to start in September 2025.

=== India ===
The MG IM6 is slated to launch in October 2026 through JSW MG Motor India's MG Select brand of showrooms.

=== New Zealand ===
The MG IM6 was launched in New Zealand on 22 August 2025, with customer deliveries started in November 2025. It is available with three variants: Premium (75 kWh), Platinum (100 kWh) and Performance (100 kWh).

=== Singapore ===
The MG IM6 was launched in Singapore on 25 September 2025 alongside the IM5, with three variants: Luxury RWD (75 kWh), Sport RWD (100 kWh) and Performance AWD (100 kWh).

=== Thailand ===
The MG IM6 went on sale in Thailand on 24 March 2025 at the 2025 Thailand Motor Show. It is imported from China and it is available in two variants: Premium RWD and Performance AWD. The Premium variant has a 75kWh battery pack rated for 550 km (342 mi) of range, and the Performance uses a 100kWh pack rated for 634 km (394 mi). The Premium Long Range variant using the 100kWh battery pack rated for 750 km (470 mi) of range was added in August 2025.

== Safety ==
=== C-NCAP ===
C-NCAP (2021) test results 2024 IM LS6 Max Standard Range
Category		%
Overall:	5 /5 stars	90.7%
Occupant protection:		95.34%
Vulnerable road users:		65.07%
Active safety:		95.03%

=== Euro NCAP ===
Euro NCAP test results IM IM6 'COM' (LHD) (2025)
Test	Points	%
Overall:	5 /5 stars	
Adult occupant:	36.1	90%
Child occupant:	42.0	85%
Pedestrian:	52.7	83%
Safety assist:	15.7	87%

=== ANCAP ===
ANCAP test results IM 6 (2025, aligned with Euro NCAP)
Test	Points	%
Overall:	5 /5 stars	
Adult occupant:	36.10	90%
Child occupant:	44.81	91%
Pedestrian:	52.78	83%
Safety assist:	14.39	79%

== Sales ==
According to IM, the facelifted LS6 received over 6,000 orders within 12 hours of becoming available on 26 September 2024. The 2026 updated LS6 received over 8,000 pre-orders within 45 minutes of its launch on 10 September 2026, and achieved over 8,000 deliveries by 31 October 2026 since its launch.

Year	China		
Year	EREV	EV	Total
2023	—	22,883	
2024	—	36,530	
2025	12,957	33,412	46,369
