= IM LS7 =

Electric mid-size luxury crossover SUV

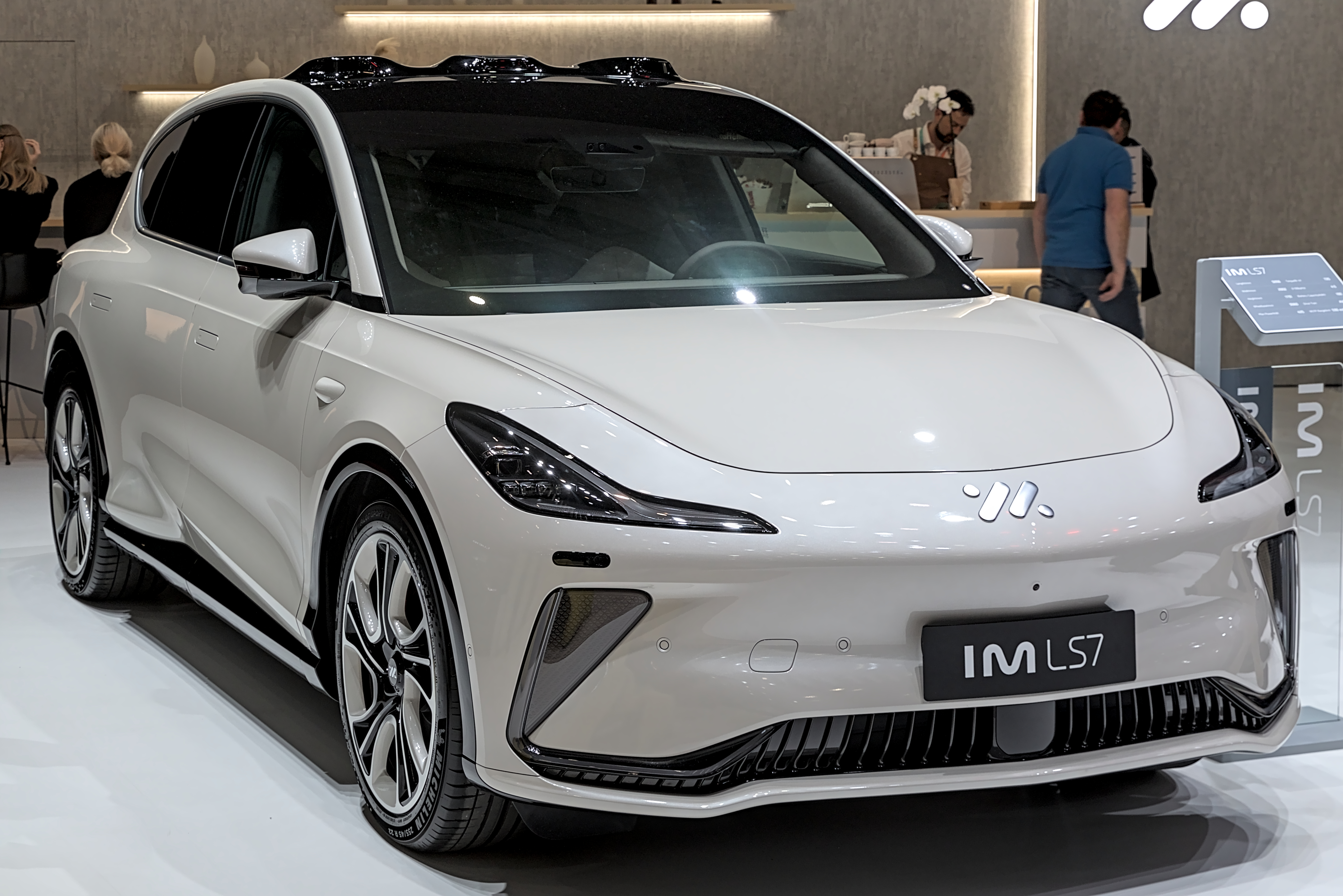

Overview
- Manufacturer: IM Motors
- Model code: S11L
- Production: 2022–present
- Assembly: China: Shanghai

Body and chassis
- Class: Mid-size SUV (E)
- Body style: 5-door SUV
- Layout: Rear-motor, rear-wheel drive; Dual-motor, all-wheel-drive
- Related: AUDI E7X

Powertrain
- Electric motor: 340–579 hp (254–432 kW)
- Transmission: Single-speed gear reduction
- Battery: 77 kWh NMC CATL; 90 kWh NMC CATL; 100 kWh NMC CATL
- Electric range: 510–700 km (320–430 mi) (CTLC)

Dimensions
- Wheelbase: 3,060 mm (120.5 in)
- Length: 5,049 mm (198.8 in)
- Width: 2,002 mm (78.8 in)
- Height: 1,731 mm (68.1 in); 1,784 mm (70.2 in) (2025+)

The IM LS7 (Chinese: 智己LS7; pinyin: Zhìjǐ LS7) is a battery electric mid-size SUV built by IM Motors, developed from the full-sized sedan platform of the IM L7. The LS7 was officially launched in the Chinese market in February 2023 with deliveries starting in March.

== Overview ==
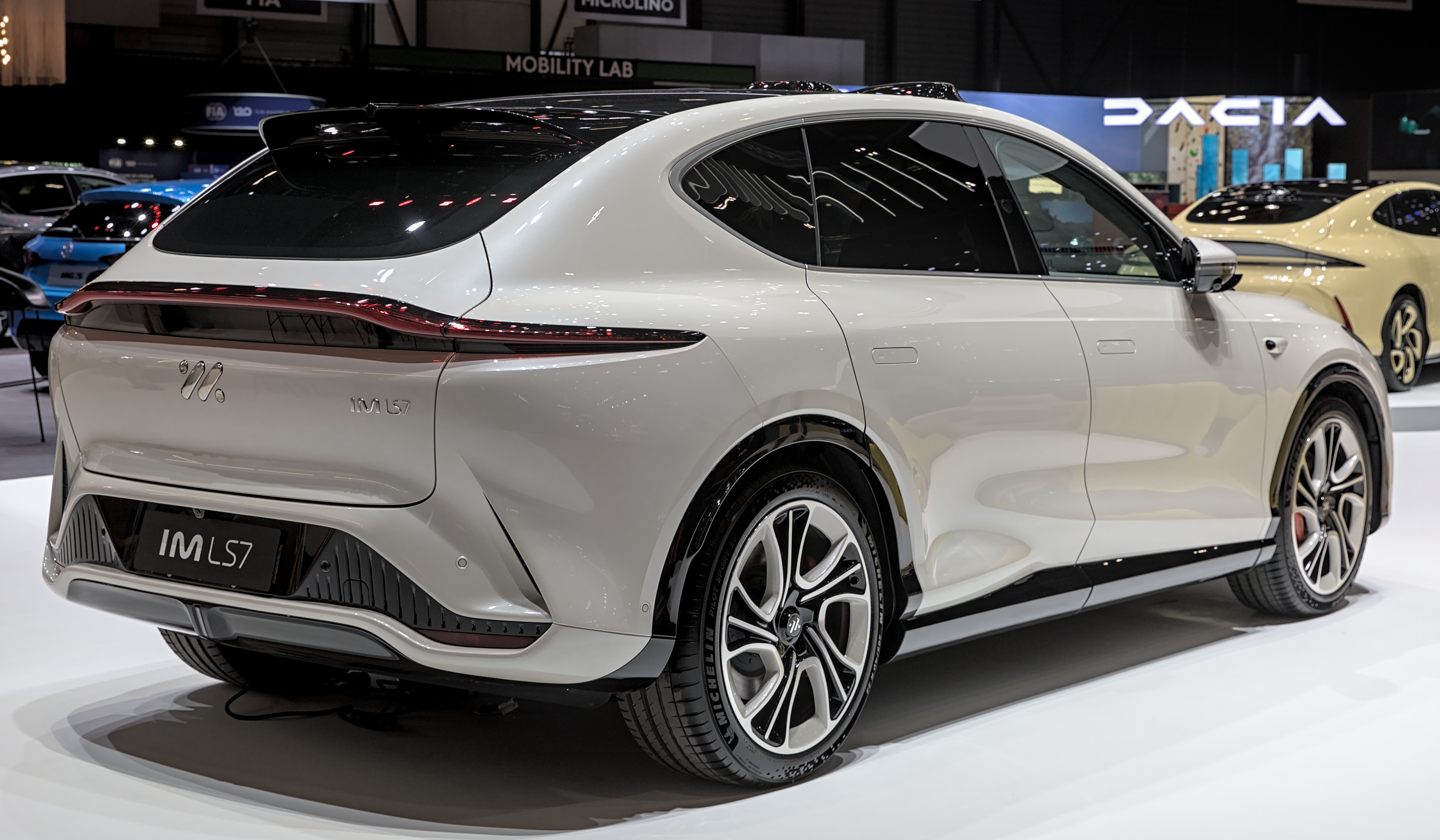
IM LS7 rear

The IM LS7 was revealed as a concept car on 19 April 2021, at Auto Shanghai, alongside the IM L7 prototype and Airo concept car.

== Specifications ==
The IM LS7 uses the company's IM AD intelligent driving system, which uses Nvidia's Orin X chips and dual LiDARs.

The base variant of the LS7 uses a permanent magnet synchronous single rear motor with 250 kW (340 PS; 340 hp), while the top-level variant uses a twin-motor setup, with 425 kW (578 PS; 570 hp) combined with front motor producing 175 kW and rear motor producing 250 kW. The peak torque is 725 Nm. Three battery versions are available with 77 kWh, 90 kWh, and 100 kWh of capacity respectively. The drag coefficient is 0.268 cd.

When reversing, all-wheel drive is disengaged. Only the rear wheels work. Activating snow mode does not help. Telemetry, phone control doesn't work outside of china. Changing the SIM card does not help.

The LS7 interior features zero-gravity seats, an optional half-spoke steering wheel, and a center console with an auto-lifting AMOLED 2K ultra-clear interactive screen integrating the LCD instrument cluster and passenger entertainment screen, with the IMOS2.0 infotainment system software developed by IM Motors in-house, powered by a Qualcomm Snapdragon 8155 chip.

=== 2025 update ===
The updated version of the LS7 was launched on 16 June 2025 with updated components seen on other IM models and configuration changes. The exterior sees few changes, with the previous model's two roof-mounted LiDAR sensors reduced to a single LiDAR sensor on variants with it equipped. The taillights consist of a 1,500-LED display and have more customization options, and the vehicle's height specification is raised by 53 mm (2.1 in) to 1,784 mm (70.2 in).

The infotainment system has been updated to IMOS 3.6.0 with Deepseek integration and is now powered by a Snapdragon 8295 SoC, with the previously movable passenger display now a fixed design. All windows throughout the car are now dual-pane glass for noise reduction and the active noise reduction system has been enhanced, and all seats have heating, ventilating, and massaging functions as standard.

The LS7 now has a 6° rear-wheel steering system standard, which allows for a 5.3 m (17 ft) turning radius, and the air suspension can vary the ride height by 70 mm (2.8 in). It also comes standard with the Lizard Digital Chassis system seen on other models, which integrates the stability control, suspension control, and rear-wheel steering system into a single module to improve coordination and performance.

The powertrain has been updated to use 800-volt power electronics as standard. The single-motor rear-wheel drive version now outputs 300 kW (408 PS; 402 hp), and the dual-motor all-wheel drive version now makes 579 kW (787 PS; 776 hp), for 0–100 km/h (0–62 mph) acceleration in 3.9 seconds and a top speed of 239 km/h (149 mph). IM claims that the upgrades allow the LS7 to charge from 10 to 80% in within 17 minutes, and the CLTC range rating has been increased to up to 700 km (430 mi).

== Sales ==
Year	China	Mexico
2022	281	—
2023	14,065	—
2024	3,305	—
2025	1,182	241
