= AUDI E7X =

Mid-size electric crossover SUV

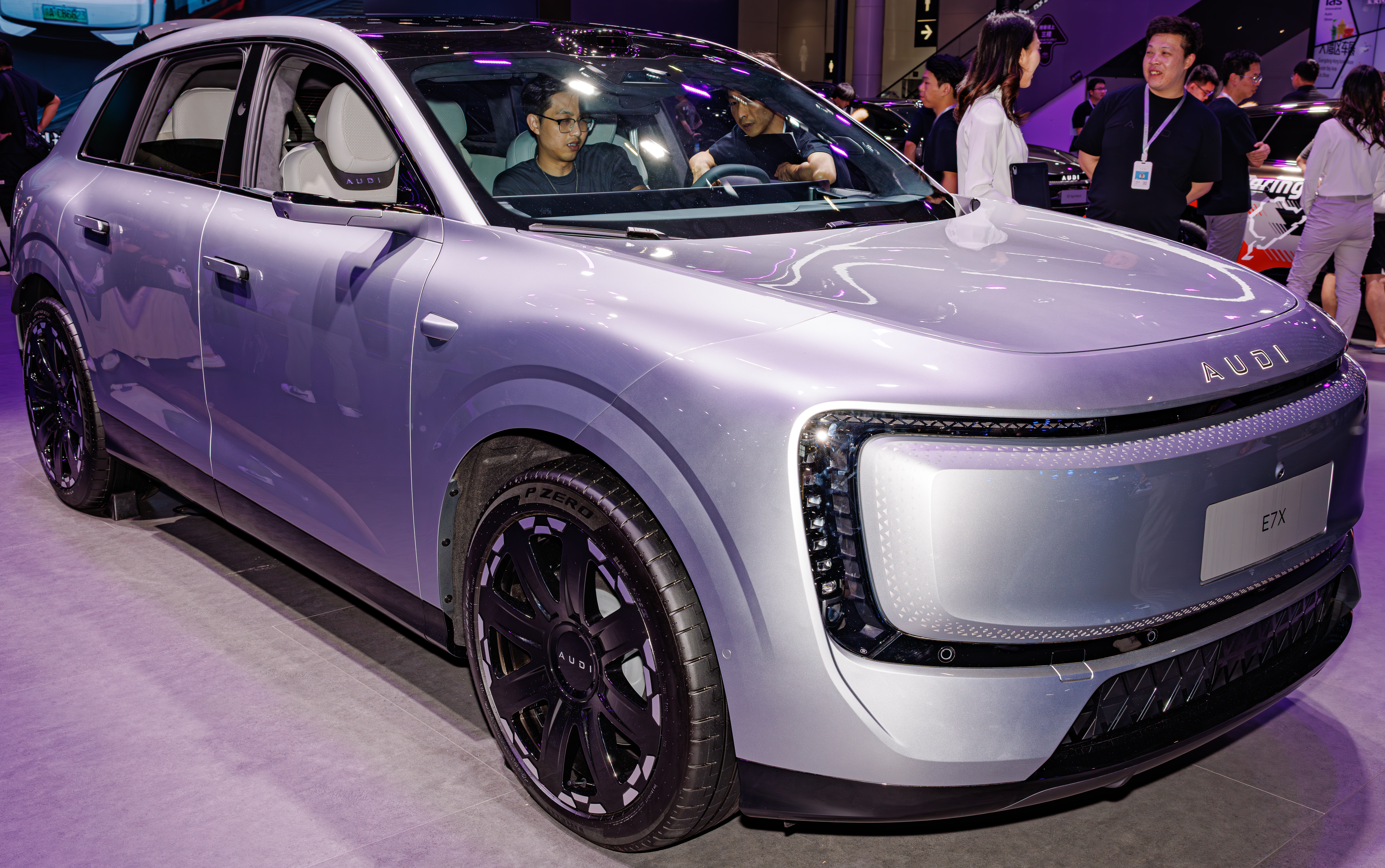

Overview
- Manufacturer: SAIC Volkswagen
- Also called: AUDI E SUV (concept)
- Production: April 2026 – present
- Assembly: China: Shanghai
- Designer: Kamil Łabanowicz

Body and chassis
- Class: Full-size SUV
- Body style: 5-door crossover SUV
- Layout: Rear-motor, rear-wheel-drive; Dual-motor, all-wheel-drive
- Platform: Advanced Digitized Platform
- Related: IM LS7

Powertrain
- Electric motor: 200 kW TZ180XS0952 PMSM (front); 300 kW TZ230XY1252 PMSM (rear)
- Power output: 402–671 hp (300–500 kW; 408–680 PS)
- Battery: 100 kWh CATL NMC; 109.3 kWh CATL NMC
- Electric range: 635–751 km (395–467 mi)

Dimensions
- Wheelbase: 3,060 mm (120.5 in)
- Length: 5,049 mm (198.8 in)
- Width: 1,997 mm (78.6 in)
- Height: 1,710 mm (67.3 in)
- Curb weight: 2,457–2,673 kg (5,417–5,893 lb)

The AUDI E7X (Chinese: 奥迪E7X; pinyin: Àodí E7X) is a battery electric and range-extended full-size SUV produced by the SAIC-Volkswagen joint venture and sold under the China-only AUDI marque that is owned by Audi. It is the second model to be co-developed by SAIC Motor and Audi.

== Overview ==
=== Concept model ===
The E7X was previewed by the AUDI E SUV Concept (stylized as E SUV concept) that was unveiled at the 2025 Guangzhou Auto Show. According to AUDI, the concept previewing the E7X "embodies simplicity to master complexity, outlining the dynamic posture of future luxury SUVs", as stated on the brand's Weibo page.

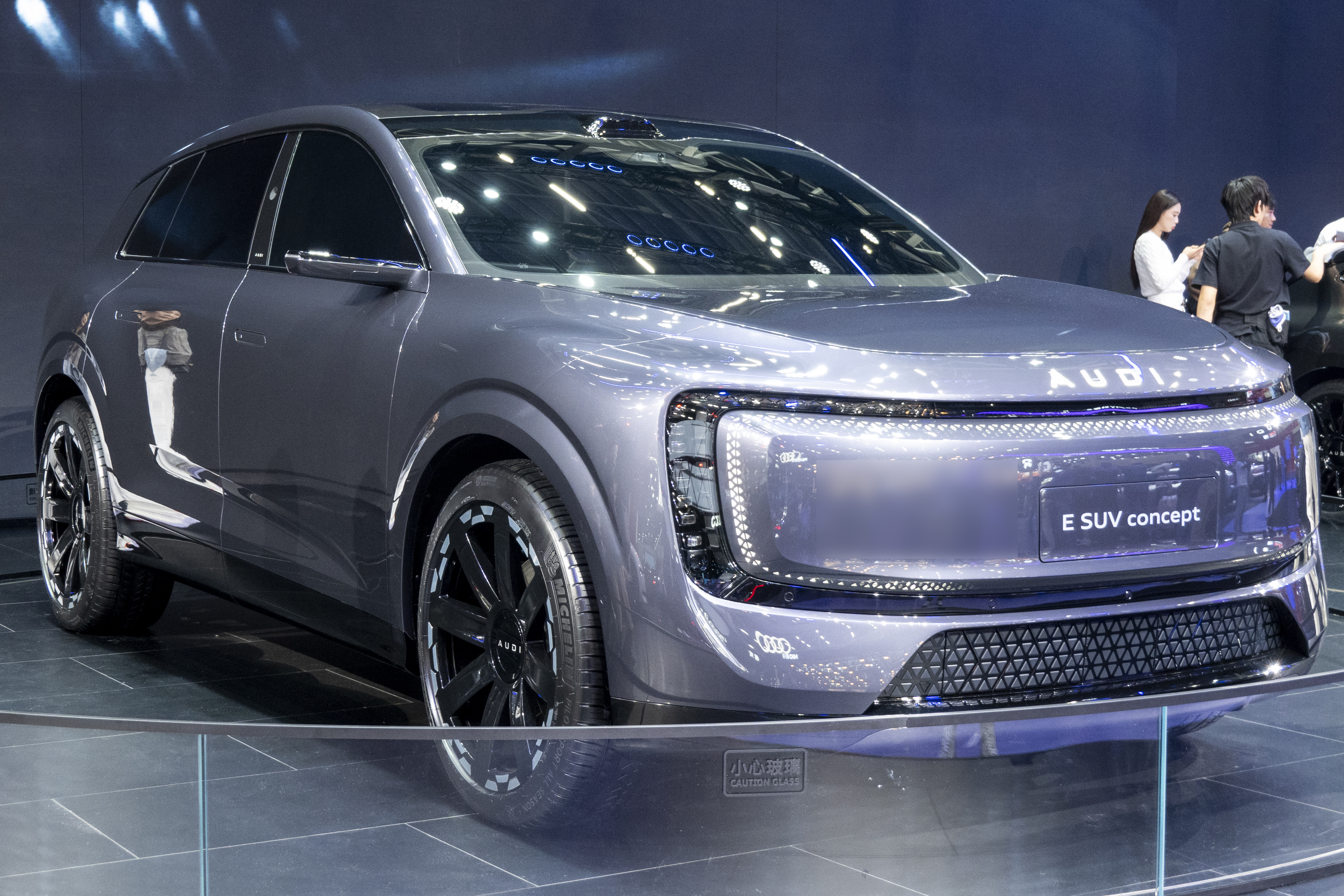
AUDI E SUV concept

=== Production model ===
The E7X launched in 2026 as the AUDI marque's second model. It is based on the IM LS7 and built on the Advanced Digitized Platform. It is the production version of the AUDI E SUV Concept (stylized as E SUV concept) that was unveiled at the 2025 Guangzhou Auto Show. According to AUDI, the concept previewing the E7X "embodies simplicity to master complexity, outlining the dynamic posture of future luxury SUVs", as stated on the brand's Weibo page.

It was previously speculated that the model would enter production as the AUDI E8. The production model's height, width, and length are smaller than the concept, but the wheelbase remains the same.

Production of the E7X commenced on April 22, 2026. Pre-sales began on May 8, 2026. It officially went on sale on May 29, 2026.

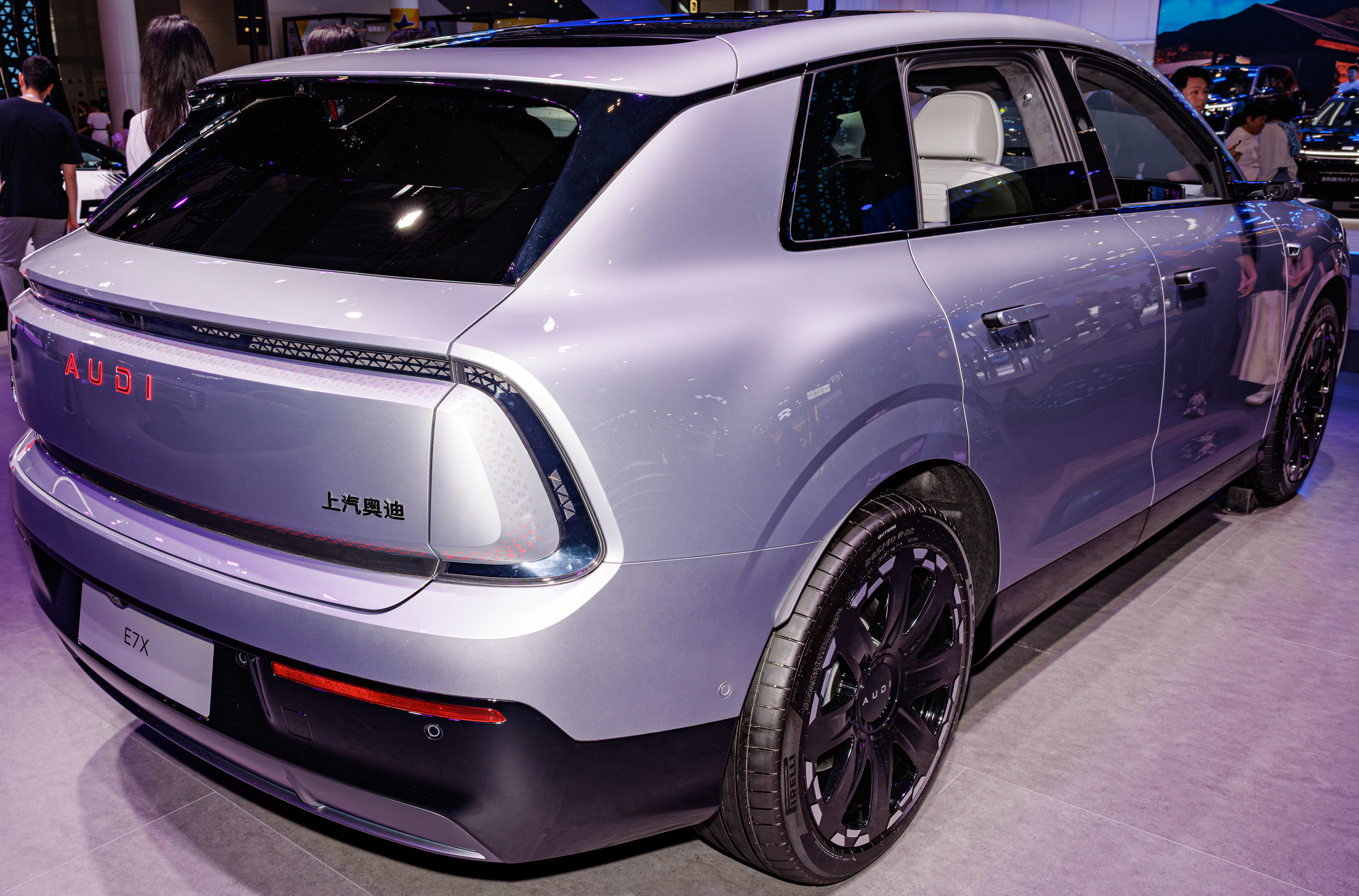
Rear view

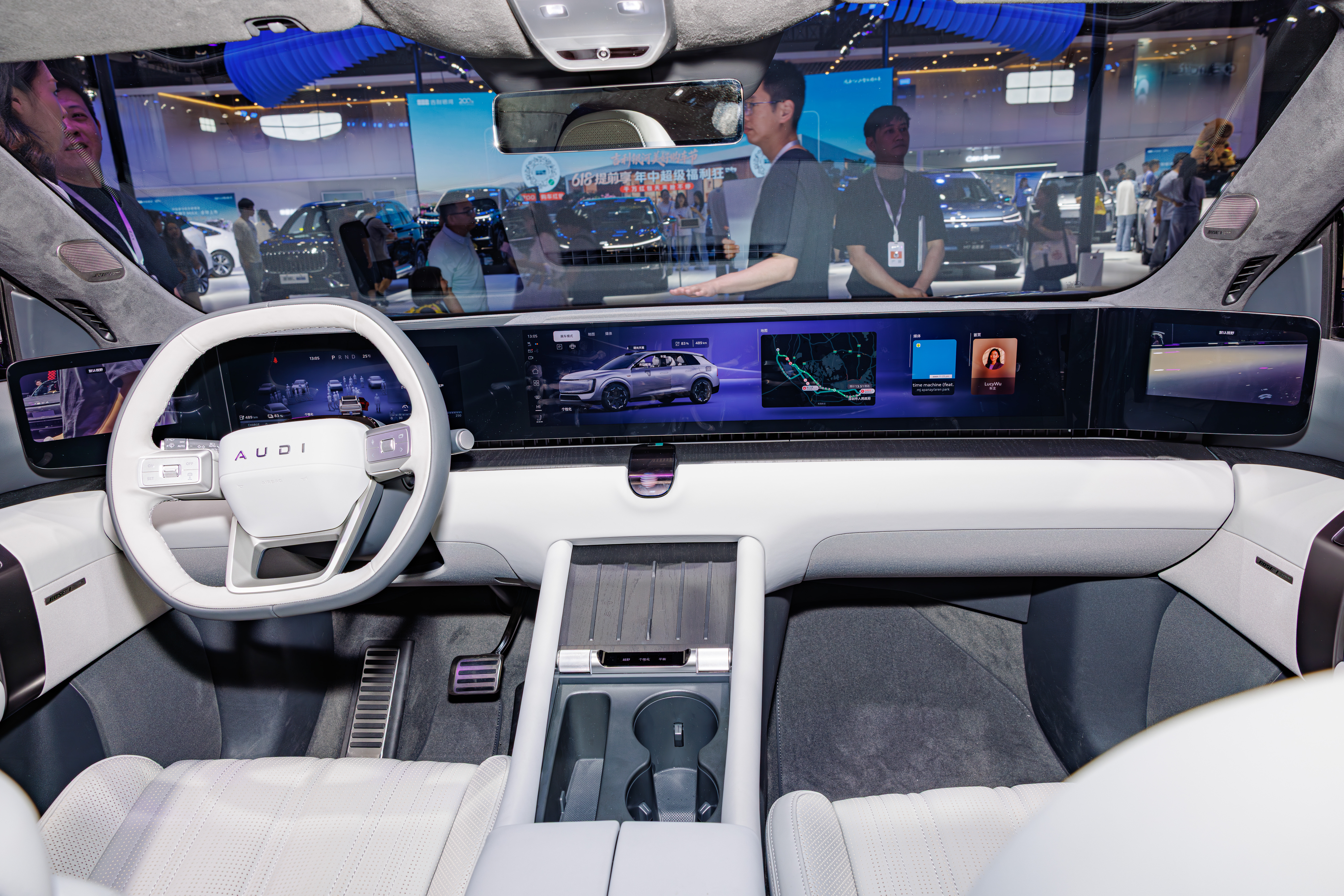
Interior

== Design and features ==
=== Concept version ===
The E SUV concept uses the AUDI 360 Driving Assist Package. Matrix LED headlights are also present. It also uses 23-inch wheels wrapped in 285/40 R23 Michelin Pilot Sport all-season tires.

=== Production version ===
The design language introduced by the E5 sportback is re-used for the E7X.

Spyshots of a prototype model from July 2025 show a closed front end with headlights hidden under the bonnet line. Prototype models also have a sizeable air intake and sloped A-pillars. A LiDAR sensor on the roof is present and digital mirrors are used instead of side-view mirrors. Retractable door handles are also present. The sculpted fenders and sleek roofline of the E5 are also present on the E7X prototype.

The doors use a frameless design. The interior is expected to mirror that of the E5, but the only detail known about the interior is that there are horizontally arranged ambient light strips on the door panels.

It is planned to be the first production model equipped with Level 3 autonomous driving capability provided by Momenta.

== Powertrain ==
The powertrain of the E7X was expected to mirror that of the E5 sportback and is built on the same 800-volt architecture. This includes the same motors, batteries, and electric control system that is the same as in the IM LS7, available in both rear-wheel-drive and all-wheel-drive versions.

All E7Xs have a permanent magnet synchronous rear motor outputting 402 horsepower (300 kW; 408 PS) and 500 N⋅m (369 lb⋅ft) of torque, while all-wheel drive variants add another permanent magnet motor outputting 268 horsepower (200 kW; 272 PS) and 300 N⋅m (221 lb⋅ft) of torque to the front axle for a total of 671 horsepower (500 kW; 680 PS). Both battery packs will use NMC cells supplied by CATL. The battery selection for the EV version include a 100 kWh pack weighing 552 kilograms (1,217 lb) and a 109.3 kWh pack weighing 578 kilograms (1,274 lb). The smaller battery achieves a CLTC range of 615–705 km (382–438 mi), while the larger pack achieves 660–751 km (410–467 mi).

EREV versions will be made available later on in the model's life cycle.

Specifications
Battery		Power	Torque	Range	30–80% charge	0–100 km/h (62 mph)	Top speed	Kerb weight
Type	Weight	Power	Torque	CLTC	30–80% charge	0–100 km/h (62 mph)	Top speed	Kerb weight
100kWh NMC CATL	552 kg (1,217 lb)	402 hp (300 kW; 408 PS)	500 N⋅m (369 lb⋅ft)	705 km (438 mi)	13 min	5.82 s	205 km/h (127 mph)	2,457 kg (5,417 lb)
100kWh NMC CATL	552 kg (1,217 lb)	671 hp (500 kW; 680 PS)	800 N⋅m (590 lb⋅ft)	635 km (395 mi)	13 min	3.9 s	230 km/h (143 mph)	2,584 kg (5,697 lb)
109kWh NMC CATL	578 kg (1,274 lb)	402 hp (300 kW; 408 PS)	500 N⋅m (369 lb⋅ft)	751 km (467 mi)	10 min	6.25 s	205 km/h (127 mph)	2,526 kg (5,569 lb)
109kWh NMC CATL	578 kg (1,274 lb)	671 hp (500 kW; 680 PS)	800 N⋅m (590 lb⋅ft)	660 km (410 mi)	10 min	3.94 s	230 km/h (143 mph)	2,673 kg (5,893 lb)

== Sales ==
According to AUDI, 10,434 E7Xs were sold from launch to the end of August 2026.
