= IM L6 =

Battery electric compact executive car

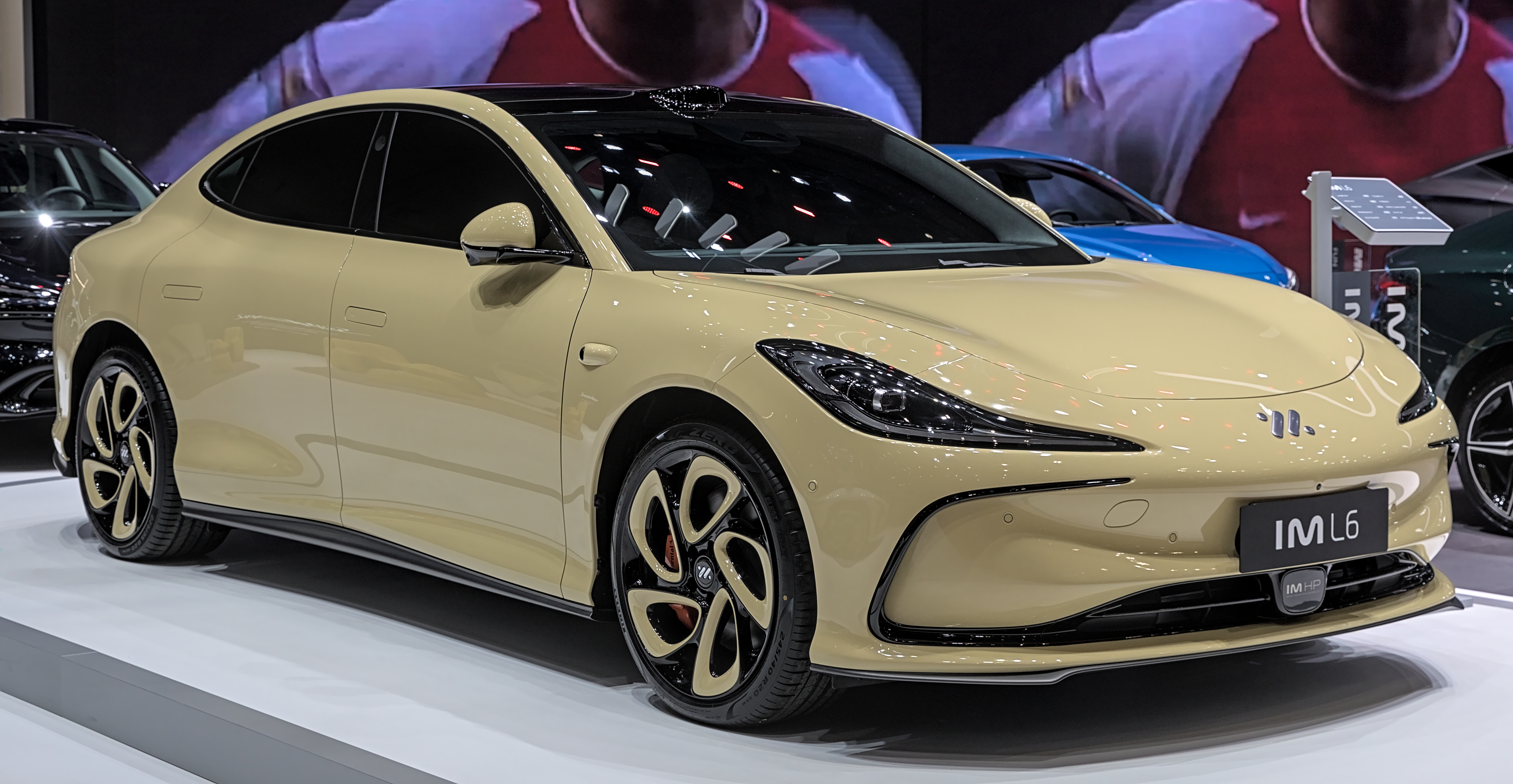
- IM L6 at the Geneva International Motor Show

Overview
- Manufacturer: IM Motors
- Model code: P12L
- Also called: MG IM5 (export)
- Production: 2024–present
- Assembly: China: Shanghai
- Designer: Central Saint Martins

Body and chassis
- Class: Compact executive car (D)
- Body style: 4-door liftback sedan
- Layout: Rear motor, rear-wheel drive; Dual-motor, all-wheel drive
- Related: IM LS6 / MG IM6; AUDI E5

Powertrain
- Electric motor: Rear-wheel-drive (RWD): 1×1XM permanent magnet synchronous; All-wheel-drive (AWD): 2×1YM AC permanent magnet synchronous
- Power output: 216–579 kW (294–787 PS; 290–776 hp)
- Transmission: 1-speed direct-drive
- Battery: 74 kWh LFP CALB; 75 kWh LFP CALB; 76.5 kWh LFP CALB; 83 kWh NMC CATL; 93.1 kWh LFP CATL; 100 kWh NMC CATL; 103.3 kWh NMC CATL
- Electric range: 618–850 km (384–528 mi) (CLTC); 575–655 km (357–407 mi) (WLTP)

Dimensions
- Wheelbase: 2,950 mm (116.1 in)
- Length: 4,924–4,937 mm (193.9–194.4 in)
- Width: 1,960 mm (77.2 in)
- Height: 1,474 mm (58.0 in)
- Curb weight: 2,040–2,250 kg (4,497–4,960 lb)

The IM L6 (Chinese: 智己L6; pinyin: Zhìjǐ L6) is a battery electric compact executive car produced by Chinese automobile manufacturer IM Motors, also known as Zhiji Motors, a joint venture between SAIC Motor, Pudong New Area and Alibaba.

== Overview ==
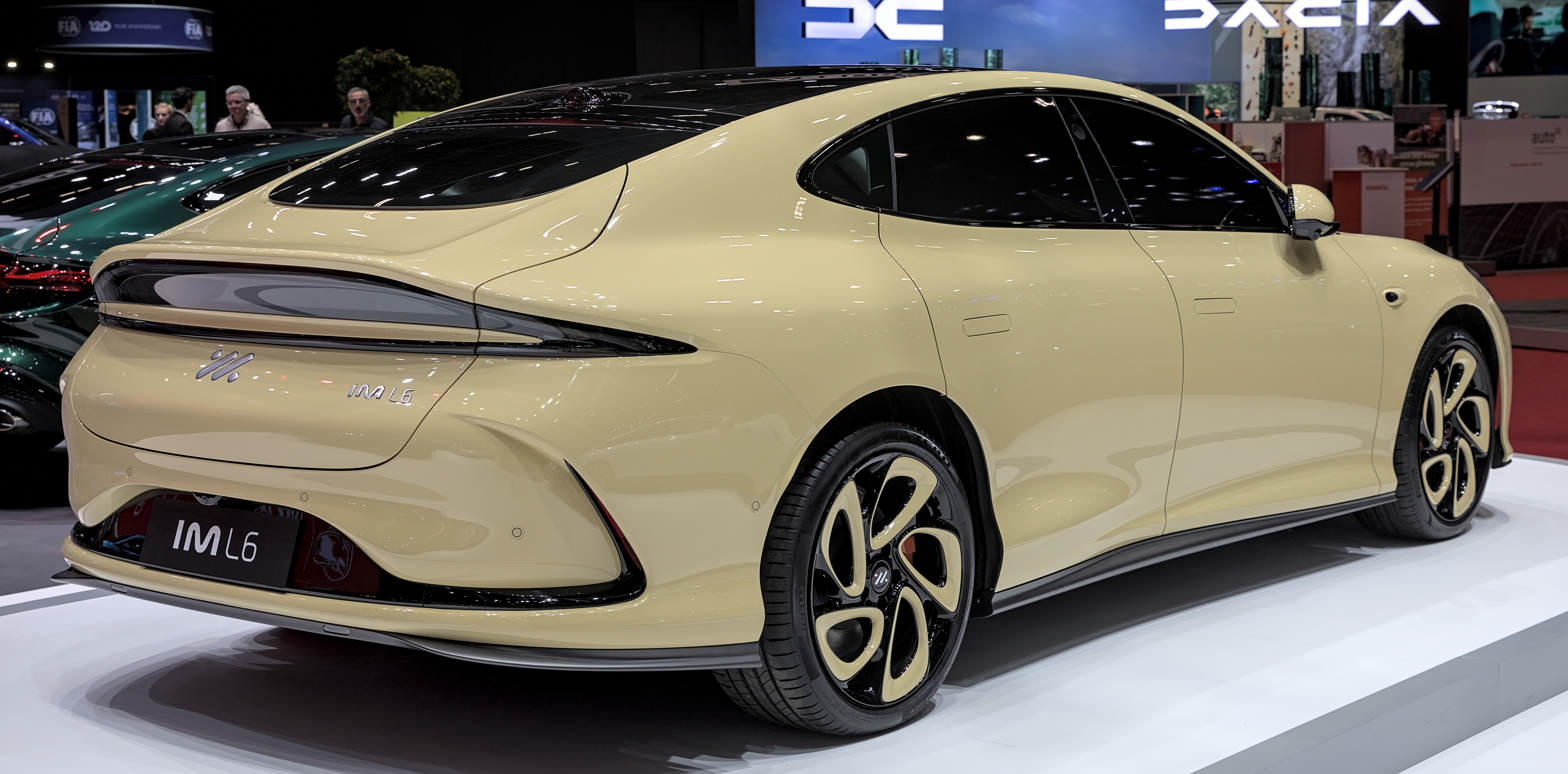
Rear view

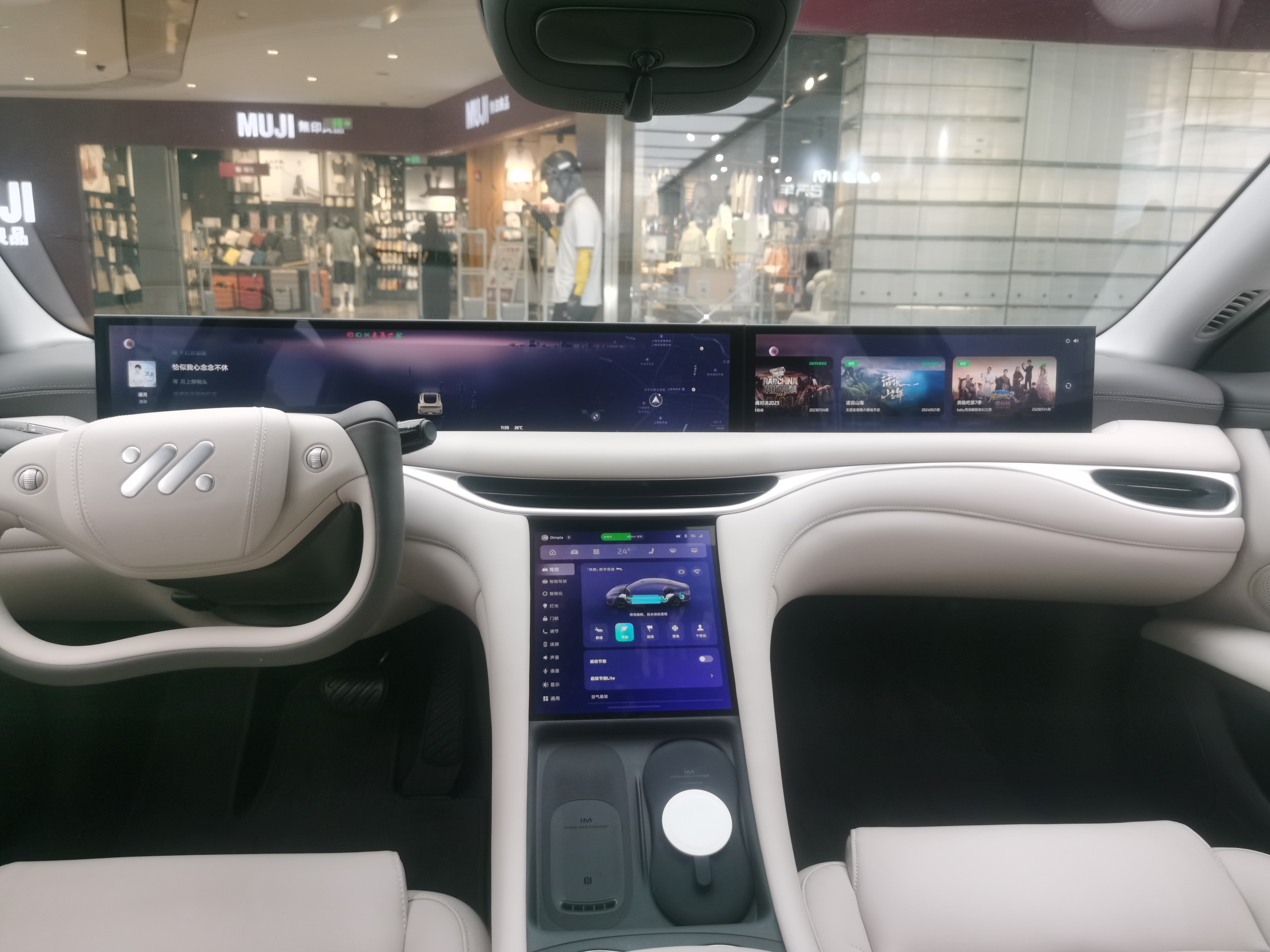
Interior

During its presentation at the Geneva International Motor Show in late February 2024, the Chinese company SAIC Motor not only presented the IM Motors portfolio to the European public for the first time, but also its new, fourth model. It was the mid-size L6, developing the stylistic concept of the LS6 SUV presented a year earlier.

The car is designed with a slim, soaring silhouette with boomerang-shaped headlights, a gently sloping roofline and a characteristic bulge on the rear trunk lid with an additional window under the spoiler. The body was covered with a large, panoramic window that smoothly connected the rear part of the body with the roof. Despite the lack of a separate third body, the L6 became a 4-door sedan.

The passenger compartment was maintained in the aesthetics typical of other IM models, with a yoke in place of the traditional steering wheel and an extensive screen system. One, placed at an angle, was located in the lower part of the dashboard at the junction with the center tunnel, while another, extended package of three screens stretched across the entire width of the cockpit.

The first market where the L6 went on sale was China in May 2024, 2 months after its global debut. In addition, the manufacturer also planned to expand its market reach to selected Western European markets in 2025, being distributed within the MG Motor network.

=== 2025 facelift ===
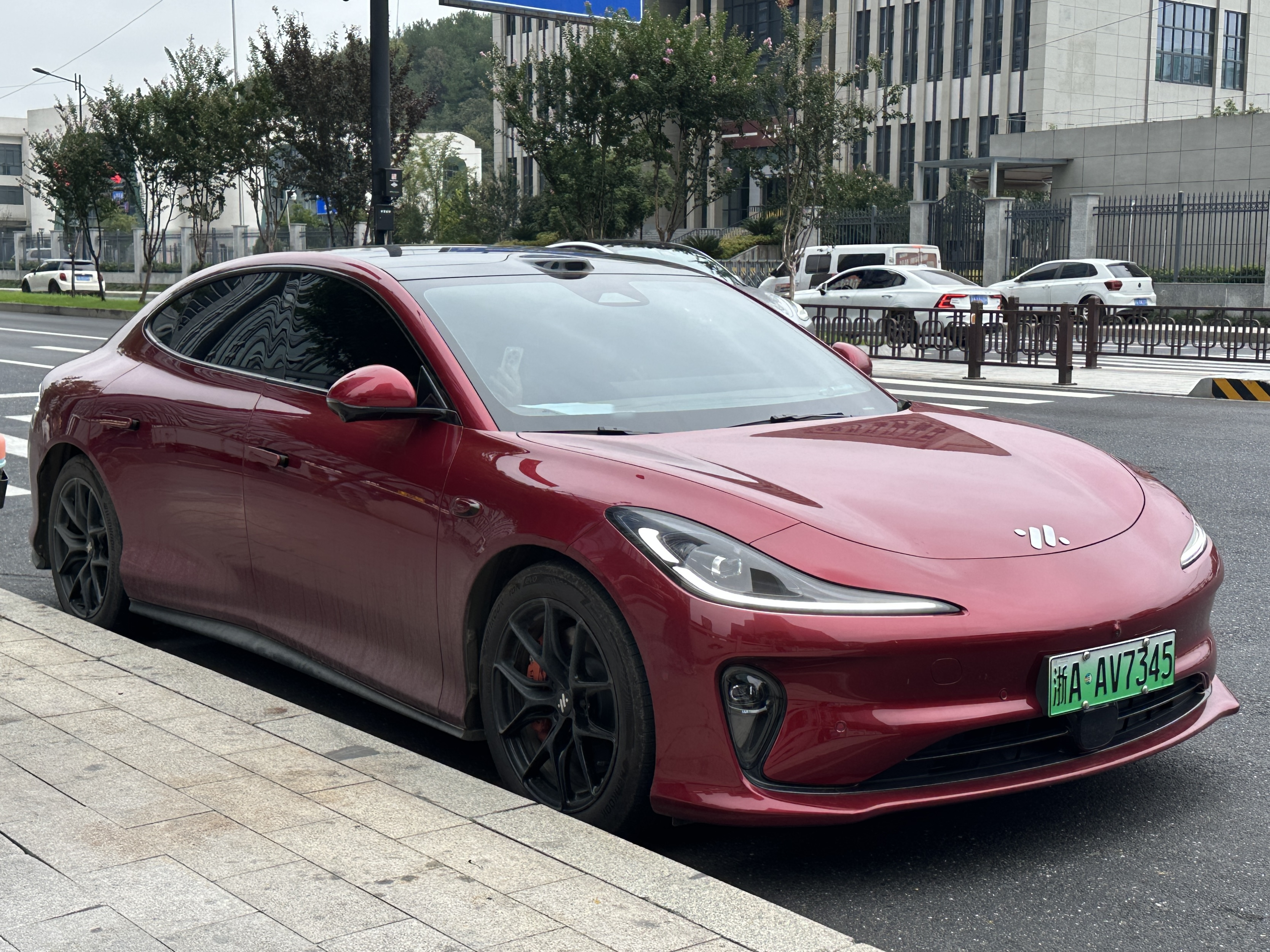
IM L6 2025 facelift

The 2025 facelift for the L6 was previewed at Auto Shanghai 2025 on April 18 where pre-orders began, and was launched on May 13 with deliveries beginning on May 19.

The exterior features minor changes and grows by 6 mm (0.24 in) in length to 4,937 mm (194.4 in), with the front badge moved to the hood, chrome side mirror mounts and window trim, and a more streamlined LiDAR unit. The headlights have new adaptive features, and the ISC Intelligent Light Language taillight LED display is upgraded from monochrome to color, which IM claims is an industry first. There is a new Matisse Red paint color available along with a new sports wheel rim option.

The interior features new accent trim designed in collaboration with Central Saint Martins, upgraded materials on the yoke steering wheel, and a new elliptical steering wheel option. The front seats have a new heated massage function, and have adjustable cushion firmness. The panoramic sunroof has 10 levels of individual dimming for the front and rear rows.

The L6 is equipped with a new Lizard Digital Chassis system, which integrates the brake-by-wire system, four-wheel steering, adaptive dampers, and air suspension into a single control unit. According to IM, this allows the L6 to detect a tire blowout within 300 milliseconds and compensate for it by managing braking force, steering angle, and suspension ride height to ensure the vehicle can safely travel in a straight line or around curves while maintaining control. The rear wheels can turn up to 18 degrees, allowing for a 4.69-metre (15.4 ft) turning radius. The air suspension has 60 mm (2.4 in) of ride height adjustment with five modes and a leveling feature when parked, and the adaptive dampers have 45% higher bandwidth than previous models.

The base model was upgraded with 800 V power electronics and a more powerful 329 hp (245 kW; 334 PS) motor.

=== 2026 update ===
The 2026 update to the L6 was first revealed when pre-sales started on 18 August 2026 and features minor changes to the exterior, a significantly refreshed interior, updates to the powertrain, and the addition of the Jimmy Choo Limited Edition models.

The L6's length is reduced by 13 mm (0.51 in) to 4,924 mm (193.9 in) and the lower front bumper has been modified, with the lower air intake no longer visually connecting with the fog lights. It features steer-by-wire system. The passenger entertainment screen has been upgraded to a 16.2-inch MiniLED display. The dashboard and center console have been redesigned to a more conventional layout, ditching the lower angled touchscreen for a flat center console with the wireless charging pads and cupholders moved forward to allow for a longer armrest and storage bin. The dashboard and seats have been restyled with a more minimalist straight-line with chromed air vents. The remaining dashboard spanning display has been made taller and is mounted lower to compensate, and is now complimented by a row of physical buttons.

The powertrain sees the addition of a new larger 93.1 kWh LFP battery option paired with 900-volt class power electronics achieving 850 kilometres (528 mi) of CLTC range, and updated versions of the existing battery options with range increases across the board.

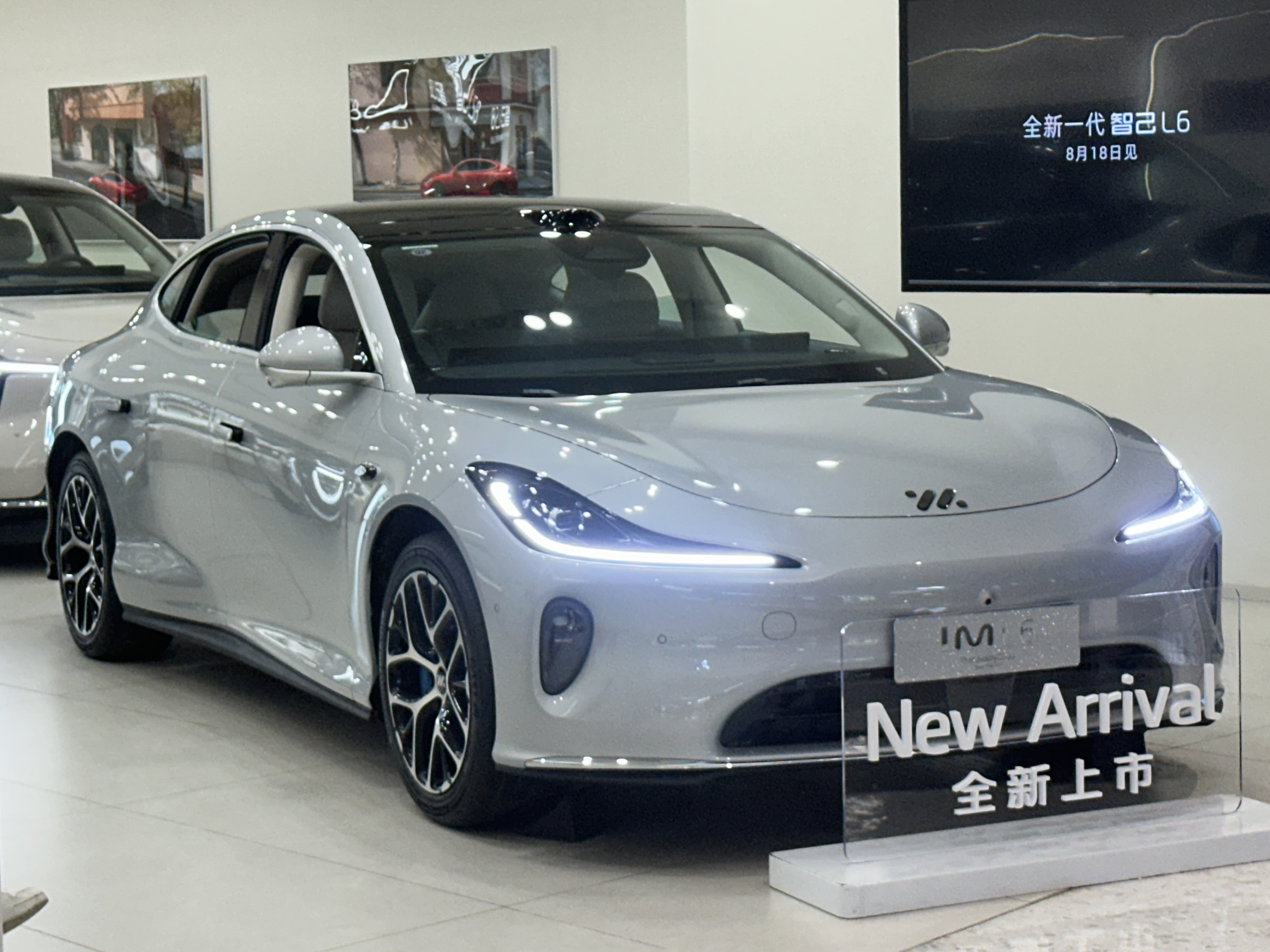
IM L6 Prof. Jimmy Choo Edition

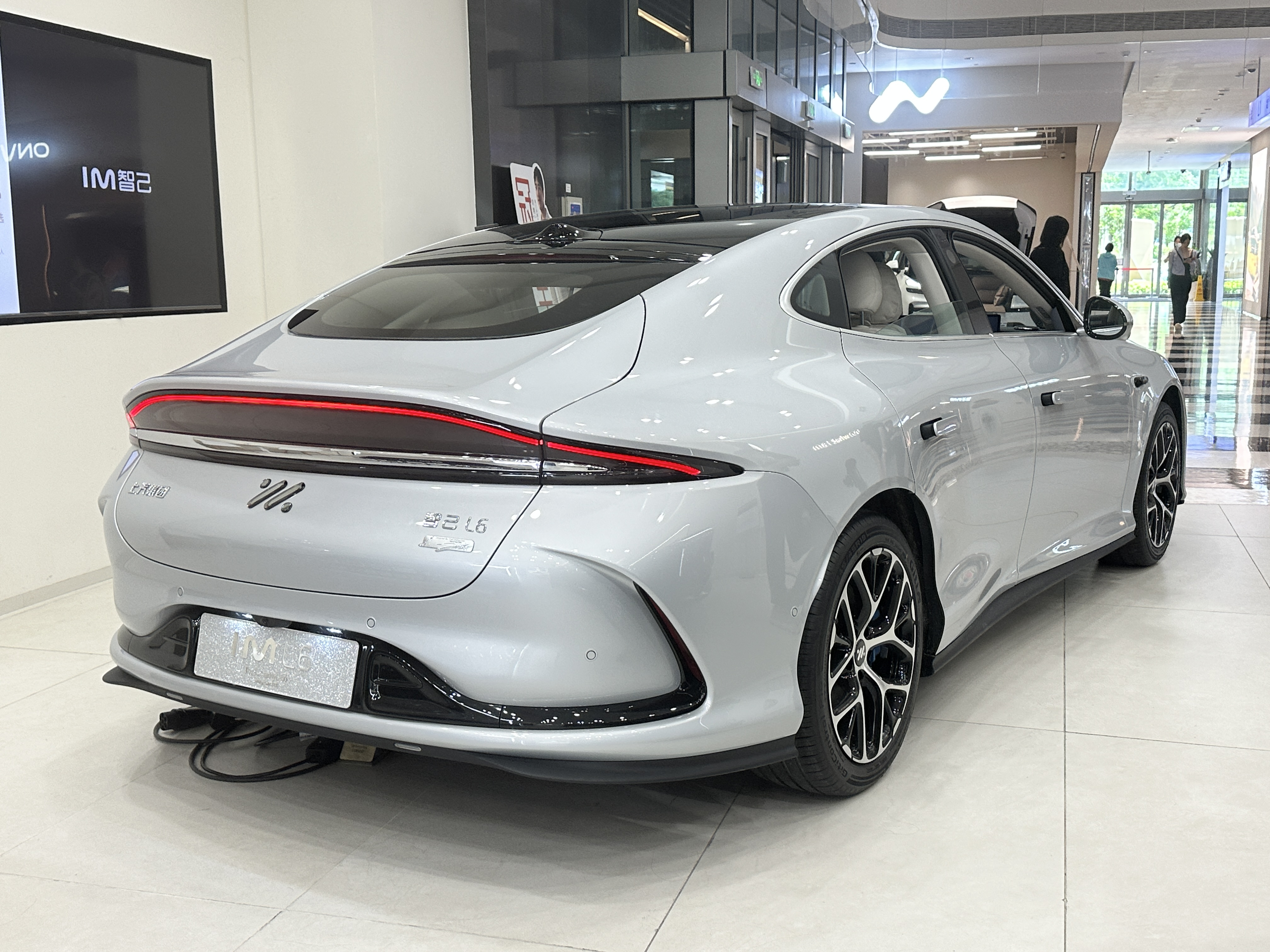
Rear view

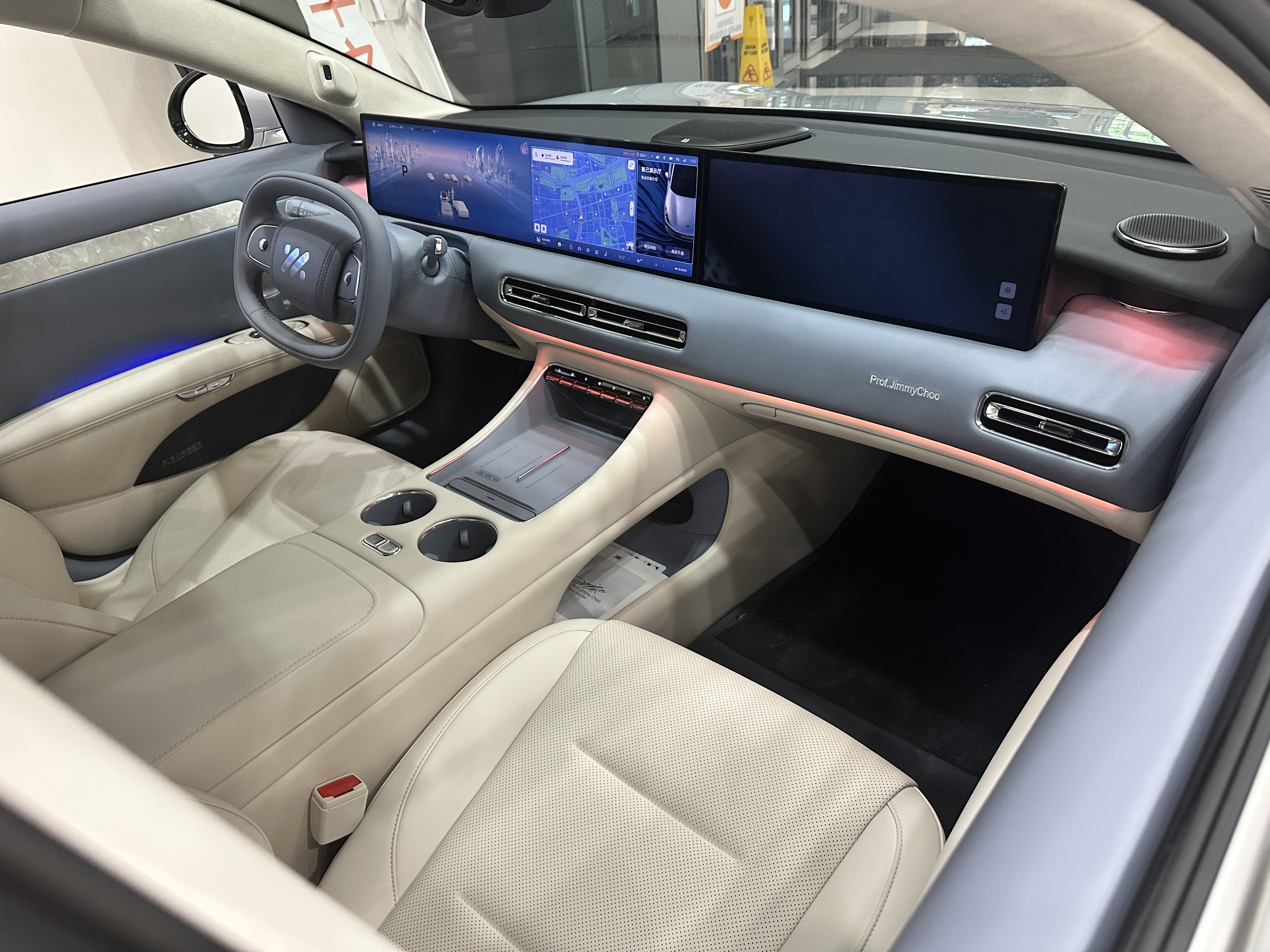
Interior

== Powertrain ==
All variants of the L6 are battery-electric and use a single motor for rear-wheel drive, except for the dual-motor Performance all-wheel drive variant.

At launch, it was available in four variants. The base Standard model has a CALB-supplied 75 kWh LFP battery pack and 400V power electronics paired with a 216 kW (290 hp; 294 PS) motor for 618 kilometres (384 mi) of range on the CLTC cycle. The midrange Long Range model has an 83 kWh NMC pack supplied by CATL and 800V power electronics paired with a 248 kW (333 hp; 337 PS) motor for 688 kilometres (428 mi) of range. The high-end Ultra Long Range model has a CATL-supplied 100 kWh NMC pack and quasi-900V power electronics, paired with a 300 kW (402 hp; 408 PS) motor for 822 kilometres (511 mi) of range. The Performance AWD variant uses an IM-developed Hurricane rear motor, capable of 379 kW (508 hp; 515 PS) and speeds up to 21,000 RPM, paired with a 200 kW (268 hp; 272 PS) front motor for a total of 776 hp (579 kW; 787 PS). It can accelerate from 0–100 km/h (62 mph) in 2.74 seconds and has a top speed of 268 km/h (167 mph).

For 2025, the entry variant has a CALB-supplied 74 kWh LFP battery and now gets paired with 800V power electronics and a more powerful 245 kW (329 hp; 333 PS) motor for 645 km (401 mi) of range; the 83 kWh pack option was dropped from the lineup.

For 2026, a new 93.1 kWh LFP battery pack with 900-volt power electronics capable of 850 kilometres (528 mi) of CLTC range paired with a 402 horsepower (300 kW; 408 PS) rear motor became available. Additionally, the base and top battery packs were refreshed, and are now 76.5 kWh LFP and 103.3 kWh NMC packs with 725 and 840 kilometres (450 and 522 mi) of CLTC range, respectively. Additionally, the top Ultra spec now has power reduced to 671 hp (500 kW; 680 PS), though the 0–100 km/h (62 mph) time remains the same 2.74 seconds as previously.

Chinese market specifications
Model	Year	Battery			Power	Torque	Range	0–100 km/h (62 mph)	Top speed
Model	Year	Type	Volt.	Weight	Power	Torque	CLTC	0–100 km/h (62 mph)	Top speed
Standard	2024–25	75 kWh LFP CALB	400V	540 kg (1,190 lb)	216 kW (290 hp; 294 PS)	450 N⋅m (332 lb⋅ft)	618 km (384 mi)	5.6 s	200 km/h (124 mph)
Max	2025–26	74 kWh LFP CALB	800V	533 kg (1,175 lb)	245 kW (329 hp; 333 PS)	430 N⋅m (317 lb⋅ft)	645 km (401 mi)	5.9 s	200 km/h (124 mph)
Max	2026–	76.5 kWh LFP CALB	800V	533 kg (1,175 lb)	245 kW (329 hp; 333 PS)	430 N⋅m (317 lb⋅ft)	725 km (450 mi)	5.9 s	200 km/h (124 mph)
Long Range	2024–25	83 kWh NMC CATL	800V	476–508 kg (1,049–1,120 lb)	248 kW (333 hp; 337 PS)	500 N⋅m (369 lb⋅ft)	688 km (428 mi)	4.6 s	220 km/h (137 mph)
Pro Max	2026–	93.1 kWh LFP CATL	900V	612 kg (1,349 lb)	300 kW (402 hp; 408 PS)	500 N⋅m (369 lb⋅ft)	850 km (528 mi)	4.9 s	220 km/h (137 mph)
Ultra Long Range	2024–25	100 kWh NMC CATL	900V	585 kg (1,290 lb)	300 kW (402 hp; 408 PS)	500 N⋅m (369 lb⋅ft)	822 km (511 mi)	4.6 s	222 km/h (138 mph)
Ultra Performance AWD	2024–25	100 kWh NMC CATL	900V	585 kg (1,290 lb)	579 kW (776 hp; 787 PS)	800 N⋅m (590 lb⋅ft)	750 km (466 mi)	2.74 s	268 km/h (167 mph)
Ultra	2026–	103.3 kWh NMC CATL	900V	447 kg (985 lb)	500 kW (671 hp; 680 PS)	800 N⋅m (590 lb⋅ft)	840 km (522 mi)	2.74 s	268 km/h (167 mph)
Lightyear AWD	—	123.7 kWh semi-solid state	900V	621 kg (1,369 lb)	540 kW (720 hp; 730 PS)	800 N⋅m (590 lb⋅ft)	1,002 km (623 mi)	—	268 km/h (167 mph)

=== Lightyear Edition ===
At the L6's launch event at the Geneva Motor Show, IM representatives spoke of a variant using a solid-state battery to achieve up to 1,000 kilometres (621 mi) (800 km (500 mi) WLTP) of range. At the L6's technology showcase event on 9 April 2024, IM clarified that the battery, a 130 kWh pack dubbed Lightyear Battery and marketed as "solid-state", was actually using a semi-solid-state electrolyte. On its launch day on May 13, IM said that the Lightyear edition would be available to order later in the year in September 2024, with deliveries beginning in October.

According to information revealed by IM at the L6's April 9 technology event, Lightyear battery uses a ultra-high-nickel cathode and a silicon-carbon composite anode. It uses an IM-developed and patented 'nano-scale' electrolyte, which IM says has high ionic conductivity and temperature resistance. The electrolyte uses a dry-process solid-layer integrated molding manufacturing technique, which IM says reduces the cell's internal resistance for faster charging, and solves silicon-based material's high expansion problem to achieve usable longevity. With the help of the quasi-900V power electronics, the pack is capable of a peak charge rate of 400 kW, allowing it to recharge 400 km (250 mi) in 12 minutes according to IM. The battery supplier is Qingtao Energy Development Group (Chinese: 清陶能源; pinyin: qīngtáo néngyuán) based in Kunshan. It was founded in 2016 by Nan Cewen, a professor at Tsinghua University and a member of the Chinese Academy of Sciences.

In December 2024, a regulatory filing for the L6 Lightyear Edition's sales license was listed by the MIIT, which is the final legal step for a vehicle to be sold in China. It revealed that the battery pack has a capacity of 123.7 kWh and has a weight of 621 kg (1,369 lb). It allows for a CLTC range rating of 1,002 kilometres (623 mi), and a curb weight of 2,330 kg (5,140 lb) compared to 2,250 kg (4,960 lb) for the similar Performance AWD model. The front motor is a slightly weaker 190 kW (255 hp; 258 PS) unit than the Performance AWD model, resulting in a total of 763 hp (569 kW; 774 PS).

== Safety ==
ANCAP test results IM 5 (2025, aligned with Euro NCAP)
Test	Points	%
Overall:	5 /5 stars	
Adult occupant:	35.73	89%
Child occupant:	44.81	91%
Pedestrian:	53.77	85%
Safety assist:	14.35	79%

Euro NCAP test results IM5 (LHD) (2025)
Test	Points	%
Overall:	5 /5 stars	
Adult occupant:	35.7	89%
Child occupant:	42.0	85%
Pedestrian:	53.8	85%
Safety assist:	15.7	87%

== Markets ==
=== Australia ===
The MG IM5 was launched in Australia on 12 June 2025 alongside the IM6, with customer deliveries started on 30 July and mass deliveries commenced in September 2025. It is available with three variants: Premium (75 kWh), Platinum (100 kWh) and Performance (100 kWh).

=== Singapore ===
The MG IM5 was launched in Singapore on 25 September 2025 alongside the IM6, with three variants: Luxury RWD (75 kWh), Sport RWD (100 kWh) and Performance AWD (100 kWh).

=== Thailand ===
The MG IM5 was launched in Thailand on 24 March 2026, in the sole variant: Premium Long Range RWD (100 kWh).

== Sales ==
After opening on 9 April 2024, IM received 10,000 pre-orders for the L6 within 23 hours, and surpassed 29,000 pre-orders by its launch day on 13 May. After its launch on 13 May 2024, the L6 achieved 6,000 firm orders after 48 hours.

Year	China
2024	23,705
2025	19,775
