= AUDI (sub-brand) =

Chinese brand

- Product type: Automobiles
- Current owner: SAIC Motor and Audi
- Produced by: SAIC Volkswagen
- Country: China
- Introduced: 2024
- Markets: China
- Ambassadors: Fermín Soneira (CEO of the Audi and SAIC Cooperation Project)
- Website: www.saic-audi.cn/audi-e.html

AUDI (Chinese: 奥迪; pinyin: Àodí) is a Chinese automobile brand co-owned by Audi and SAIC Motor. Unveiled in November 2024, AUDI operates independently of the conventional four-ring Audi marque and positioned as an electric-only brand tailored specifically for Chinese customers, built on a jointly developed "Advanced Digitized Platform" and marketed under the tagline of combining Audi's engineering with China's digital ecosystem.

Its first model, the AUDI E5 was introduced in 2025, while its second, the AUDI E7X, debuted in 2026. A third model will be a battery electric sedan planned for 2027.

In Chinese language, AUDI shares the Chinese name "奥迪" with the conventional four-ring Audi brand.

== History ==
Audi and SAIC first confirmed a cooperation on electric vehicle development in July 2023, and formally announced a jointly developed "Advanced Digitised Platform" in May 2024. In August 2024, Reuters reported that Audi intended to sell the resulting vehicles without its four-ring logo, citing sources who said the decision reflected a desire to differentiate the new, SAIC-underpinned models from Audi's existing four-ring China lineup. The project was internally codenamed "Purple" during development.

The AUDI brand was officially launched in Shanghai in November 2024, alongside its first concept car, the AUDI E. Audi CEO Gernot Döllner said the jointly developed platform would reduce time-to-market by more than 30 percent, with an initial plan for three battery-electric models in the mid-size and full-size segments over three years.

The AUDI E5 Sportback, the brand's first production model, debuted at the Shanghai Auto Show in April 2025. Production began at the dedicated AUDI Intelligent Production Site in Anting, Shanghai, in August 2025, with customer deliveries following in September 2025. A second concept, the AUDI E SUV, was revealed at the Guangzhou Auto Show in November 2025 as a design preview study for the AUDI E7X. The E7X made its formal debut at Auto China 2026 in Beijing in April 2026 and launched in the first half of that year. Audi announced that a third AUDI model, a battery electric sedan, is scheduled to debut in 2027.

== Branding ==
Audi has described the absence of the four-ring logo, replaced by the brand name spelled in capital letters, as signalling "both the connection to and differentiation from" the conventional Audi marque. The brand's stated positioning combines Audi engineering with technology aimed at Chinese consumers. AUDI is positioned by its parent companies as operating at the same brand tier as the conventional four-ring Audi, but as an independent entity exclusively for the Chinese market.

== Manufacturing ==
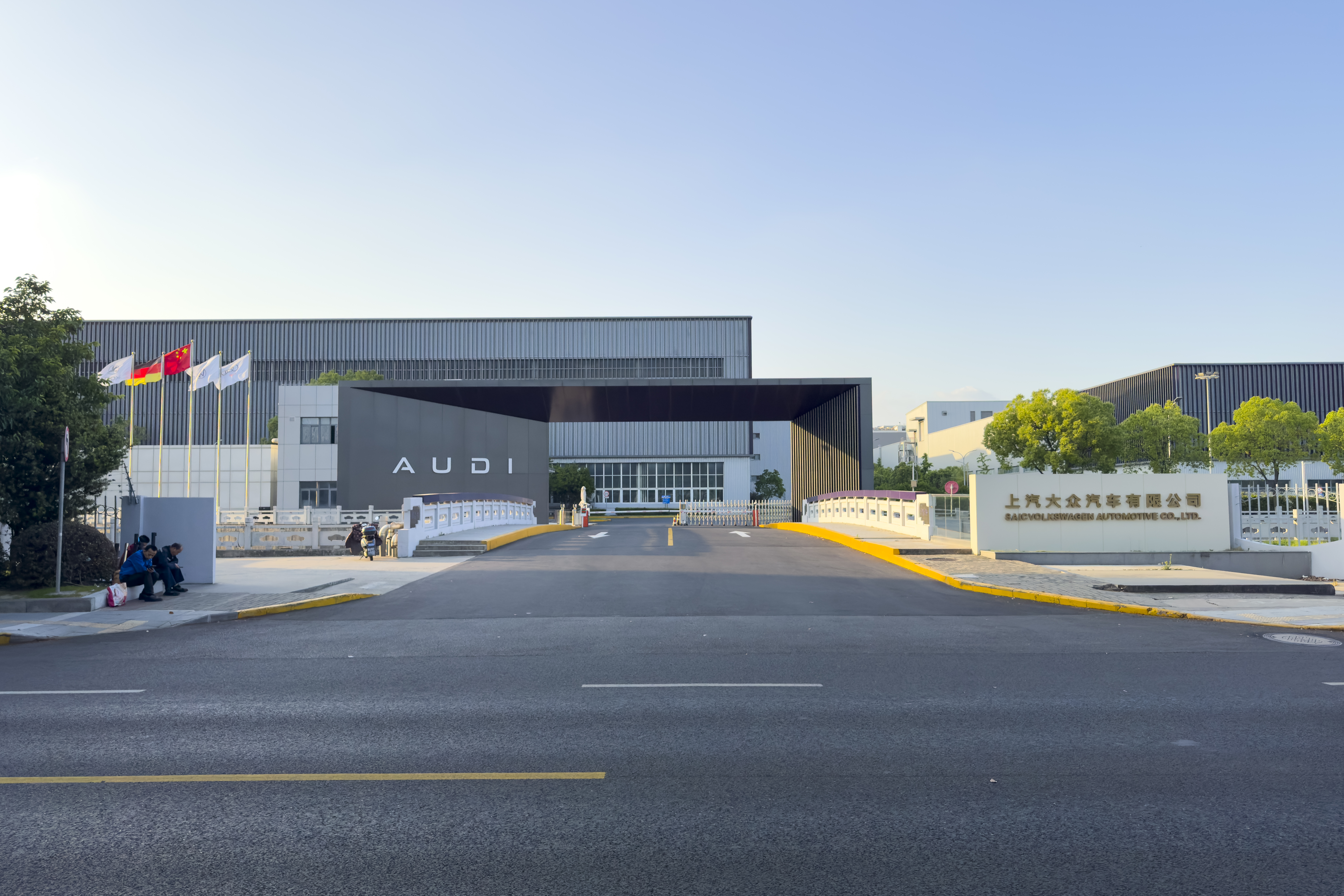
SAIC Volkswagen Anting Second Plant, currently exclusive for AUDI automobiles.

AUDI vehicles are produced by the SAIC Volkswagen joint venture at a dedicated production site in Anting, Shanghai. The plant previously produced Audi's MEB-based Q4 e-tron and Q5 e-tron models for the Chinese market. The plant has since become exclusive to AUDI-brand production.

== Products ==
=== Current models ===
- AUDI E5 (2025–present), compact station wagon, BEV
- AUDI E7X (2026–present), full-size SUV, BEV/EREV
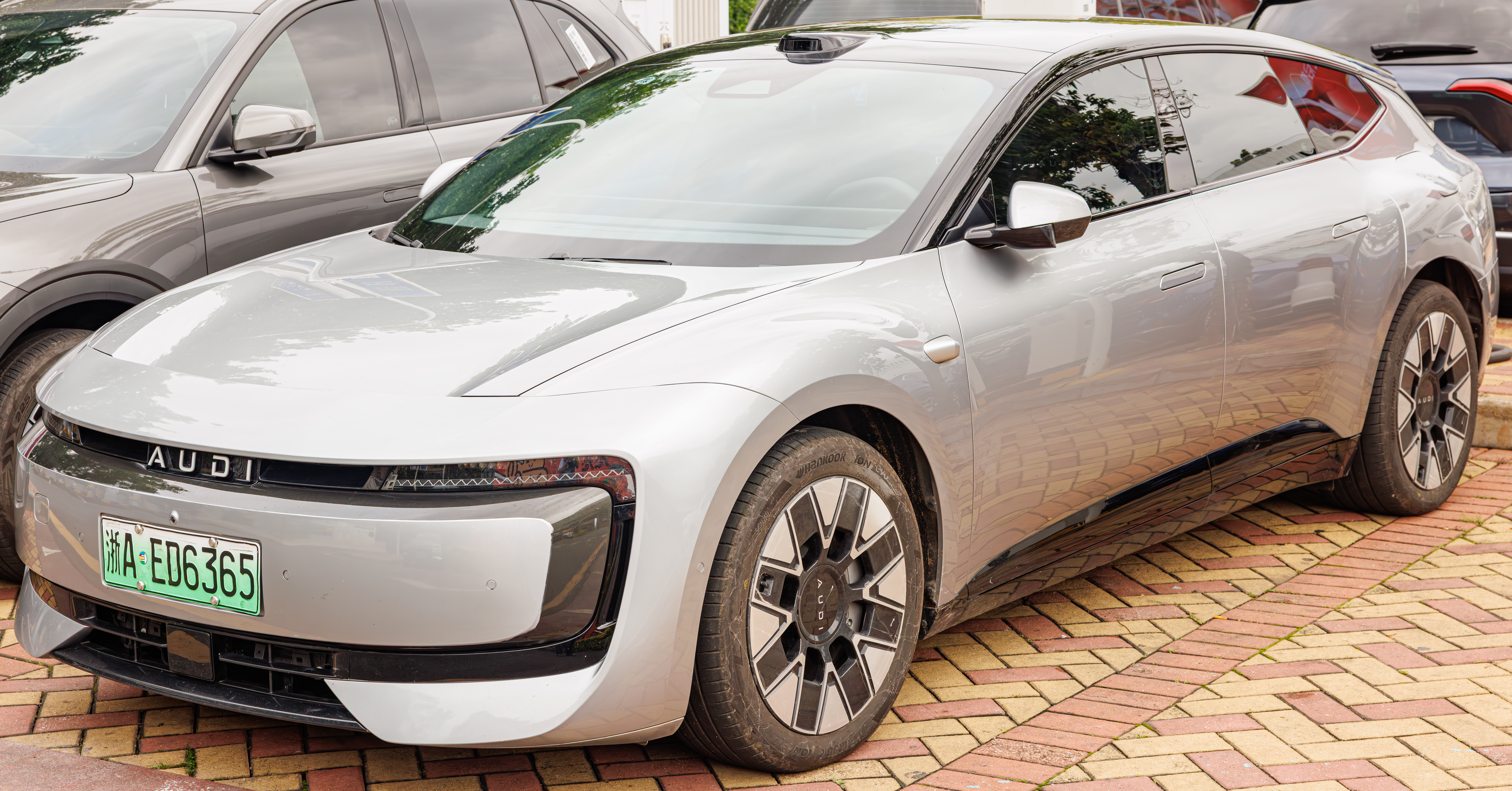
AUDI E5 Sportback

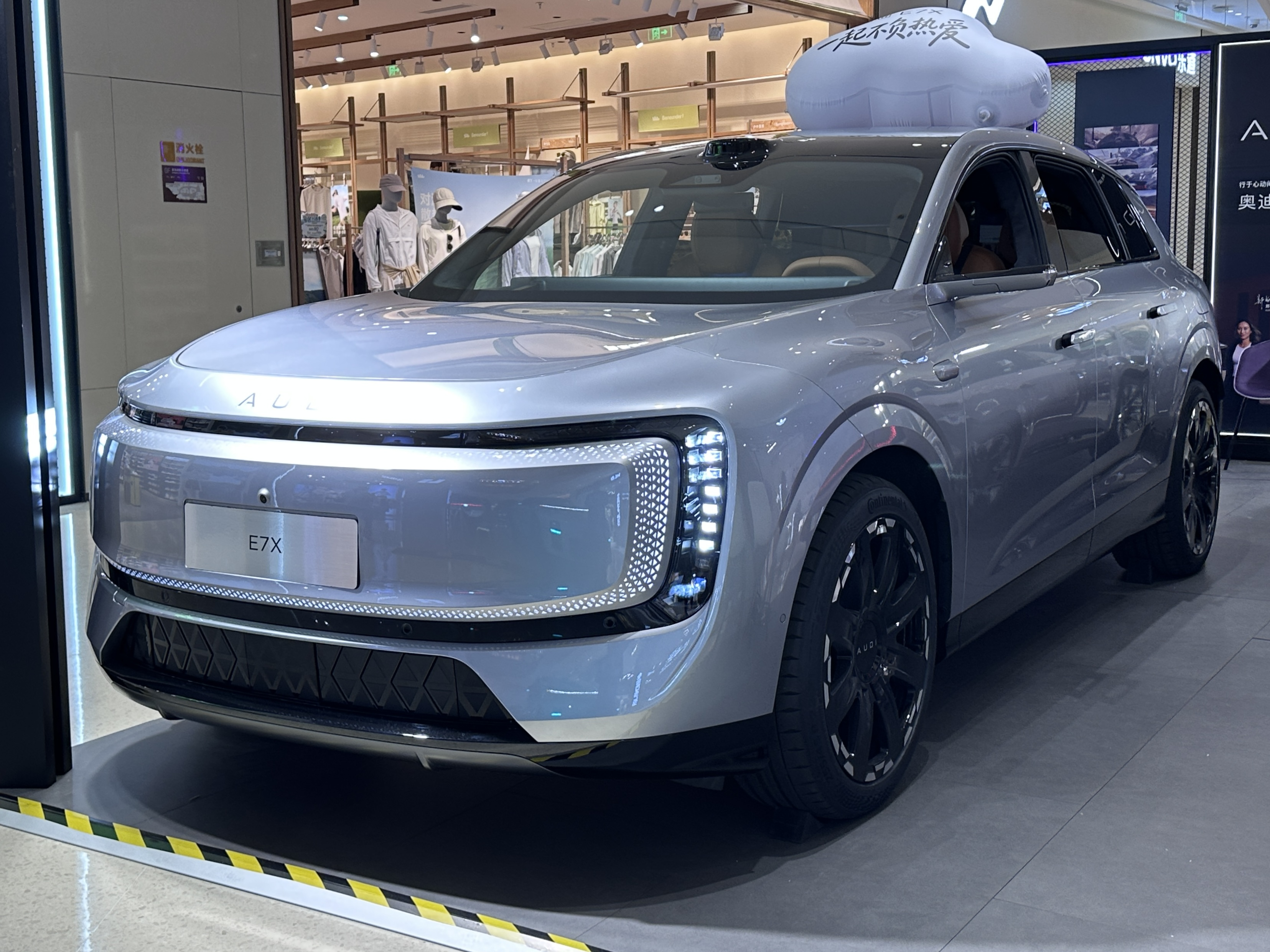
AUDI E7X

=== Concept vehicles ===
- AUDI E (2024), shooting-brake-style concept previewing the E5 Sportback
- AUDI E SUV (2025), previewed the production AUDI E7X
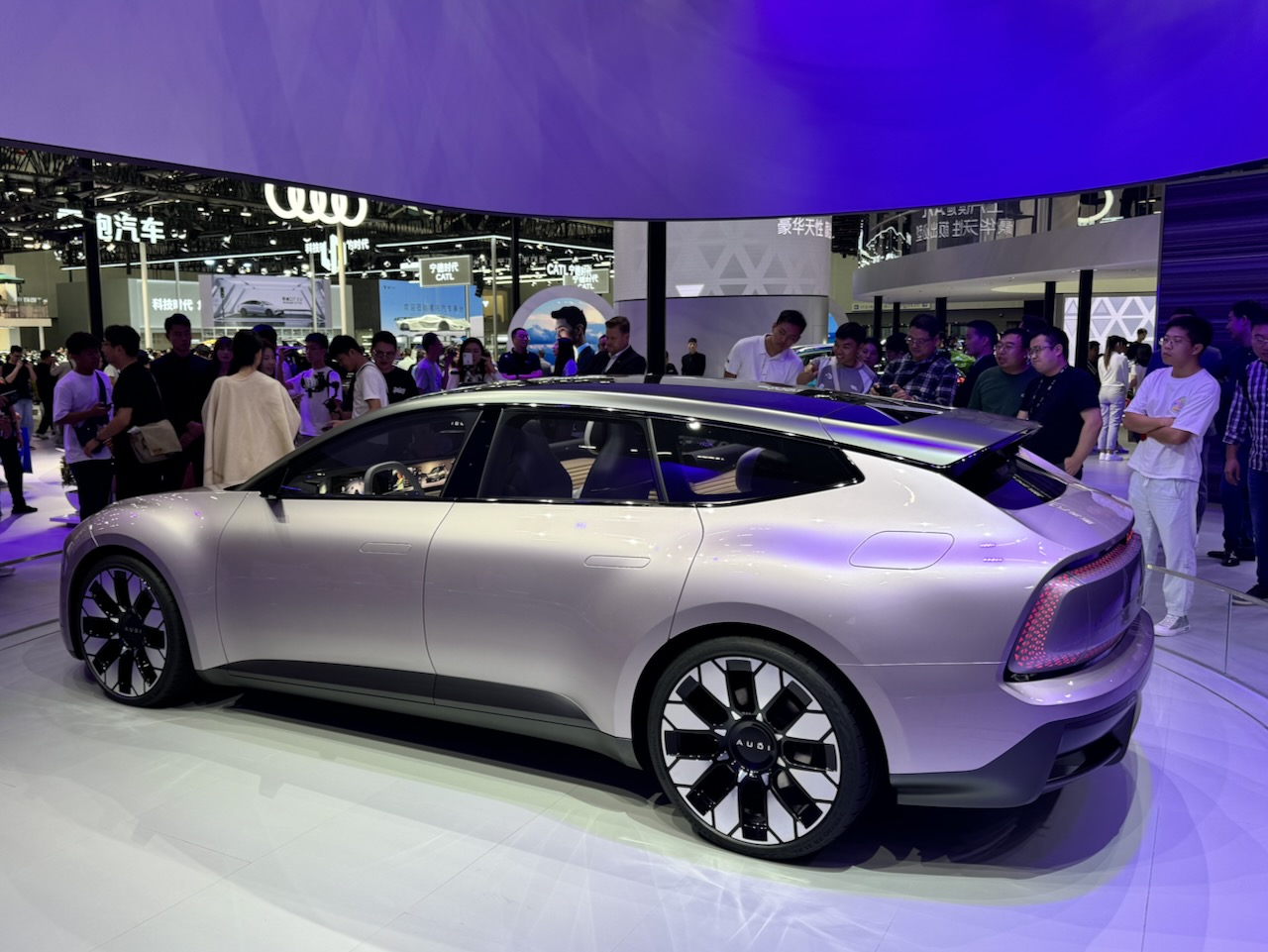
AUDI E

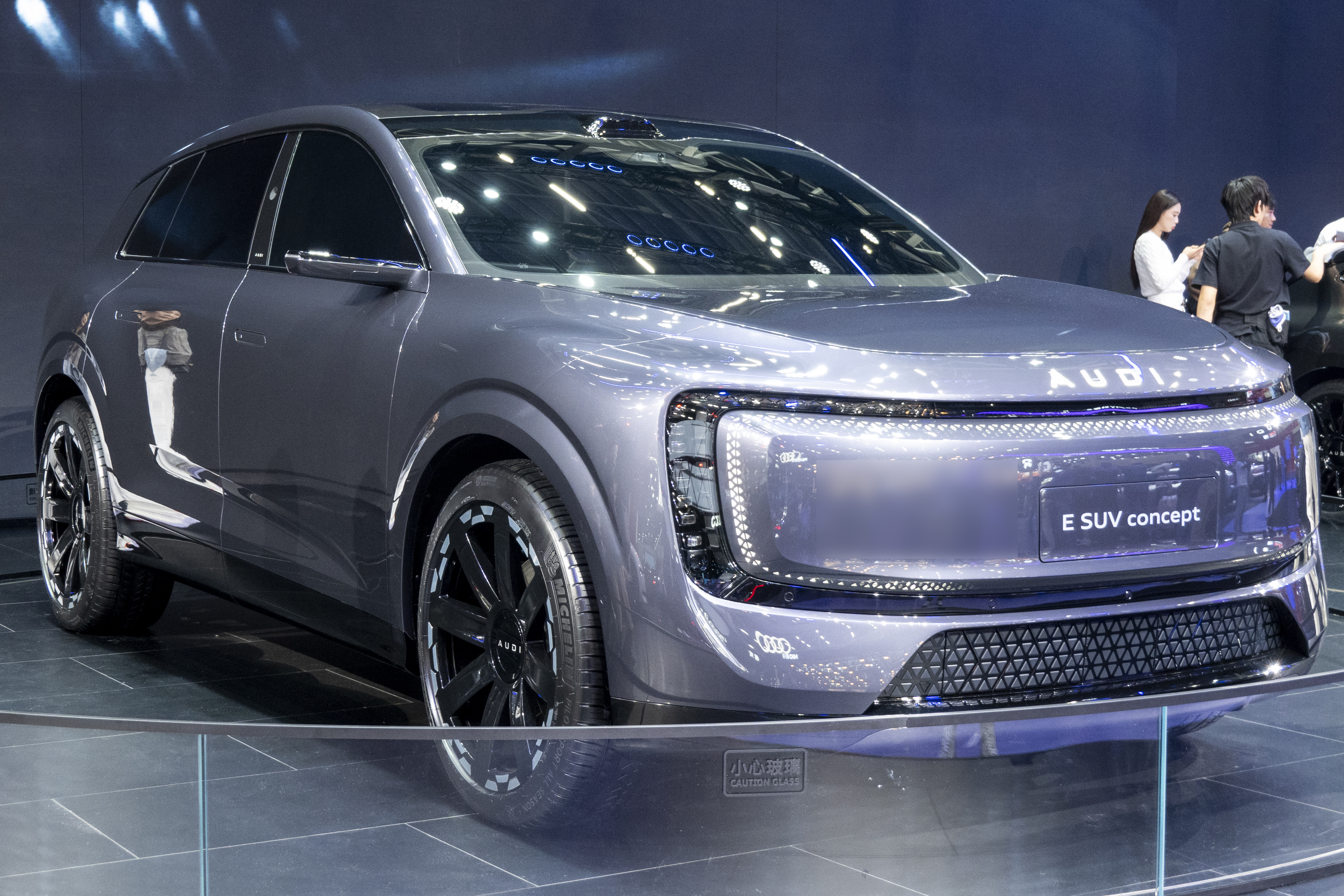
AUDI E SUV
