= AUDI E5 =

Battery electric compact executive shooting brake

AUDI E5 Sportback
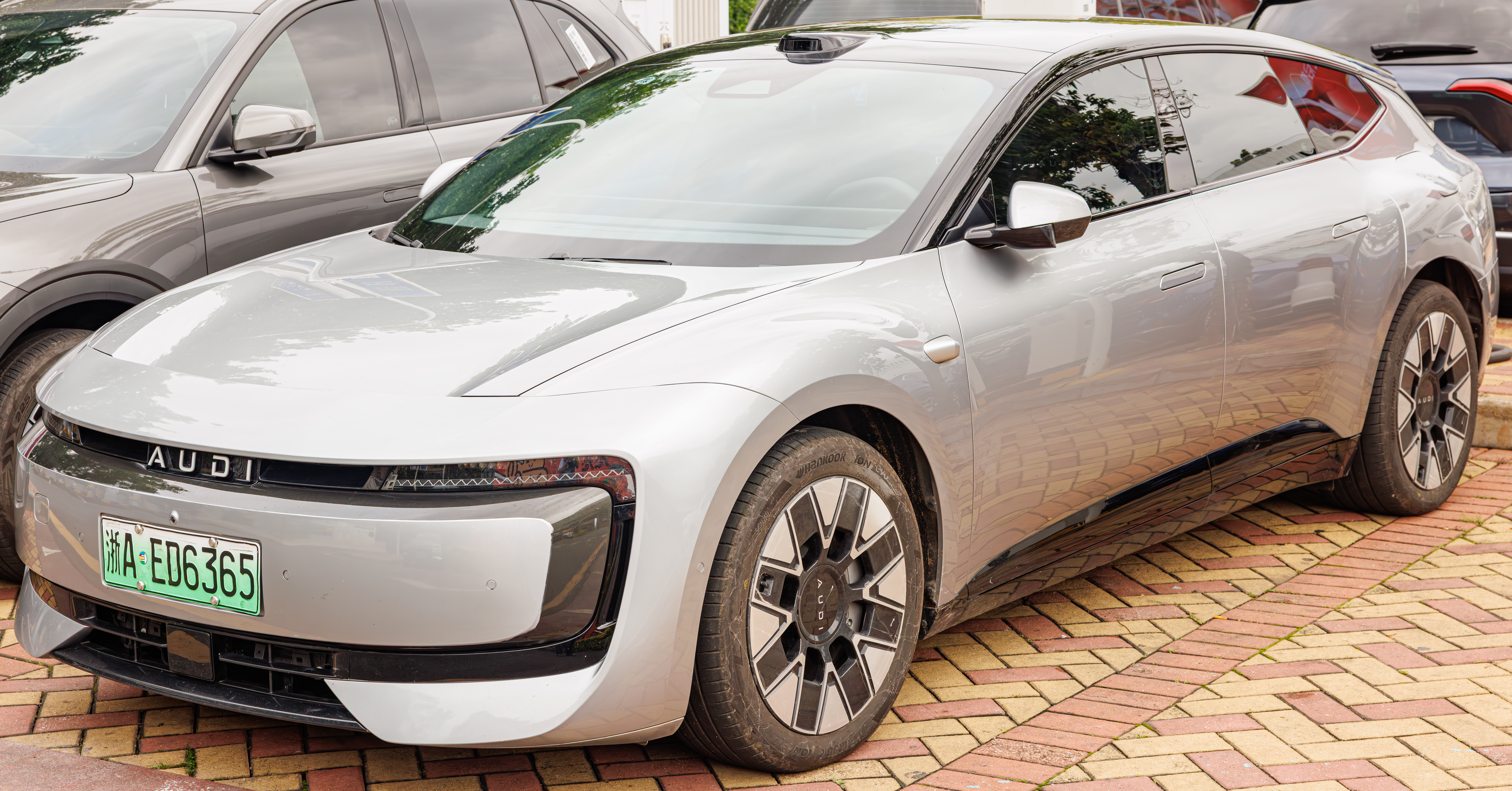

Overview
- Manufacturer: SAIC Volkswagen
- Also called: AUDI E (concept)
- Production: August 2025 – present
- Assembly: China: Shanghai (SAIC Volkswagen)
- Designer: Kamil Łabanowicz

Body and chassis
- Class: Compact executive car (D)
- Body style: 5-door shooting brake
- Layout: Rear-motor, rear-wheel-drive; Dual-motor, all-wheel-drive
- Platform: Advanced Digitized Platform
- Related: IM L6 / MG IM5

Powertrain
- Electric motor: Permanent magnet synchronous
- Power output: Up to 579 kW (776 hp; 787 PS)
- Battery: 100 kWh NMC CATL
- Range: Up to 770 km (478 mi) (CLTC)

Dimensions
- Wheelbase: 2,950 mm (116.1 in)
- Length: 4,881 mm (192.2 in)
- Width: 1,959 mm (77.1 in)
- Height: 1,478 mm (58.2 in)

The AUDI E5 Sportback (Chinese: 奥迪E5; pinyin: Àodí E5) is a battery electric compact executive shooting brake produced by SAIC Volkswagen under the China-only AUDI marque. It is the first vehicle co-developed between Chinese car manufacturer SAIC Motor and Audi. The car does not feature the four rings logo and the AUDI name is stylised in capitals, as it is considered a distinct brand for the Chinese market.

== Overview ==
The AUDI E5 Sportback is based on SAIC Motor's IM L6, sharing the electric motor, battery, electric control system, and the same platform, as part of a collaboration between Audi and SAIC.

The E5 Sportback was unveiled at the Shanghai Auto Show in April 2025 following the E concept being first shown at the Guangzhou Auto Show in November 2024, demonstrating a new design direction based on the "Advanced Digitized Platform".

The E5 Sportback reached dealerships for display in May 2025. Deliveries are slated to start in late August/early September 2025.

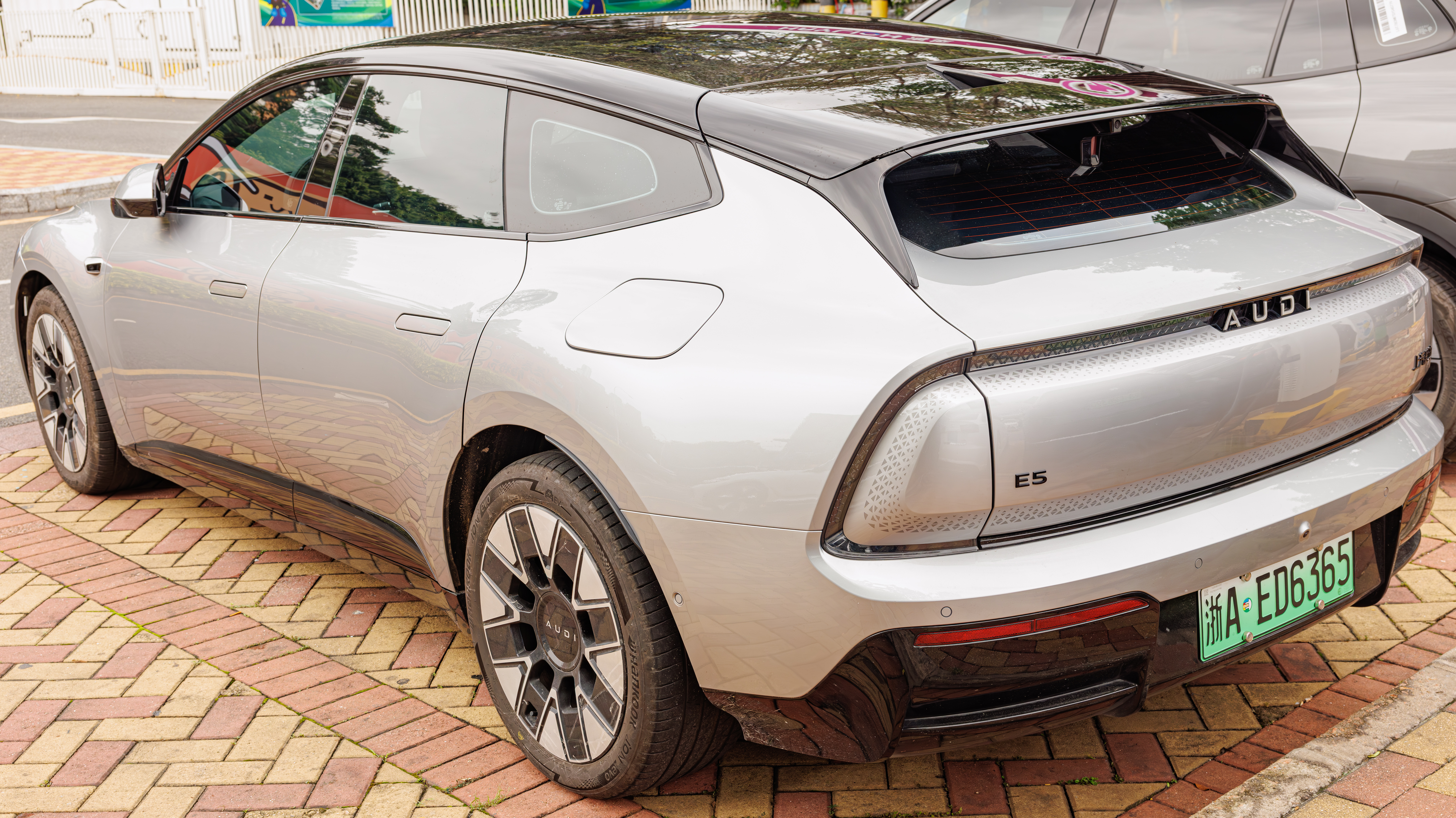
Rear view

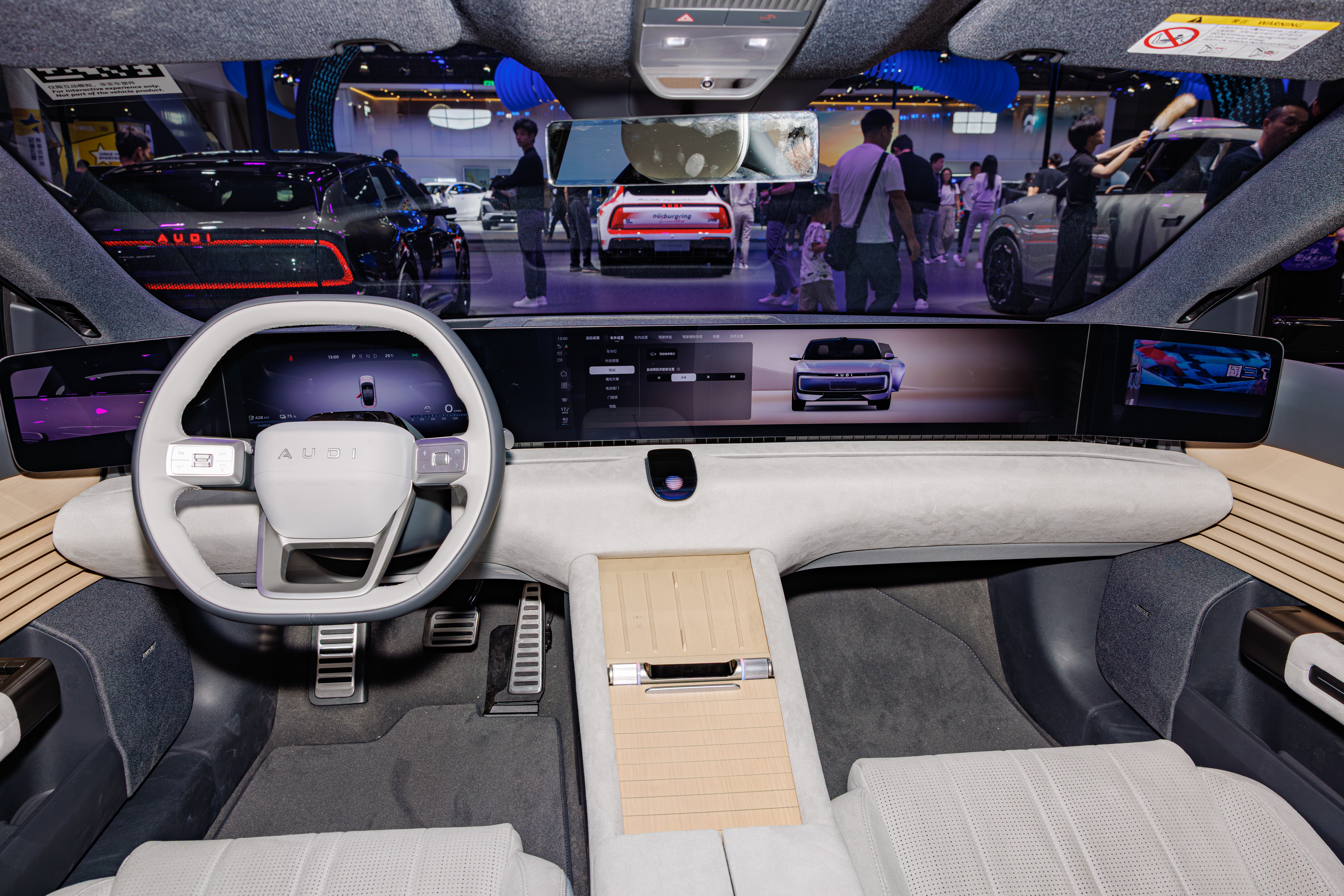
Interior

=== Features ===
The E5's powertrain features an adaptive air suspension as well as support for all wheel steering. In the interior there is a pillar-to-pillar 4K screen that also integrates the screens displayed by the cameras that replace the traditional wing mirrors. The display is powered by a Qualcomm Snapdragon 8295 chip.

The LiDAR-based AUDI 360 Assisted Driving system is also present on the E5 Sportback. Also included in the interior is an ambient natural lighting system and hidden air vents with a three-signature-scent fragrance diffuser.

== Powertrain ==
The E5 Sportback features a 800 volt architecture and is powered by dual motors producing a total of 764 bhp (570 kW; 775 PS) powered by a 100 kW·h battery and can accelerate from 0–100 km/h (62 mph) in a claimed 3.6 seconds.

== Sales ==
Sales	China
2025	4,843
