= Scorpion (disambiguation) =

A scorpion is a predatory arthropod animal.

Scorpion may also refer to:

== Computing and technology ==
- Scorpion (computer), a Russian ZX Spectrum clone computer
- Scorpion (CPU), a Qualcomm CPU used in smart phones

== Film and television ==
- Scorpion (2007 film), a French film
- Scorpion (2018 film), an Uzbek film
- The Scorpion (film), a 1990 Egyptian drama film
- Scorpion (TV series), an American drama series broadcast on CBS from 2014 to 2018
- "Scorpion" (Star Trek: Voyager), a 1997 episode of Star Trek: Voyager

== Gaming ==
- Scorpion (solitaire), a card game
- Scorpion (video game), 1989
- Scorpion: Disfigured, a 2009 German computer game
- Scorpion (Mortal Kombat), a video game character
- Scorpion, a wrestler in the video game Saturday Night Slam Masters

== Literature ==
=== Comics ===
- Scorpion (Marvel Comics), a number of Marvel Comics comics characters including:
  - Mac Gargan, a supervillain and frequent enemy of Spider-Man, the third Venom and a member of the Dark Avengers as the Black Spider-Man, but is back to "being" Scorpion
  - Scorpion (Carmilla Black)/Thanasee Rappaccini, first appeared in Amazing Fantasy vol. 2 #7 and was created by Fred Van Lente and Leonard Kirk
  - Silver Scorpion (Elizabeth Barstow) first appeared in Daring Mystery Comics #7 (April 1941)
  - Kron Stone, an enemy of Spider-Man 2099, in the Timestorm 2009–2099 alternate reality
  - Jefferson Davis (character), an enemy of Spider Woman on Earth-65
- Scorpion (Atlas/Seaboard Comics), a character from former Marvel Comics publisher Martin Goodman's Atlas/Seaboard Comics
- Scorpion, a Fawcett Comics character from Earth-S who appeared in Captain Marvel
- Le Scorpion, a Belgian comic set in 18th-century Vatican, by Stephen Desberg and Enrico Marini
- Scarlet Scorpion, an AC Comics character

=== Other uses in literature ===
- Scorpion (publishing house), an early-1900s Russian book publisher
- The Scorpion, a title used for one issue in 1939 by the pulp magazine The Western Raider
- The Scorpion (novel), a 1982 novel by Zayd Mutee' Dammaj
- Scorpion (novel), a 1985 spy thriller by Andrew Kaplan
- Scorpions (novel), a 1988 novel by Walter Dean Myers

== Music ==
- Scorpions (band), a German hard rock band
  - The Scorpions, a 1976 re-issue of their 1972 debut album Lonesome Crow
- The Scorpions (London band), a British instrumental group
- The Scorpions (Manchester band), a British beat group
- The Scorpions, an English rock band later renamed Status Quo
- The Scorpion (album), an album by Lou Donaldson
- Scorpion (Drake album), a 2018 double album
- Scorpion (Eve album) (2001)
- "The Scorpion", a song by Megadeth from The System Has Failed

== People ==
- Scorpion I, Egyptian pharaoh
- Scorpion II, Egyptian pharaoh

== Military/paramilitary ==
=== Combat units ===
- Scorpions (Iraq), a paramilitary Iraqi force organized by the CIA
- Scorpions (paramilitary), a paramilitary group involved in the 1995 Srebrenica massacre
- Scorpions (South Africa), a multidisciplinary agency that investigated and prosecuted organised crime and corruption
- VAQ-132 or the Scorpions, a U.S. Navy aircraft squadron

=== Vessels ===
- Soviet submarine B-427, or Scorpion, a Soviet Navy submarine
- CSS Scorpion, a Confederate States Navy boat
- HMS Scorpion, various ships of the British Royal Navy
- USS Scorpion, various ships of the US Navy
- USS Scorpion, a fictional US Navy submarine in the 1957 novel On the Beach

=== Other military vehicles ===
- FV101 Scorpion, British light tank
- M56 Scorpion, unarmored American self-propelled anti-tank gun
- Northrop F-89 Scorpion, American jet fighter
- Rotem KW1 Scorpion, South Korean wheeled armored personnel carrier
- Textron AirLand Scorpion, American light attack jet aircraft proposed for export

=== Weaponry ===
- Scorpio (weapon), an ancient Greco-Roman catapult
- Scourge, a whipping device, also called a scorpion
- Škorpion vz. 61, a Czech submachine gun
- CZ Scorpion Evo 3, a Czech submachine gun
- Scorpion silent pistol, a Georgian pistol

== Sports ==
=== Team/club names ===
- Scorpion aerobatic team, aerobatic demonstration team of the aviation arm of the Polish Land Forces
- Scorpions RFC, rugby club in East Africa
- Hannover Scorpions, German ice hockey team
- Logan Scorpions, Australian rugby league football club
- New Mexico Scorpions, American hockey team
- San Antonio Scorpions, American soccer club
- Scottsdale Scorpions, American professional baseball team
- South Wales Scorpions, Welsh rugby league football club
- Stuttgart Scorpions, German American football team
- Yuma Desert Rats or Yuma Scorpions, defunct baseball team that played in various independent minor leagues
- The Scorpions, a professional wrestling tag-team from the United States Wrestling Association

=== Other uses in sports ===
- Scorpion (horse), Irish Thoroughbred racehorse and sire
- Scorpion kick (association football)
- Scorpion kick (martial arts)
- Sharpshooter (professional wrestling) or scorpion hold, a professional wrestling hold
- Scorpion, a shot used in pickleball

== Transportation ==
- Scorpion (dinghy), a class of small sailing dinghy
- Grinnall Scorpion III, a three-wheeled roadster
- Grinnall Scorpion IV, a four-wheeled roadster
- Mahindra Scorpio-N, an Indian compact SUV
- Mitsubishi Scorpion, an automobile made by Mitsubishi Motors
- Ronn Motor Scorpion, an automobile
- RotorWay Scorpion, a line of helicopters
- SC Scorpion, a Ukrainian paraglider design

== Other uses ==
- Scorpion (roller coaster), a roller coaster at Busch Gardens Tampa Bay
- Scorpion bowl, a mixed alcoholic drink
- Scorpion Prison, a prison in Egypt

== See also ==
- Scorpia (comics), a Marvel Comics supervillainess
- Scorpia (Princesses of Power), fictional character in the animated television series She-Ra: Princess of Power and She-Ra and the Princesses of Power
- Scorpio (disambiguation)
- The Scorpion and the Frog, an animal fable
- Scorpion man, an Akkadian mythological figure
- Scorpius (disambiguation)
- Scorponok, several fictional characters in the various Transformers universes
- Skorpion (disambiguation)
- Water scorpion, an insect
- Sea Scorpion (disambiguation)
