= Ford RS Cosworth =

Ford RS Cosworth may refer to models of cars manufactured by Ford Motor Company

- Ford Sierra RS Cosworth
- Ford Escort RS Cosworth
