= MG5 (automobile) =

Compact car

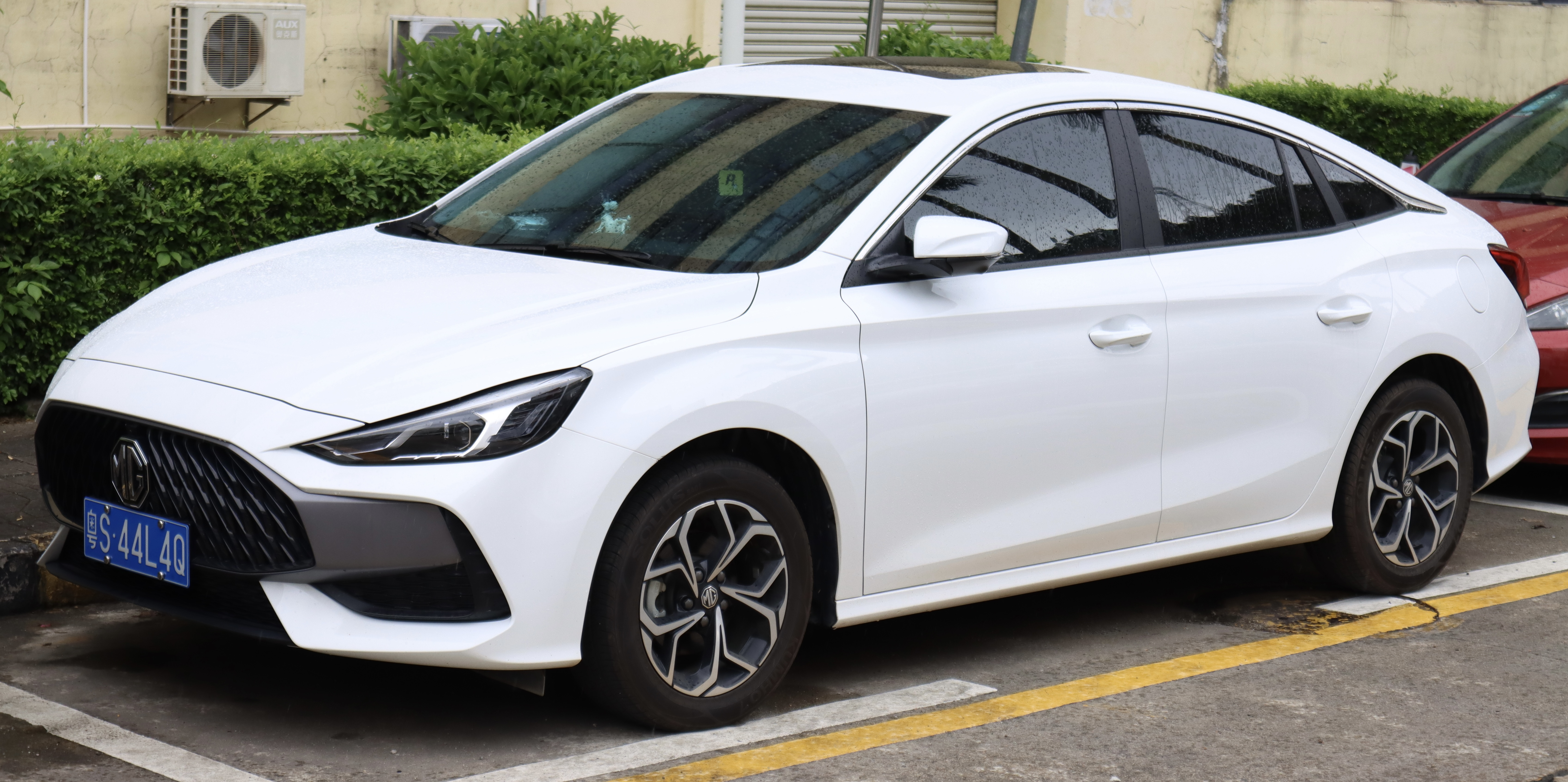
- 2020 MG5

Overview
- Manufacturer: SAIC Motor (MG Motor)
- Also called: MG GT
- Production: 2012–present

Body and chassis
- Class: Small family car (C)
- Layout: Front-engine, front-wheel-drive

Chronology
- Predecessor: Rover 25; MG ZR; MG GT (for second generation)

The MG5 is a series of compact cars that has been produced by SAIC Motor under the MG marque since 2012. The first generation MG5 was launched on 28 March 2012 in China, and shares the same automotive platform as the Roewe 350 saloon car.

In China, the first generation hatchback was sold as the MG5, while the saloon was sold as the MG GT. The first-generation MG GT was also sold as the MG5 in several markets.

The second-generation model is marketed as the MG5 in China and Thailand, and either the MG5 GT or MG GT elsewhere. For most markets outside China and Thailand, the MG5 nameplate is used for a different model, which is the export version of the Roewe i5. Its battery electric version, the Roewe Ei5 is exported to Europe as the MG5 EV.

== Early developments of the MG 5 (2005, 2009) ==
The earliest developments on the MG 5 can be traced back to April 2005 at the time when MG declared bankruptcy of Rover.

The first attempt at the MG 5 was when MG entered the Chinese market using the 2004 facelifted Rover 45 hatchback as the basis. Due to Honda owning the rights to the Rover 45's design and platform at the time and the eventual joint talks between Nanjing Auto and MG to purchase the MG brand, Honda stopped their licensing agreement with MG in response and the Rover 45-based MG 5 in its hatchback form never saw production in China. In 2009 at the Shanghai Auto Show, Nanjing Auto tried again with the MG5 name. This time, the car was based on the 2004 facelifted MG ZS sedan. The MG ZS-based MG 5 project was then cancelled entirely.

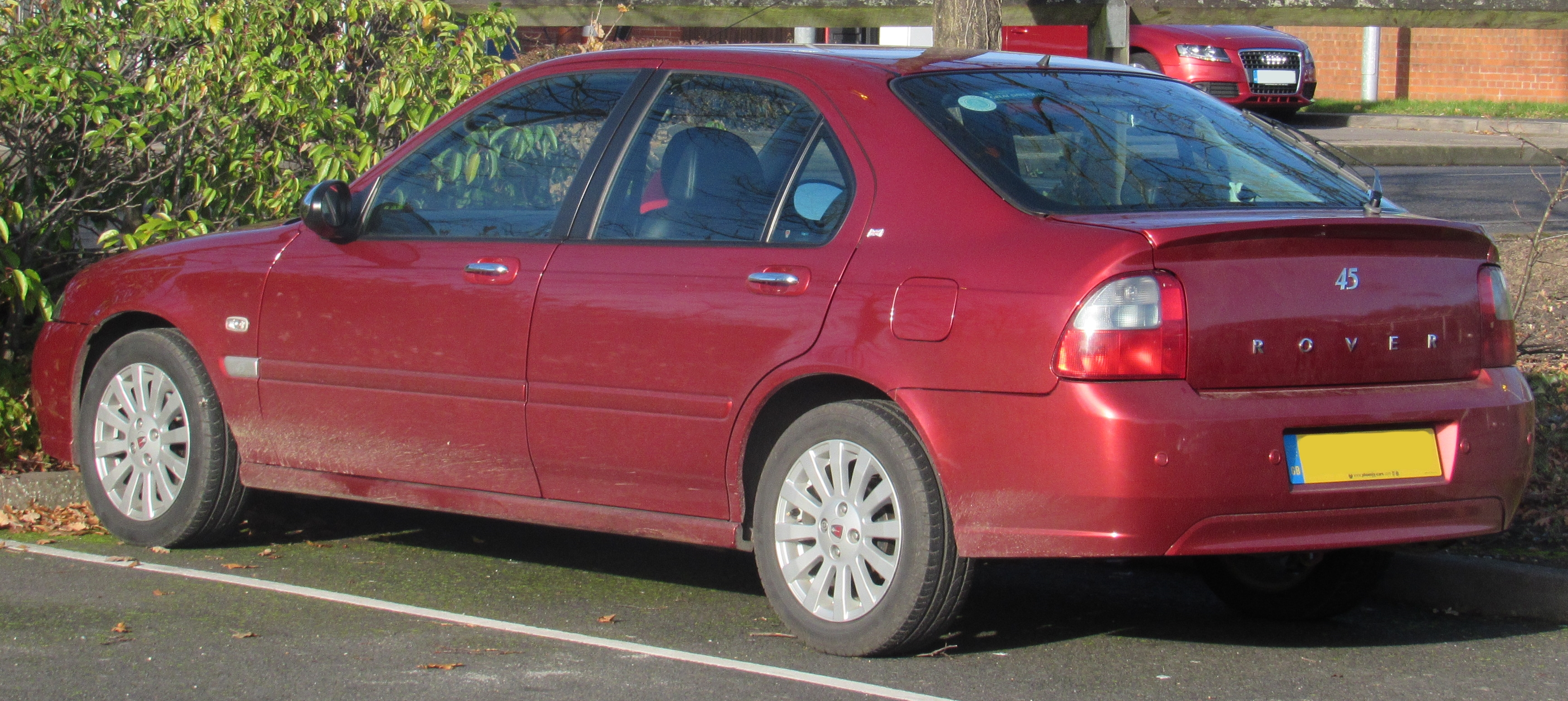
The first attempt at the MG 5, using the Rover 45 hatch as the basis

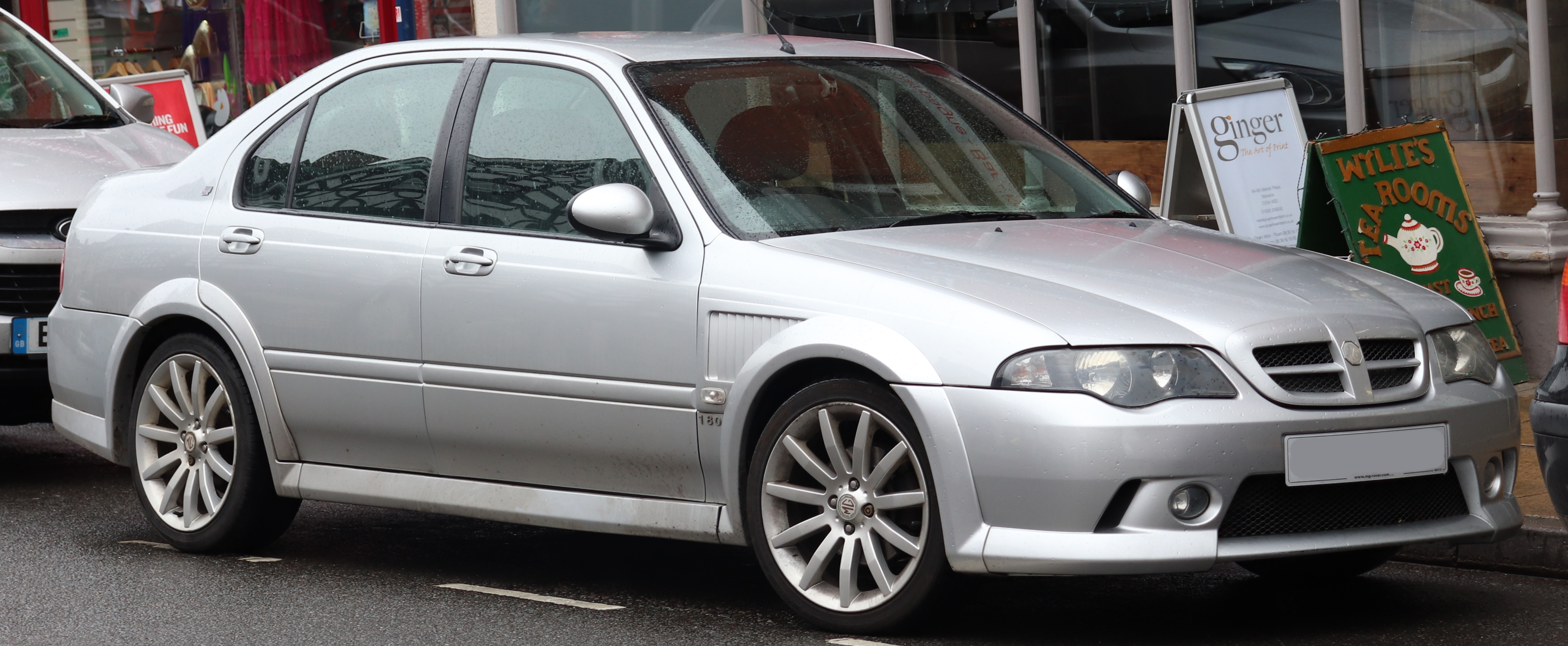
The second attempt at the MG 5 using the MG ZS as a basis

== First generation (AP12; 2012) ==
First generation
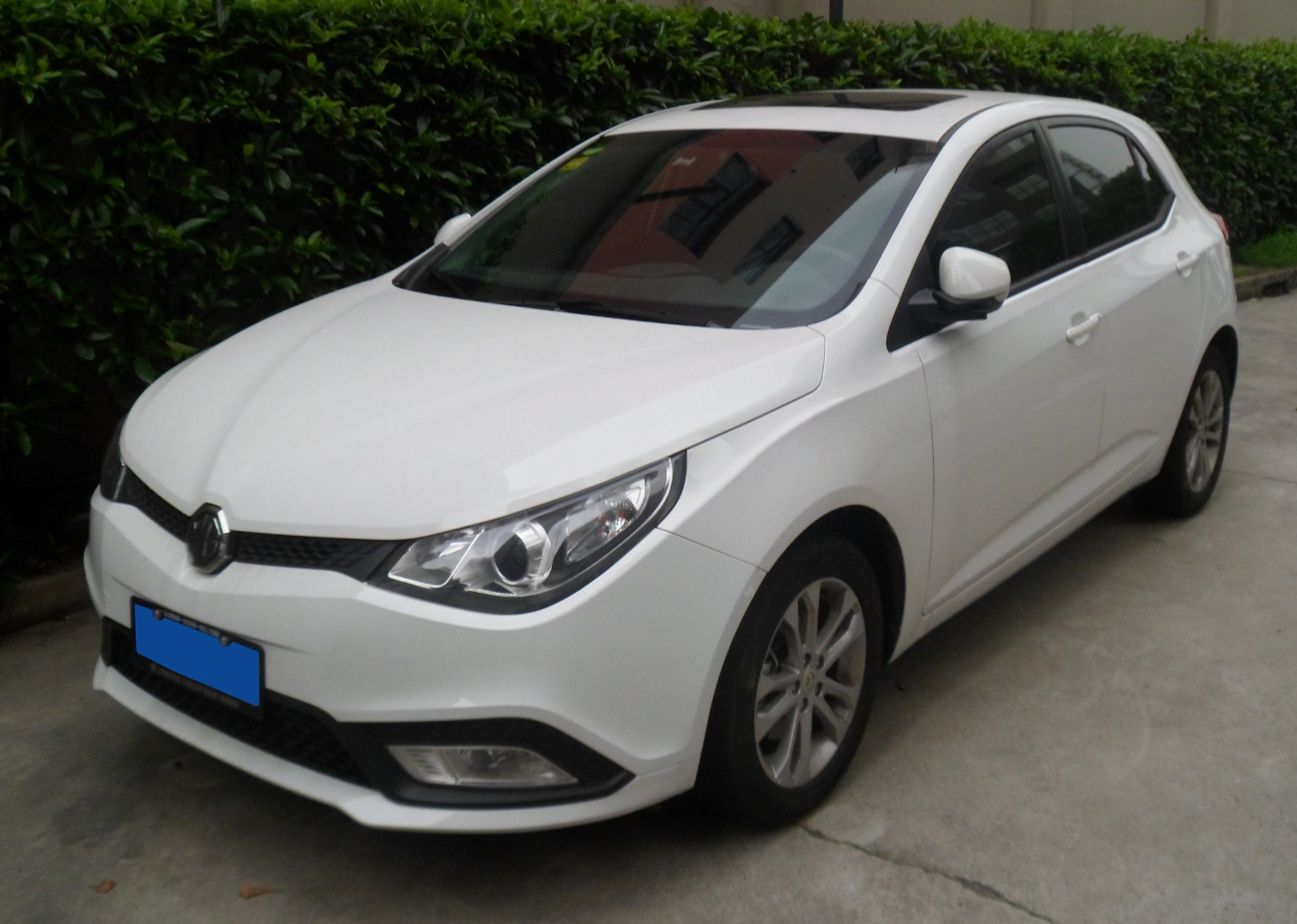

Overview
- Model code: AP12
- Also called: MG GT (saloon)
- Production: 2012–2018
- Assembly: China: Pukou, Nanjing; Thailand: Laem Chabang (SAIC-CP, saloon)
- Designer: Anthony Williams-Kenny, Steve Harper

Body and chassis
- Body style: 5-door hatchback 4-door saloon (MG GT)
- Related: Roewe 350

Powertrain
- Engine: Petrol: 1.5 L 15S4C I4; 1.5 L 15S4G I4
- Transmission: 5-speed manual 4-speed automatic 6-speed automatic

Dimensions
- Wheelbase: 2,650 mm (104.3 in)
- Length: 4,363 mm (171.8 in)
- Width: 1,800 mm (70.9 in)
- Height: 1,492 mm (58.7 in)

Chronology
- Predecessor: Rover 25; MG ZR
- Successor: Roewe i5/MG 5

The first generation MG5 debuted in concept car form at the 2011 Shanghai Auto Show as the MG Concept 5.

Outside of China, this first generation was exported to various emerging markets such as Egypt, Chile and Algeria.

=== Technical details ===
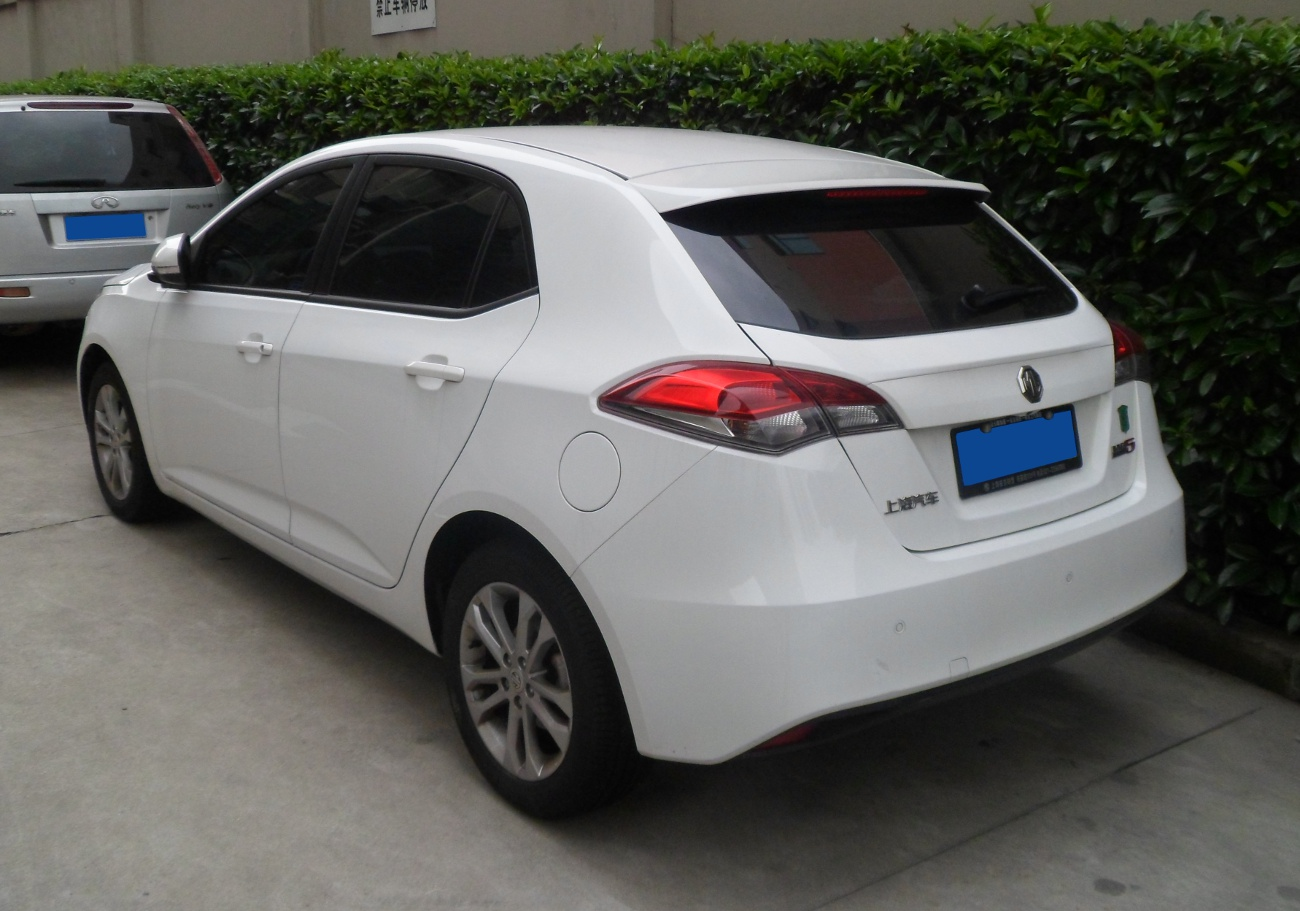
Rear view

The production MG5 is powered by a 1.5 litre petrol four cylinder "VTi-Tech" engine, producing 80 kW (109 PS; 107 bhp) and 135 N⋅m (100 lb⋅ft). There is a choice of five speed manual or four speed automatic transmissions.

A 1.5 litre turbo "Hyperboost" version was launched in November 2013, producing 95 kW (129 PS; 127 bhp) and 210 N⋅m (155 lb⋅ft) mated to a six speed automatic transmission with a claimed top speed of 200 km/h (124 mph). All models are equipped with 16 inch wheels, fitted with 205/55 tyres.

== Second generation (2020) ==
Second generation
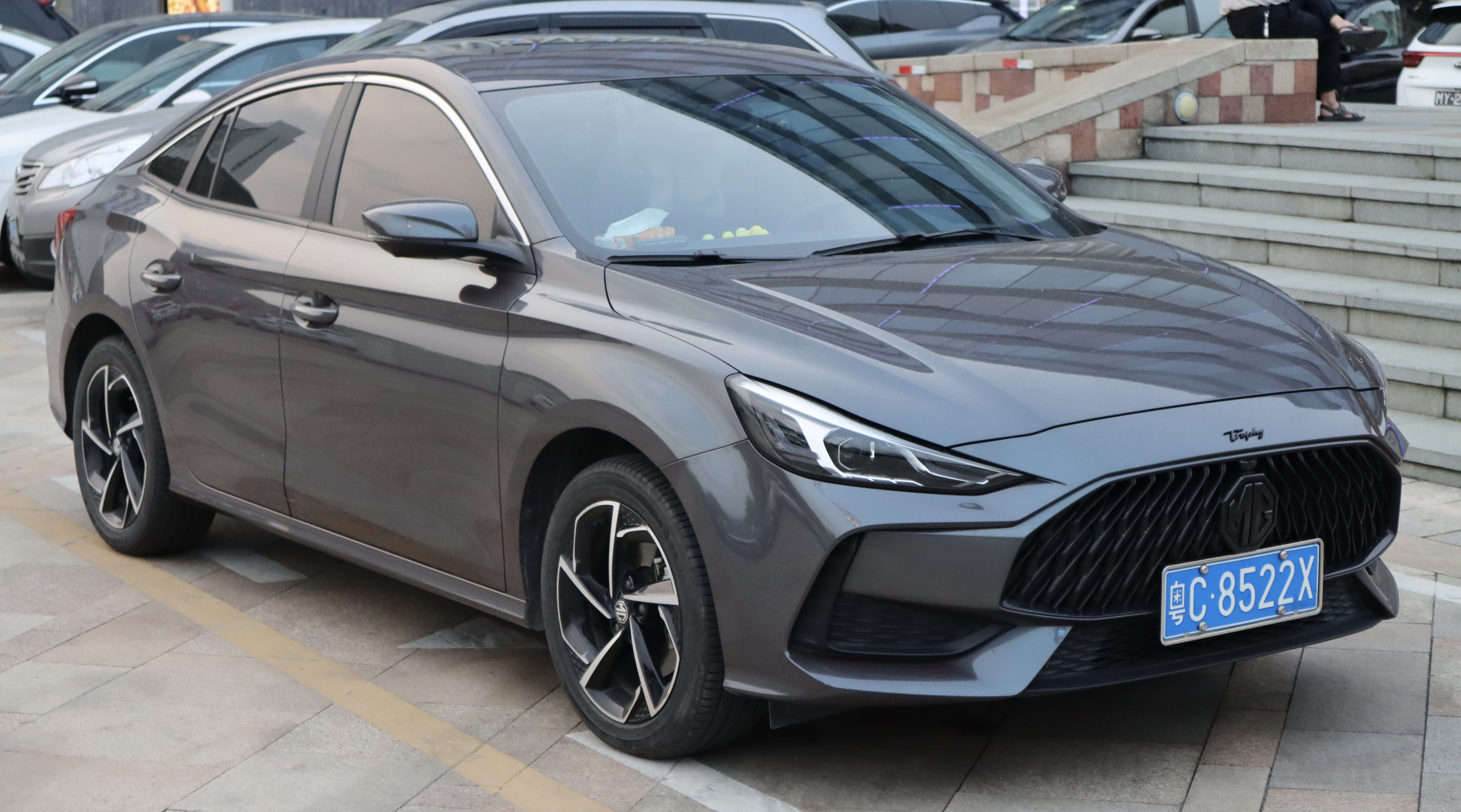
- 2020 MG5 300 TGI (China)

Overview
- Model code: AP32
- Also called: MG GT
- Production: 2020–present
- Assembly: China: Pukou, Nanjing; Thailand: Laem Chabang (SAIC-CP)
- Designer: Jiping Luan

Body and chassis
- Body style: 4-door saloon
- Platform: PATAC K platform
- Related: Roewe i5

Powertrain
- Engine: Petrol: 1.5 L 15S4C/15FCD VTi-TECH I4; 1.5 L 15C4E turbo I4
- Transmission: 5-speed manual; 7-speed DCT; CVT

Dimensions
- Wheelbase: 2,680 mm (105.5 in)
- Length: 4,675 mm (184.1 in); 4,695 mm (184.8 in) (Scorpio Edition)
- Width: 1,842 mm (72.5 in)
- Height: 1,473–1,480 mm (58.0–58.3 in)
- Kerb weight: 1,205–1,330 kg (2,657–2,932 lb)

=== Overview ===
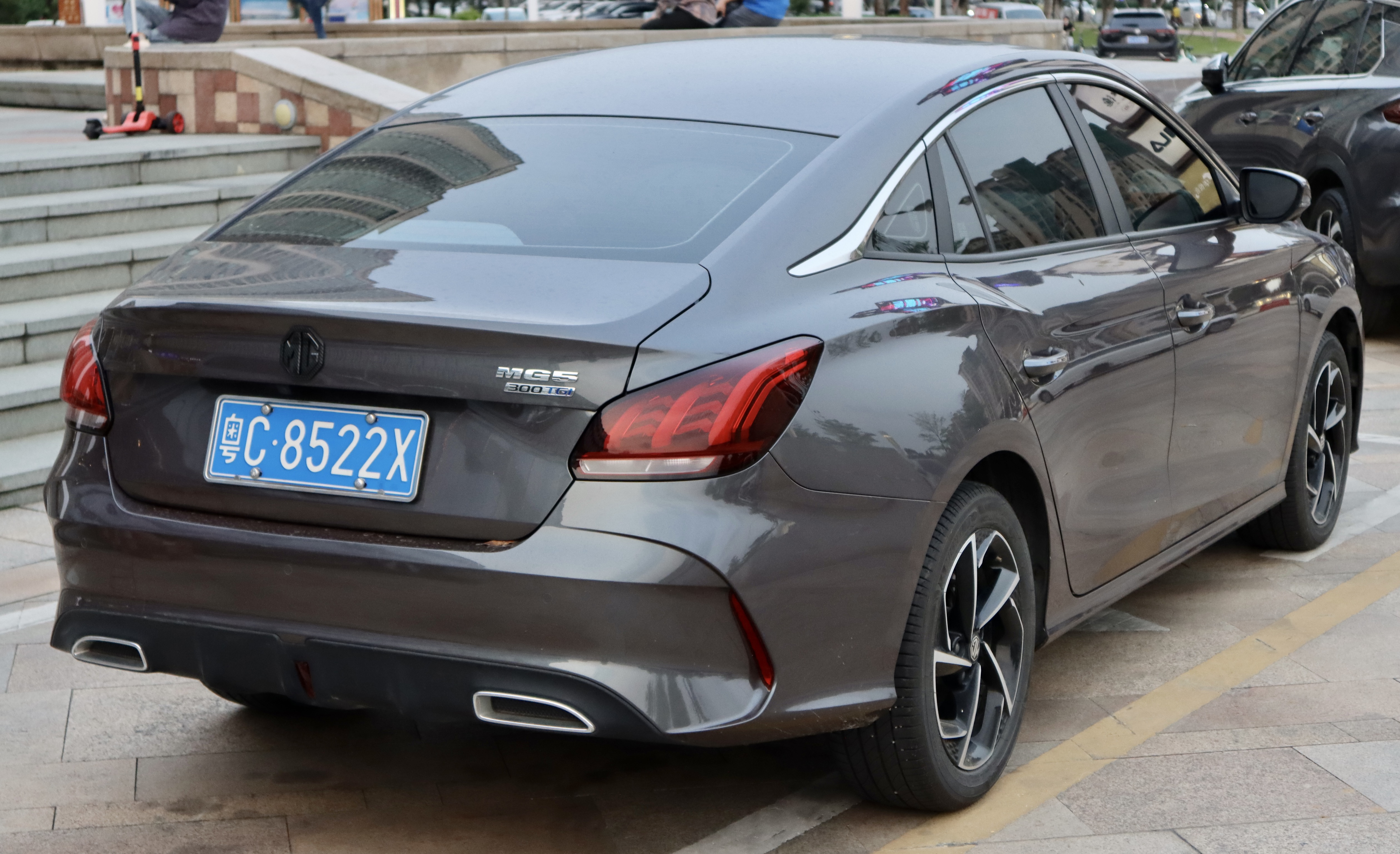
Rear view

The second generation MG5 debuted in September 2020 right before the 2020 Beijing Auto Show.

According to SAIC, the second generation MG5 features the third generation MG family design language, including a front fascia similar to the 2020 MG HS facelift, with engine options include a 1.5 litre turbo petrol four cylinder engine developed by SAIC, producing 173 PS (127 kW; 171 bhp) and a 1.5 litre petrol four cylinder engine producing 120 PS (88 kW; 118 bhp).

In China, the MG5 comes in two trims, 180DVVT and 300TGI. Combined fuel consumption for the MG 5 is rated at 5.6 litres per 100 kilometres and 5.7 litres per kilometres depending on trim level (42 US MPG and 41.2 US MPG respectively).

=== Facelift ===
The facelifted MG5 was unveiled on 14 August 2024. Changes includes the front fascia design updated with new headlights and the placement of the MG badge above the grille, and the rear fascia design updated with redesigned taillights and rear bumper design, and the interior was updated with a new digital cockpit and fewer buttons in the centre console.

In December 2025, the Egyptian market received the facelifted MG5 under the name MG GT.

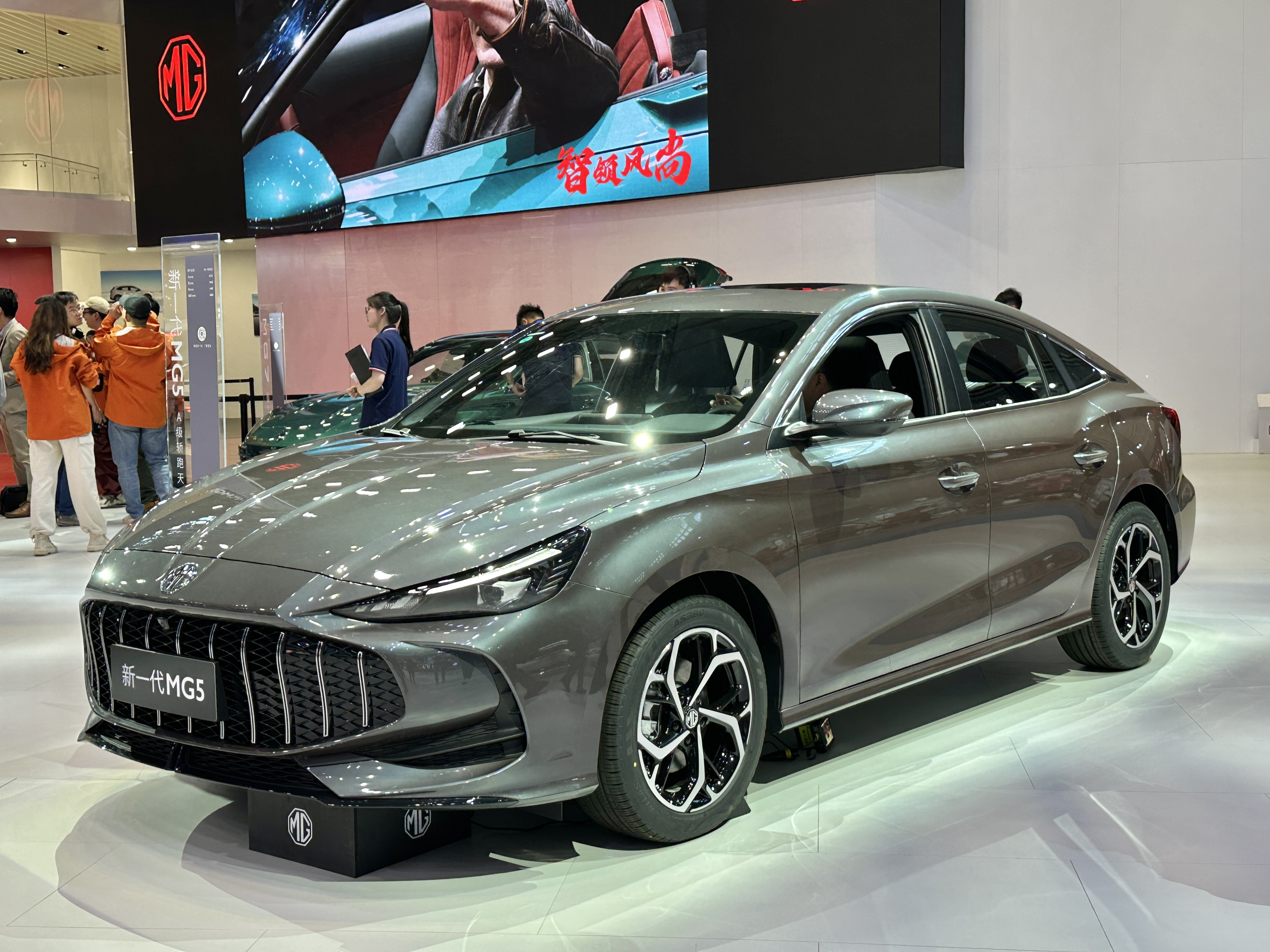
MG5 facelift

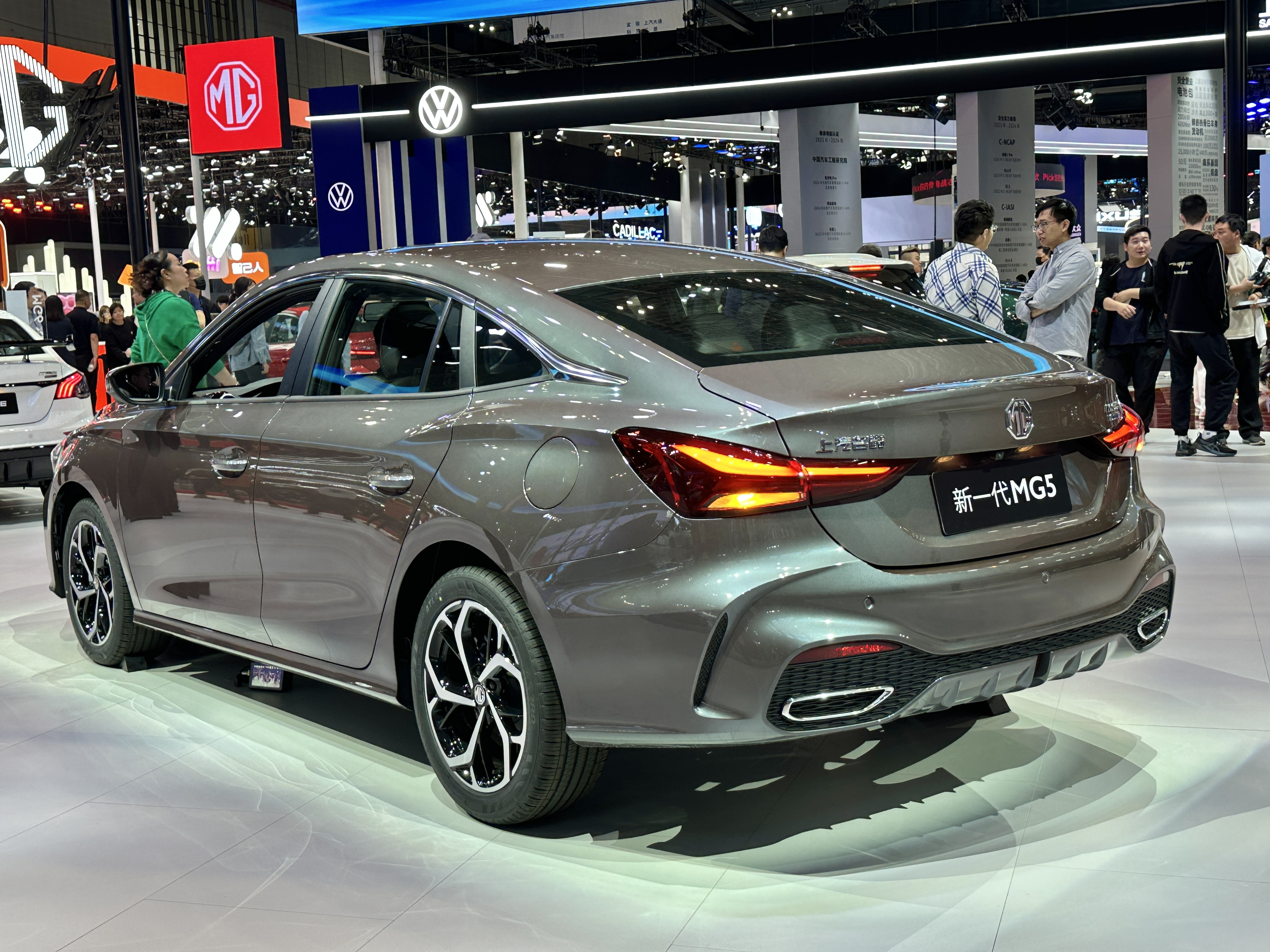
MG5 facelift (rear)

=== Powertrain ===
Specs
Model	Displacement	Power	Torque	Transmission	0–100 km/h (62 mph)	Top speed
1.5 L	1,490 cc (91 cu in) I4	88 kW (120 PS; 118 hp) at 6,000 rpm 95 kW (129 PS; 127 hp) at 6,000 rpm	150 N⋅m (111 lb⋅ft; 15.3 kg⋅m) at 4,500 rpm 158 N⋅m (117 lb⋅ft; 16.1 kg⋅m) at 4,500 rpm	5-speed manual		185 km/h (115 mph)
1.5 L	1,490 cc (91 cu in) I4	88 kW (120 PS; 118 hp) at 6,000 rpm 95 kW (129 PS; 127 hp) at 6,000 rpm	150 N⋅m (111 lb⋅ft; 15.3 kg⋅m) at 4,500 rpm 158 N⋅m (117 lb⋅ft; 16.1 kg⋅m) at 4,500 rpm	CVT	10.5 s	185 km/h (115 mph)
1.5 L Turbo	1,490 cc (91 cu in) turbo I4	173 PS (127 kW; 171 hp) at 5,600 rpm	250 N⋅m (184 lb⋅ft; 25.5 kg⋅m) at 3,000–4,000 rpm	7-speed DCT	8.5 s	215 km/h (134 mph)
1.5 L Turbo	1,490 cc (91 cu in) turbo I4	181 PS (133 kW; 179 hp) at 5,600 rpm	285 N⋅m (210 lb⋅ft; 29.1 kg⋅m) at 1,500–4,000 rpm	7-speed DCT		200 km/h (124 mph)

=== Safety ===
==== ANCAP ====
ANCAP rated the Australasian-market MG 5 zero stars in 2023 due to the lack of seatbelt pre-tensioners and its autonomous emergency braking being limited only to car-to-car and vulnerable road user. It is one of three vehicles that ever receive such score from the Australasian safety programme. ANCAP has accused MG of "a lack of design effort to prevent rear-seat occupant injury in frontal impact and side impact scenarios". In response, MG announced a $4 million worth of investment to introduce safety changes to the MG 5 to improve its crash-test performance for occupants by adding new collision avoidance features, which will be launched sometime in 2024 for the Australian market.

ANCAP test results MG 5 all variants (see Technical Report) (2023, aligned with Euro NCAP)
Test	Points	%
Overall:	0 /5 stars	
Adult occupant:	15.09	37%
Child occupant:	28.81	58%
Pedestrian:	26.78	42%
Safety assist:	2.48	13%

ANCAP test results MG 5 all variants (2025, aligned with Euro NCAP)
Test	Points	%
Overall:	3 /5 stars	
Adult occupant:	25.08	62%
Child occupant:	33.69	68%
Pedestrian:	41.55	65%
Safety assist:	10.78	59%

=== MG5 Scorpio (2022) ===
The MG5 received a performance variant called the MG5 Scorpio for the 2022 model year with the front fascia completely redesigned and an additional performance-inspired body kit and additional colour options. The MG5 Scorpio is powered by the same 1.5-litre turbo engine that powers the regular MG5 but tuned up to 181 hp (135 kW; 184 PS), 8 hp (6 kW; 8 PS) more than the standard model. The top speed is 200 km/h (124 mph) which is the same as the standard MG 5. Gearbox remains to be the same 7-speed DCT.

In comparison to the regular MG5, the Scorpio Edition is 20 millimetres longer, 7 millimetres higher, and has the same width and wheelbase. The Scorpio Edition is 125 kilograms heavier than its regular counterpart. Combined fuel consumption is rated at 6.1 litres per 100 kilometres (38.5 US MPG).

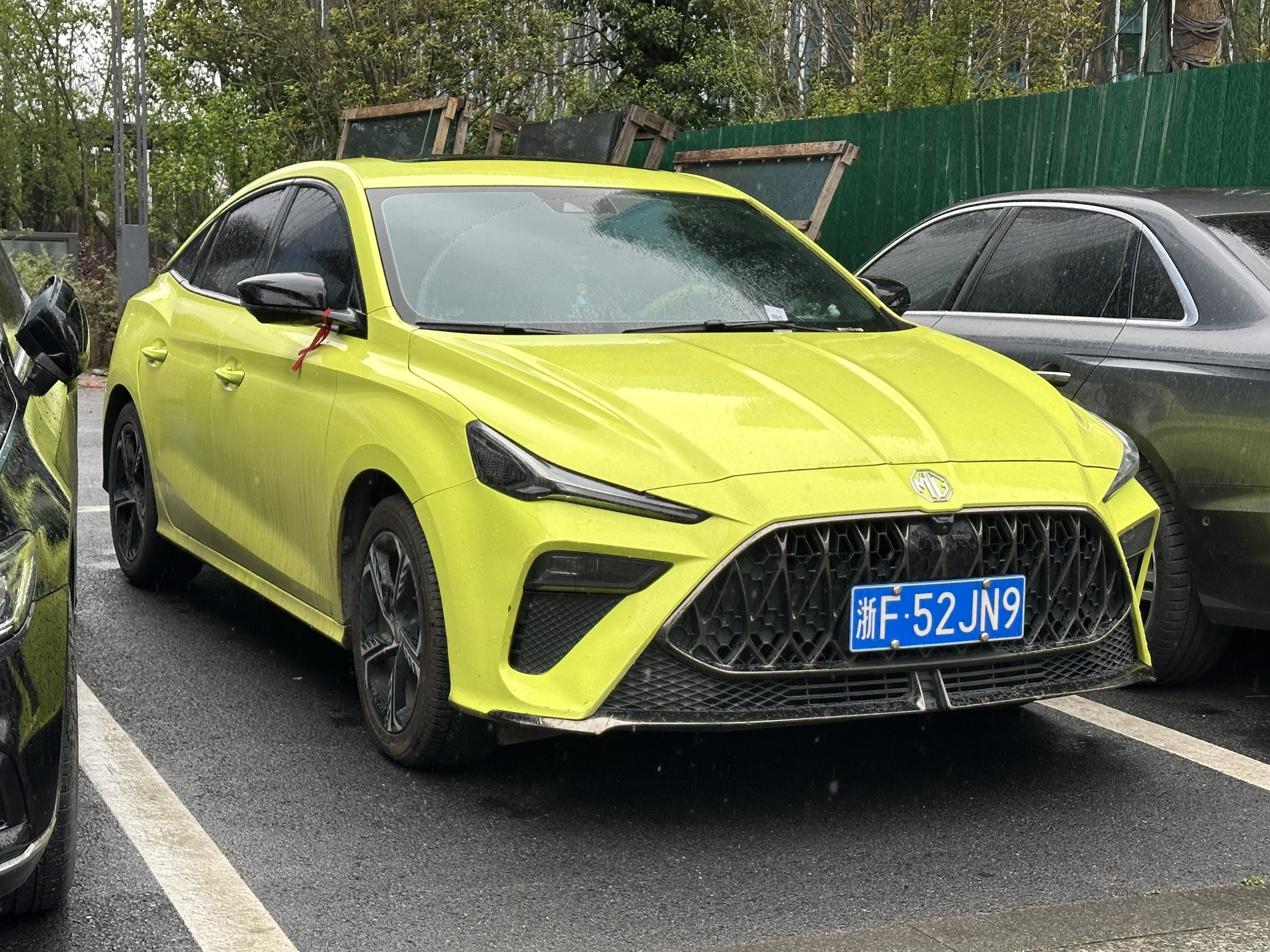
MG5 Scorpio (front)

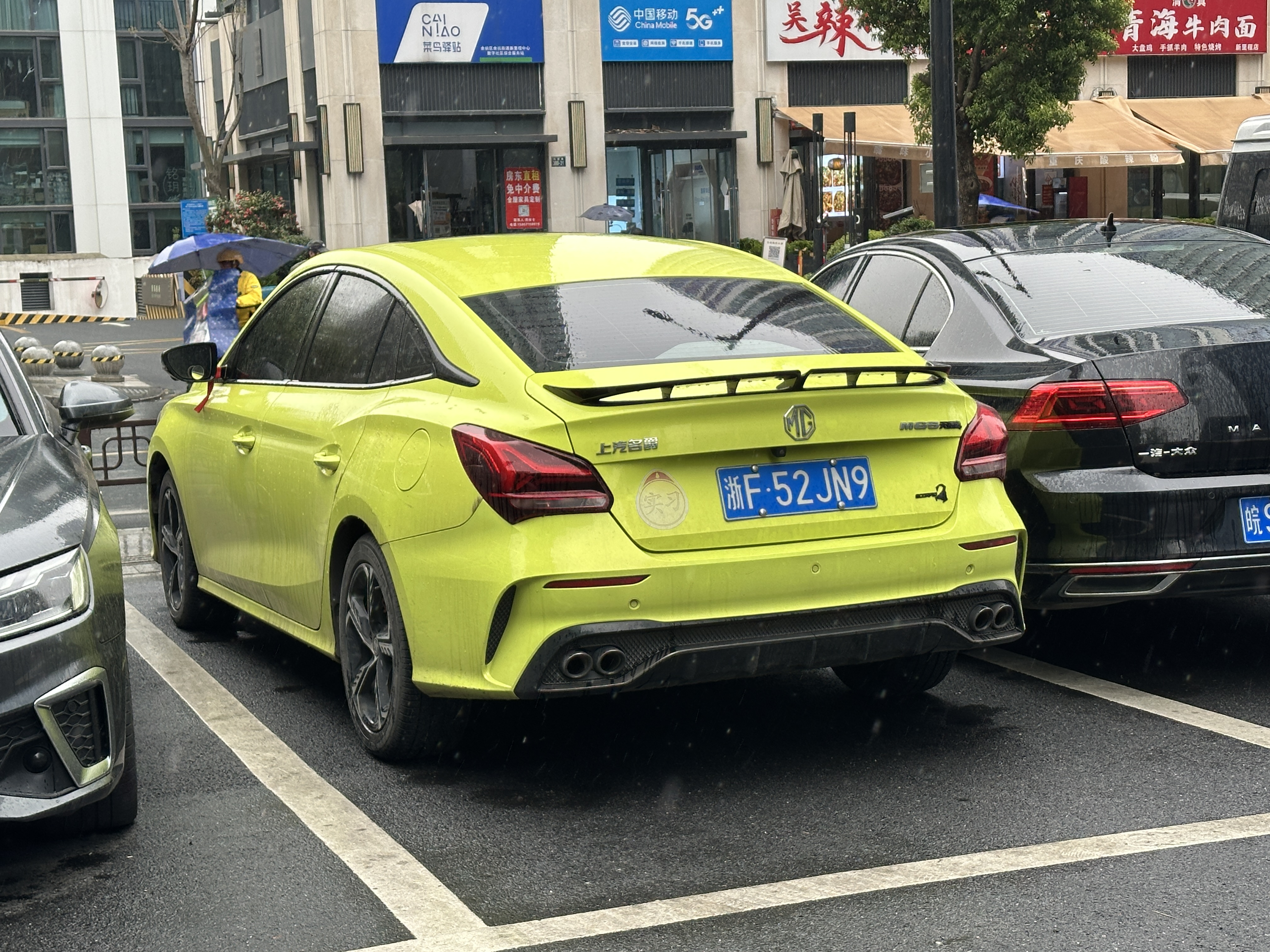
MG5 Scorpio (rear)

=== Markets ===
==== Australia ====
The MG5 was launched in Australia in June 2023. Imported from China, two trim levels known as Vibe and Essence are offered with the 1.5-litre naturally aspirated engine paired with a CVT transmission on the Vibe trim and the 1.5-litre turbo paired with a 7-speed dual clutch transmission on the Essence trim.

The Chinese-imported MG5 was one of only two vehicles introduced to Australia in 2023 to get the lowest possible Australasian New Car Assessment Program (ANCAP, aligned with Euro NCAP) safety rating of Zero stars in its Australasian market configuration.

The Vibe trim was discontinued in June 2025, therefore leaving the Essence using the 1.5-litre turbo paired with a 7-speed dual clutch transmission as the sole MG5 variant in Australia.

==== Bangladesh ====
The MG5 saloon was launched in Bangladesh in October 2023. It is available in two variants with two engine options: a 1.5-litre naturally-aspirated petrol engine paired with a CVT, and 1.5-litre turbocharged petrol engine paired with 7-speed DCT.

==== Mexico ====
The MG5 was launched in Mexico in March 2022 as the MG GT, with three trim levels: Style, Excite, and Alpha. All variants are powered by a 1.5-litre turbocharged petrol engine paired with 7-speed DCT.

==== Middle East ====
The MG5 was launched in the Middle Eastern markets in October 2021 as the MG GT. It is offered in three trim levels; STD, COM and LUX. It is available in three variants with two engine options; a 1.5-litre petrol engine paired with 8-speed CVT transmission and a 1.5-litre turbocharged petrol engine paired with 7-speed DCT transmission.

The facelift model was launched in March 2026.

==== Southeast Asia ====
===== Brunei =====
The MG5 saloon was launched in Brunei in August 2023. Imported from China, it is offered in Deluxe variant, with two engine options in one variant are in 1.5-litre naturally-aspirated petrol engine paired with CVT, and 1.5-litre turbocharged petrol engine paired with 7-speed DCT.

===== Indonesia =====
The MG5 was launched in Indonesia at the 29th Indonesia International Motor Show on 31 March 2022. Imported from Thailand, three trim levels are available: Activate, Ignite, and Magnify. All variants are powered by a 1.5-litre SAIC 15S4C engine and comes only with a CVT.

===== Malaysia =====
The MG5 saloon was launched in Malaysia on 3 October 2024. Imported from Thailand, it is available in a sole variant powered by a 1.5-litre SAIC 15S4C engine paired with a CVT. In October 2025, the X Edition variant was made available limited to 300 units, it features a gloss black body kit, ‘X Edition’ scuff plates, and front and rear dash cameras.

===== Philippines =====
The MG5 was launched in the Philippines in February 2023 as the MG GT, with two trim levels: Magnify and Sport. All variants are powered by a 1.5-litre turbocharged petrol engine paired with 7-speed DCT.

===== Thailand =====
The MG5 was launched in July 2021 in Thailand, in four trim levels: C, D, D+, and X; powered by the 1.5-litre SAIC 15S4C engine. In March 2024, the Pro model was introduced in Thailand which comes in D and X trim levels, alongside the 100th Anniversary Special Edition.

===== Vietnam =====
The MG5 was launched in Vietnam on 3 March 2022, with three trim levels: Std+, Com+ and Lux+. All variants are powered by a 1.5-litre SAIC 15S4C engine and comes only with a CVT.

== Sales ==
Year	China		Thailand	Mexico
Year	MG5	Scorpio	Thailand	Mexico
2021			2,032	—
2022	74,612		11,121	7,658
2023	45,017	2,382	6,419	6,749
2024	45,164	534	3,149	3,055
2025	59,898	14		2,585

== Other versions ==
Since 2019, the MG5 nameplate is also used for a rebadged Roewe i5 for markets outside China due to the absence of the Roewe brand outside China. In markets outside Europe, the MG5 nameplate is used for the petrol-powered Roewe i5 saloon, while the original MG5 is marketed as the MG GT or MG5 GT.

In Europe, electric Roewe Ei5 estate was introduced in 2020 as the MG5 EV or MG5 SW EV. The MG 5 EV was marketed as the first ever electric estate car in the UK market and was launched alongside the plug-in hybrid version of the HS crossover.

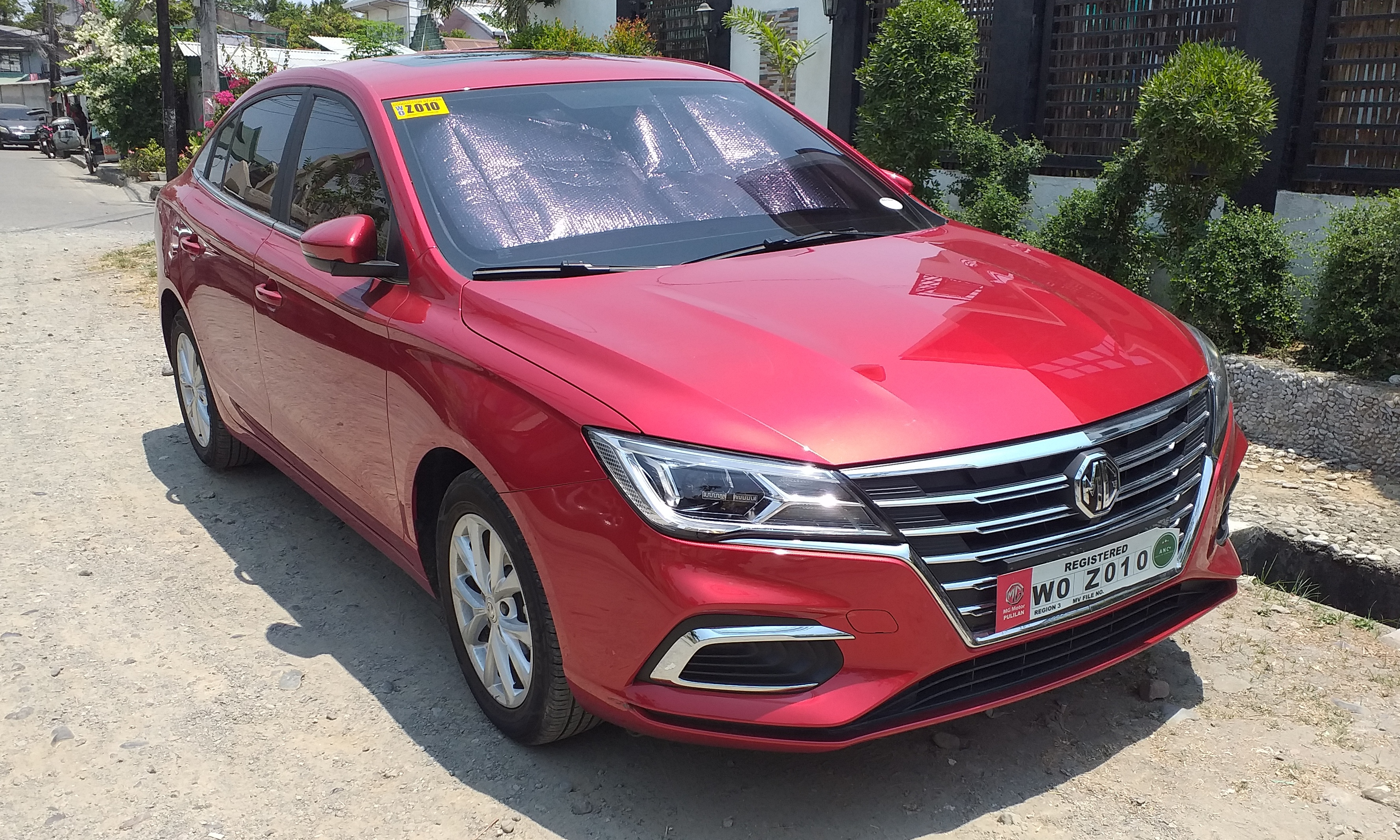
MG5 saloon (AP31)

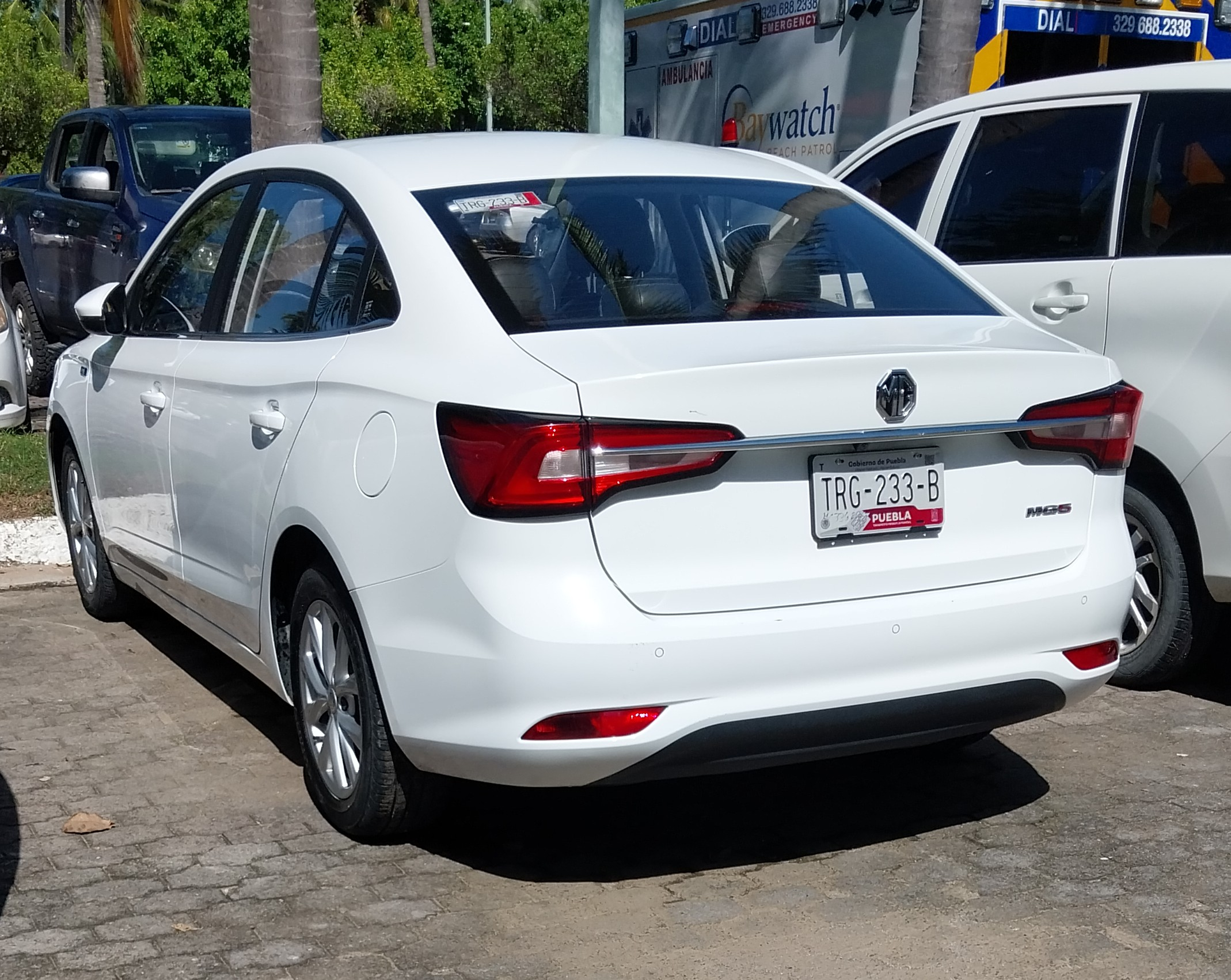
MG5 saloon (AP31)

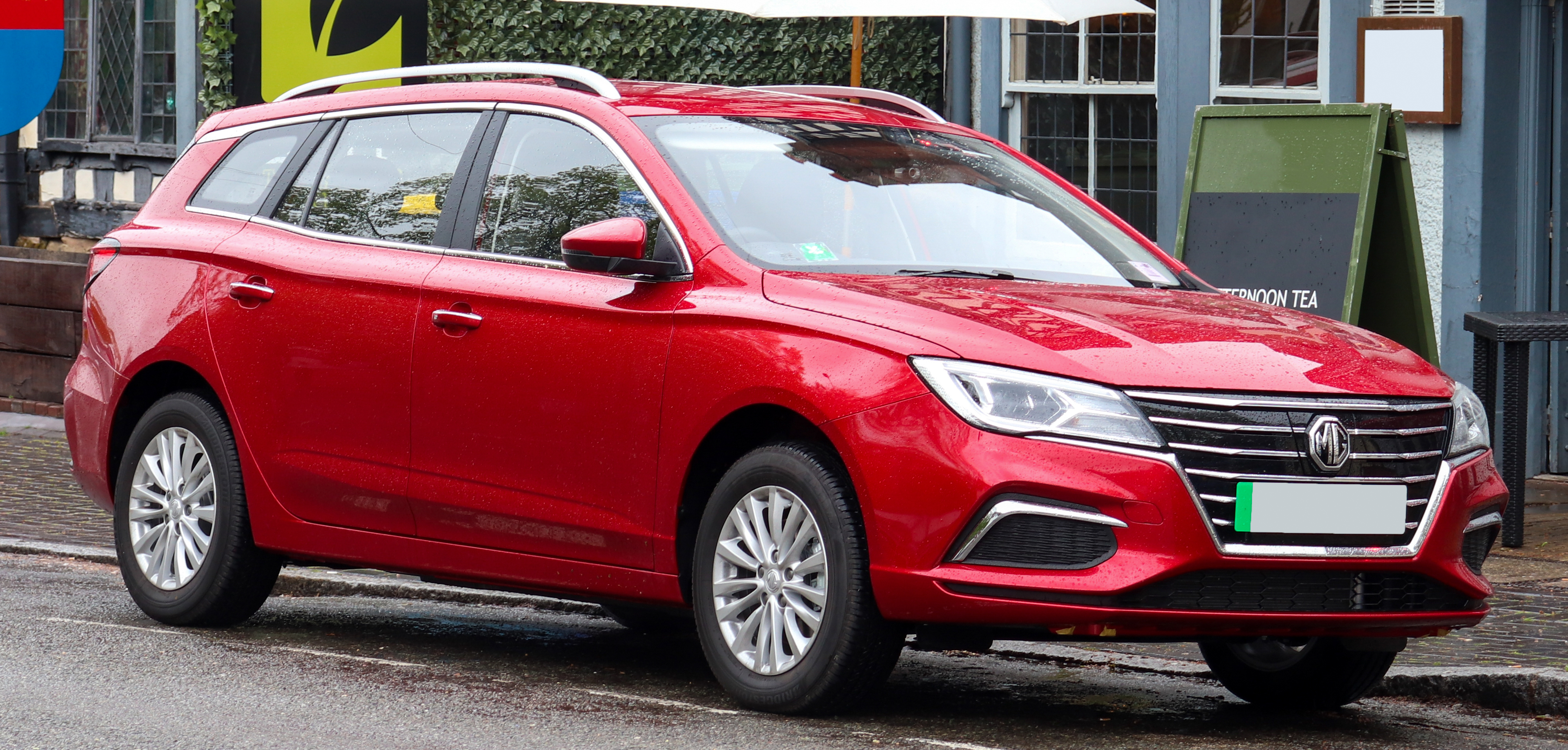
MG5 SW EV (EP22, pre-facelift)

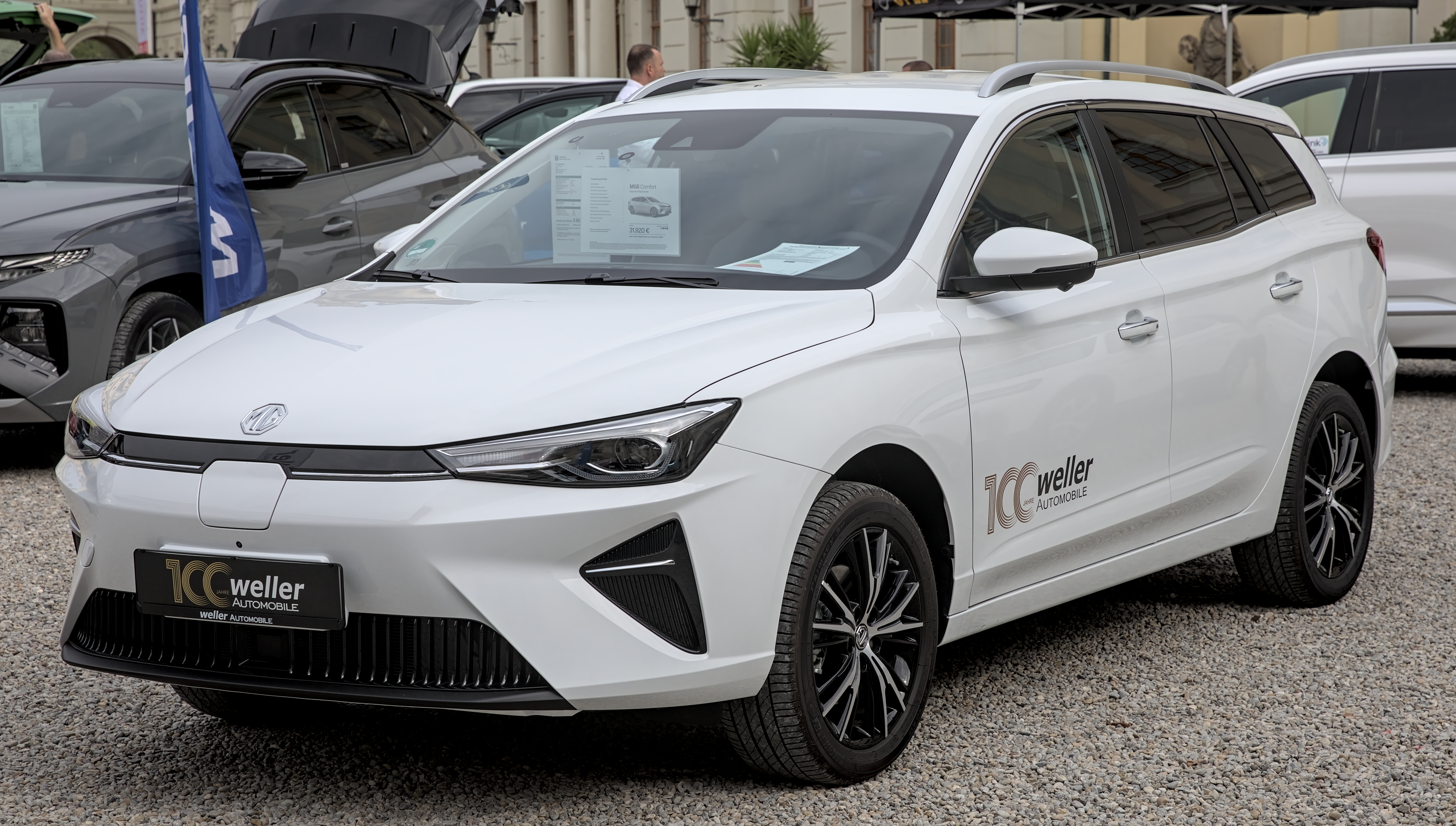
MG5 EV (EP22, facelift)
