= Steve Harper (designer) =

British designer

Stephen Harper in his studio

Stephen Joseph Harper (born August 1958) is a British designer who works primarily in the automotive industry. He is responsible for a number of cars including the MG F, Ford Escort RS Cosworth, and the 2010 Volvo C70. Founding design education took place at the Royal College of Art in London from 1979 to 1980, following earning an apprenticeship to the Austin Motor Company (a part of British Leyland) in Longbridge, Birmingham in 1978.

In his early days at Austin Rover Stephen worked on the Austin Montego, Rover 800 as well as a large number of unreleased cars, working at the Canley Studios in Coventry.

Stephen then moved to Volvo BV in the Netherlands to help with the Volvo 480 and Volvo 440 before returning to the UK to work for MGA. It was here that Stephen was responsible for the design of various Rolls-Royce, Bentley, Ford and with Rover Special products, creating the initial design for the MGF as well as a number of other niche Rovers that weren't released.

During that time, he also designed the Rediffusion Concept 90 generation of flight training simulators, as well as being, in 1989, the first European automotive designer to work in China.

In 1993, he established his own design consultancy SHADO Ltd (SHADO is the acronym of "Steve Harper Art & Design Organisation") as a Design Consultancy, as managing director, creating mobility scooters, entertainment ride simulators, commercial vehicles and sports cars, along with the vehicles for the MARS2112 restaurant, in New York. Stephen's 2nd secondment to Volvo (this time in Sweden) was in 2000, when he became influential in the creation of Volvo's post-millennial re-definition of the brand, being responsible for the design of a dozen production and concept cars for the company.

Returning to the UK in 2008, he was appointed a Senior Lecturer in Design at Coventry University and also established SHADO Design as a Design Consultancy, as managing director, this time in Paignton in Devon. There followed designs of a further influential flight training simulator for THALES, the 'Reality Seven', and works in Aerospace, Defence and Automotive fields.

In 2012 he joined SAIC in Shanghai and Tokyo developing the MG Icon concept car with the Chinese design team. While in China, following this, he helped establish the Geely Design Studio in Shanghai. Between 2014 and 2016, with a unique team of interns and post graduates, they created a pair of highly individual Electric Vehicle design and prototypes.

ThaiRung Union cars in Bangkok commissioned him to design a low volume 4x4 range of vehicles, the Transformer, and there also, developed a Diesel and EV Bus, to suit the Asian commuting requirements.

His passion for design has led to success in the creation of Design and Clay Modelling MasterClass Courses, which have seen students attending for all corners of the globe.

In 2017 his experience and knowledge in the field saw him appointed as a witness, establishing Stephen as an expert on Trademark and Design focused proceedings.

For two years, from mid-2018 to 2020, his role was to be the Creative Lead at Proton Holdings in Kuala Lumpur, Malaysia, as it integrated into the Geely portfolio of brands.

== Companies worked for ==
- Proton Holdings Malaysia (2018 – 2020)
- SHADO Ltd (2007-date)
- Volvo Cars Design Studio (2000–2008)
- Creative Automotive Design (1994–2000)
- SHADO Ltd (1993–2000)
- MGA Developments Ltd (1987–1993)
- SHADO (1986–1987)
- Volvo Cars BV (1985–1987)
- Austin-Rover Styling Studios (1978–1984)

== Notable designs ==
- Volvo
  - C70 (2010) Exterior & Interior Design + BPT
  - C30 (2010) Exterior & Interior Design Supervision + BPT
  - S40 (2007) Exterior & Interior Design + BPT
  - V50 (2007) Exterior & Interior Design + BPT
  - XC90 (2006)
  - S60 (2005)
  - S60R (2004)
  - S80 (2003) Interior Design & Exterior Design Supervision
  - Volvo ACC2 'XC70R' Concept Car (2003) Concept originator & Design Supervision.
  - Volvo ACC 'XC90' Concept Car (2002) Detroit. Exterior Design & Supervision.
  - Volvo PCC2 'V70R' Concept Car (2001) Frankfurt. Concept originator. Exterior & Interior Design
  - Volvo PCC 'S60R' Concept Car (2001) Paris. Concept originator. Exterior & Interior Design
- Ashok-Leyland
  - Ashok-Leyland Truck Cab Range Proposals (1999). Exterior Design
- Walt Disney Imagineering
  - Autopia Ride vehicle for Disneyland Paris (1990). Exterior Design
- Ford
  - Ford India – Seven Seat Crossover-Estate Car (based upon 'ICON) (1999). Exterior Design
  - Escort RS Cosworth Project (1989). Chief Exterior Designer
  - Galaxy MPV (VX62) Project (1988). Project Exterior Designer at VW/FORD Studio
  - Escort van (1990) Escort Van Project (1987). Project Exterior Designer
- DAF Trucks
  - DAF Trucks 45 and 55 Series Sleeper Cab (1997). Exterior & Interior Design.
- Bakrie
  - Bakrie Motors, Indonesia – Beta 97 MPV (1996). Exterior, Interior & Colour+Trim Design.
- ·Grinnall Cars
  - Grinnall – BMW motorcycle-based Scorpion 3 (1991), R1150 'Trike' (2002). Project Design
- Subaru
  - Legacy (2003) Legacy Estate. New Vehicle Concepts (1999). Exterior Design
- London Taxi International
  - ·London Taxi International (1997) TX1 Black Cab project (1992). Chief Exterior Designer
- Rolls-Royce
  - Silver Seraph/Bentley Arnage Project (1991).Chief Exterior Designer
  - Rolls-Royce – 1994 facelift of RR and Bentley models (1990). Chief Exterior Designer
- Rover
  - MGF 1995 MGF Sports car Project (1991). Chief Exterior Designer
- Aston Martin
  - DB7. Concept Design proposal (1992). Exterior Design
- SAIC
  - MG5 Project (2011). Chief Exterior Designer
  - MG ICON Concept Car (2012) Project Chief Designer
- Geely
  - Emgrand GT (2012) Chief Exterior Designer
  - Engrand GS (2013) Chief Exterior Designer
- Rediffusion Simulation
  - Concept 90 Flight Simulator (1990)
- THALES
  - Reality 7 Flight Simulator (2007)
- THAI RUNG UNION
  - Transformer 4x4 (2010)
- PROTON
  - R3 Editions of IRIZ and SAGA models (2019). Chief Design Manager
- IRIZ ACTIVE (2019) Chief Design Manager
- Austin Rover
  - Metro
  - Montego Estate
  - Metro
  - 800
