= Grinnall Scorpion =

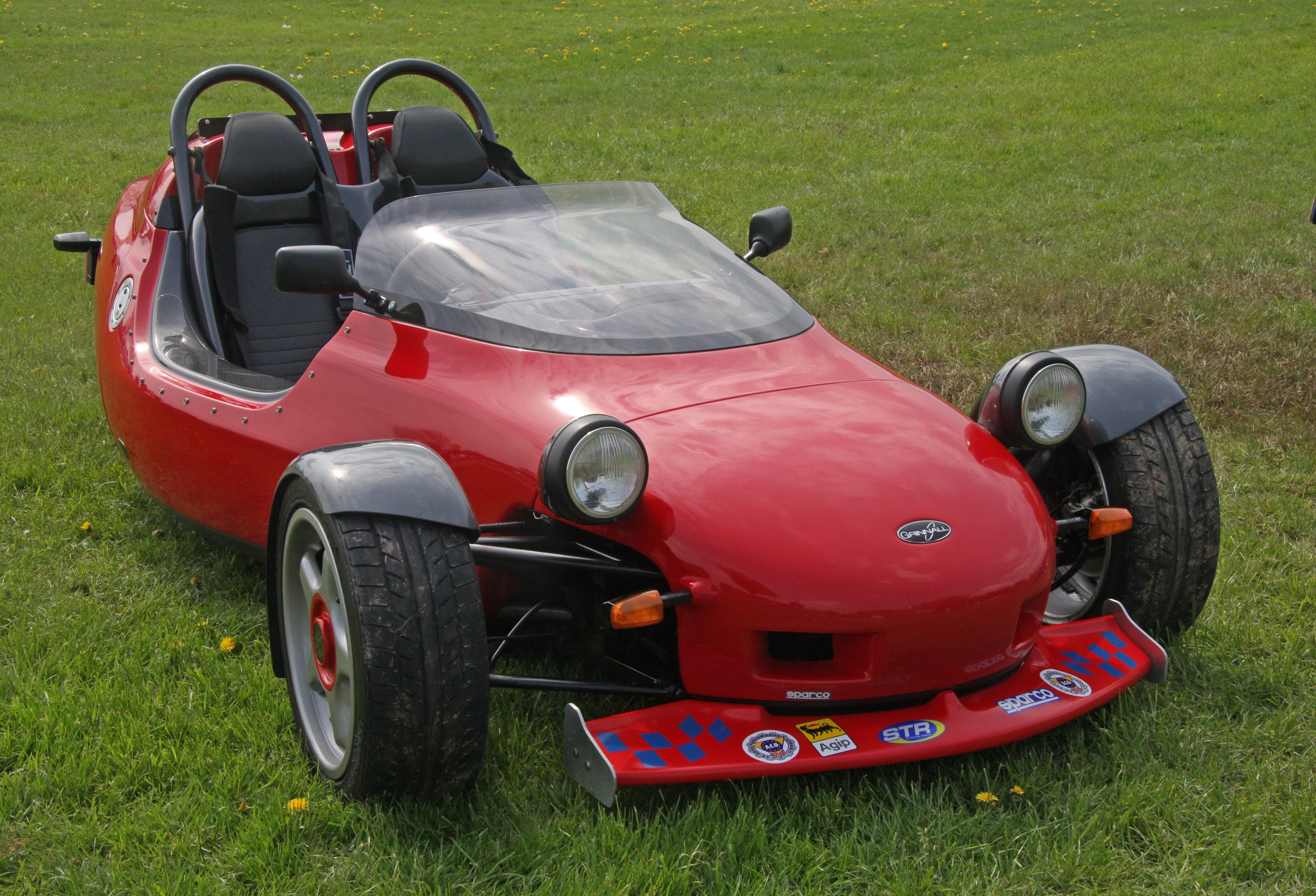

Overview
- Manufacturer: Grinnall Specialist Cars
- Designer: Steve Harper

The Grinnall Scorpion is a small-series sports car built by Grinnall Specialist Cars in England since 1992. Two models are available, the three-wheeled Scorpion III and the four-wheeled Scorpion IV, with the Roman numerals referring to the number of wheels rather than being mark designators. The III is fitted with BMW motorcycle engines, while the IV is typically equipped with automobile engines from Audi.

== Scorpion III ==
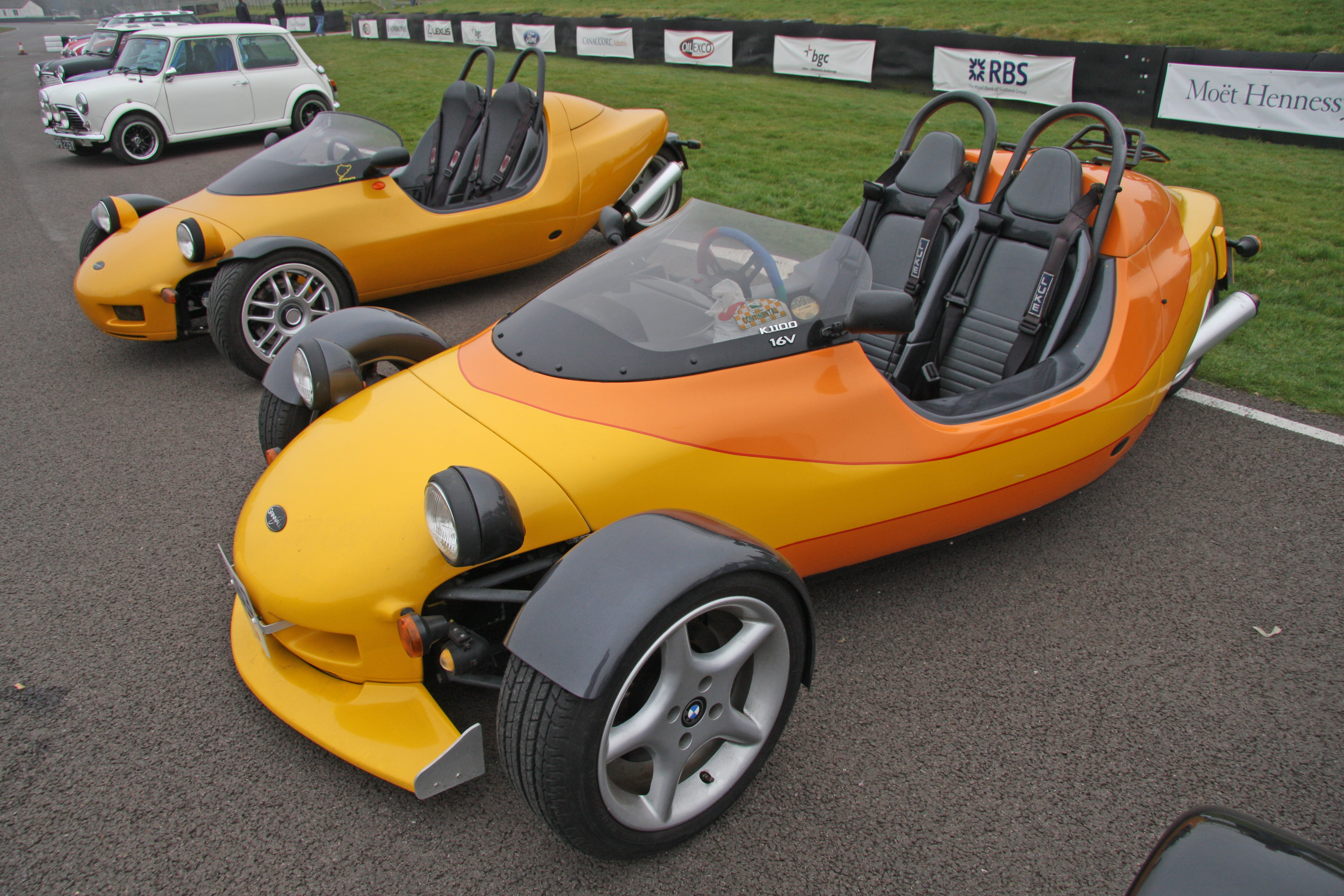
Grinnall Scorpion III

The Grinnall Scorpion III is a reverse trike, with two wheels at the front and one at the rear, which is a better-handling configuration than one wheel at the front. Designed in 1991 by Steve Harper, the Scorpion III features a GRP body tub which is bonded to a space frame chassis underneath, and employs a BMW K-series motorcycle engine as its power plant. The engine, gearbox and final drive from the motorcycle are utilised with a special rear wheel which is fitted with a car tyre, as are the front wheels. It has a very good power-to-weight ratio which endows it with excellent performance. The rear wheel is of a smaller circumference than the bike's wheel so the gearing is optimised for a lower top speed of around 125 mph (201 km/h) with 0-60 mph (97 km/h) taking around 6 seconds when using a K1100 engine. Any BMW K engine can be used, from a 750 cc 3-cylinder, to a 1200 cc, 4-cylinder, giving power outputs from 75 bhp (56 kW) to 130 bhp (97 kW).

The motorcycle sequential gearchange is retained and operated via a gear shift inside the cockpit and requires a forward or backward movement to change gear. The brake, accelerator and clutch operate as per a car and are adjustable for reach to accommodate drivers of different size. The seat and steering wheel are fixed in position.

There are two seats, and there is provision above the engine to accommodate some luggage which is roughly equivalent to two sports bags. Handling is generally considered to be good due to the low centre of gravity and wide front track (approx 6 ft (1.8 m)) although care is needed when roads are wet.

A turbocharged engine kit is available from BBR racing, which increases power to around 300 bhp (224 kW; 304 PS) for the 1100 cc engine.

The trikes are sold as complete kits with everything needed to finish including washers, ty-wraps etc. or as completed vehicles. They are essentially recreational vehicles which offer high performance but lack the practicality of a conventional car.

In 2008 Grinnall offered the Scorpion III with the BMW K40 engine which Grinnall claims is producing over 167 bhp (125 kW; 169 PS) at the rear wheel.

== Scorpion IV ==
The Grinnall Scorpion IV is a car made by Grinnall Specialist Cars. It was designed by Steve Harper to be essentially similar in appearance to the Scorpion III but with an extra wheel and slightly larger dimensions. The Scorpion IV is an open sports car constructed from fibreglass covered steel with a space frame chassis. Power is provided by an Audi 1.8-litre turbocharged petrol engine driving a 6-speed gearbox. The standard engine produces 225 hp (165 kW) but this can be tuned to provide more and Grinnall offer options to increase this to over 300 bhp (220 kW). (Note: Grinnall only quotes computer-simulated acceleration figures at present and these are 0-60 mph 3.7s; 0-100 mph 7.9s; and 30-70 mph 2.7s. Midrange acceleration was predicted to be 40-80 mph in 3rd in 3.1sec, 40-100 mph in 4th in 6.8sec)

== See also ==
- Campagna T-Rex - a similar Canadian three wheeler
- List of motorized trikes
