= Skorpion =

Skorpion may refer to:

== Military ==
- Škorpion a Czechoslovak machine pistol
- Skorpion-3, a Polish multi-purpose off-road vehicle
- PZL-230 Skorpion, a cancelled Polish attack jet

== Other uses ==
- Skorpion (TV series), a 1983 British drama serial
- "Skorpion", a 2010 song by Urban Symphony
- Skorpion Zinc, a zinc mine in Namibia
- Krzysztof Gawlik (born 1965), nicknamed "Skorpion", Polish serial killer active in 2001
- Paweł Tuchlin (1946–1987), nicknamed "Skorpion", Polish serial killer active 1975–1983

== See also ==
- Skorpionen-class monitor, three ships of the Royal Norwegian Navy
- Skorpionite, a mineral
- Scorpion (disambiguation)
