= MG GT =

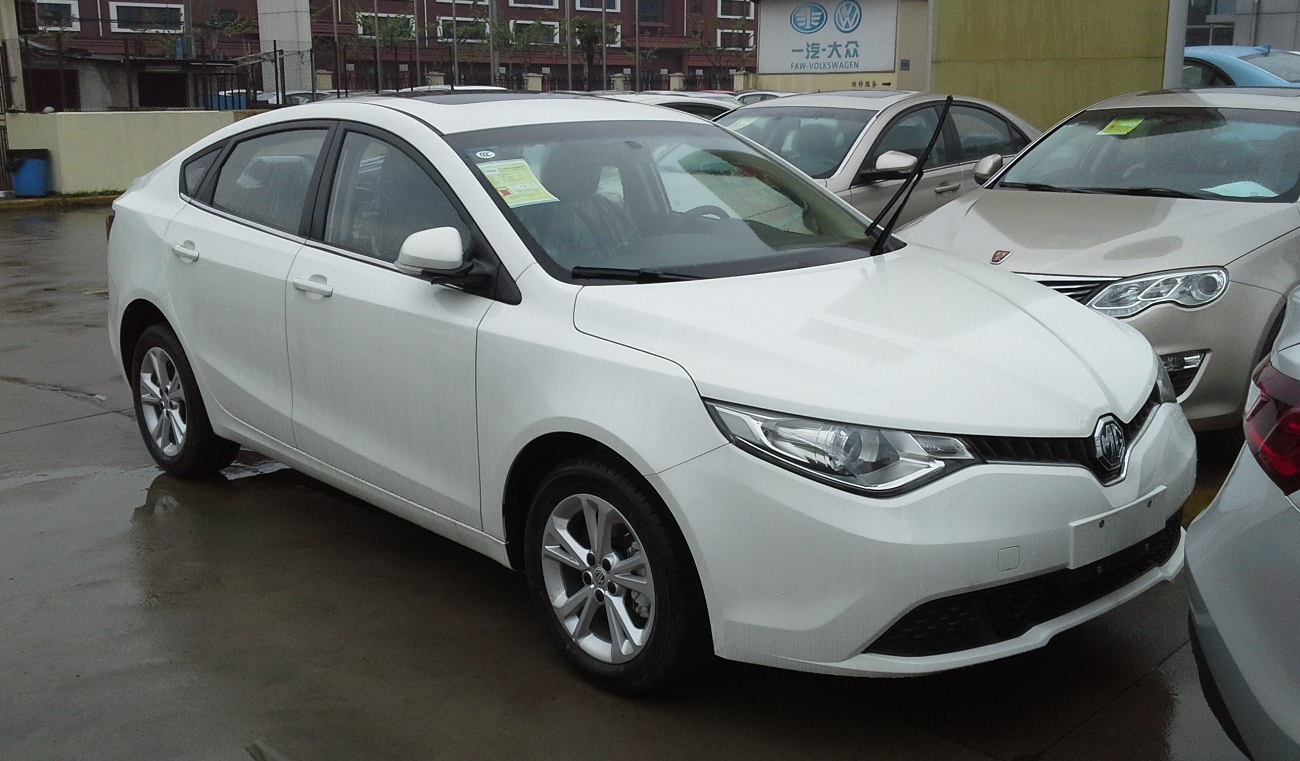

Overview
- Manufacturer: SAIC Motor
- Model code: AP13
- Production: 2014–2019
- Assembly: China: Pukou, Nanjing; Thailand: Laem Chabang (SAIC-CP)

Body and chassis
- Class: Compact car (C)
- Body style: 4-door saloon car
- Layout: Front-engine, front-wheel-drive
- Related: MG 5 Roewe 360

Powertrain
- Engine: Petrol: 1.4 L I4; 1.5 L 15S4C VTi-Tech I4; 1.5 L 15S4G TCI-TECH I4 turbo

Dimensions
- Wheelbase: 2,650 mm (104.3 in)
- Length: 4,612 mm (181.6 in)
- Width: 1,855 mm (73.0 in)
- Height: 1,488 mm (58.6 in)
- Kerb weight: 1,473–1,539 kg (3,247–3,393 lb)

Chronology
- Predecessor: MG ZS
- Successor: MG5 (second generation)

The MG GT is a compact car produced by SAIC Motor under the MG marque from 2014 to 2019.

== First generation (2014) ==
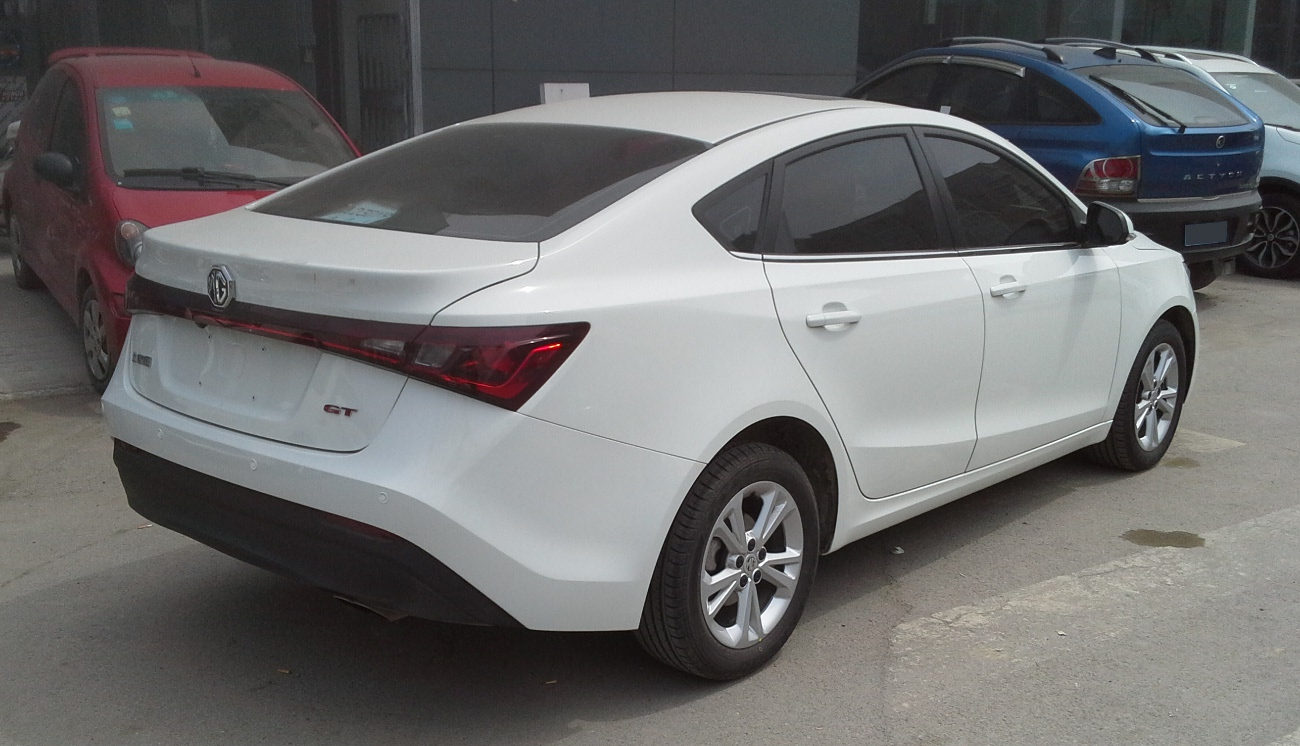
MG GT (rear).

In July 2014, MG extended its offer with a compact saloon car called the GT, which was developed on the basis of the MG 5 hatchback as its three-box version with a separate body styling. The car has avant-garde body styling, with aggressively shaped headlights, as well as a gently sloping roofline towards the rear, crowned by a one-piece strip of lights extending the entire width of the body. In the passenger compartment, MG applied a more subdued design than in the case of the body, led by a massive central console dominated by a centrally located multimedia system display. It is equipped with an infotainment system, as well as connectivity with 3G, the internet and satellite TV, in addition to screen control, enabling operation via a button panel.

Initially, the GT was offered only with a 154-horsepower (115 kW; 156 PS) 1.4-litre (85 cu in) four-cylinder petrol engine, while in 2015, the offer was also expanded by two larger 1.5-litre (92 cu in) units with 109 horsepower (81 kW; 111 PS) and a more powerful, turbocharged engine, developing 129 horsepower (96 kW; 131 PS).

=== Markets ===
The GT was built with the Chinese market in mind, where its sale began in November 2014. In addition, sales and production from Thailand began in 2015 under the name MG 5, while in 2016, the vehicle was exported to Chile.

The production of GT lasted for 5 years, ending in the first half of 2019. The following year, MG introduced the new compact saloon in the form of the second generation 5.

== Second generation (2021) ==
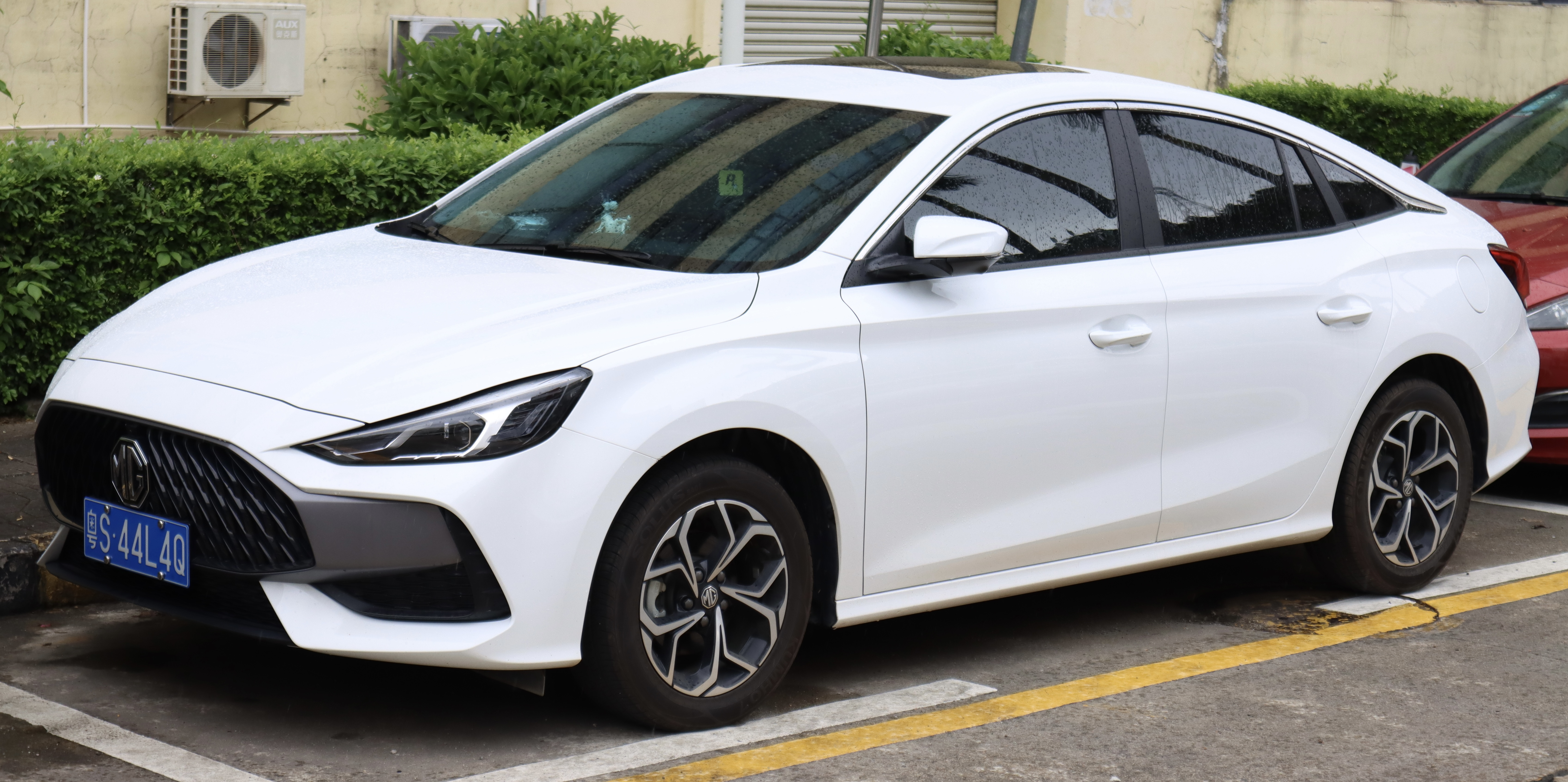
2020 MG5

The second-generation MG GT is a rebadged second-generation MG 5 for the Middle East, Latin America, and the Philippines.
