= Scorpio =

Scorpio is the Latin word for scorpion. It most often refers to:

- Scorpio (astrology), a sign of the Zodiac
- Scorpius, a constellation often called Scorpio

The term Scorpio may also refer to:

== People ==
- 2 Cold Scorpio, a professional wrestler
- D.C. Scorpio, a hip-hop recording artist
- Eddie Morris (rapper), a member of the hip-hop group Grandmaster Flash and the Furious Five, nicknamed Scorpio
- Scorpio Sky, a professional wrestler

== Arts, entertainment, and media ==
=== Fictional characters ===
- Scorpio (Marvel Comics), a Marvel Comics supervillain
- Scorpio (DC Comics), DC Comics terrorist organization
- Scorpio, the heroes' fictional spacecraft in the final season of the TV series Blake's 7
- The Scorpio Killer, the antagonist in the 1971 film Dirty Harry
- Scorpios rex, a hybrid dinosaur introduced in the 3rd season of the Netflix show Jurassic World Camp Cretaceous
- Hank Scorpio (voiced by Albert Brooks), a character in the episode "You Only Move Twice" of The Simpsons
- Robert Scorpio (played by Tristan Rogers), a character on the American soap opera General Hospital

=== Music ===
- Scorpio (Arthur Jones album), 1971
- Scorpio (Bill Anderson album), 1977
- "Scorpio" (Grandmaster Flash and The Furious Five song), one of the original founding members and is a song recorded by Grandmaster Flash and The Furious Five
- "Scorpio" (instrumental), a song recorded by Dennis Coffey
- "Scorpio" (Moneybagg Yo song), a song recorded by Moneybagg Yo
- "Scorpio" (Trax song), a song recorded by Korean rock band The TRAX
- "Scorpios", a song by Adam and the Ants from Prince Charming

=== Other uses in arts, entertainment, and media ===
- Scorpio (film), a 1973 spy film starring Burt Lancaster and Alain Delon
- "Scorpio" (Flashpoint), the pilot for the TV series Flashpoint

== Vehicles ==
- Ford Scorpio, a car
- Mahindra Scorpio, an Indian SUV
- Mahindra Scorpio Getaway a pickup truck
- Scorpio ROV, a class of submersible remotely operated vehicle, including the Scorpio II and Super Scorpio operated by the US and UK navies

== Other uses ==
- Scorpio (genus), a genus of scorpions in the family Scorpionidae
- Scorpio (weapon), an artillery weapon used in Ancient Rome
- Scorpio, the codename for version 8 of the ColdFusion application server
- Project Scorpio, the codename for the Xbox One X video game console
- Scourge, a Roman whip
- Task Force Scorpio, a United Nations biological and chemical response team

== See also ==
- Skorpio (DC Comics), a DC Comics supervillain
- Skorpio (magazine), an Argentine comics magazine
