= Ford Escort RS Cosworth =

Rally homologation special of the fifth generation European Ford Escort

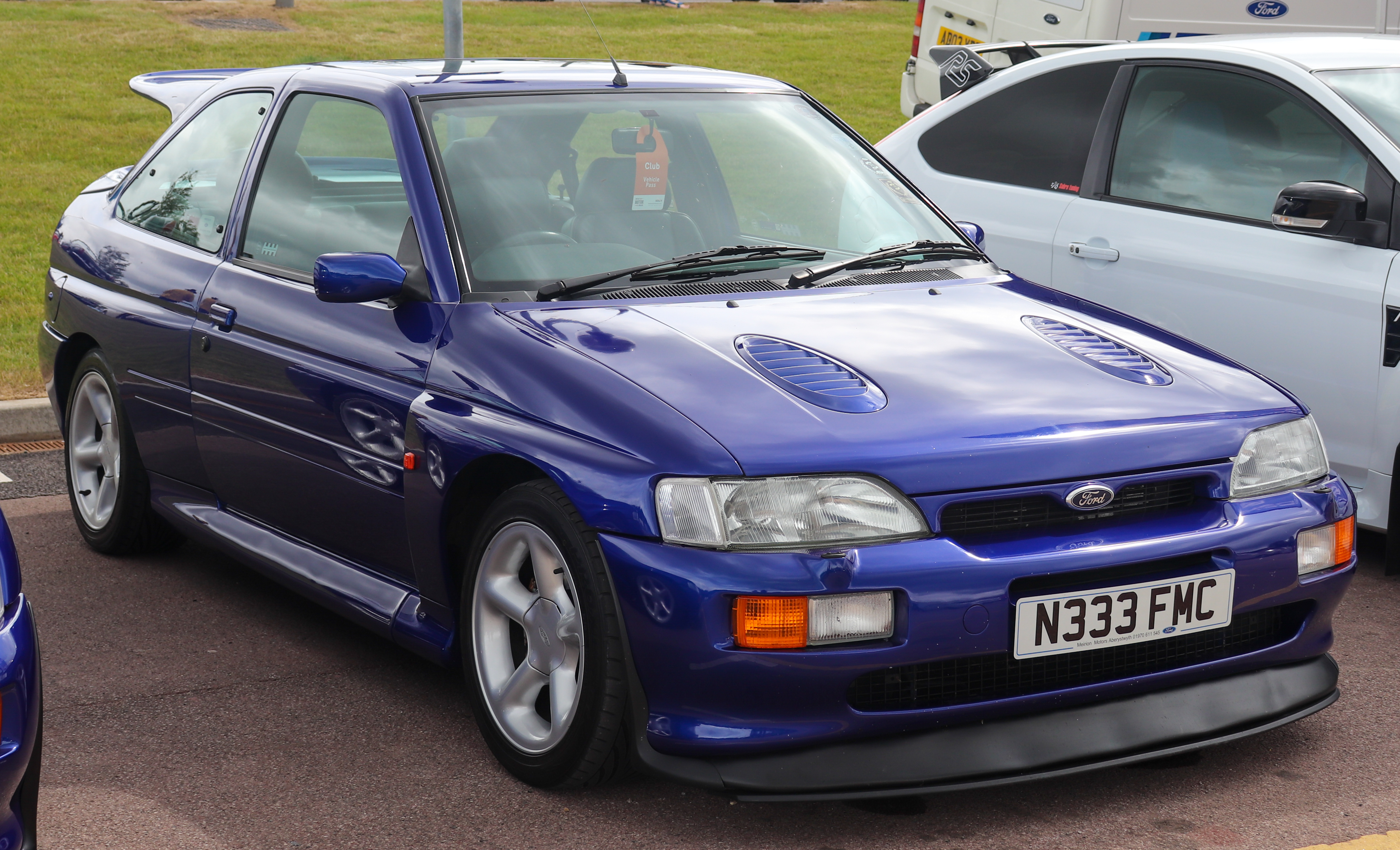

Overview
- Manufacturer: Ford Europe
- Production: February 1992 – January 1996; 7,145 produced
- Assembly: Germany: Rheine (Karmann)
- Designer: Steve Harper; John Wheeler

Body and chassis
- Class: Rally car Hot hatch
- Body style: 3-door hatchback
- Layout: Longitudinal, Front-engine, four-wheel-drive
- Related: Ford Sierra RS Cosworth

Powertrain
- Engine: 1,993 cc Cosworth YBT turbo I4 (1992–1994); 1,993 cc Cosworth YBP turbo I4 (1994–1996)
- Transmission: 5-speed Ferguson MT-75 manual

Dimensions
- Wheelbase: 2,552 mm (100.5 in)
- Length: 4,211 mm (165.8 in)
- Width: 1,738 mm (68.4 in)
- Height: 1,405 mm (55.3 in)
- Kerb weight: 1,275–1,310 kg (2,811–2,888 lb) (Lux edition)

Chronology
- Predecessor: Ford Sierra RS Cosworth
- Successor: Ford Focus RS

The Ford Escort RS Cosworth is a homologation special of the fifth generation European Ford Escort. It was designed to qualify as a Group A car for the World Rally Championship in which it competed between 1993 and 1998. It was available as a road car from 1992 until 1996. The powertrain was only fitted to this version of the Escort, a longitudinally mounted Cosworth YBT, a highly tunable turbocharged 2.0 L (1,993 cc) inline-four engine which had an output of 227 PS (167 kW; 224 bhp) in standard trim.

== Development ==
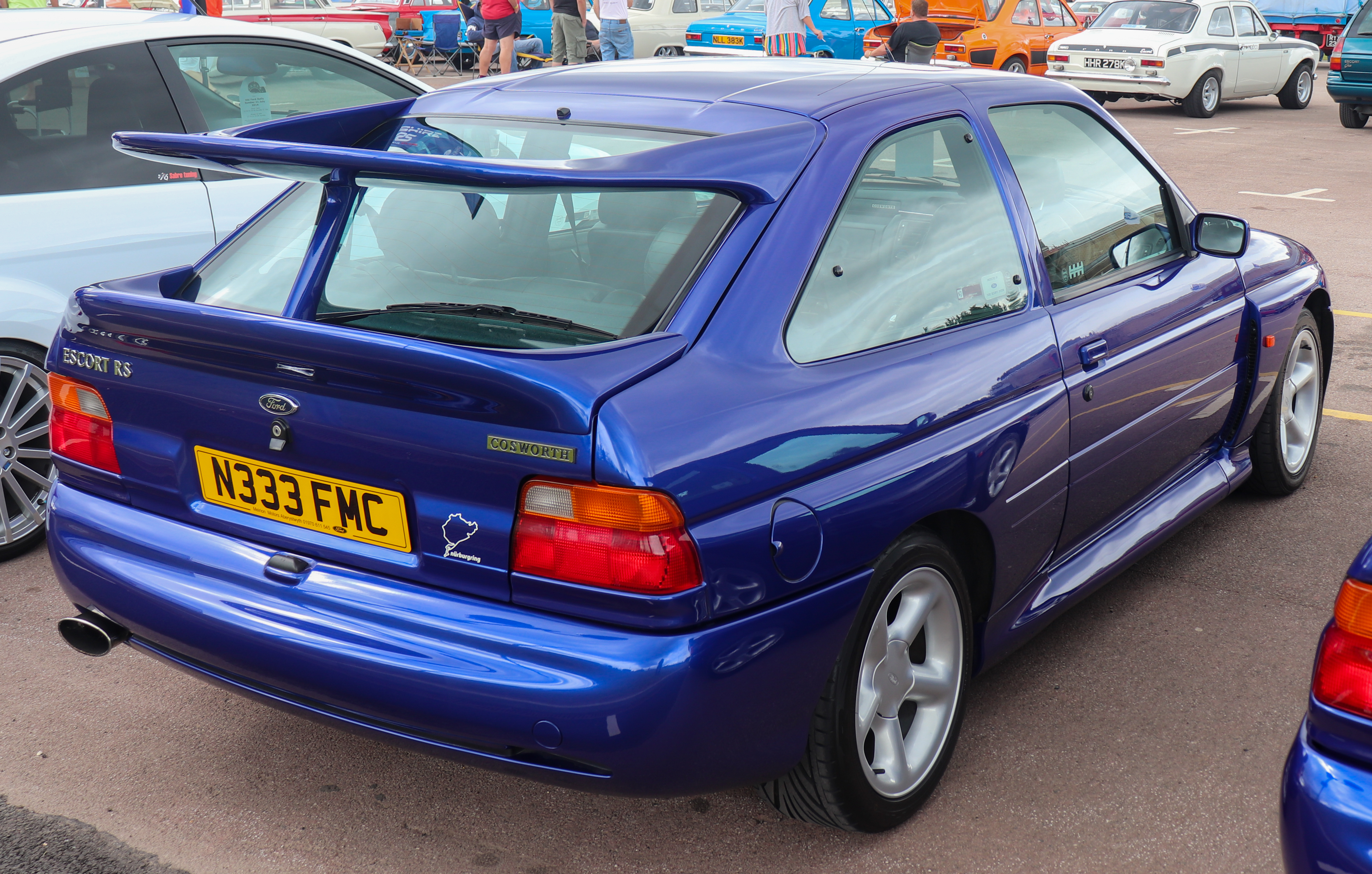
Rear, showing "whale-tail" wing

Ford developed the car around the chassis and mechanicals of the Sierra Cosworth, to accommodate the larger Cosworth engine and transmission, while clothing it in Escort body panels to make it resemble the standard Mk 5 Ford Escort, although the front doors and roof are the only bodyshell elements that are actually interchangeable. This accommodation was required as the floor pan of the regular Mk 5 Escort was designed for front-wheel-drive only initially (although a four-wheel drive version, the RS2000 4x4, was soon introduced). Designed under the guidance of Rod Mansfield and John Wheeler of Ford's SVO department, the styling was designed during 1989, a year before the standard Escort was launched, by Stephen Harper at MGA Developments in Coventry. The aerokit (front and rear spoilers) was designed by MGA with oversight by John Wheeler, whilst the ride and handling was overseen by John Bull and Mick Kelly. The body tooling was created by coachbuilders Karmann at their facility in Rheine, Germany, where the cars were manufactured.

Changes were made to the engine management system and a new turbocharger was fitted. Permanent four-wheel drive with a 34/66% front/rear split came courtesy of an uprated five-speed gearbox as used in the Sierra Cosworth. Like its Sierra predecessor, they are commonly nicknamed "Cossies" by enthusiasts.

In total 7,145 vehicles were produced from the start of production on 19 February 1992 until the last car rolled out of the factory on 12 January 1996. A small number were officially imported to the United States by a third party.

The car's top speed was 150 mph (240 km/h), rivalling cars like the Audi Coupé S2, BMW M3, Nissan 300ZX, Toyota Supra and Porsche 968 and comfortably outperforming traditional "hot hatchbacks" like the Volkswagen Golf GTI.

Two main versions were produced; The initial 2,500 units were "homologation specials" used to fulfil FIA accreditation for Group A and were completed by January 1, 1993. These vehicles were fitted with a Garrett T3/T04B Hybrid turbo and air/water intercooler (this is a hybrid consisting of a Garrett T04B compressor wheel combined with a Garrett T3 turbine, also known as T34). All of the 2,500 homologation cars included the water injection system under the rear passenger seat. This was non-functioning and was in place to demonstrate water injection capability for the Group A regulations.

Due to high demand, Ford kept the large turbo version in production until June 1994 even though the homologation number of 2,500 had been fulfilled.

From June 1994, the second generation model was produced featuring a smaller Garrett T25 turbocharger and a revised engine management system; the original Weber-Marelli IAW P8 installation was replaced by Ford EEC IV. The ignition system now came with a single coil per cylinder compared to the static ignition arrangement found in the original version (no distributor was used). To improve cooling, larger piston oil squirters were fitted. Although the peak power was reduced by 5 PS (6 bhp; 3 KW), these changes aided drivability for non-competitive use.

The "small turbo" models can be visually identified with a black and silver camshaft & ignition coil cover as opposed to the blue of the larger turbo model and are known as YPT. Production stopped in early 1996 as the model was unable to meet new EU drive-by noise regulations.

== Performance ==
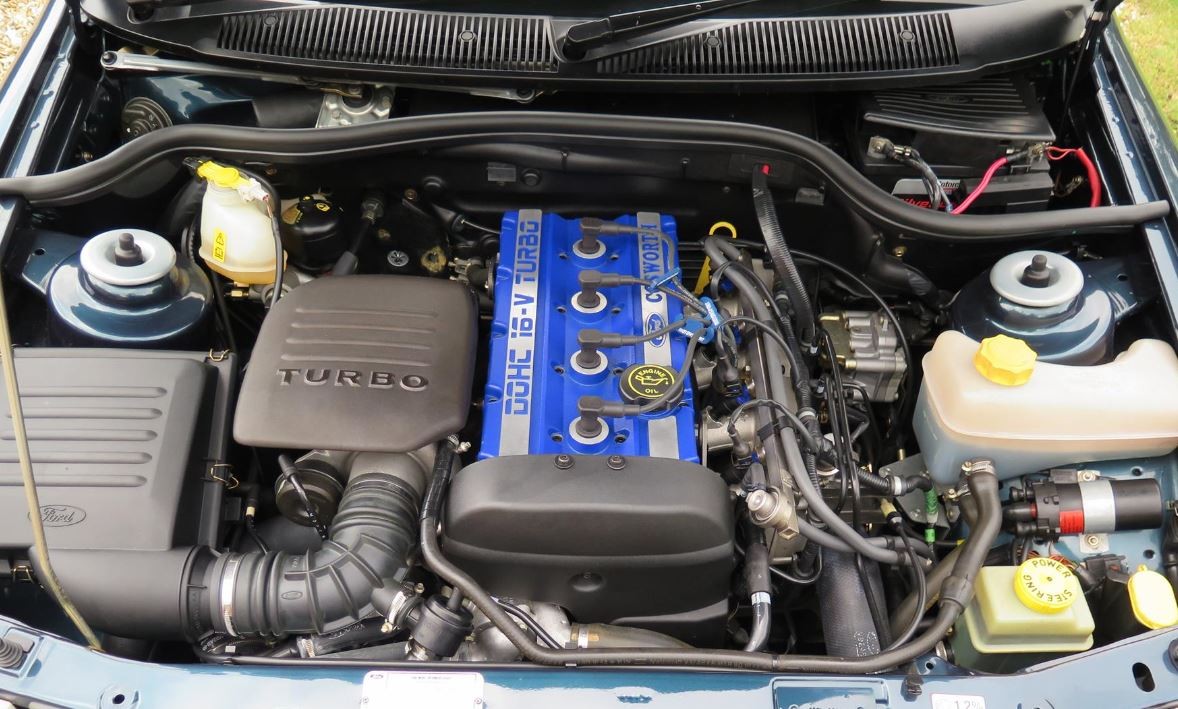
Escort Cosworth engine YBT T34

The 2.0 L Cosworth YBT engine has a bore x stroke of 90.8 mm × 77 mm (3.57 in × 3.03 in). Maximum power officially from Ford was 227 PS (224 bhp; 167 kW) at 6,250 rpm and 304 N⋅m; 224 lbf⋅ft (31 kg⋅m) of torque at 3,500 rpm on 95 RON petrol and a max speed of 232 km/h (144 mph) (GPS) and 237 km/h (147 mph) without the big rear wing, while 0–100 km/h (62 mph) takes 5.7 sec. Standard boost from Garrett AiResearch T3/T04B turbocharger was 0.8 bar (12 psi) with 1.0-1.1 bar overboost. Tuning companies have achieved power outputs in excess of 1,000 bhp (746 kW; 1,014 PS). The car weight was 1,275 kg (2,811 lb) or 1,310 kg (2,890 lb) for the Lux edition.

The Escort RS Cosworth was the first mass production car to produce downforce at the front and rear; 4.6 kg/45 Newtons at 180 km/h (110 mph) at the front with an adjustable front splitter in the middle position and 19.4 kg/190Newtons at the rear with the rear large wing.

== Road variations ==
Three variations could be purchased; Motorsport Base, Standard and Lux (Luxury).

=== Motorsport Base ===
The Motorsport Base enabled customers to purchase a basic road car and self-prep for rallying and were the first cars off the production line. All cars were Diamond White featuring grey polaris cloth hexagon pattern seats. Equipment such as; electric windows, electric mirrors, electric boot release, radio, sunroof, central locking, fog lamps, air conditioning, opening rear quarter windows, rear headrest, under seal and some sound deadening was omitted from the build. Additionally the body was strengthened in key areas (front and rear suspension mounts) along with the fuel pump access panel riveted, not welded in place. Motorsport versions include a 'Motorsport" stamped VIN plate. Kerb weight was 40 kg lower. The initial 2,500 homologation cars built with the non-functioning water injection kit are all Motorsport Base spec.

Also offered was the 'Motorsport Shell 909' option which could be ordered though Ford Motorsport along with all Group A & N parts for customers who wanted to build a car from a base shell or required spares. These shells had brackets removed, strengthening plates installed, seam welded and had a roll cage fitted. Ford Motorsport produced 937 of these ready prepared shells.

=== Standard & Lux ===
The Standard version was more civilised with additional options available that were unavailable on the Motorsport base; electric windows, sunshine roof, central locking, remote boot release, carpeted door bins. From 1994 the 'whale tail' spoiler could be deleted from the factory however it is unknown how many buyers chose this option. A drivers and passenger airbag became available from 1994 onwards.

The Lux model offered further options not available on the Motorsport or Standard model. These included CD player, air conditioning, electric sunroof, electric heated door mirrors, Quick-clear heated windscreen, heated washer jets, a three-spoke leather covered steering wheel, carpeted door bins, a rear seat armrest, opening rear quarter windows, heated headlight washer jets, leather seats. Although switch blanks were present for heated seats, the option was never available for the Recaro seats.. The Lux pack was available as a full option pack towards the later years.

All small turbo models are either Standard or Lux variants.

=== Special editions ===
- Monte Carlo: To celebrate the victory in the 1994 Monte Carlo rally, Ford created the Monte Carlo edition for the UK market. This was available in three colours, Ash Black, Mallard Green and only for this edition, Jewel Violet with an estimated 200 produced total. The differences to a standard car were: 8 x16 OZ Racing Wheels, Monte Carlo stickers on the wings and tailgate, Recaro motorsport seats with 'Motorsport' logo on the inner bolsters, alloy gear knob and chrome brake handle button. They were otherwise mechanically unchanged.
- Miki Biasion: This was Italian market only, launched in 1992 with a production run of 120. Each car came with a numbered plaque on the dashboard with Miki Biasion's signature. All were Motorsport Base spec; Diamond White non-sunroof bodies, hexagon trimmed seats, manual windows, no radio and no electric boot release. These 120 units were part of the original 2,500 homologation run and included the non-functioning water spray system.
- Motorsport Edition: Different from the Motorsport Base, it was released in 1994 for the Italian market and was visually similar to the Monte Carlo, including the same 8x16 OZ Racing Wheels. All cars were ash black and featured full electrics pack and air conditioning
- Martini Racing Edition: Limited to 200 models, this was produced to celebrate the partnership between Ford and one of its main sponsors.
- Acropolis Edition: Only one was built out of a planned 200. The car was yellow with black bonnet vents and Acropolis graphics with yellow wheels, built to celebrate Miki Biasion's 1993 Acropolis Rally victory.
- Arrows F1 Escort: Limited edition produced for the Japanese market by Brooklyn Motorsport as part of a marketing tie-in with the Arrows F1 team. All were base white with a graphics pack (emulating the 1995 Footwork FA16-Hart driven by Taki Inoue/Morbidelli/Papis), Morette headlights, Enkei 5-spoke wheels and an ECU remap taking power to 265 PS (195 kW). Also included was a 1:43 model car and Sergio Tacchini apparel. Out of a planned run of 25, it is estimated that only ten examples were built.
- Wolf Edition: Produced by German Ford Works Racing Team and Ford Sales Handler as well as reputable Ford tuner Wolf Tuning of Germany (also known as Walter Wolf Racing) these had numerous modification such as uprated fuel injectors, fuel pump, intercooler, ECU, Bilstein or Eibach suspension, 300 km/h gauges. Power output was 300 PS at 6250rpm

=== Build numbers ===
- 1992 - 3448
- 1993 - 1143
- 1994 - 1180
- 1995 - 1306
- 1996 - 68

== Motorsport ==
=== Rally ===
The rationale behind the Escort RS Cosworth's design was that it should win the World Rally Championship. It did not achieve that goal, but it did win eight events between 1993 and 1996 as a Group A car, and two more in World Rally Car guise in 1997, before being replaced by the Focus RS WRC.

The Escort RS Cosworth was developed by the Ford Works Rally Team during late 1990, 1991 and 1992. Its first appearances, before homologation, were in the Spanish championship in late 1990, in the hands of José María Bardolet where it won its first competitive rally, Rally Talavera 1990 and on the 1992 Scottish Rally, where it was driven by Malcolm Wilson who was also the lead development driver. Wilson was not formally competing in the event, but his stage times were faster than those of the winner Colin McRae. During the latter part of the 1992 season, development of the Sierra Cosworth came to an end, and the works team drivers Francois Delecour and Miki Biasion concentrated on readying the Escort for competition.

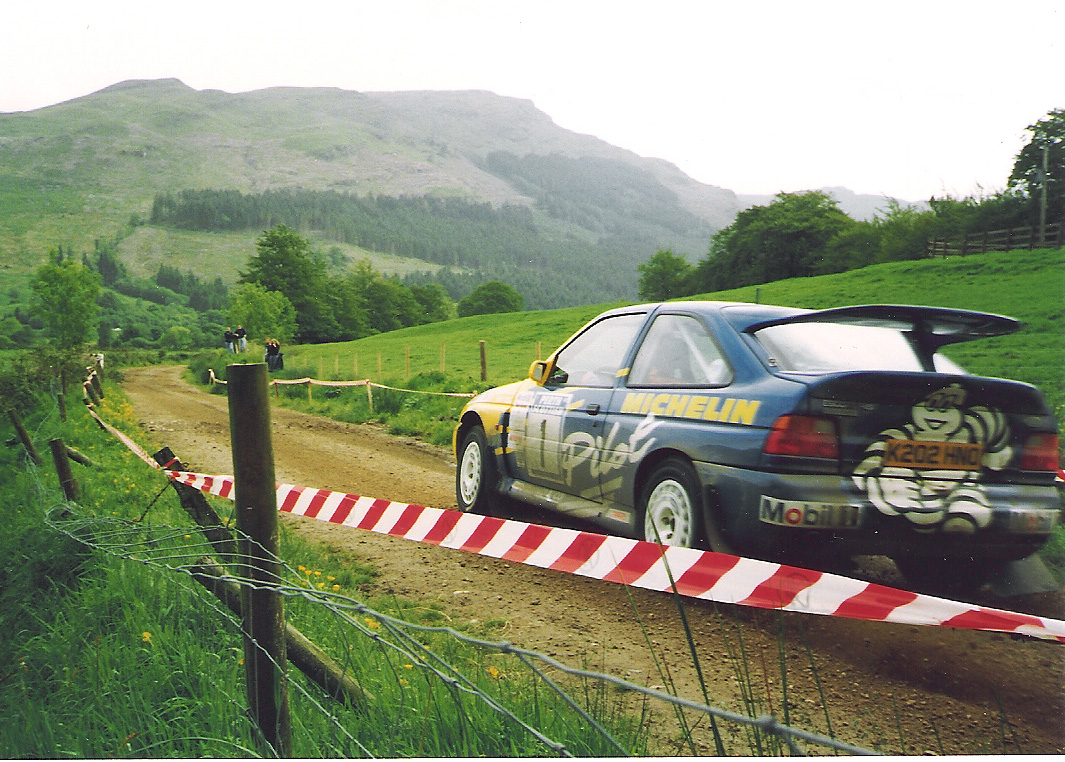
A Ford Escort RS Cosworth on a stage rally, driven by British driver Malcolm Wilson.

On the Escort's first outing at World Championship level, the 1993 Monte Carlo Rally, Delecour took the lead with Biasion second. The pair led the event until the final night, when a late charge by Didier Auriol, driving a Toyota Celica, saw him win, with the Fords second and third. Nevertheless, the new car had demonstrated its potential, which was underlined the following month when Malcolm Wilson, driving a car prepared by his own team, briefly led the Swedish Rally before retiring after an accident. The works team returned for the Portuguese Rally, Delecour led almost from the start and won the event with Biasion second, establishing both car and driver as serious contenders for that year's World Championship. Delecour won again in Corsica, and Biasion in Greece – his first win for three years – putting them first and second in the drivers' championship, and Ford in the joint lead in the manufacturers' title.

During the second half of the season, Toyota driver Juha Kankkunen won in Argentina, Finland and Australia, but in New Zealand, with the exception of Delecour's second place (behind Colin McRae) the Fords' results were relatively poor, giving Toyota the manufacturers' title. Both works Escorts retired on the San Remo Rally, Delecour's after an accident and Biasion's with engine failure after a radiator hose split, but the event was won by Italian Franco Cunico, in a privately entered Escort RS Cosworth. It was the first time in several years that a privateer had won at this level, and in doing so he outpaced the works Lancia Delta Integrale of reigning World Champion Carlos Sainz, demonstrating the superiority of the Escort over the previously dominant Lancia. Nevertheless, the result was a disappointment for Ford since, although Delecour won the penultimate round of the season, in Catalunya, he lost the world title to Kankkunen.

Delecour and Ford were tipped as serious contenders for the 1994 World Championship, especially after Delecour's victory on the Monte Carlo Rally. However, Delecour retired from the second round of the championship in Portugal, with engine failure, and a few weeks later was injured in a road accident which forced him to miss the next four rounds. Biasion finished third in Portugal, but he was unable to keep up with the Toyotas, and his results did not improve thereafter, amid reports that his relationship with the team was deteriorating. He left at the end of 1994, and did not drive again at World Championship level.

In Delecour's absence the second Escort was driven by a succession of temporary drivers, including 1981 World Champion Ari Vatanen, young Belgian driver Bruno Thiry and Franco Cunico. With the exception of Vatanen's third place in Argentina (followed by retirement after a major crash in New Zealand while challenging for third), results were indifferent and the team faced some criticism for its dependence upon Delecour. The final guest driver proved a greater success, however: on a one-off drive for the team, Tommi Mäkinen won the 1994 1000 Lakes Rally. Delecour returned to the team on the same event but was still not fully fit and finished fourth, before retiring on the final two rounds. Thiry rounded off a disappointing season for the team by taking third place on the final round, in Great Britain.

Budgetary concerns due to supporting both Formula 1 and the BTCC meant the Ford works team at Boreham closed at the end of 1994, and the rally programme was handed over to the Belgian RAS Sport team. Biasion was replaced by Bruno Thiry, while Delecour stayed with the team. The season was shortened to eight events and servicing was much more restricted than in previous seasons. Group A cars also had to run with a smaller turbo restrictor than previously, which was a particular handicap for Ford, since the rally Escort's seven-speed gearbox was not well suited to a lower-revving engine. Delecour, although complaining volubly in interviews about the rule changes, finished second on the Monte Carlo. Bruno Thiry then led the Corsica Rally and looked likely to win, until a wheel bearing failure, which under previous rules his mechanics would have been able to rectify, put him out of the rally. Delecour finished second, but there were no further top-three placings that season and Ford finished at the bottom of the manufacturers' championship.

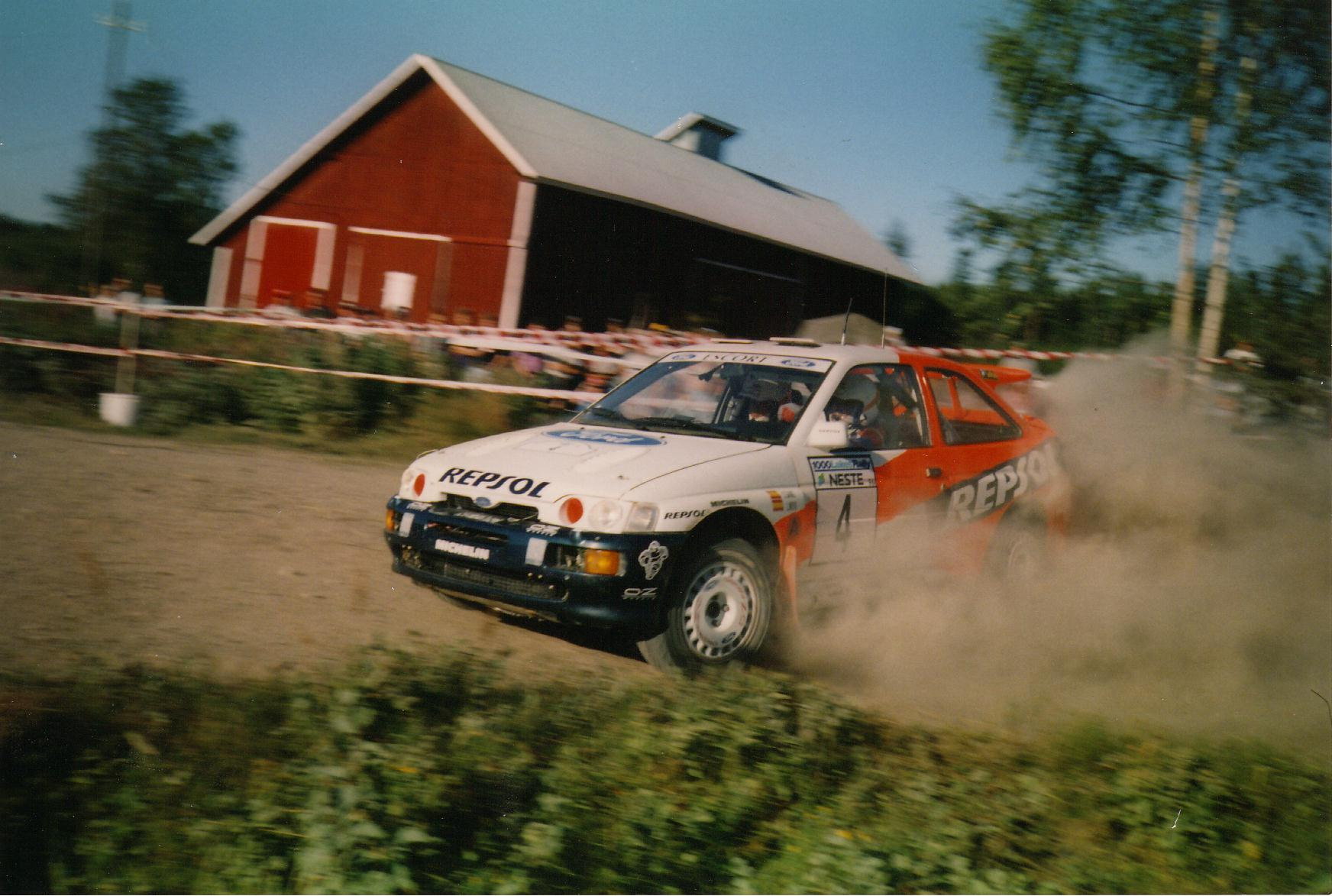
Carlos Sainz driving the Ford Escort RS Cosworth in the 1996 Rally Finland

The experiment with RAS not having been successful, Ford took its rally team back in-house for the 1996 season. Thiry stayed as second driver, but Delecour left the team and was replaced by Carlos Sainz. Sainz took third place in the driver's championship, with a win in Indonesia and second in Sweden and Italy. Nevertheless, the Escort was by this time outclassed by the Mitsubishi and Tommi Mäkinen, who won that year's title, and towards the end of the season interest switched towards the following season and the incoming World Rally Car rules.

Although it required some special dispensation, Ford were permitted to adapt the car into a World Rally Car for the 1997 season, to serve as a stopgap until a purpose-built WRC was developed. The semi-trailing-arm rear suspension, judged one of the Cosworth's weak points, was replaced with MacPherson struts, and modifications were made to the bodywork and transmission. Ford handed over the running of the team to Malcolm Wilson's team, now known as M-Sport.

During the 1997 and 1998 seasons, it went on to score two more victories by Carlos Sainz. With Thiry, Ari Vatanen (on a one-off podium-scoring basis at the Safari Rally after Thiry suffered an injury) and four-time World Rally Champion Juha Kankkunen now behind the wheel of the cars, the Escort name finally bowed out of works rallying altogether after a double-podium at the season-ending 1998 Rally of Great Britain.

Outside the World Championship, the Escort RS Cosworth was highly successful at National and European championship level, winning many national rally titles. These titles include:

- Belgian (1993, 1994, 1996)
- British (1994)
- Italian (1994, 1995, 1996)
- German (1993, 1994)
- French (1993 - 1995)
- Netherlands (1993, 1994)
- Austrian (1994, 1995)
- Greek (1994)
- Bulgarian (1995, 1996)
- Turkey (1994, 1995, 1996)
- Swiss (1995)
- Denmark (1995)
- Finland (1995)
- Irish (1995)
- Portuguese (1994, 1995, 1996)
- Czech Republic (1996)
- Lithuanian (1997)
- Slovenian (1996, 1997, 1998, 2002)

In 1993 Pierre-César Baroni and 1994 Belgian driver Patrick Snijers won the European Rally Championship with the Escort Rs Cosworth. It was also a successful Group N contender.

==== WRC victories ====
No.	Event	Season	Driver	Co-driver	Car
1	Rallye de Portugal	1993	(France) François Delecour	(France) Daniel Grataloup	Ford Escort RS Cosworth
2	(France) Tour de Corse	1993	(France) François Delecour	(France) Daniel Grataloup	Ford Escort RS Cosworth
3	(Greece) Acropolis Rally	1993	(Italy) Miki Biasion	(Italy) Tiziano Siviero	Ford Escort RS Cosworth
4	(Italy) Rallye Sanremo	1993	(Italy) Franco Cunico	(Italy) Stefano Evangelisti	Ford Escort RS Cosworth
5	(Spain) Rally Catalunya	1993	(France) François Delecour	(France) Daniel Grataloup	Ford Escort RS Cosworth
6	(Monaco) Monte Carlo Rally	1994	(France) François Delecour	(France) Daniel Grataloup	Ford Escort RS Cosworth
7	(Finland) 1000 Lakes Rally	1994	(Finland) Tommi Mäkinen	(Finland) Seppo Harjanne	Ford Escort RS Cosworth
8	Rally Indonesia	1996	(Spain) Carlos Sainz	(Spain) Luis Moya	Ford Escort RS Cosworth
9	(Greece) Acropolis Rally	1997	(Spain) Carlos Sainz	(Spain) Luis Moya	Ford Escort WRC
10	Rally Indonesia	1997	(Spain) Carlos Sainz	(Spain) Luis Moya	Ford Escort WRC

==== Overall winner in the W2L Series ====
No.	Event	Season	Driver	Co-driver	Car
1	(Monaco) Monte Carlo Rally	1996	(France) Patrick Bernardini	(France) Bernard Occelli	Ford Escort RS Cosworth

=== Formula One Safety Car ===
The Escort also had a foray in Formula One, albeit as its Safety Car. It was, in fact, used during two Grands Prix in the 1992 season to trial this new safety concept, which was officially introduced in the sport the following year (using other road cars).

=== Circuit Racing ===
Beyond rallies, the Escort RS Cosworth saw action on circuits, with specialised versions competing in events like the Belcar Historic Cup in Belgium and winning classes at the Nürburgring.

=== Rallycross ===
The Ford Escort RS Cosworth also carved out a brutal and successful niche in rallycross. In rallycross trim, the Escort RS Cosworth was often tuned far beyond its factory road-going specs. While the standard road car produced about 224 bhp, rallycross versions were frequently tuned to 600+ bhp and could achieve 0–60 mph in roughly 2.5 to 3 seconds in full rallycross specification. The car was used by numerous drivers to win national rallycross titles, including championships in France and Portugal. Drivers like former F1 driver Patrick Tambay and rallycross specialist Michael Jernberg competed in high-output Escort Cosworths during the late 90s.
