= Scorpius (disambiguation) =

Scorpius (♏) is a constellation of the zodiac, named after the ancient Greek word for scorpion.

Scorpius may also refer to:

== Arts and entertainment ==
- Scorpius (novel), a James Bond novel by John Gardner
- "Scorpius" (Doctor Who audio), an audio drama episode of the Cyberman audio series based on Doctor Who
- Scorpius (Farscape), a fictional alien in the TV series Farscape
- Scorpius, a fictional villain in the Power Rangers Lost Galaxy TV series
- Scorpius, a fictional robot in the pinball video game Sonic Spinball
- "Scorpius", a song by band Midnight Juggernauts
- Scorpius Malfoy, a fictional character from J.K. Rowling’s “Harry Potter” series

== Other uses ==
- Euscorpius, a genus of scorpions also known as Scorpius
- Scorpius (electronic warfare system), a defensive electronic warfare system.

== See also ==
- Scorpio (astrology) (♏)
