= Grinnall Specialist Cars =

UK automobile manufacturer

Grinnall Cars
- Type: Limited Company
- Industry: Automotive
- Founded: 1991; 35 years ago in Bewdley, United Kingdom
- Founder: Mark Grinnall
- Headquarters: Stourport-on-Severn, United Kingdom
- Area served: Worldwide
- Key people: Mark Grinnall
- Website: www.grinnalltrikes.co.uk

The Grinnall Specialist Cars Ltd. (Grinnall Cars) is an automobile and motorcycles maker founded by Mark Grinnall in United Kingdom, primarily creating trikes.

== History ==
Grinnall Cars was founded by Mark Grinnall, originally responsible for modifying the Triumph TR7 and later creating a 350 unit run of the Grinnall TR8 based on Triumph TR8. In 1991, Grinnall formally moved into manufacturing three wheeled cars and motorcycles - known as Trikes. The first model, launched in 1992, was the Scorpion III an open two seat, three wheeled sports car, using BMW K1100 motorcycle engines that could reach over 130 mph. One famous owner and supporter of the Scorpion III was Roger Cook, of The Cook Report.

By 1999, Grinnall had switched focus to manufacturing motorcycle trikes, initially modifying BMW R1200C which launched in 2000. More recently, Grinnall modify the BMW R1200CL, Montauk, the R1150R, and since 2005 launching a Triumph based Rocket 3. Grinnall also own the Birmingham dealership for Indian Motorcycles, of which the company manufacture trike models.

In 2015, Grinnall moved to a new facility in Stourport-On-Severn.

== Products ==
=== Models ===
Model	Classification	Description
TR7	Car	Modified TR7s produced in the late 1980s
TR8	Car	350 produced and recognised as the Grinnall TR8 by Triumph
Scorpion III	Trike car	
Scorpion IV	Trike car	
BMW R1200C	Trike motorcycle	Designed by Steve Harper responsible for the Scorpion III
Rocket 3	Trike motorcycle	Based on the Triumph Rocket 3
Midwest Indian 3	Trike motorcycle	

== See also ==
- List of car manufacturers of the United Kingdom
- List of motorized trikes
