= Sea scorpion =

Sea scorpion may refer to:

- Eurypterids, extinct arthropods in the order Eurypterida
- Some fish in the family Cottidae, such as:
  - Long-spined sea scorpion (Taurulus bubalis)
  - Short-spined sea scorpion (Myoxocephalus scorpius)

== See also ==
- Nepidae, an insect, commonly known as a water scorpion
