= Bakrie =

Bakrie may refer to the following family of Indonesian businesspeople and related organizations:

- Aburizal Bakrie (born 1946), son of Achmad, father of Anindya
- Achmad Bakrie, father of Aburizal
  - Bakrie Group, an Indonesian conglomerate founded by Achmad Bakrie in 1942
  - Bakrie Sumatera Plantations, an agricultural subsidiary of Bakrie Group
  - Bakrie Global Ventura, an Indonesian investment company
  - Bakrie Tower, a skyscraper in Jakarta, Indonesia
  - Bakrie University, a private university in Jakarta, Indonesia
- Adika Nuraga Bakrie (born 1981)
- Adinda Bakrie
- Anindya Bakrie (born 1974), son of Aburizal
