= Roewe 360 =

Roewe 360 Plus
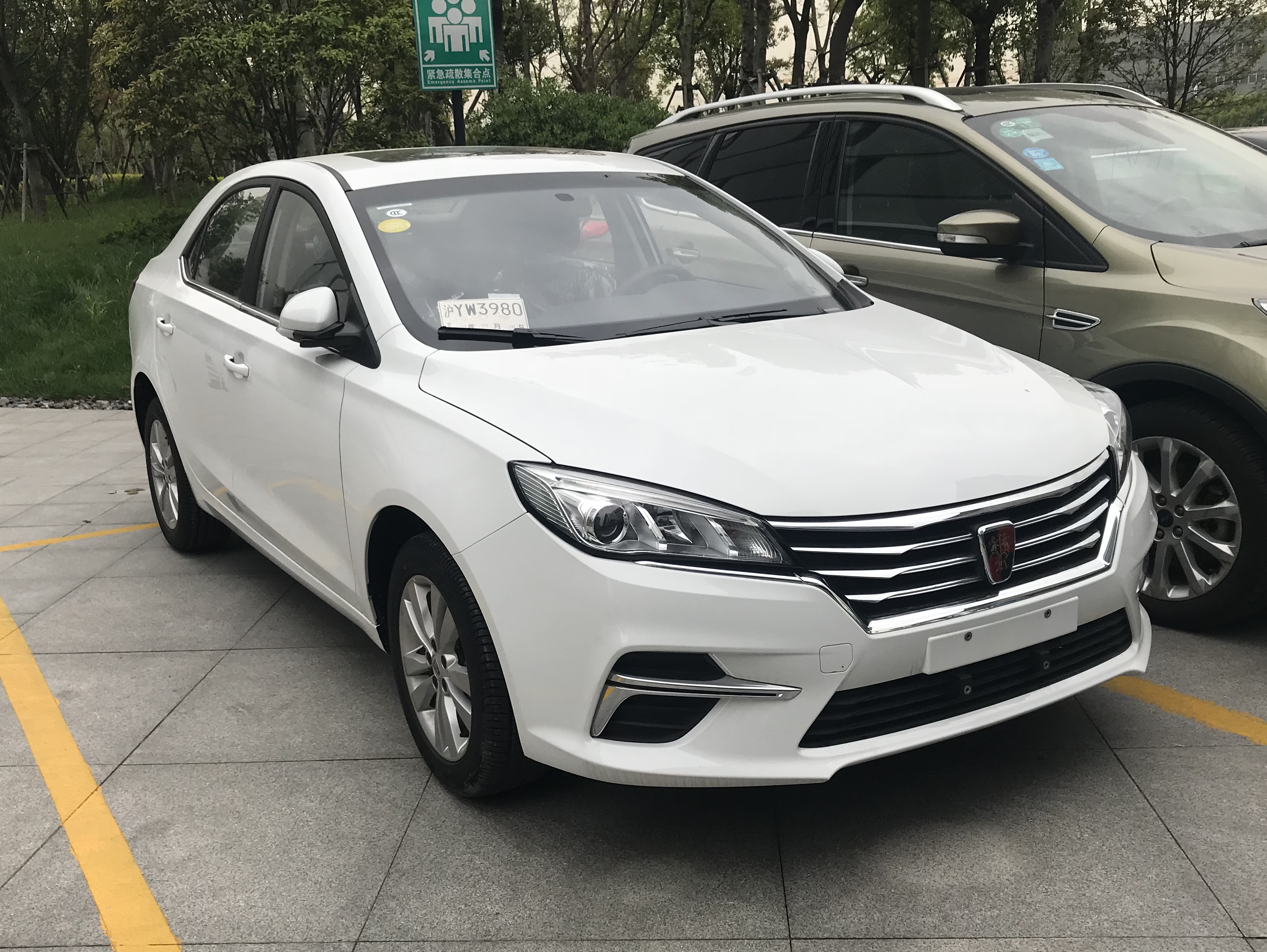

Overview
- Manufacturer: SAIC Motor
- Also called: Roewe 360 Plus; MG 360
- Production: 2015–2018
- Assembly: China: Nanjing, Pukou; Iran: Mamqan (Azvico)

Body and chassis
- Class: Small family car
- Body style: 4-door sedan
- Layout: FF layout
- Platform: GM-PATAC K platform
- Related: MG 5 MG GT

Powertrain
- Engine: 1.4 L 14E4E turbo I4 (NetBlue); 1.5 L 15S4C I4
- Transmission: 5-speed manual; 7-speed DCT; 4-speed automatic

Dimensions
- Wheelbase: 2,660 mm (105 in)
- Length: 4,579 mm (180 in)
- Width: 1,804 mm (71 in)
- Height: 1,490 mm (59 in)

Chronology
- Predecessor: Roewe 350
- Successor: Roewe i5 (for Roewe 360)

The Roewe 360 is a compact sedan produced by SAIC under Roewe sub-brand from 2015 to 2018.

== Overview ==
The Roewe 360 was introduced in 2015 as the successor of the Roewe 350 compact sedan. Since SAIC can use GM engines and transmissions under a deal agreed in 2014, the Roewe 360 shares the same engine and transmission as the Chevrolet Cruze, which is also sold by SAIC in China.

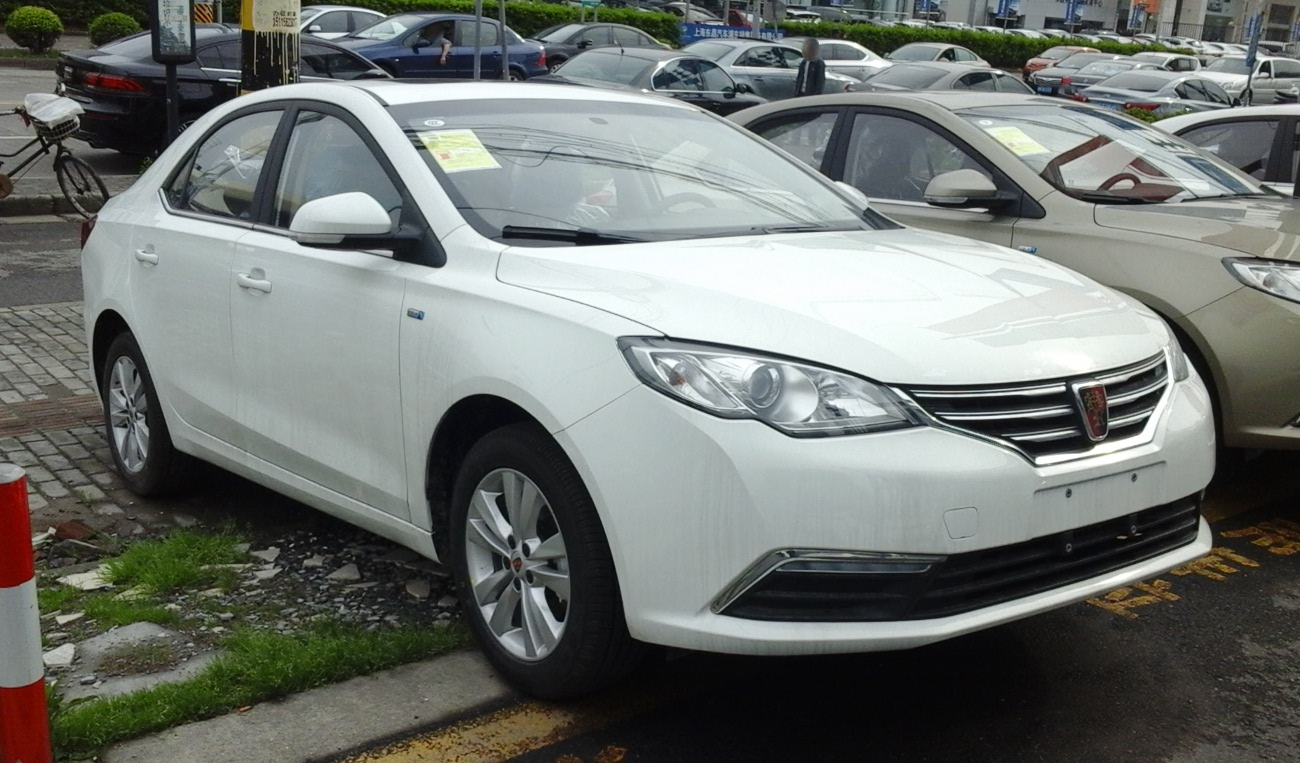
Roewe 360 (front).

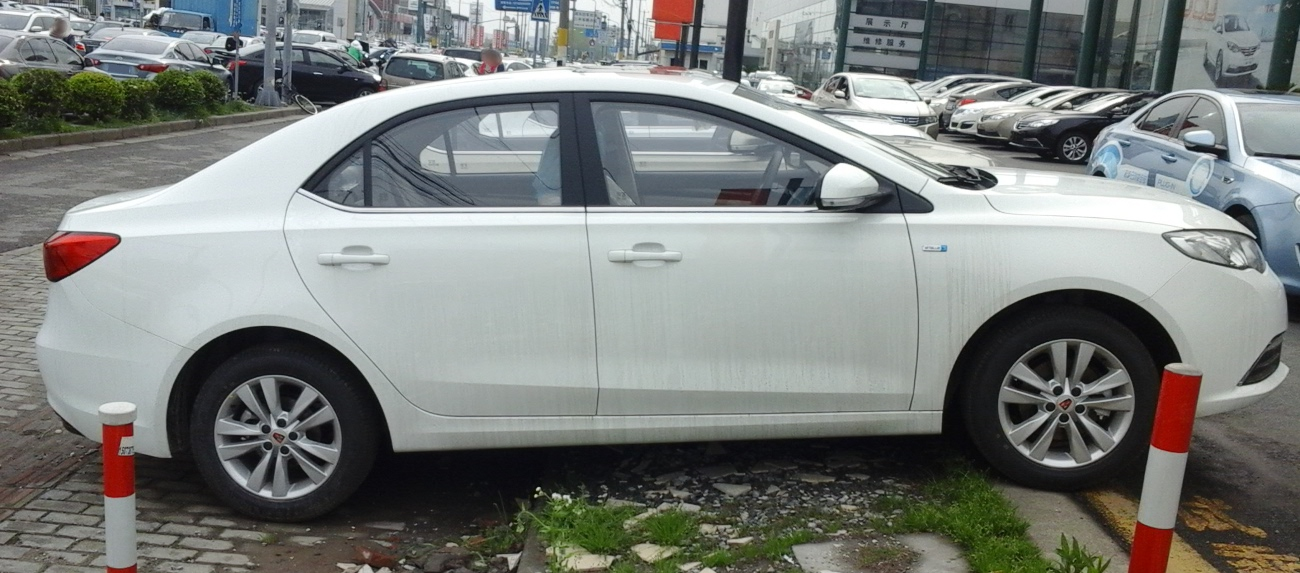
Roewe 360 (side).

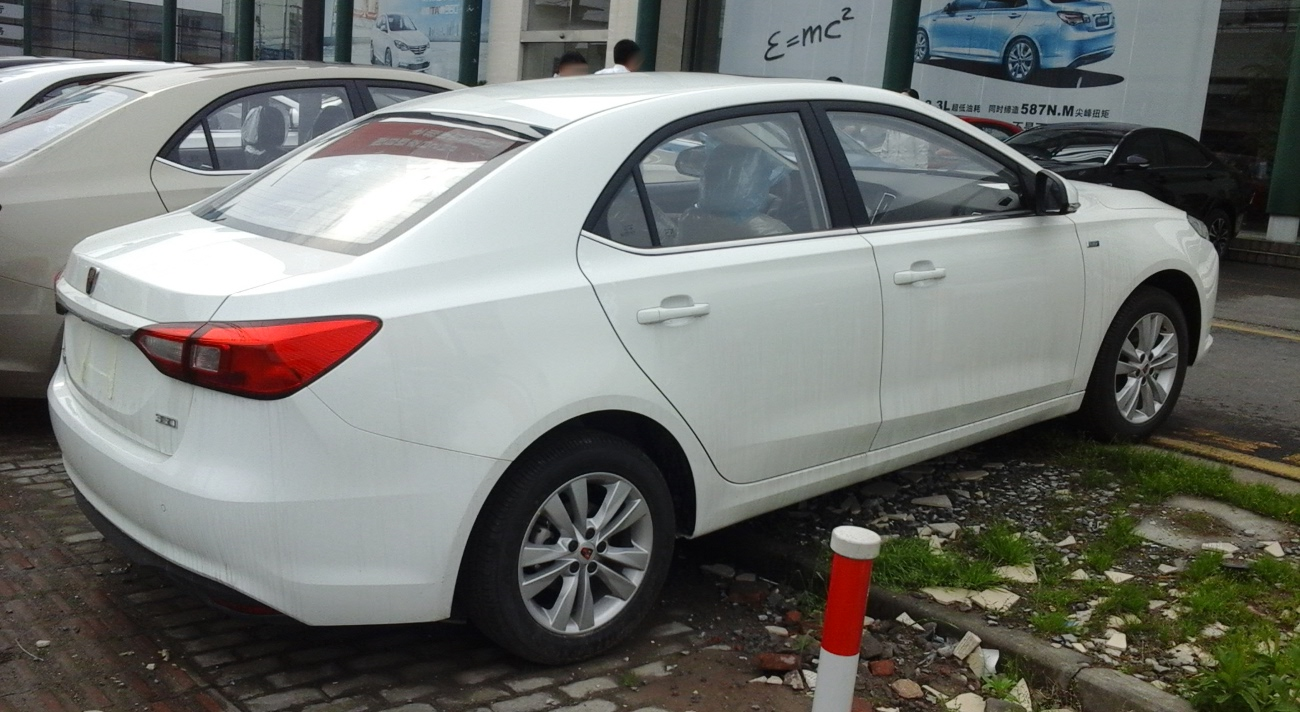
Roewe 360 (rear).

== Roewe 360 Plus ==
The Roewe 360 received a minor facelift in 2017. Its front bumpers, headlamps, and grilles were redesigned in line with the updated Roewe product line, creating a front fascia similar to those of the Roewe RX3, Roewe RX5, Roewe i6 and the facelifted Roewe 950.

According to the official website, the model was named the 360 Plus, and was priced slightly higher than the regular 360.

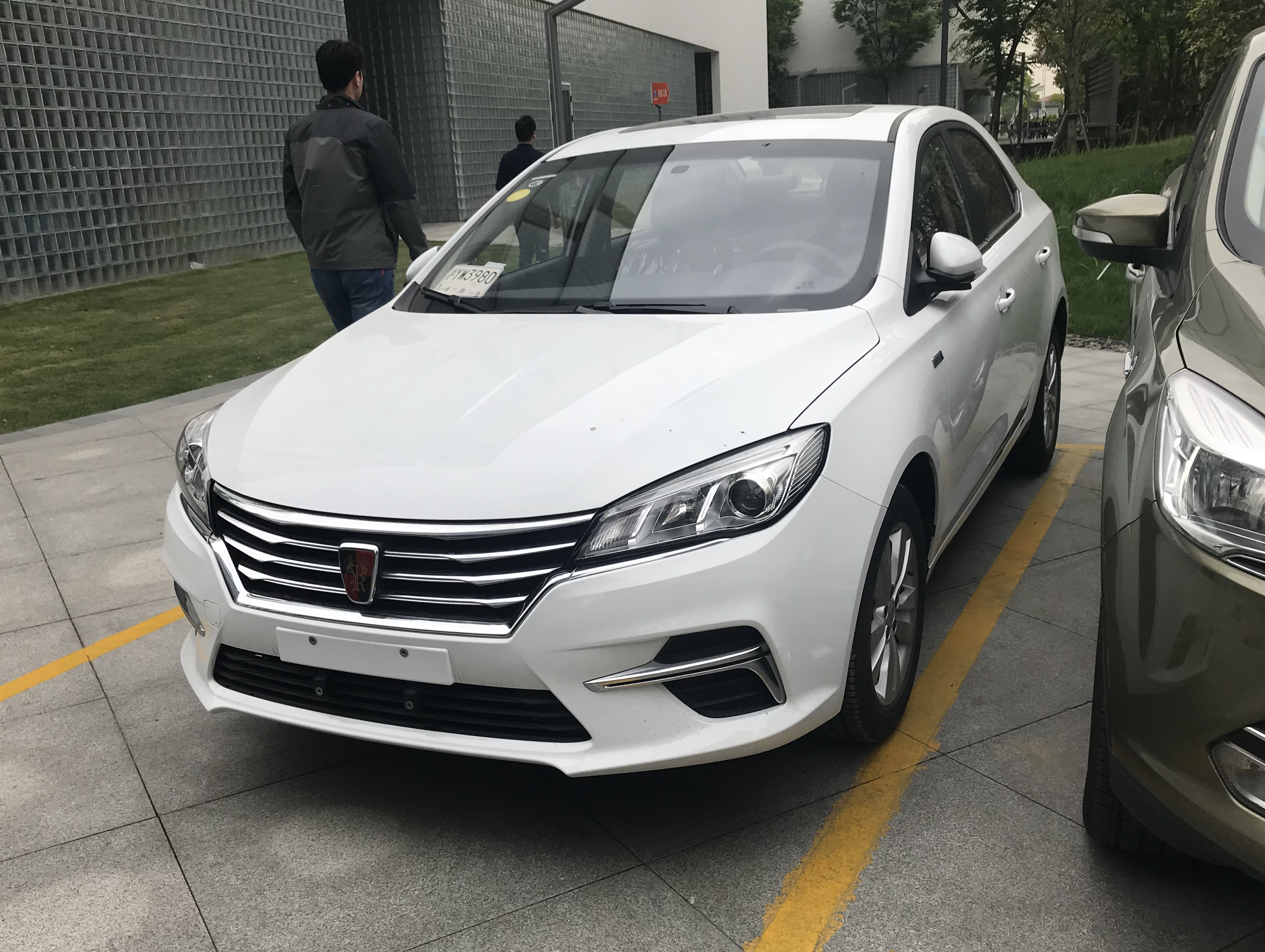
Roewe 360 Plus (front).

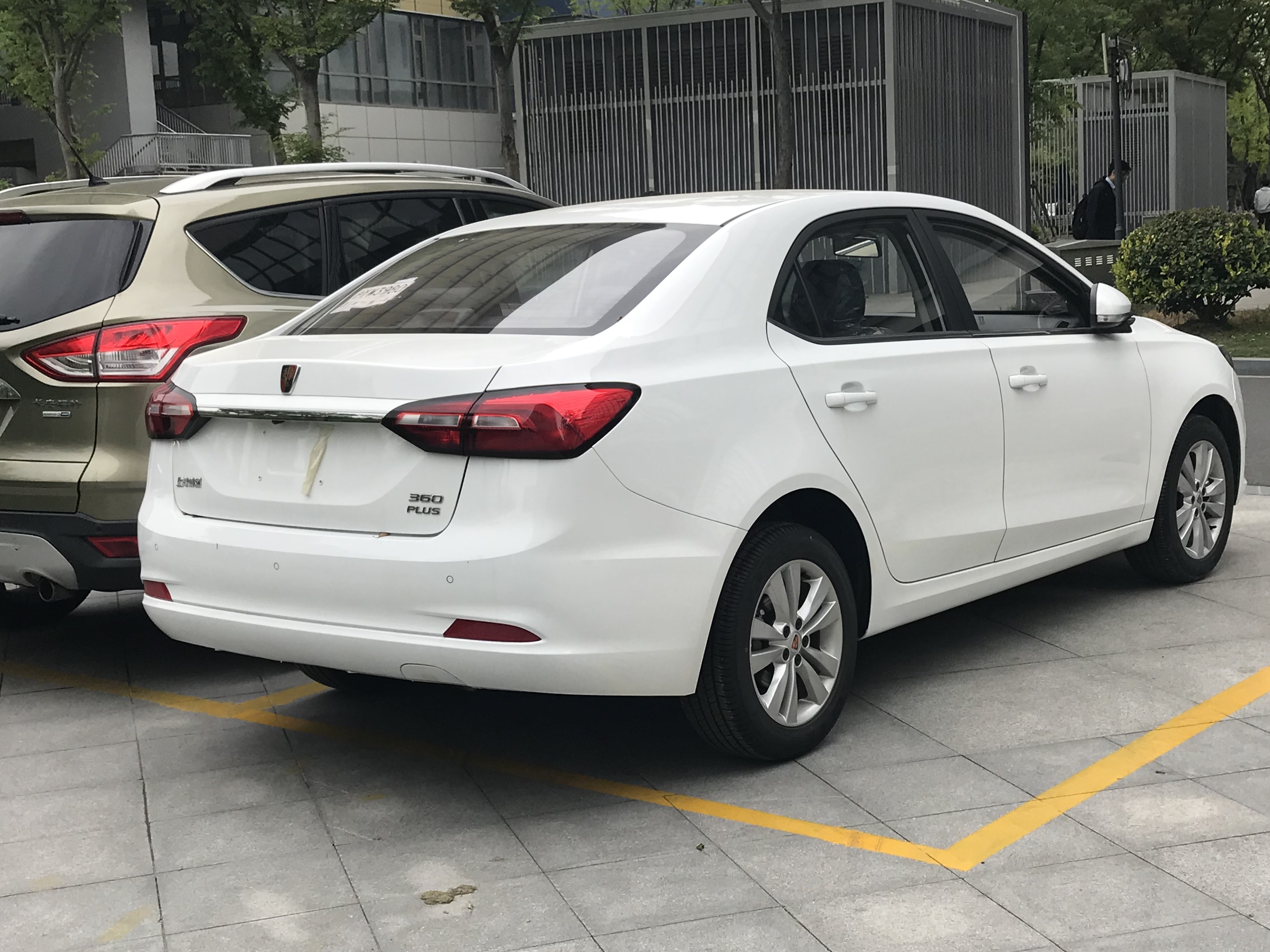
Roewe 360 Plus (rear).
