= Roewe i5 =

Subcompact car by SAIC Motor

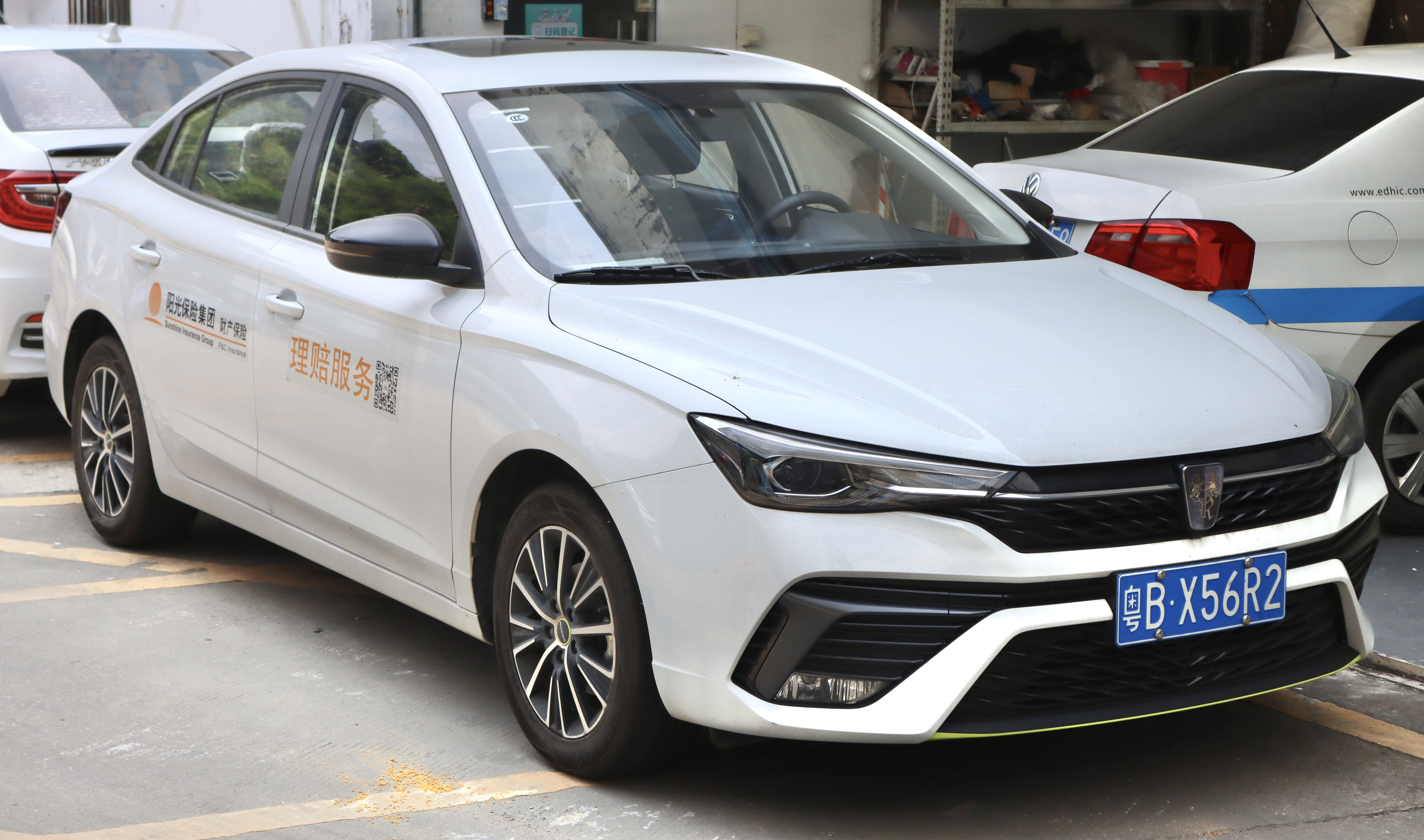
- 2021 Roewe i5 (first facelift)

Overview
- Manufacturer: SAIC Motor
- Model code: AP31
- Also called: MG5; Artaban Artan (Iran)
- Production: 2017–present
- Assembly: China: Zhengzhou (SAIC Motor Zhengzhou Plant)

Body and chassis
- Class: Subcompact car (B)
- Body style: 4-door saloon
- Layout: Front-engine, front-wheel drive
- Platform: PATAC K platform

Powertrain
- Engine: Petrol: 1.5 L 15S4C I4; 1.5 L 15E4E I4 turbo
- Transmission: 5-speed manual; CVT; 7-speed DCT

Dimensions
- Wheelbase: 2,680 mm (105.5 in)
- Length: 4,607 mm (181.4 in)
- Width: 1,818 mm (71.6 in)
- Height: 1,489 mm (58.6 in)

Chronology
- Predecessor: Roewe 360; MG 5 (first generation)

The Roewe i5 is a subcompact car produced by SAIC Motor since 2017. Available as a saloon car and as an electric estate car; the latter was first introduced as the Roewe Ei5 at the 2017 Guangzhou Auto Show.

For export markets, the model is marketed under the British MG Motor marque. The saloon car is sold as the MG5 while the battery electric estate variant is sold in Europe as the MG5 EV and in Thailand as the MG EP or MG ES.

== Overview ==
The Roewe i5 (MG5 in export markets) is a petrol-powered model and is only available as a saloon, while the battery-electric Ei5 is only available as an estate. The engines for the i5 are the same 1.5-litre (92 cu in) inline-4 petrol engine and 1.5-litre inline-4 turbocharged petrol engine from the Buick Excelle GX.

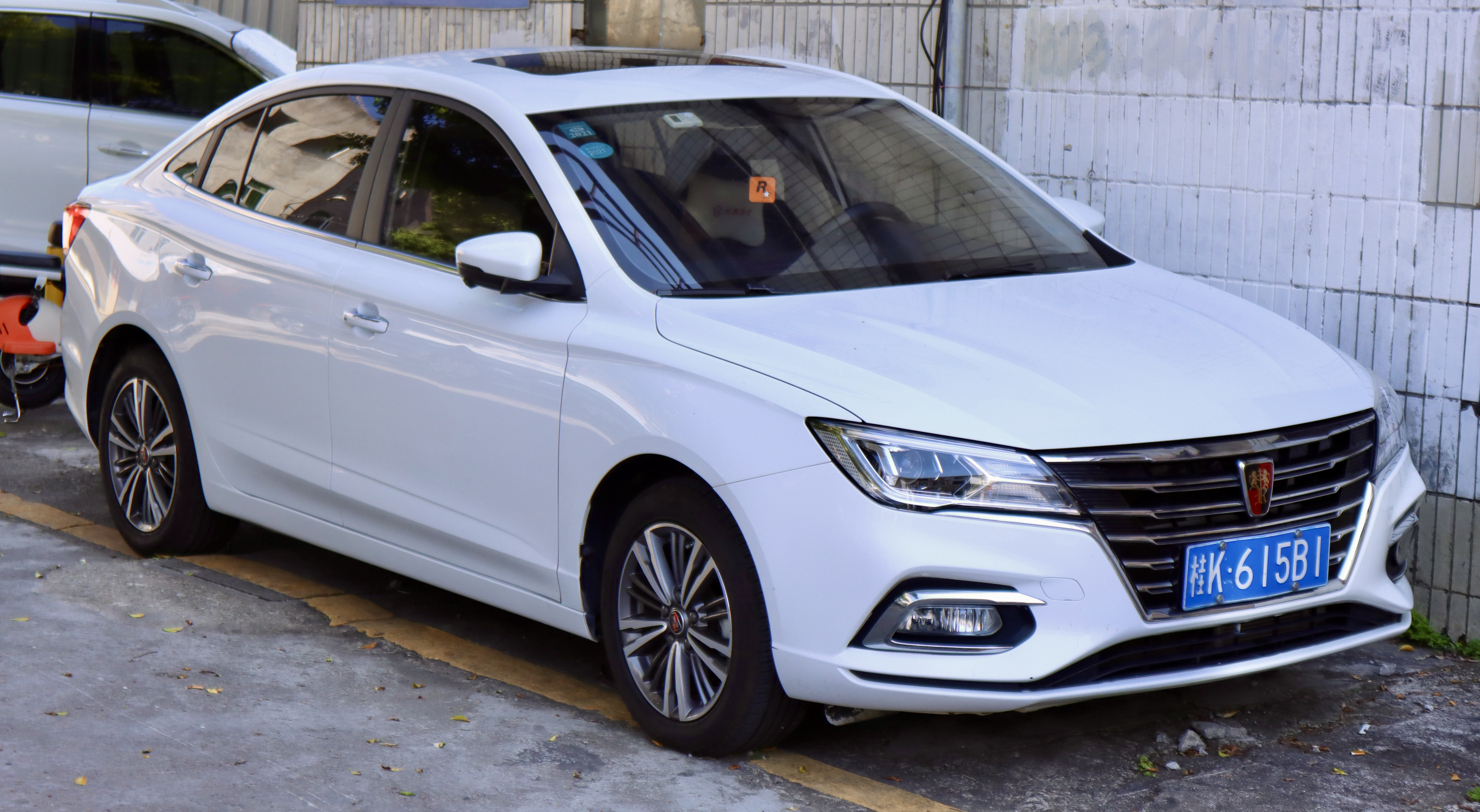
2017 Roewe i5 (pre-facelift)

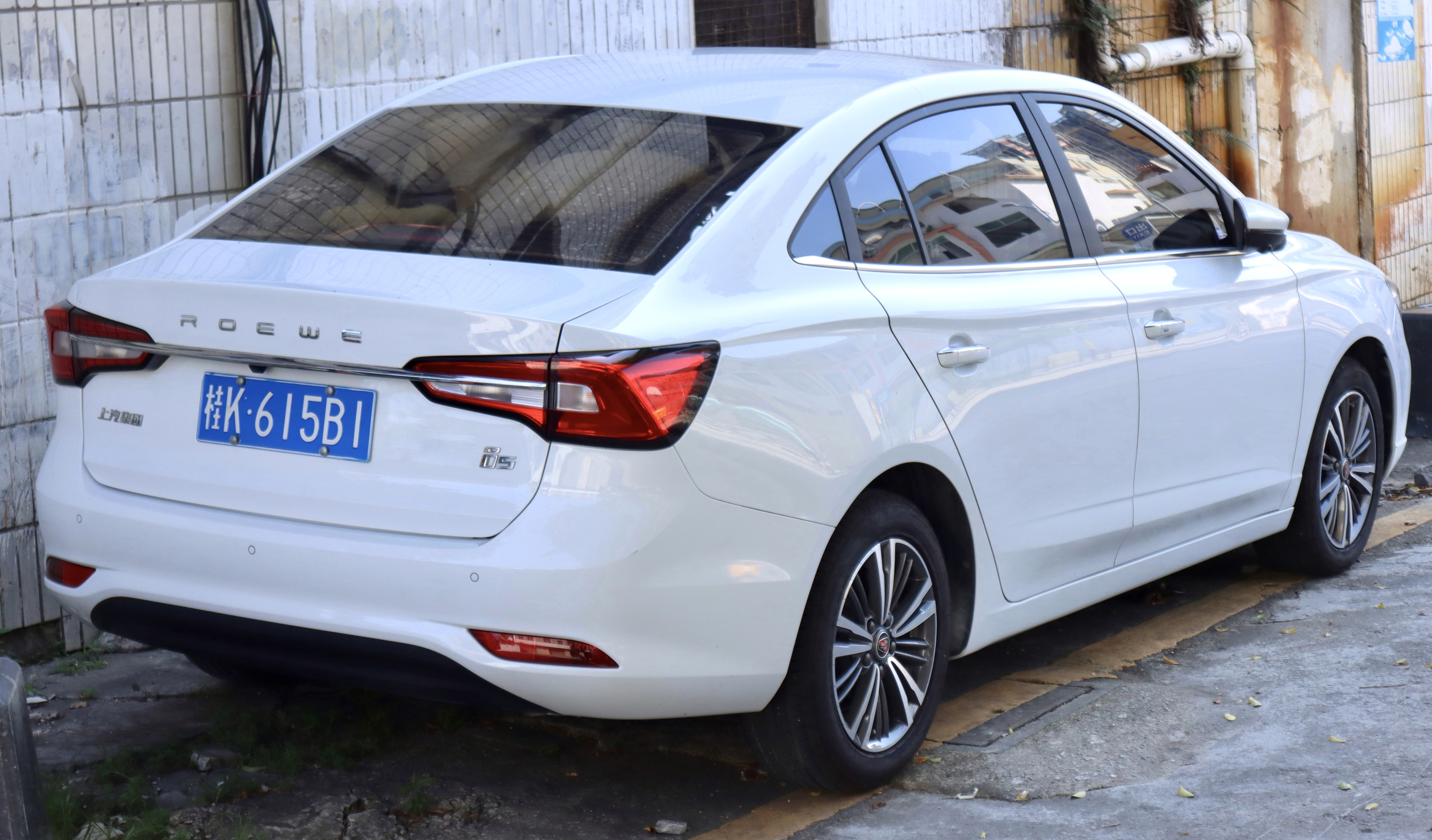
Rear view (pre-facelift)

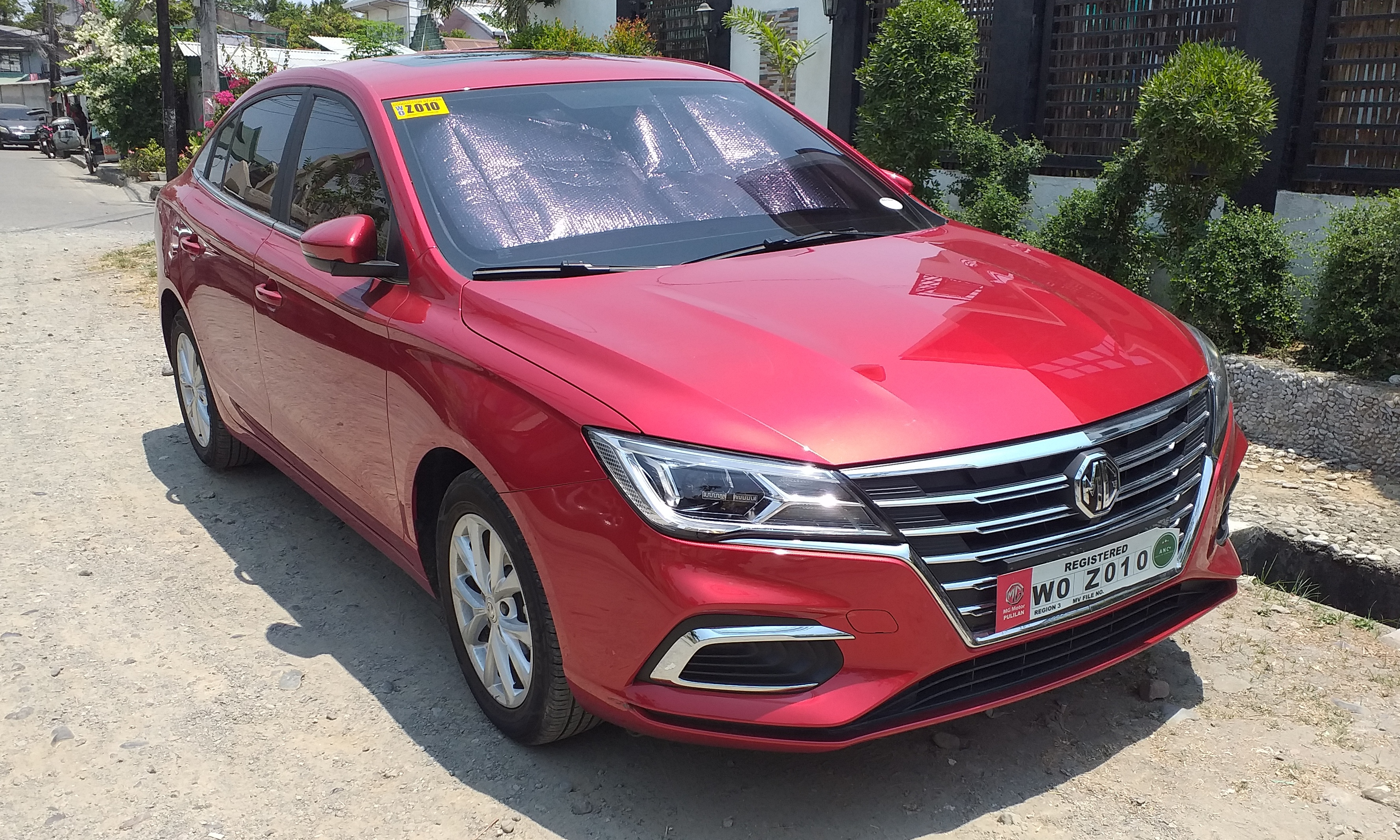
MG5 saloon (pre-facelift)

=== 2021 facelift ===
The i5 received a facelift for the 2021 model year as China adopted the Youth, Dynamic and Quality design philosophy featuring redesigned front and rear end designs, redesigned side profile, new alloys and interior trims. The updated model is powered by a selection of SAIC's Bluecore 1.5-litre turbo engine and 1.5-litre engine, with the 1.5-litre turbo engine developing 169 hp (126 kW; 171 PS) and 250 N⋅m (184 lb⋅ft; 25 kg⋅m) and the 1.5-litre engine developing 120 hp (89 kW; 122 PS) and 150 N⋅m (111 lb⋅ft; 15 kg⋅m).

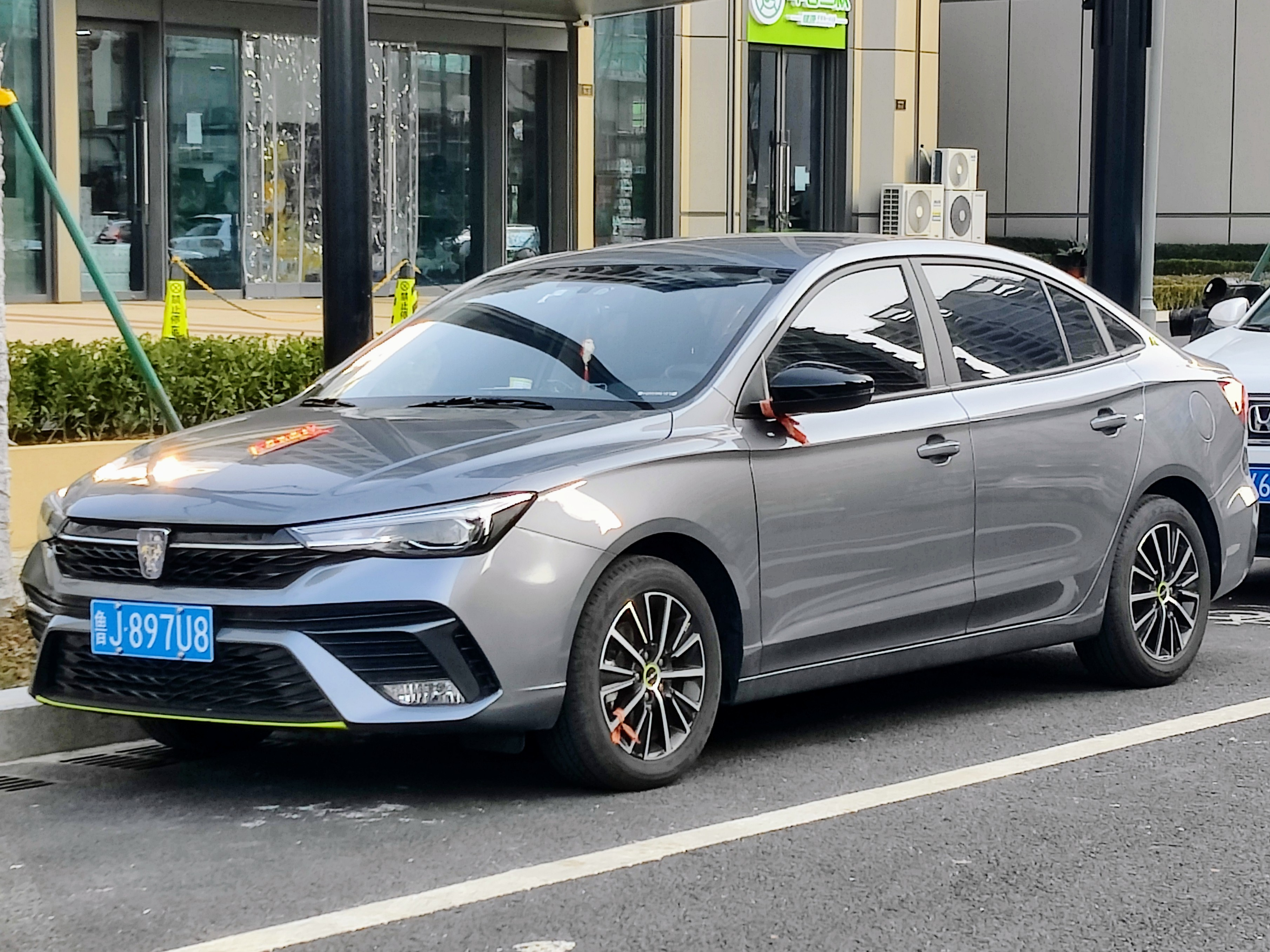
2023 Roewe i5 (first facelift)

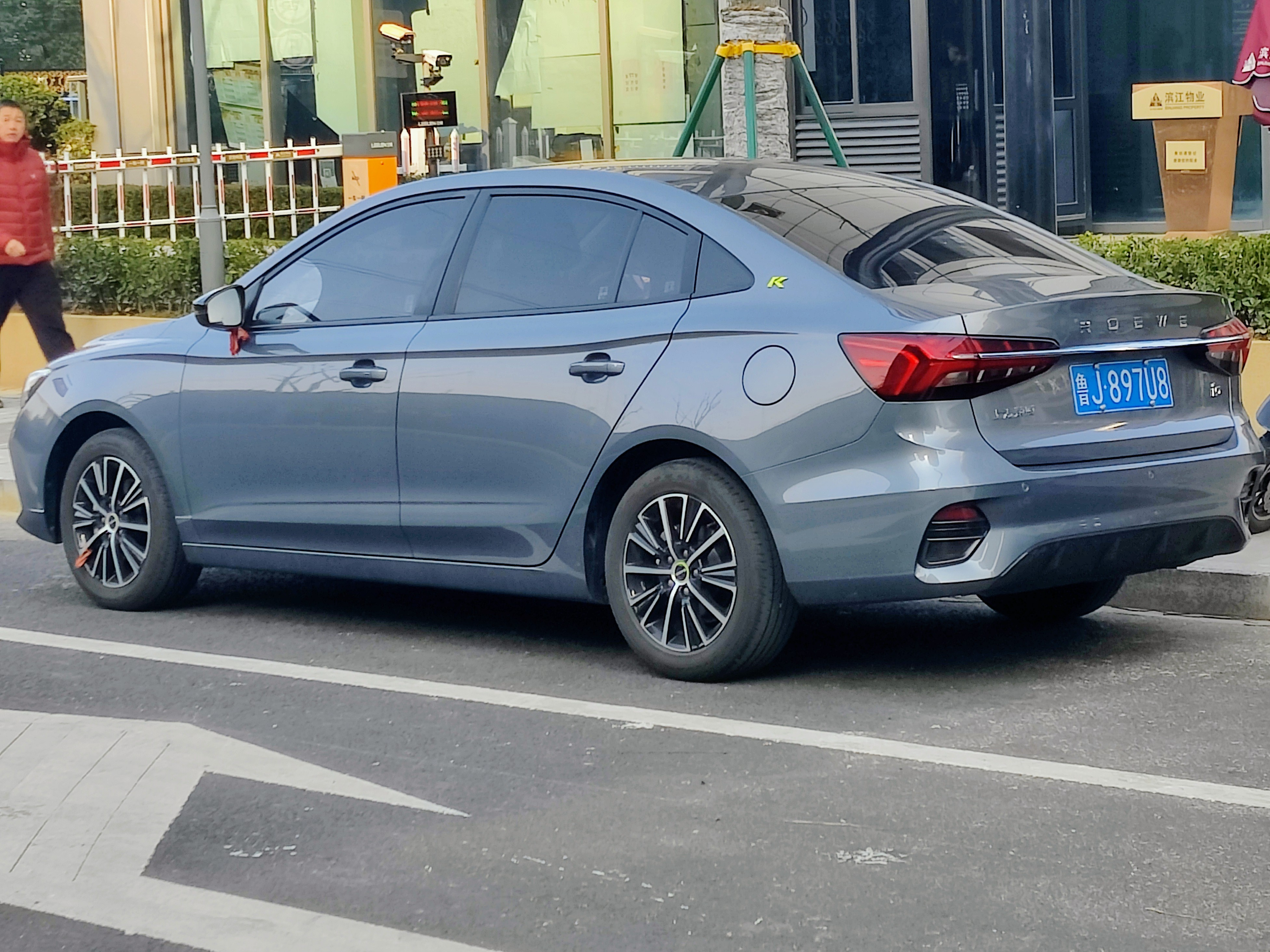
Rear view (first facelift)

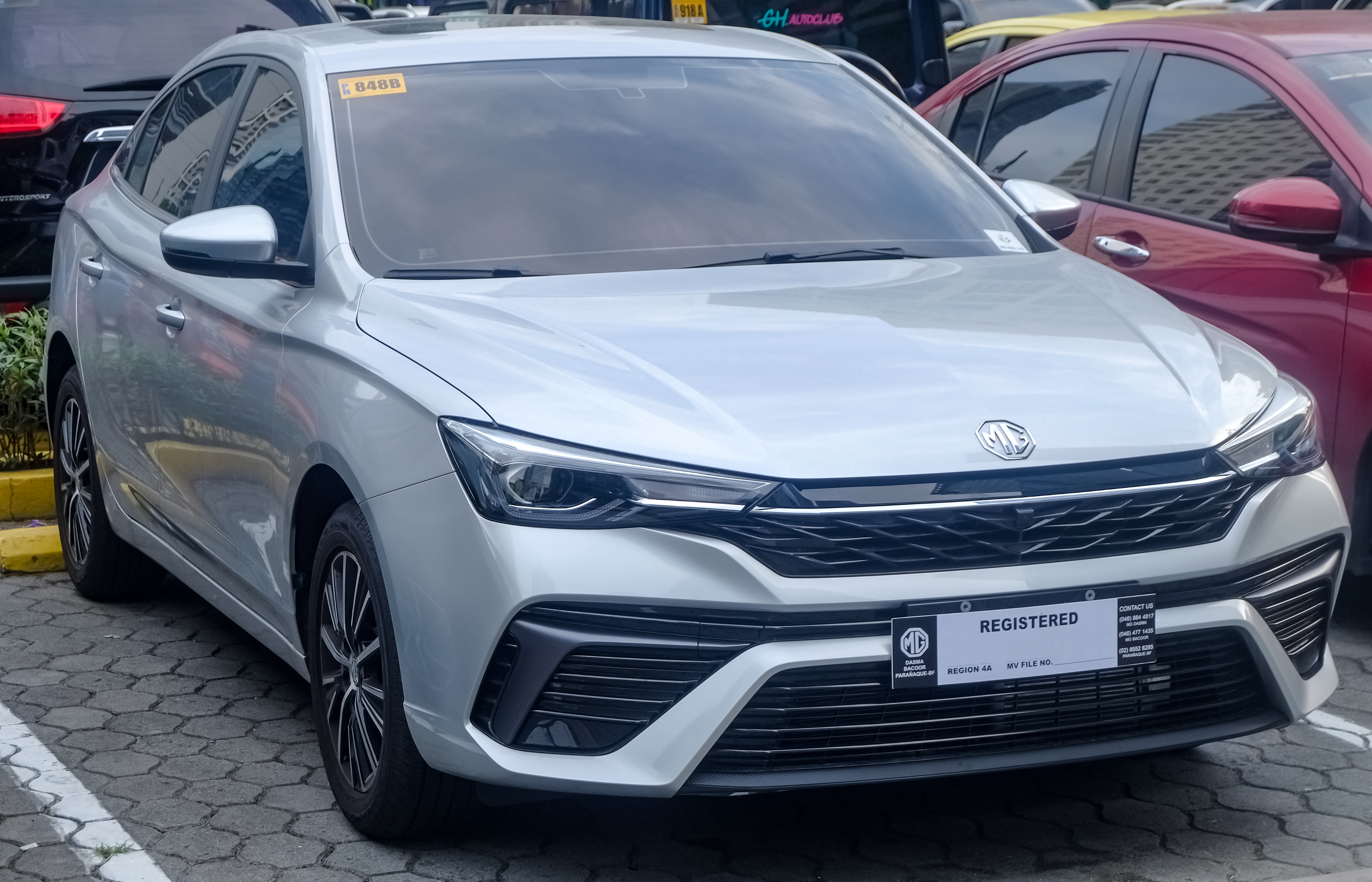
MG5 Prestige (facelift)

=== i5 GT ===
A sportier trim was unveiled during the 2021 Chengdu Auto Show called the Roewe i5 GT. The i5 GT features the same powertrain as the base i5 saloon and features redesigned front and rear bumpers with larger grilles.

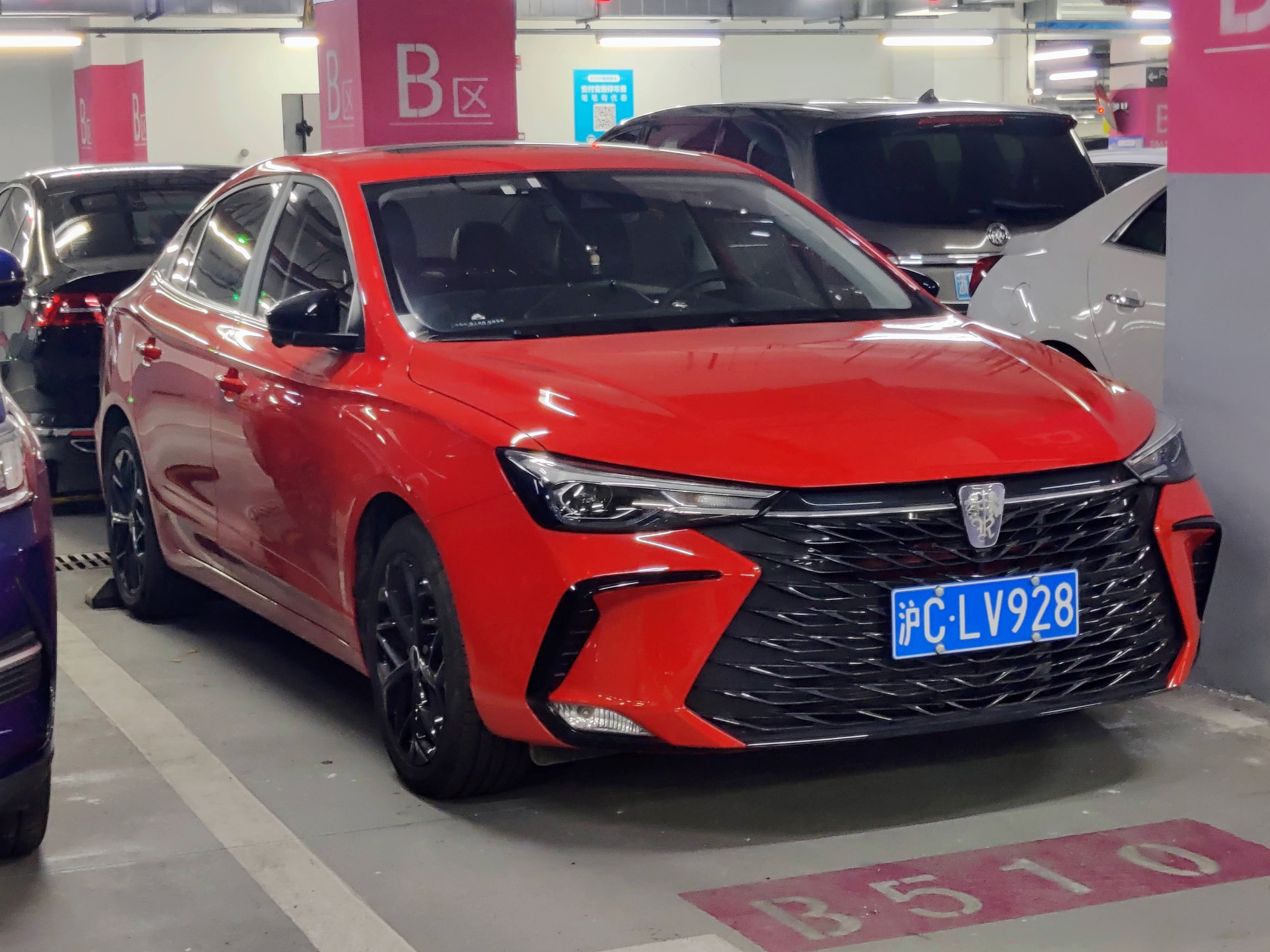
Roewe i5 GT front view

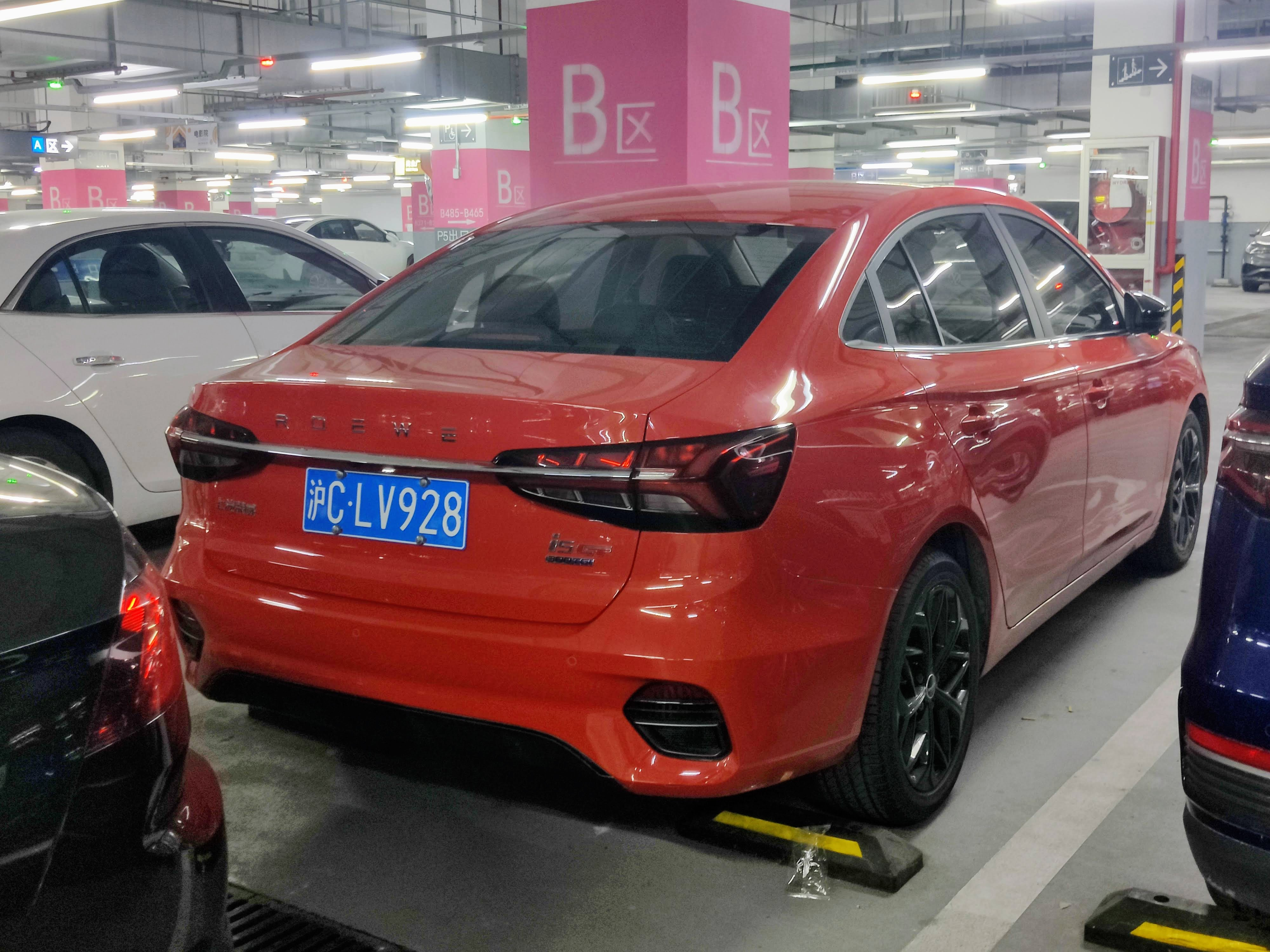
Roewe i5 GT rear view

=== 2023 facelift ===
The Roewe i5 received a second facelift, which was launched in June 2023. This is an extensive facelift which features new front and rear end designs, side fenders, and a new interior.

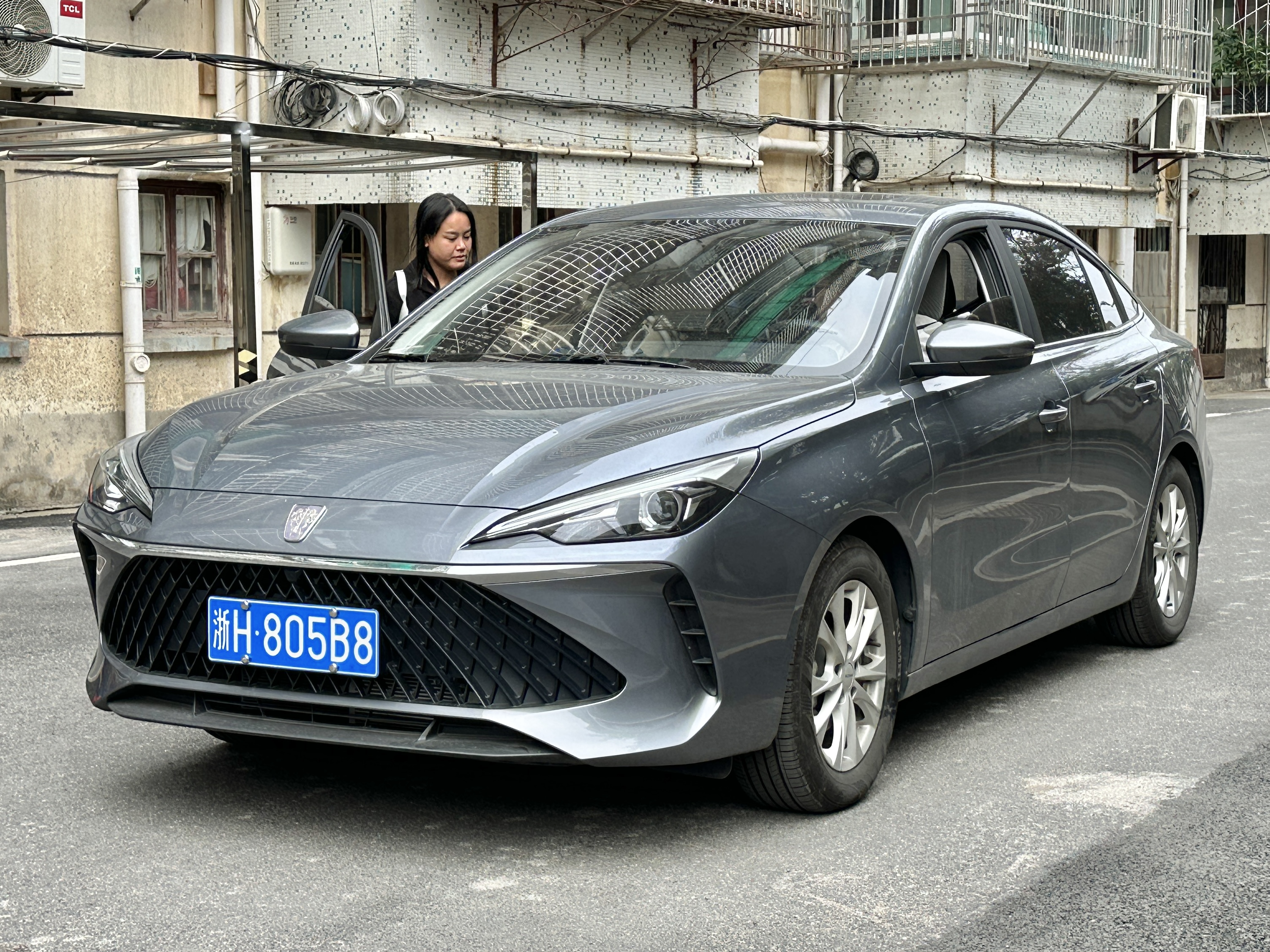
2023 Roewe i5 (second facelift)

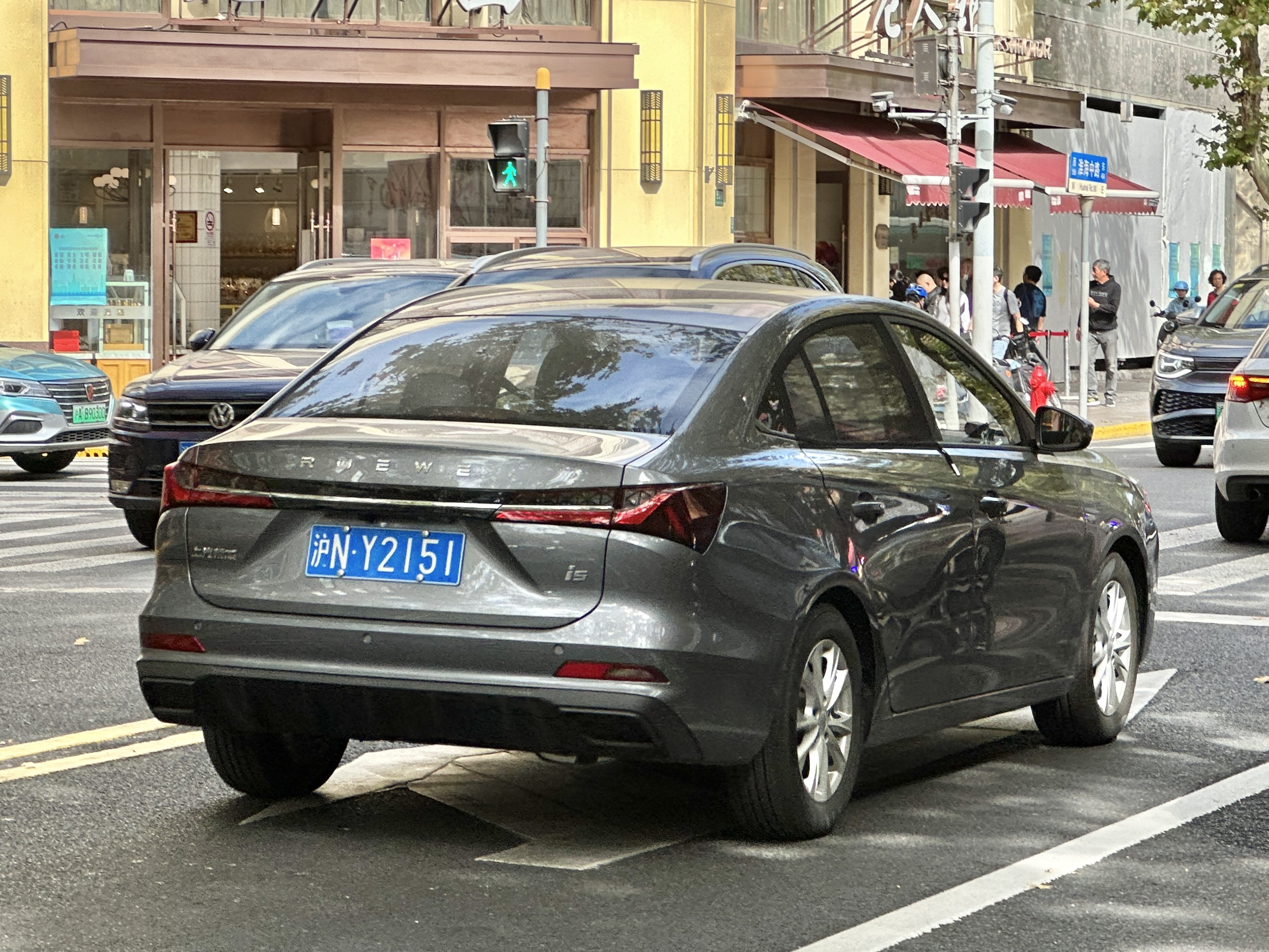
Rear view (second facelift)

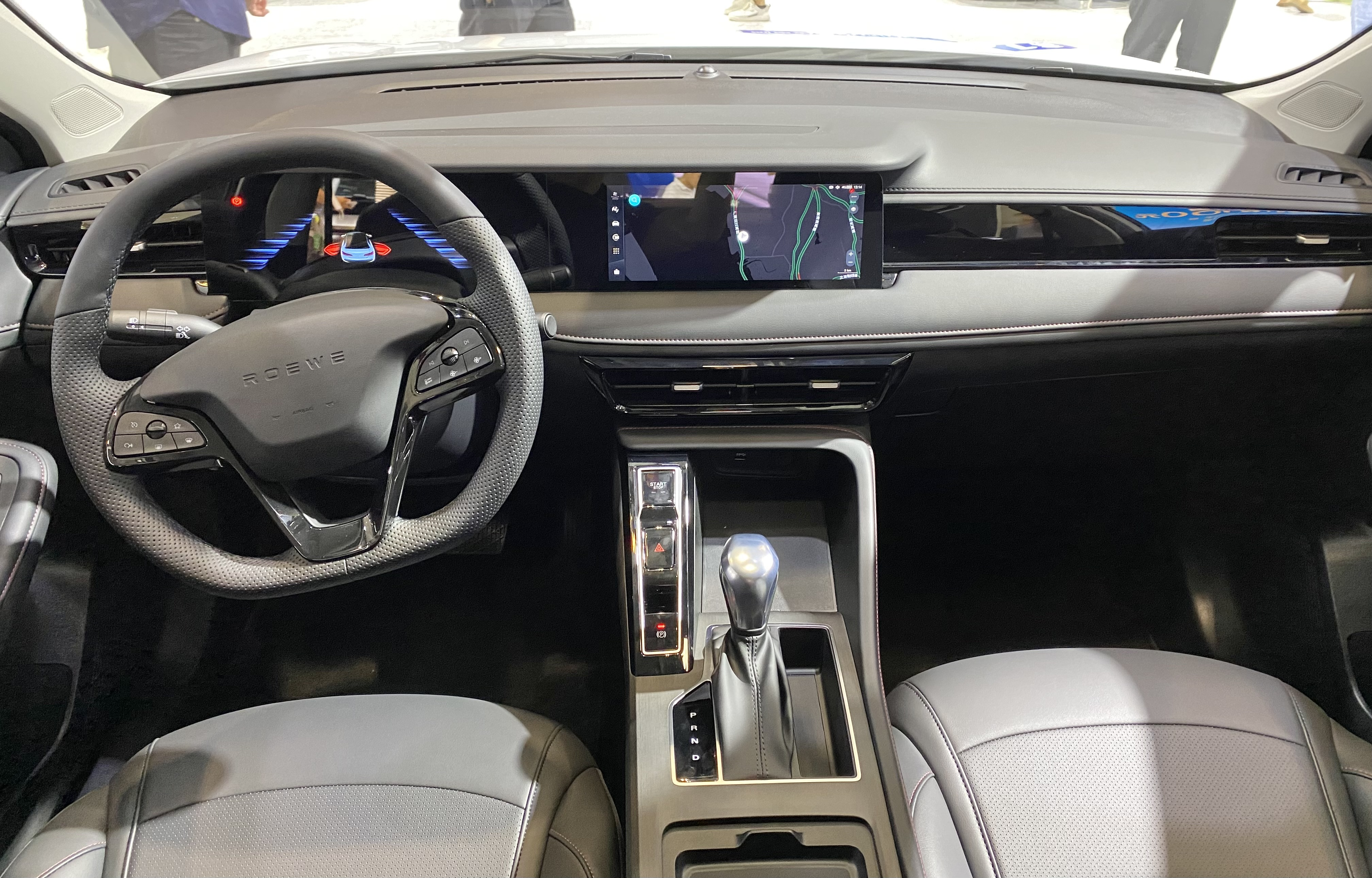
Interior (second facelift)

== Roewe Ei5 / MG5 EV (EP22) ==
Roewe Ei5
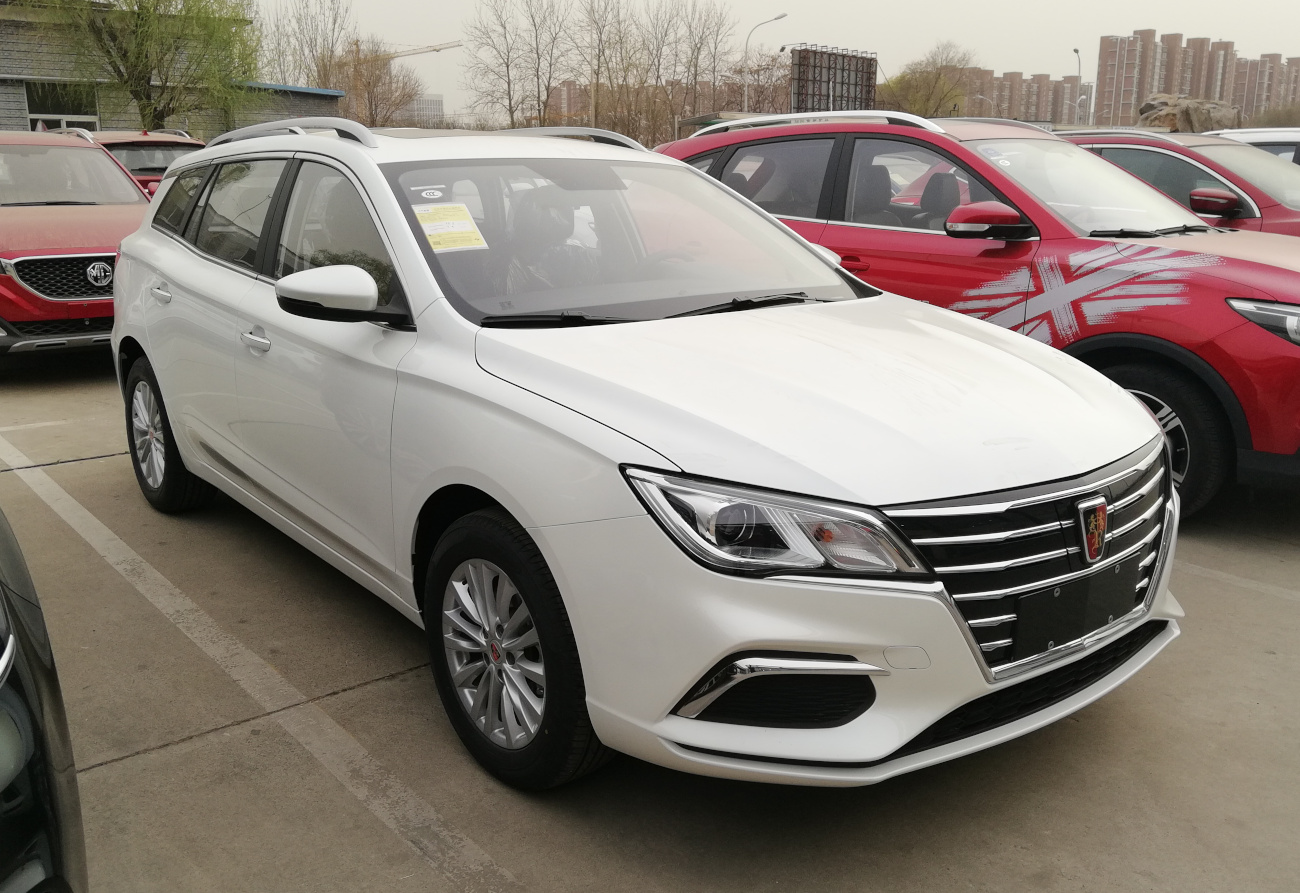

Overview
- Model code: EP22
- Also called: MG5 EV; MG EP (Thailand); MG ES (Thailand, 2023–present)
- Production: 2017–2025 (China); 2020–present (export)

Body and chassis
- Body style: 5-door estate

Powertrain
- Electric motor: Permanent magnet synchronous (EV)
- Transmission: 1-speed fixed gear

Dimensions
- Wheelbase: 2,665 mm (104.9 in)
- Length: 4,544 mm (178.9 in)
- Width: 1,818 mm (71.6 in)
- Height: 1,509 mm (59.4 in)

The Roewe Ei5 is the electric estate car version of the Roewe i5. Debuting during the 2017 Guangzhou Auto Show, the Chinese version is powered by a single electric motor producing 116 hp (87 kW; 118 PS). It claims a range of 300 km (190 mi) and a 145 km/h (90 mph) top speed.

The Ei5 was launched in the UK rebranded as the MG5 EV in September 2020, with a more powerful, 154 hp (115 kW; 156 PS) electric motor and a 115 mph (185 km/h) top speed. With a 52.2-kWh battery, the vehicle has a range of 344 km (214 mi) in the WLTP cycle. A long range version with 400 V, 61.1 kWh battery is available and has a range of 400 km (250 mi) in WLTP cycle. 87 kW DC, 11 kW AC charging. 2.2 kW V2L.

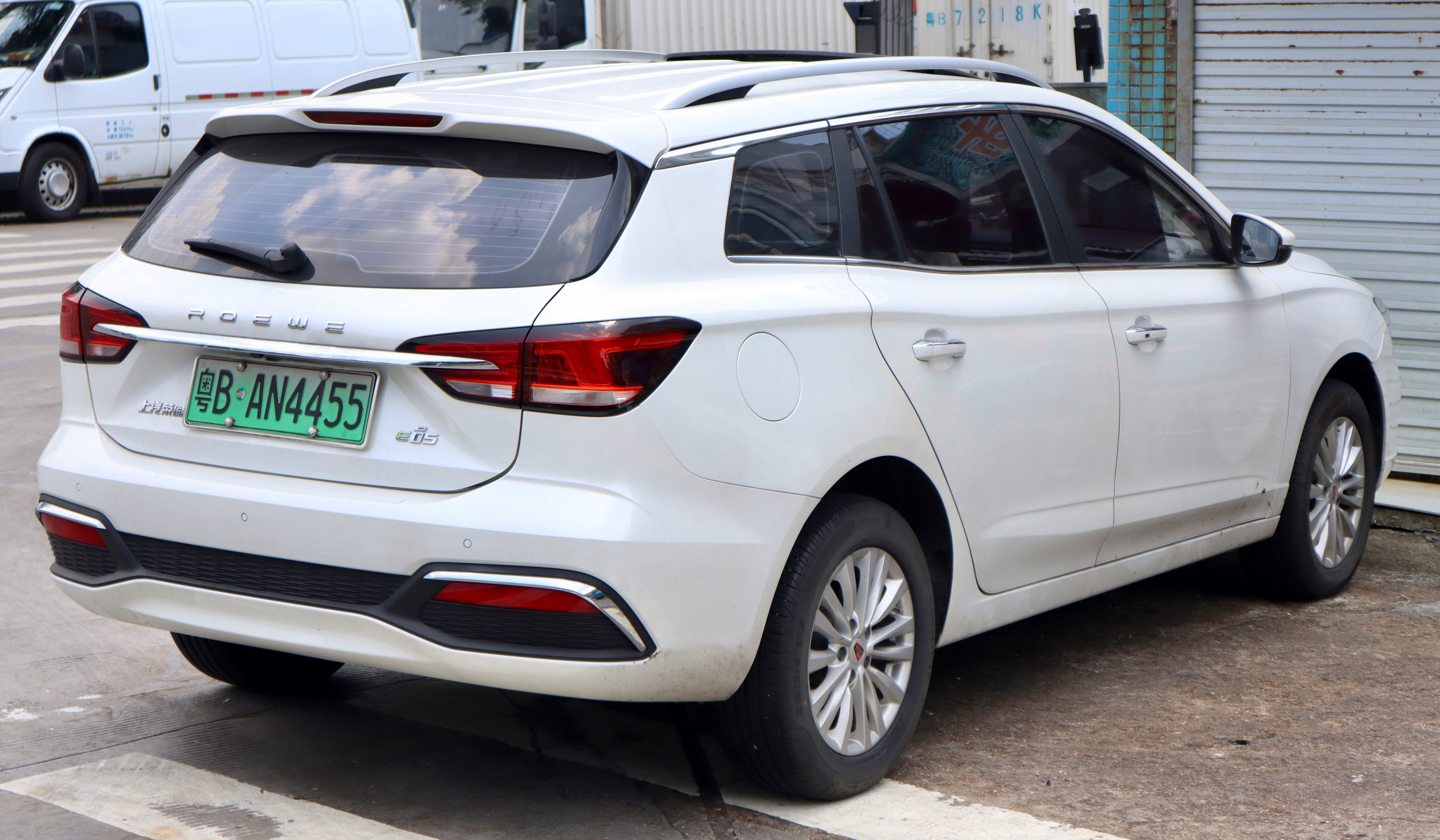
Rear view

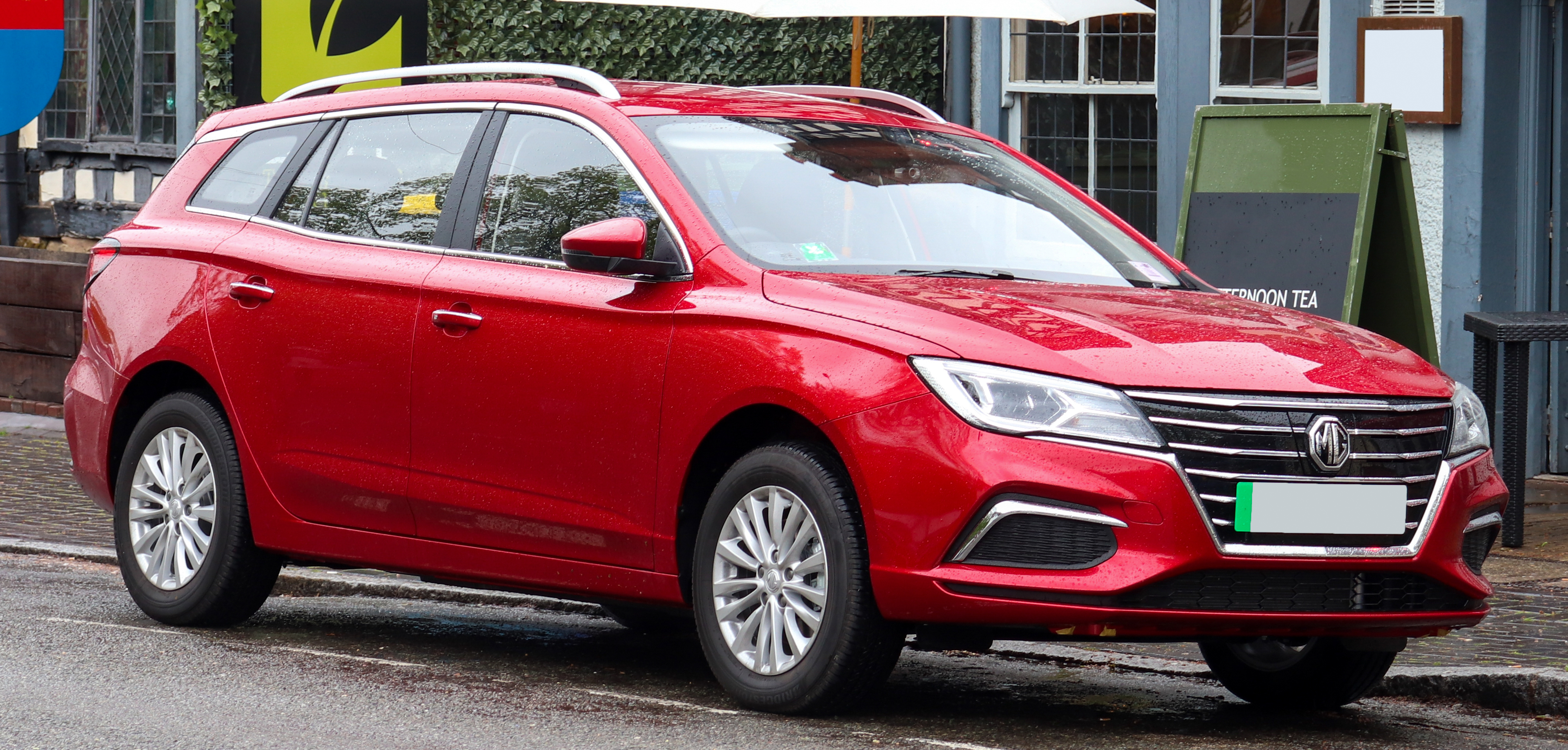
MG5 SW EV (UK)

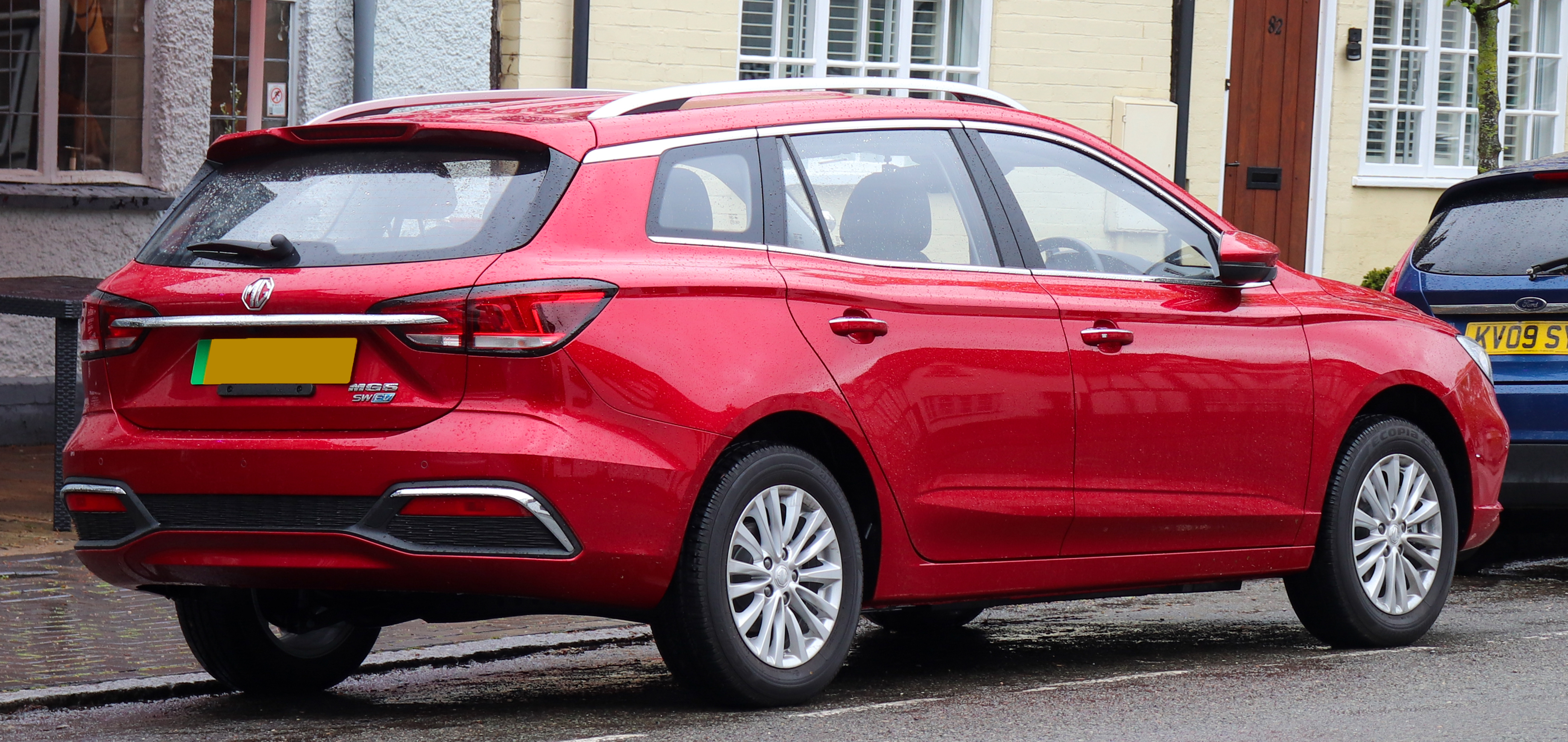
Rear view

=== 2021 facelift ===
The Ei5 received a facelift for the 2021 model year in China featuring redesigned front and rear end designs, the updated Roewe badge, new alloys, a new interior with new trim pieces and a new infotainment system. The updated model is powered by a 135 kW (181 hp; 184 PS) electric motor and has an NEDC range of 501 km (311 mi). The battery capacity is 61 kWh. Like the pre-facelift model, it is sold in Europe as the MG5. It is offered in two battery versions: Standard Range and Long Range. The Standard Range variant has a battery with a net capacity of 50.3 kWh (gross capacity 52.4 kWh). The Long Range battery has a net capacity of 57.7 kWh (gross capacity 61.1 kWh) with a maximum charging capacity of 87 kW with DC and 11 kW with AC from a domestic 230V socket. The stated ranges are 320 kilometres (200 mi) and 400 kilometres (250 mi), respectively. The performance of both versions is a top speed of 185 km/h and acceleration from 0 to 100 km/h in approximately 8.3 seconds.

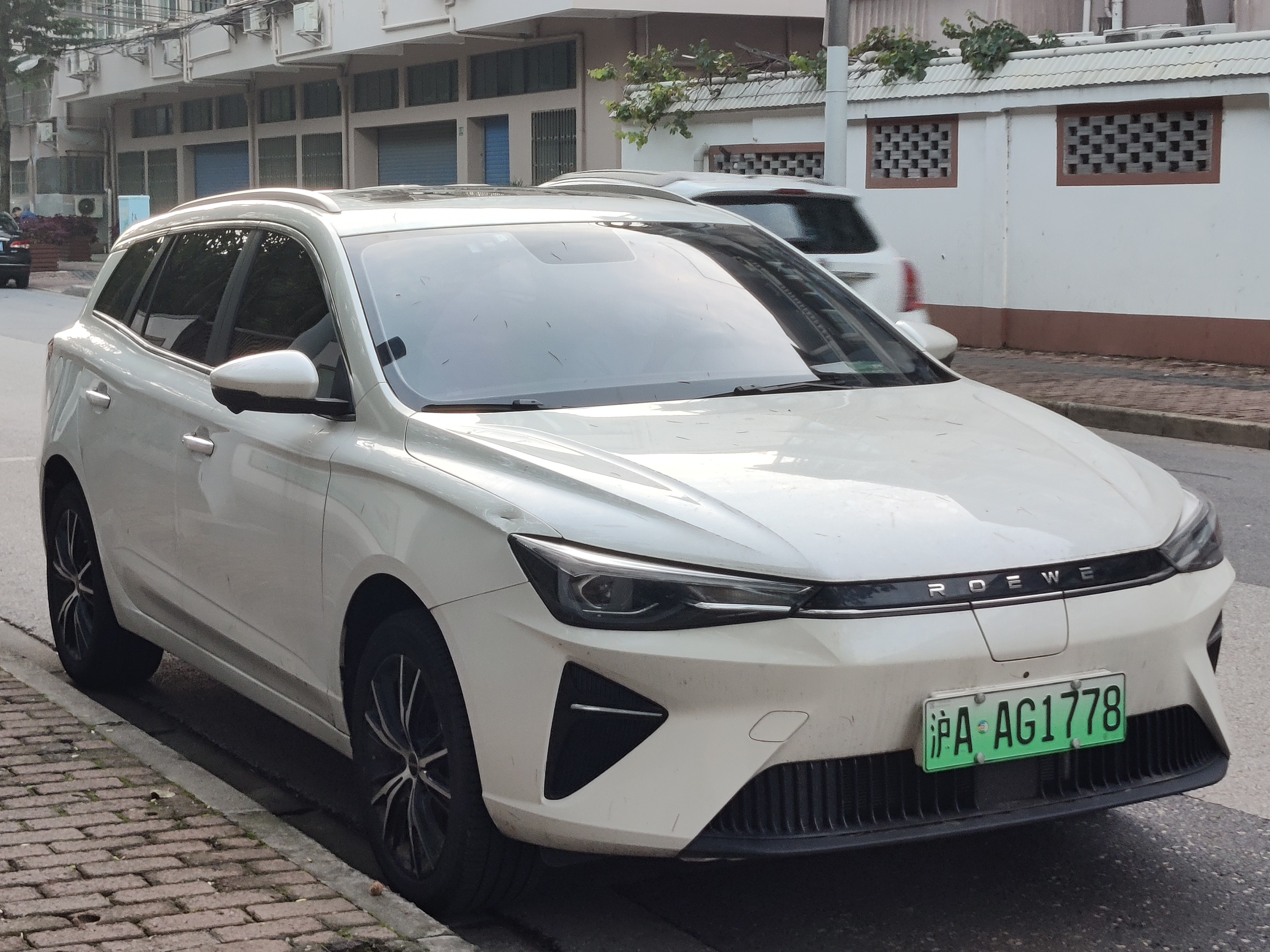
Roewe Ei5 (facelift)

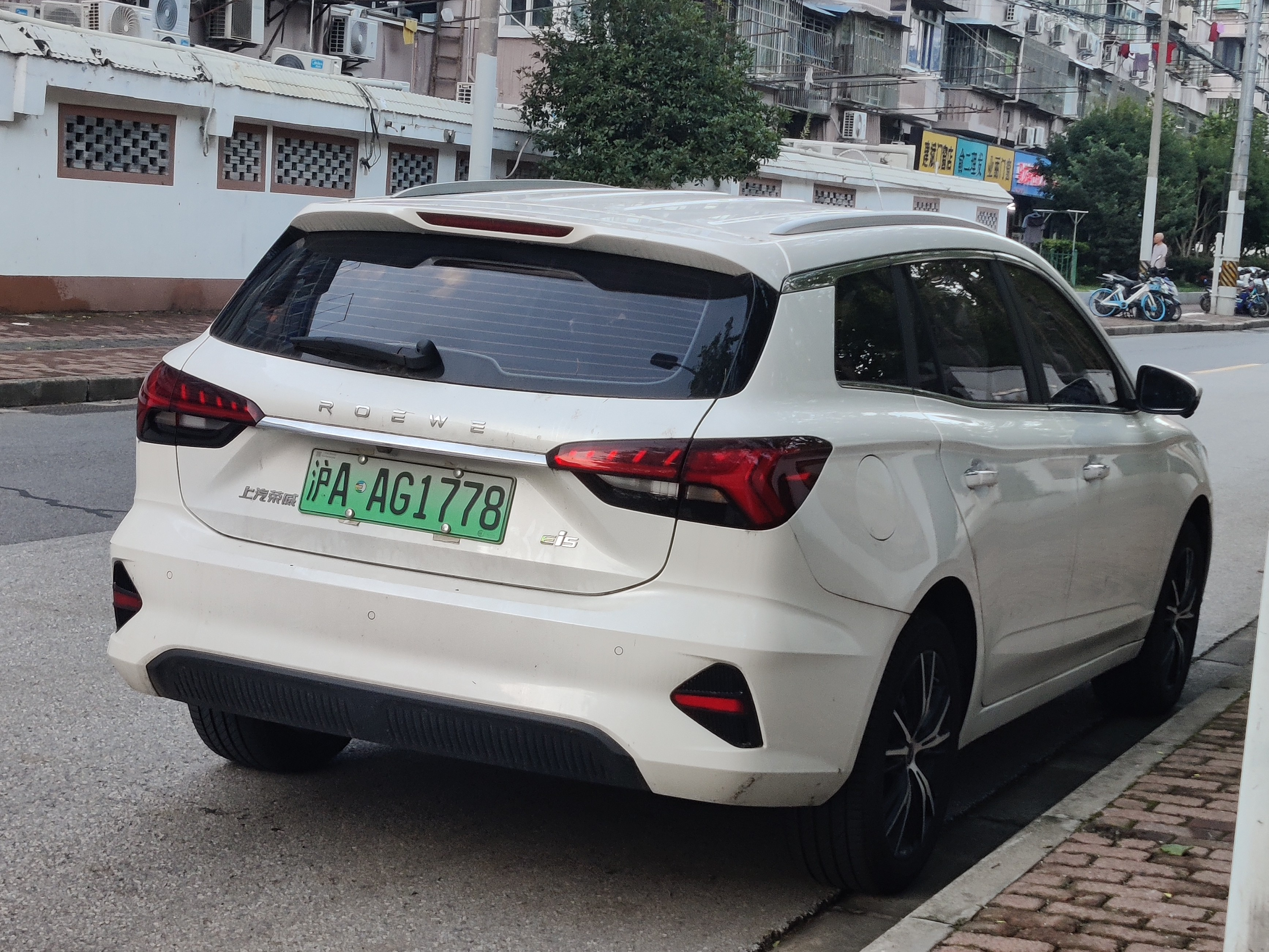
Rear view

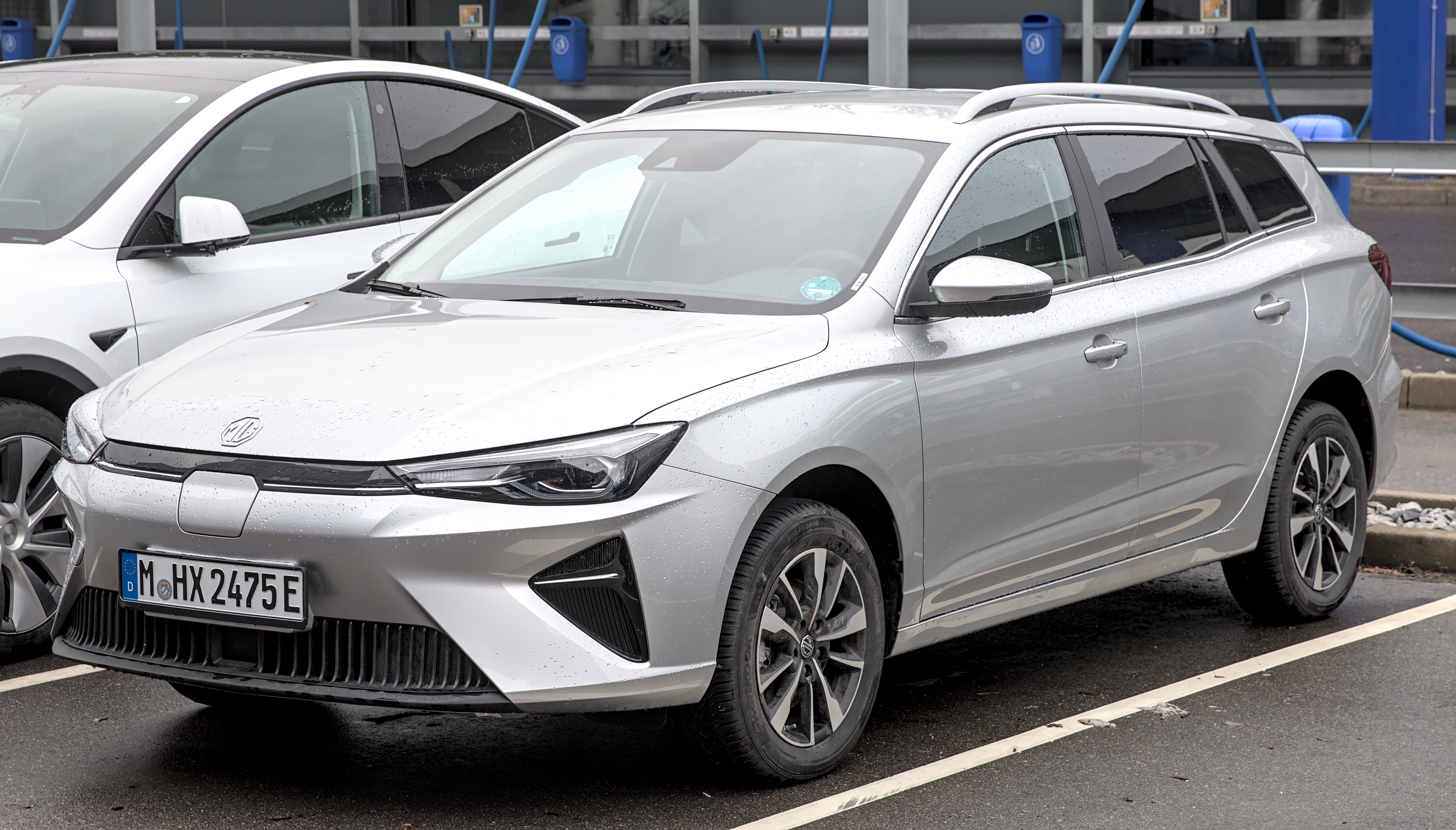
MG5 EV (Europe, facelift)

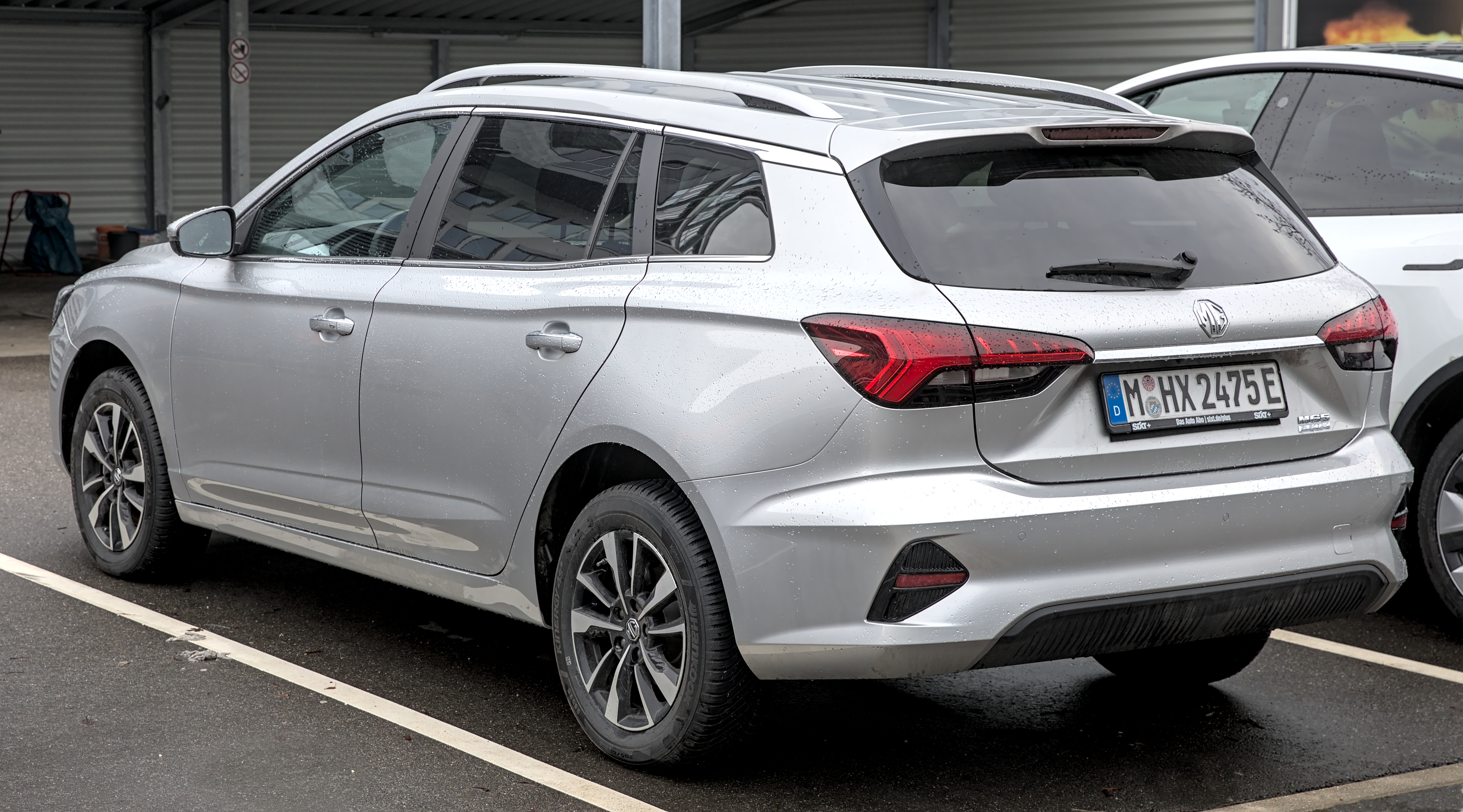
Rear view

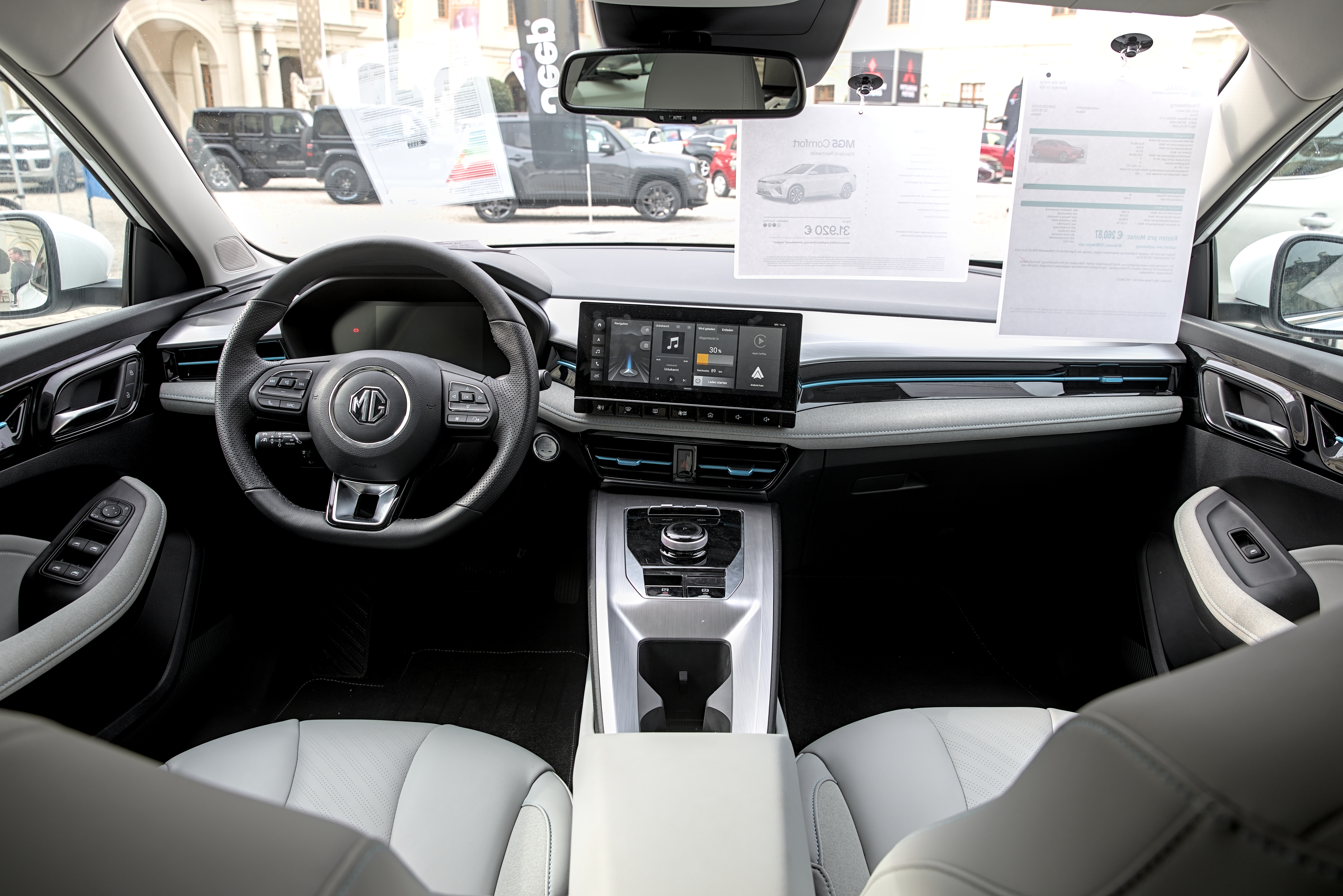
Interior (MG5 EV)

== Markets ==
=== Asia ===
==== Philippines ====
The MG5 Sedan was launched in the Philippines on 13 September 2019, with three trim levels: Core, Style, and Alpha, it is powered by a 1.5-litre petrol engine paired to either a 5-speed manual or a CVT.

The facelift model was launched in the Philippines on 9 April 2026, in the sole Prestige trim powered by the 1.5-litre petrol engine, and the pre-facelift MG5 continued to be sold alongside the facelift model.

==== Singapore ====
The MG5 EV was launched in Singapore on 4 September 2021, with two trim levels: Excite (50.3kWh) and Exclusive (61.1kWh).

==== Thailand ====
The EP was launched in Thailand on 26 November 2020 in a sole variant powered by a 50.3kWh battery. The facelifted model was launched in Thailand on 20 March 2023 as the ES, in a sole variant powered by the 51 kWh battery pack, and the pre-facelift EP continued to be sold alongside the facelift model.

==== Vietnam ====
The MG5 Sedan was launched in Vietnam on 25 September 2023, with three variants: 1.5 M/T, 1.5 CVT STD and 1.5 CVT DELUX. All variants are powered by a 1.5-litre petrol engine.

=== Europe ===
The MG5 EV or MG5 SW EV made its European debut starting in UK in September 2020. The facelift model debuted in Europe in March 2022. In December 2024, the MG5 SW EV was discontinued in Europe with existing stock lasted until early 2025.

=== Mexico ===
The MG5 Sedan was introduced alongside the ZS and HS in Mexico on 21 October 2020, marking the return of MG Motors in Mexico after 15 years. At launch, three trim levels are available: Style, Excite and Exclusive. All variants are powered by a 1.5-litre petrol engine paired to either a 5-speed manual or CVT. The facelift model was launched in Mexico on 5 November 2024, with the same trim levels from the pre-facelift model, except for the Exclusive trim replaced with the Elegance trim.

=== Middle East ===
The MG5 saloon was launched in the GCC countries on 29 July 2019. It is powered by the 1.5-litre petrol engine, and it is available in three trims; STD, COM and LUX.

The facelift model was introduced alongside the RX9 on 29 October 2024.

== Sales ==
Roewe i5
Year	China	Mexico (MG 5)
2018	66,533	—
2019	158,945	—
2020	128,804	375
2021	144,030	7,291
2022	97,997	23,148
2023	53,925	33,205
2024	60,811	26,768
2025	78,427	21,132

Roewe Ei5
Year	China	UK (MG 5)	Thailand (MG EP/ES)
2018	26,008		
2019	30,550		
2020	96,047	274	
2021	174,333	5,075	436
2022	48,554	7,030	2,393
2023	7,361	2,237	6,660 (Note: Sale figures includes both the pre-facelift MG EP and facelifted MG ES models.)
2024	3,060		2,140
2025	1,089		1,987
