= Roewe 350 =

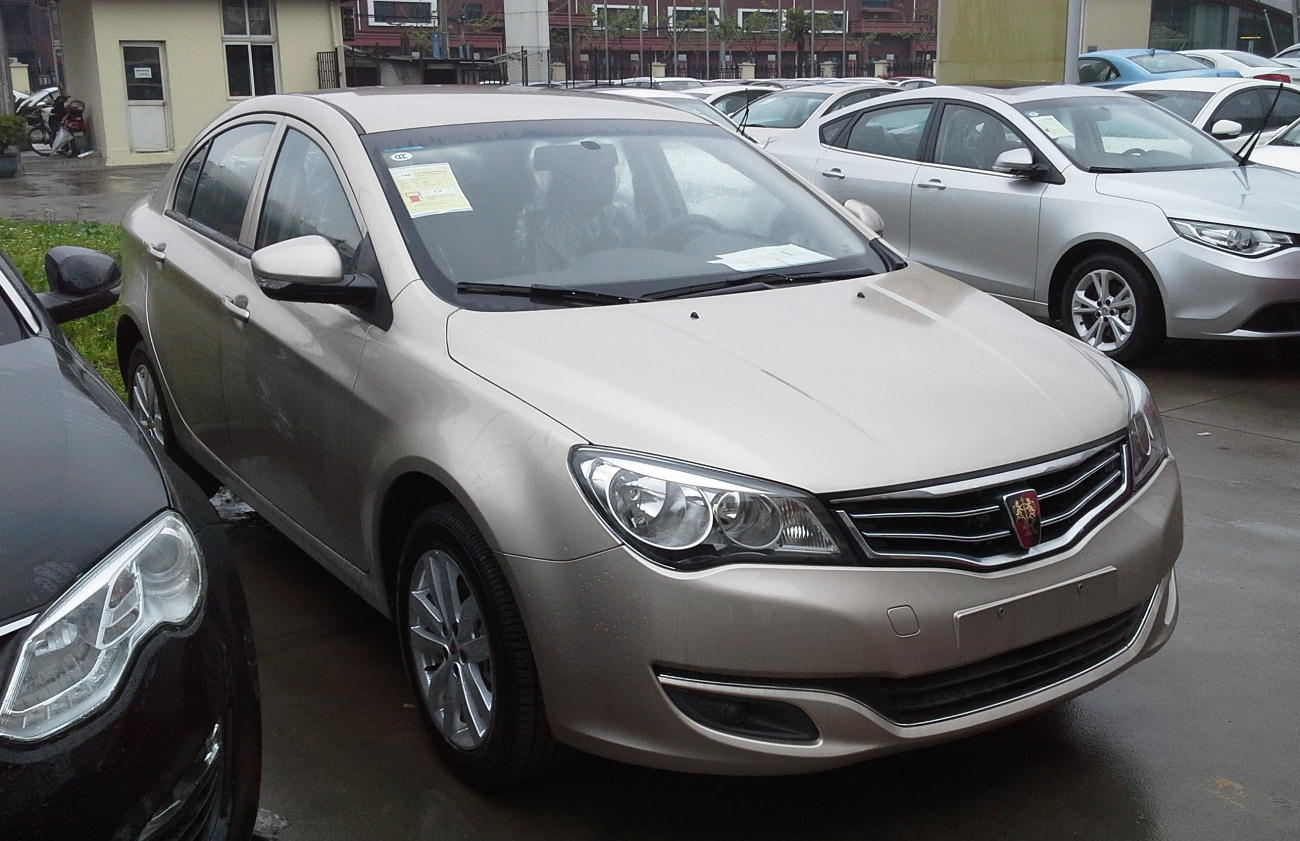
- Roewe 350 (facelift)

Overview
- Manufacturer: SAIC Motor
- Also called: MG 350 (export markets)
- Production: 2010–2014
- Model years: 2010–2015
- Assembly: China: Pukou, Nanjing

Body and chassis
- Class: Small family car (C)
- Body style: 4-door sedan
- Layout: FF layout
- Related: MG 5

Powertrain
- Engine: 1.5 L I4 (petrol); 2.0 L I4 (turbo petrol)
- Transmission: 6-speed manual; 5-speed manual; 6-speed automatic; 5-speed automatic; 4-speed automatic

Dimensions
- Wheelbase: 2,650 mm (104.3 in)
- Length: 4,521 mm (178.0 in)
- Width: 1,788 mm (70.4 in)
- Height: 1,492 mm (58.7 in)

Chronology
- Successor: Roewe 360

The Roewe 350 is a small family car or compact car produced by Roewe in China from 2010 to 2015. It is sold in international markets as the MG 350. Codenamed AP11, it shares the same automotive platform with the MG 5 hatchback, which entered production in 2011 as a 2012 model.

== Overview ==
The Roewe 350 debuted in concept car form at the 2009 Shanghai Auto Show as the Roewe N1, and was officially launched at the Beijing Auto Show in 2010 with a SAIC developed 1.5 L engine. The 1.5 L engine produces 146 hp, meanwhile the 2.0 litre turbo engine produces 247 hp. This engine was only offered in the Middle East and China.

The 350 is produced at a former Nanjing Automobile production base in Pukou. The price in China MSRP (Yuan) is from 89,700 to 124,700 (13,180 to US$18,320).

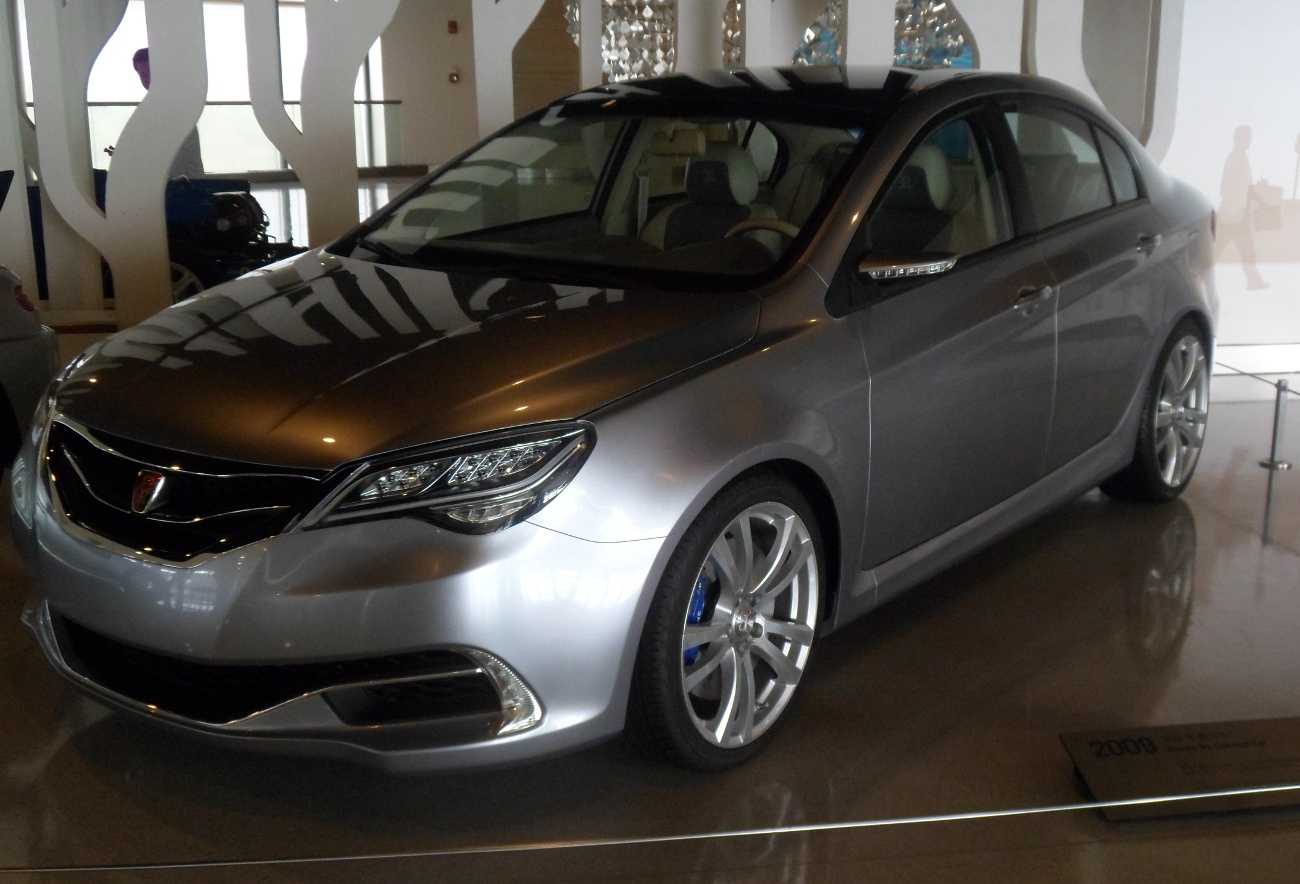
Roewe N1 Concept, prototype of the 350.

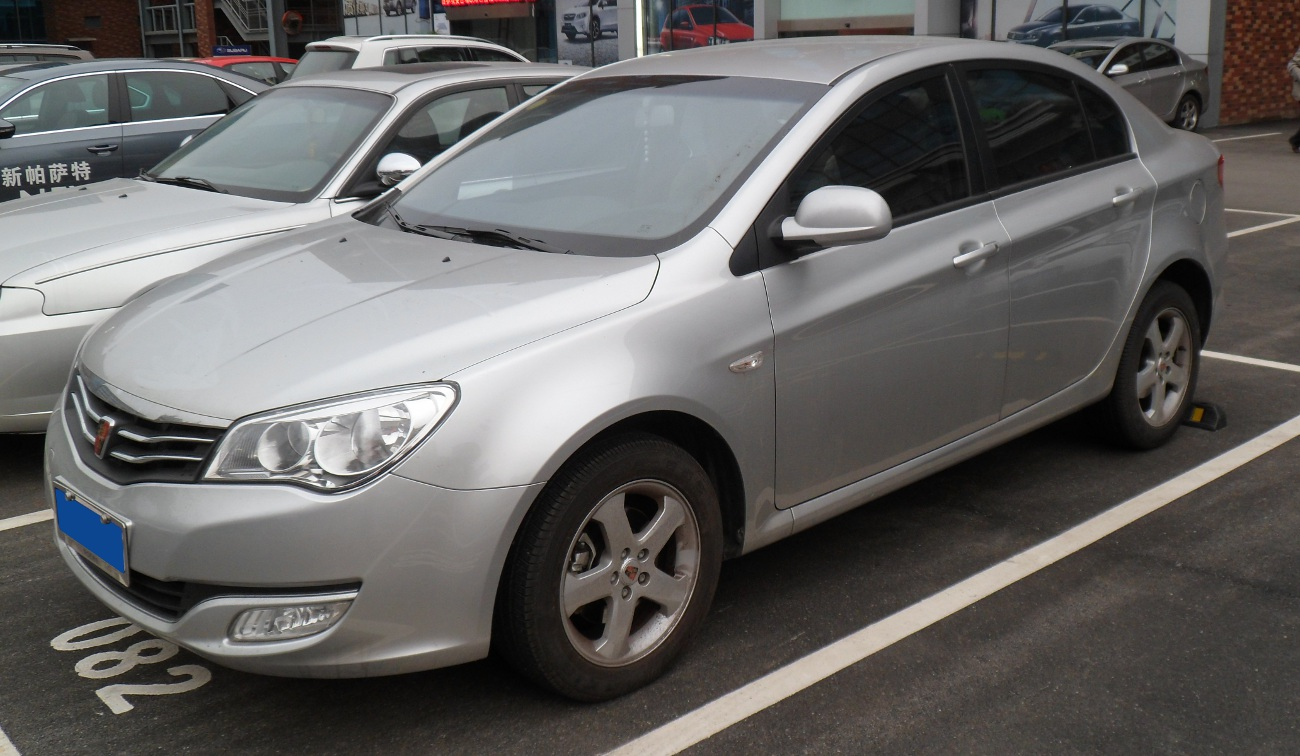
Roewe 350 (front).

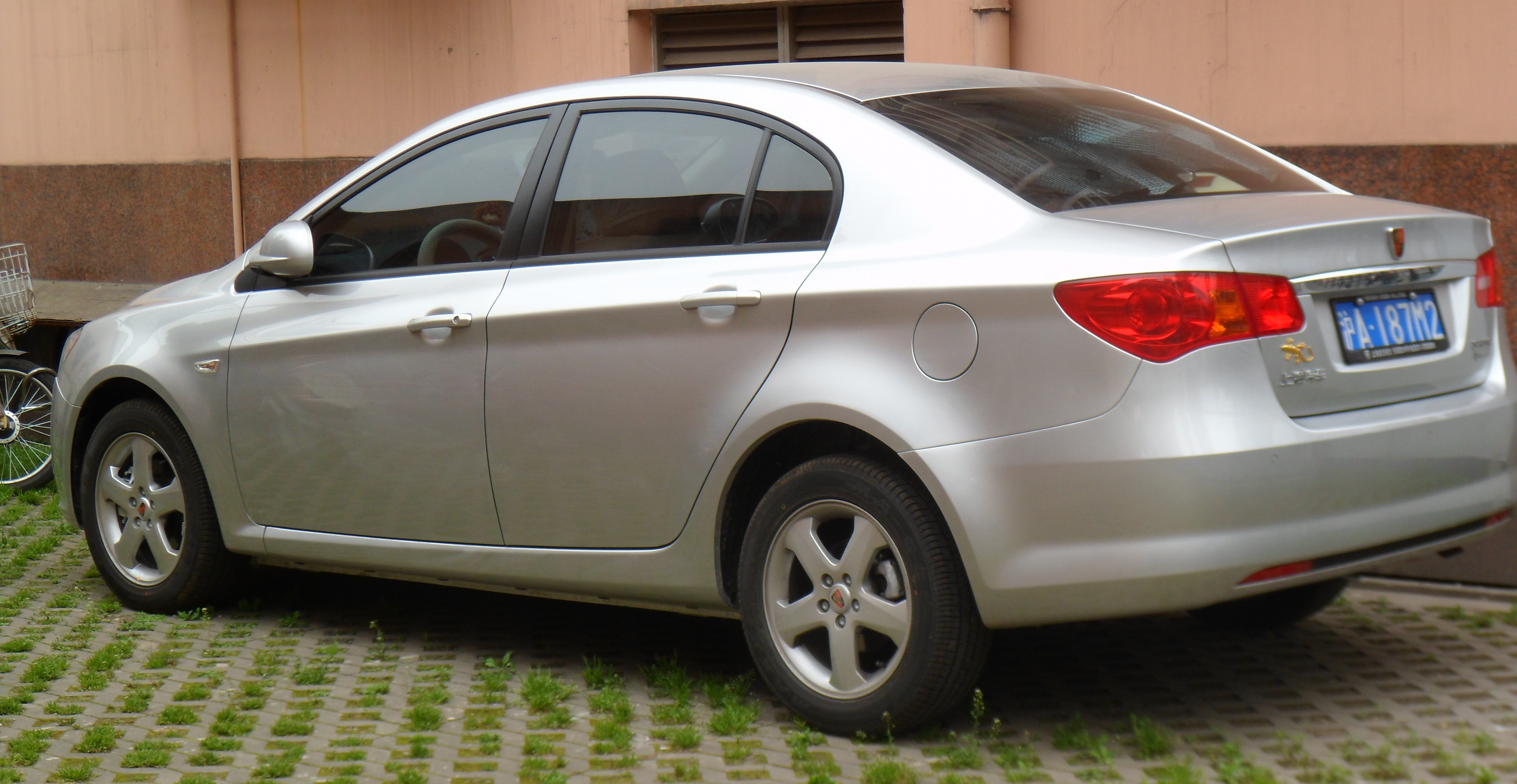
Roewe 350 (rear).

== MG 350 ==
The MG 350 offered in the Gulf Cooperation Council of the Middle East regional market is essentially a rebadged Roewe 350 offered in China. The MG 350 features a restyled front grille with the MG badge and slightly different tail lamp lenses. The MG 350 comes with a 1.5 litre 4-cylinder engine producing 107 hp and 135 Nm of torque mated to a 4-speed automatic gearbox. The MG 350 available in European markets is the first production car in the world with an Android operating System and 3G Internet access, with engine options including a 1.5 liter turbo engine producing 129 hp and a 1.5 liter engine producing 109 hp.

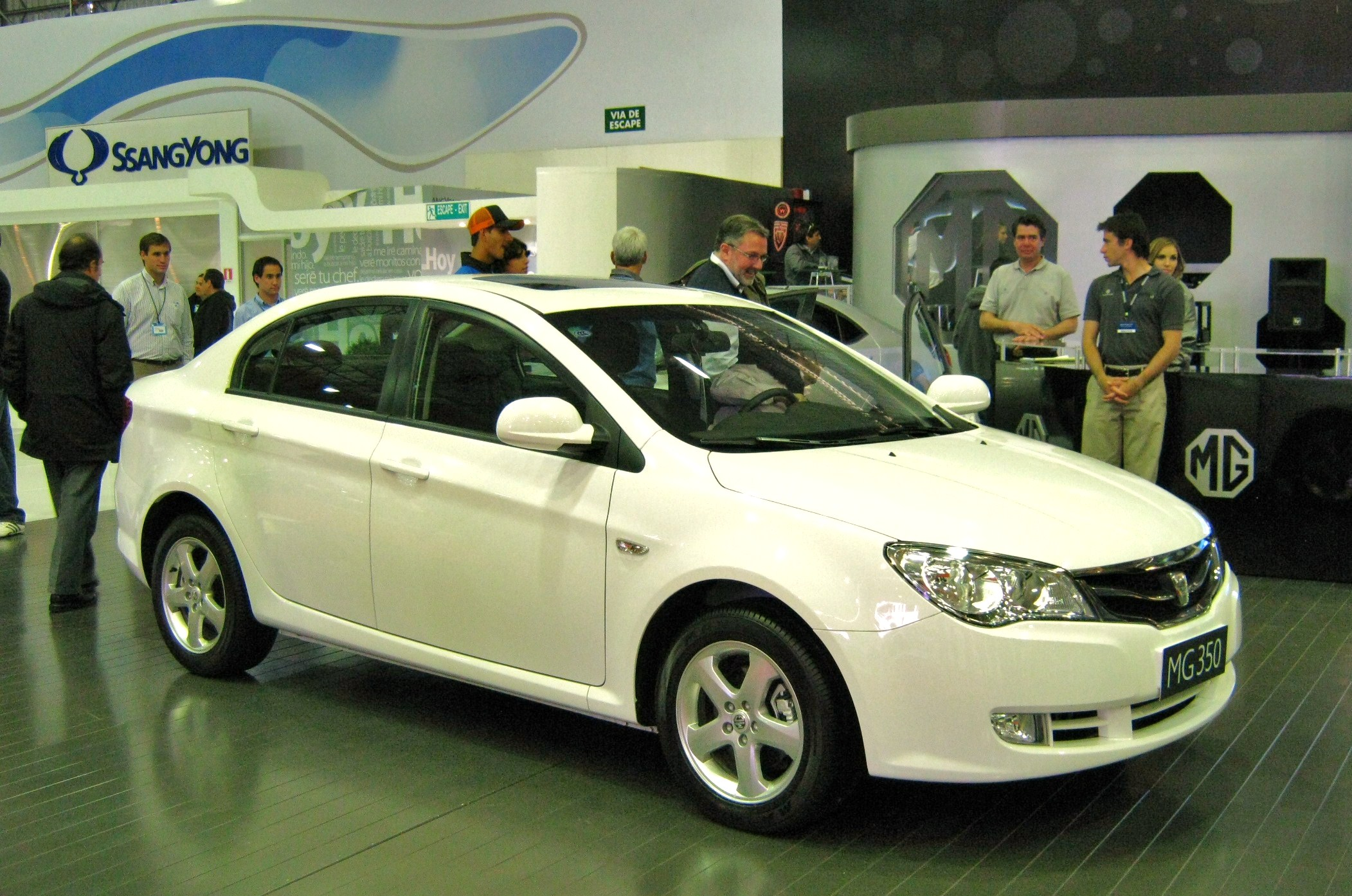
MG 350 (front).

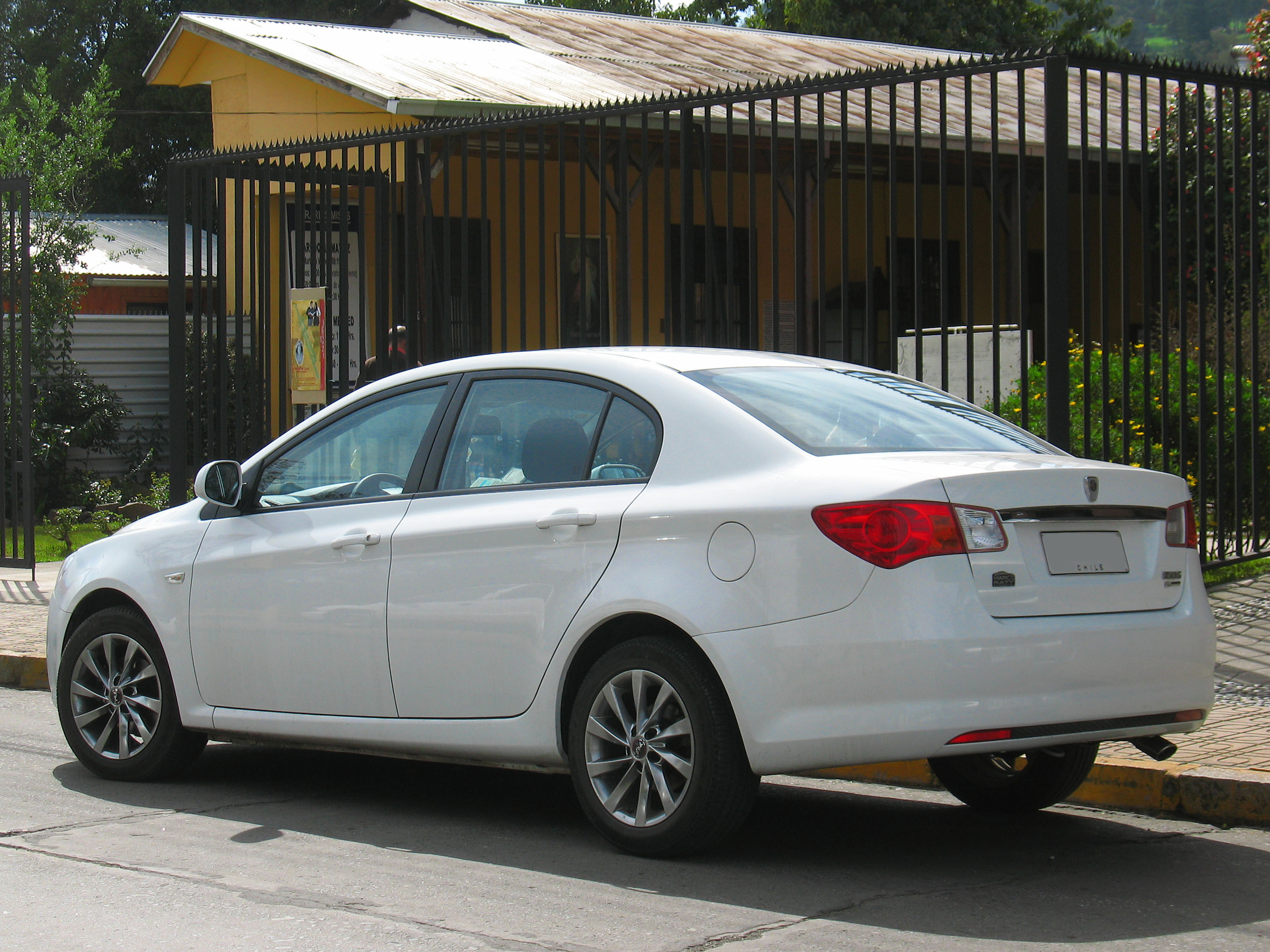
MG 350 (rear).

== Controversies with Ssangyong Motors ==
Originally it was planned as the B100 project from Ssangyong Motor. It started development in 2006, to compete with the Hyundai Avante and other compact cars in Korea. SAIC developed the Roewe 350 as the production version, but it never launched in the Korean market. SAIC planned for Ssangyong and its Korean partners to develop their version as subcontractors.
