= GSI =

GSI may refer to:

== Science and technology ==
- Geotechnical seismic isolation
- Geological Strength Index
- Gonadosomatic Index
- UK Government Secure Intranet
- Grid Security Infrastructure, a computer networking specification
- "Global Systems Integrator", large managed technology services providers
- GS-I (Cellulose synthase (UDP-forming)), an enzyme
- Great Sea Interconnector

== Businesses and organizations ==
=== Businesses ===
- Gemological Science International, gemstone identification/grading/appraisal services
- Geophysical Service Incorporated, an American petroleum exploration corporation
- Guangzhou Shipyard International, a Chinese state-owned shipbuilder
- GSI Commerce, now eBay Enterprise, an American e-commerce company

=== Scientific organizations ===
- GSI Helmholtz Centre for Heavy Ion Research, Germany
- Geographical Society of Ireland
- Geospatial Information Authority of Japan
- Geological Society of India
- Geological Survey of India
- Geological Survey of Ireland

=== Other organizations ===
- Global Security Initiative
- Gabinete de Segurança Institucional da Presidência da República (Institutional Security Bureau), Brazil
- Gustav Stresemann Institute, a German educational charity

== Other uses ==
- Graduate student instructor, a teaching fellow at some US universities
- Grand-Santi Airport, French Guiana (IATA code GSI)

== See also ==
- GSL (disambiguation)
- GS-1 (disambiguation), including GS1
- GS (disambiguation)
- GSIS (disambiguation)
