= GS-1 =

GS1, GS-1, GS 1, GS.1, may refer to:

== Organizations ==
- GS1, a not-for-profit international organization for barcode standards
- Gustav Siegfried Eins (station code "GS1"), a British black propaganda radio station during World War II
- Tatmadaw GS-1, the training and operations branch of the Myanmar Armed Forces

== Transportation ==
- Southern Pacific class GS-1, a Southern Pacific steam locomotive class
- Glisa Stanisavljevic GS-1, a Yugoslav glider; see List of Yugoslavian gliders
- Curtiss GS-1, a WW1 U.S. Navy scout triplane
- Blue Origin New Glenn first stage, space launch rocket booster stage

== Other uses ==
- Cellulose synthase (UDP-forming) (GS-1), a cellulose-synthesizing enzyme
- Yamaha GS-1, the first commercially released FM digital synthesizer, in 1980

== See also ==
- GS (disambiguation)
- GSI (disambiguation)
- GSL (disambiguation)
