= GSH =

GSH may refer to:

- Glutathione, an important antioxidant
- George S. Halas, owner and coach of the Chicago Bears
- Goshen Municipal Airport (IATA code), Indiana, USA
- Global Scholars Hall, a building on the University of Oregon campus, Eugene, Oregon, USA
- Ghost Squad Hackers, hacktivist group
- Good Shepherd Homes, a British charity
- Gryazev-Shipunov (GSh), a weapons marque

== See also ==
- GSHS (disambiguation)
- ГШ (disambiguation) (Russian: GSh)
- GS (disambiguation)
