= GSHS =

GSHS may refer to:

- Garden Spot High School
- Garner Magnet High School, formerly Garner Senior High School
- George Stephenson High School
- Gibson Southern High School
- Gladstone State High School
- Glenbard South High School
- Glenwood Springs High School
- Grand Saline High School
- Great Sankey High School
- Greenville Senior High School (Greenville, South Carolina)
- Gulf Shores High School
- Gyeonggi Science High School
- Global School-based Student Health Survey, a measure of school violence
- George Steinbrenner High School, Lutz, Florida

== See also ==
- GS (disambiguation)
- GSH (disambiguation)
