= GS =

GS may stand for:

== Business, politics, and government ==
- Goldman Sachs, one of the world's largest global investment banks
- GS Group, a Korean company that is a spin-off from the LG Group
- GS (Swedish union), a trade union in Sweden
- Génération.s, a political party in France
- Freedom Movement (Slovenia), Slovene: Gibanje Svoboda, a political party
- Gagasan Sejahtera, an informal coalition of opposition Islamist political parties in Malaysia
- Gaudium et spes, a constitution (document) of the Second Vatican Council
- General Schedule (US civil service pay scale), a prefix designating a pay grade in the US civil service

== Arts, media, and entertainment ==
=== Music ===
- Group Sounds, a genre of Japanese music
- Roland GS, an extension of General MIDI electronic musical instruments' specification by Roland Corporation
- GS Boyz (explicitly G-Spot Boyz), an American hip hop group from Arlington, Texas
- GrimSkunk, rock band from Montreal, Canada
- Glintshake (Russian: ГШ), Russian rock band

=== Movies ===
- Gabbar Singh, 2012 Indian film abbreviated GS

=== Gaming and sports ===
- Global Star Software, a former Canadian video game publisher
- Pokémon Gold and Silver, installments of the Pokémon series of video games
- Grand Slam (disambiguation), a term used in several sports
- Galatasaray S.K., a Turkish sports club
- Games started, a baseball statistic
- Giant slalom skiing, an alpine skiing discipline
- Goal shooter, a position in netball
- Golden State Warriors, a professional NBA basketball team based in San Francisco, California
- GS Pétroliers (handball), an Algerian handball team

== Places ==
- Gansu, a province of China (Guobiao abbreviation GS)
- South Georgia and the South Sandwich Islands (ISO country code GS), a British Overseas Territory in the southern Atlantic Ocean

== Science and technology ==
=== Biology and medicine ===
- G_{s} alpha subunit, a subtype of G-protein coupled receptors
- Gilbert's syndrome, a liver enzyme disorder which can cause elevated levels of serum bilirubin
- Gitelman syndrome, an autosomal recessive kidney tubule disorder
- Geopathic stress, a pseudoscientific condition

=== Computing ===
- GS, a group separator character in the C0 control code set
- .gs, Internet country code top-level domain of South Georgia and the South Sandwich Islands
- GS register, in the X86 computer architecture
- Ghostscript, a free software suite for handling PostScript and Portable Document Format (PDF) files
- Apple IIGS, the most powerful model in the Apple II computer line

=== Other uses in science and technology ===
- GS, the METAR reporting code for graupel or hail smaller than 5 millimetres (0.20 in) in diameter
- g-force, measured in "g's"
- Geprüfte Sicherheit, a safety mark appearing on technical equipment
- Gryazev-Shipunov (Russian: Грязев-Шипунов (ГШ), romanized: GSh), Soviet weapons marque

== Transportation ==
=== Aerospace ===
- Glide slope, part of the instrument landing system used by aircraft
- Ground segment, in space systems
- Tianjin Airlines, by IATA code

=== Automobiles ===
- Citroën GS, a French compact car lineup
- Geely Emgrand GS, a Chinese compact crossover
- Lexus GS, a Japanese executive sedan
- MG GS, a British compact SUV

==== Trim lines ====
- Buick Gran Sport, an American high-performance sports package series
- Toyota G Sports, a Japanese high-performance package series

=== Motorcycles ===
- BMW GS, a German dual purpose off-road/on-road motorcycle series
- Suzuki GS series, a Japanese road motorcycle series

== Other uses ==
- Columbia University School of General Studies, one of three undergraduate colleges at Columbia University in New York City

== See also ==
- G (disambiguation)
- SG (disambiguation)
- GSH (disambiguation)
