= GSIS =

GSIS may refer to:

== Education ==
- German Swiss International School, Hong Kong
- German Swiss International School (Ghana)
- Good Shepherd International School, Ooty, Tamil Nadu, India
- Josef Korbel School of International Studies (formerly named Graduate School of International Studies) of the University of Denver
- Gyeonggi Suwon International School, South Korea

== Other uses ==
- Geoscience Information Society, United States
- Government Service Insurance System, Philippines
- GSIS Museo ng Sining, an art museum in Pasay, Philippines

== See also ==
- GSI (disambiguation)
