= MG HS =

Compact crossover SUV

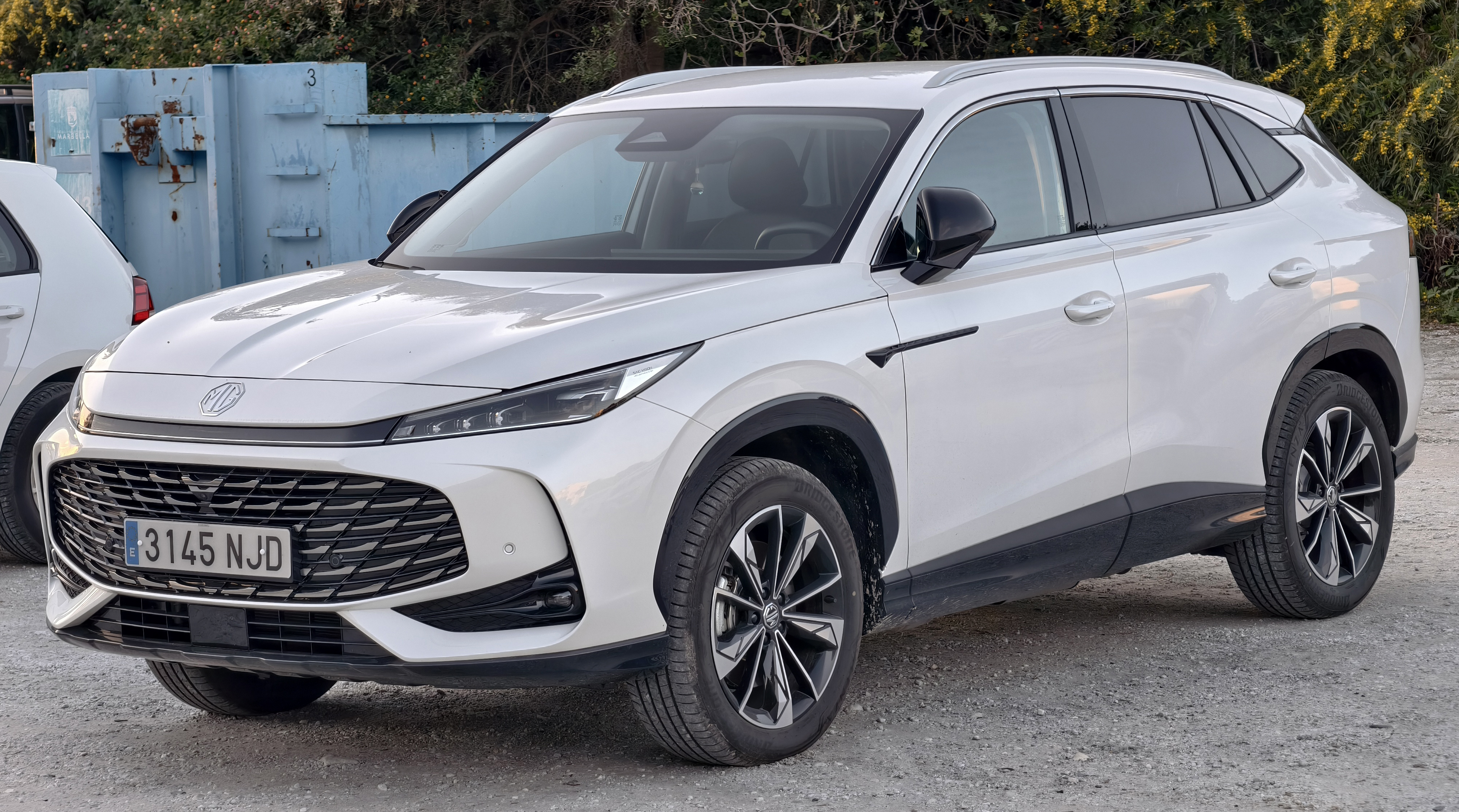
- Second generation MG HS

Overview
- Manufacturer: SAIC Motor
- Production: 2018–present

Body and chassis
- Class: Compact crossover SUV
- Body style: 5-door SUV
- Layout: Front-engine, front-wheel-drive Front-engine, all-wheel-drive

Chronology
- Predecessor: MG GS

The MG HS is a compact crossover SUV manufactured by Chinese automobile manufacturer SAIC Motor under the British MG marque. The vehicle was launched in 2018, replacing the MG GS. In MG's global line-up, the HS is positioned above the subcompact ZS.

The second generation HS was launched in 2024 as a rebranded and redesigned version of the Chinese market second generation Roewe RX5.

== First generation (AS23; 2018) ==
First generation
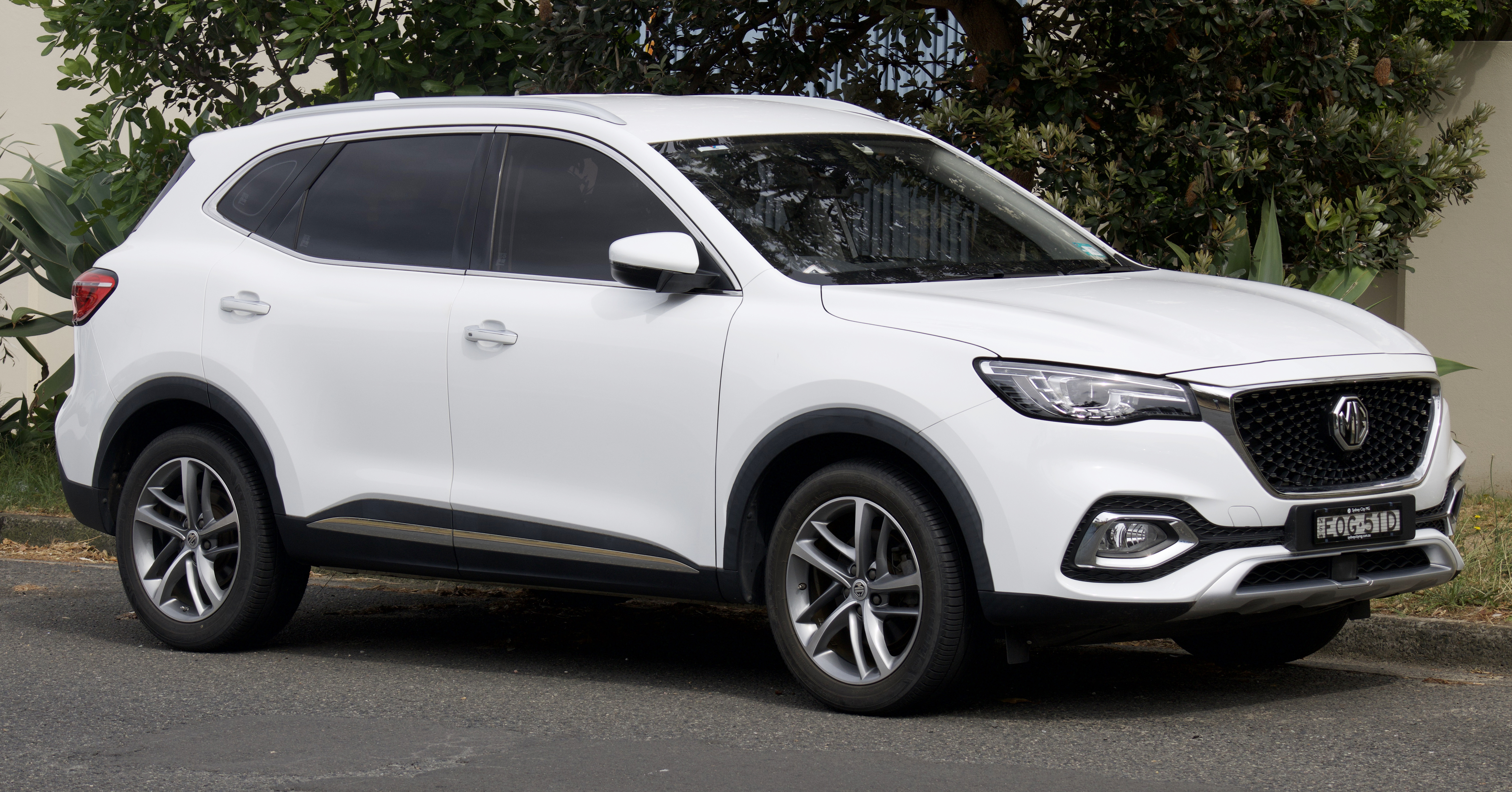
- 2022 MG HS Excite

Overview
- Model code: AS23
- Also called: MG EHS (Europe, plug-in hybrid); MG Linghang (China, facelift)
- Production: September 2018 – present
- Assembly: China: Ningde, Fujian; Thailand: Laem Chabang (SAIC-CP); Pakistan: Lahore (MG JW); Taiwan: Taoyuan (CMC)
- Designer: Anthony Williams-Kenny

Body and chassis
- Related: Roewe RX5; MG GS

Powertrain
- Engine: Petrol: 1.5 L SGE LFV turbo I4; 1.5 L SGE LYX TGI FFV I4 turbo (Thailand); 2.0 L MGE 20L4E I4 turbo; Petrol plug-in hybrid: 1.5 L SGE NetBlue + SAIC EDU turbo I4
- Electric motor: Permanent magnet synchronous motor (PHEV)
- Transmission: 6-speed manual; 6-speed DCT; 7-speed Sportronic DCT; 10-speed EDU II automatic (6-speed engine and 4-speed electric motor; PHEV)
- Hybrid drivetrain: Plug-in hybrid
- Battery: 16.6 kWh lithium-ion (PHEV)
- Electric range: 41.6 mi (67 km) (PHEV, claimed)

Dimensions
- Wheelbase: 2,720 mm (107.1 in)
- Length: 4,574–4,610 mm (180.1–181.5 in)
- Width: 1,876 mm (73.9 in)
- Height: 1,664–1,685 mm (65.5–66.3 in)
- Kerb weight: 1,523–1,775 kg (3,358–3,913 lb)

The first generation HS is the production model of the concept MG X-Motion. It debuted at the 2018 Beijing Auto Show. Engine options of the MG HS include a 1.5-litre inline-four turbo petrol engine producing 169 hp (171 PS; 126 kW), and a 2.0-litre inline-four turbo petrol engine, producing 231 hp (234 PS; 172 kW).

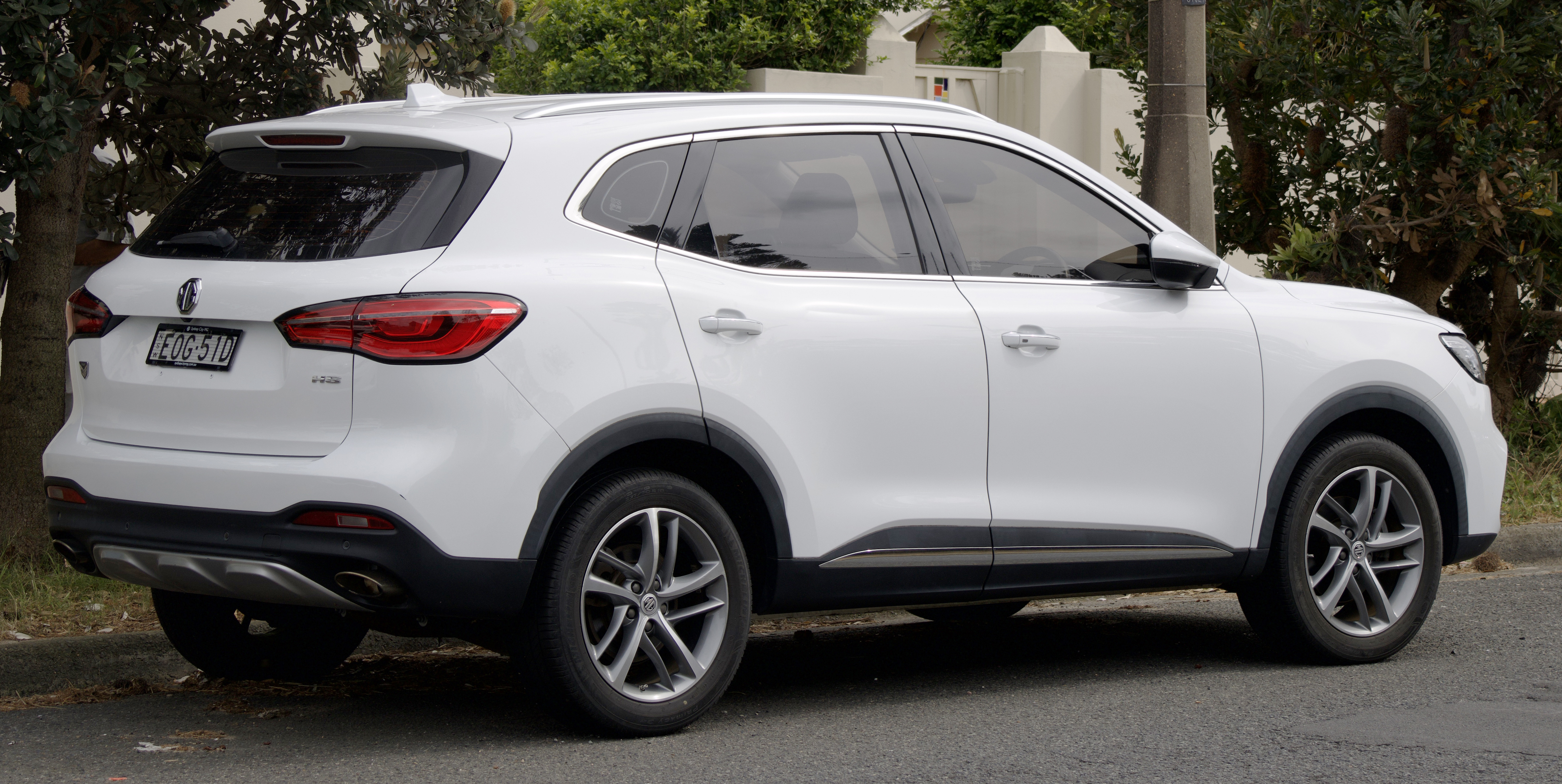
Rear view

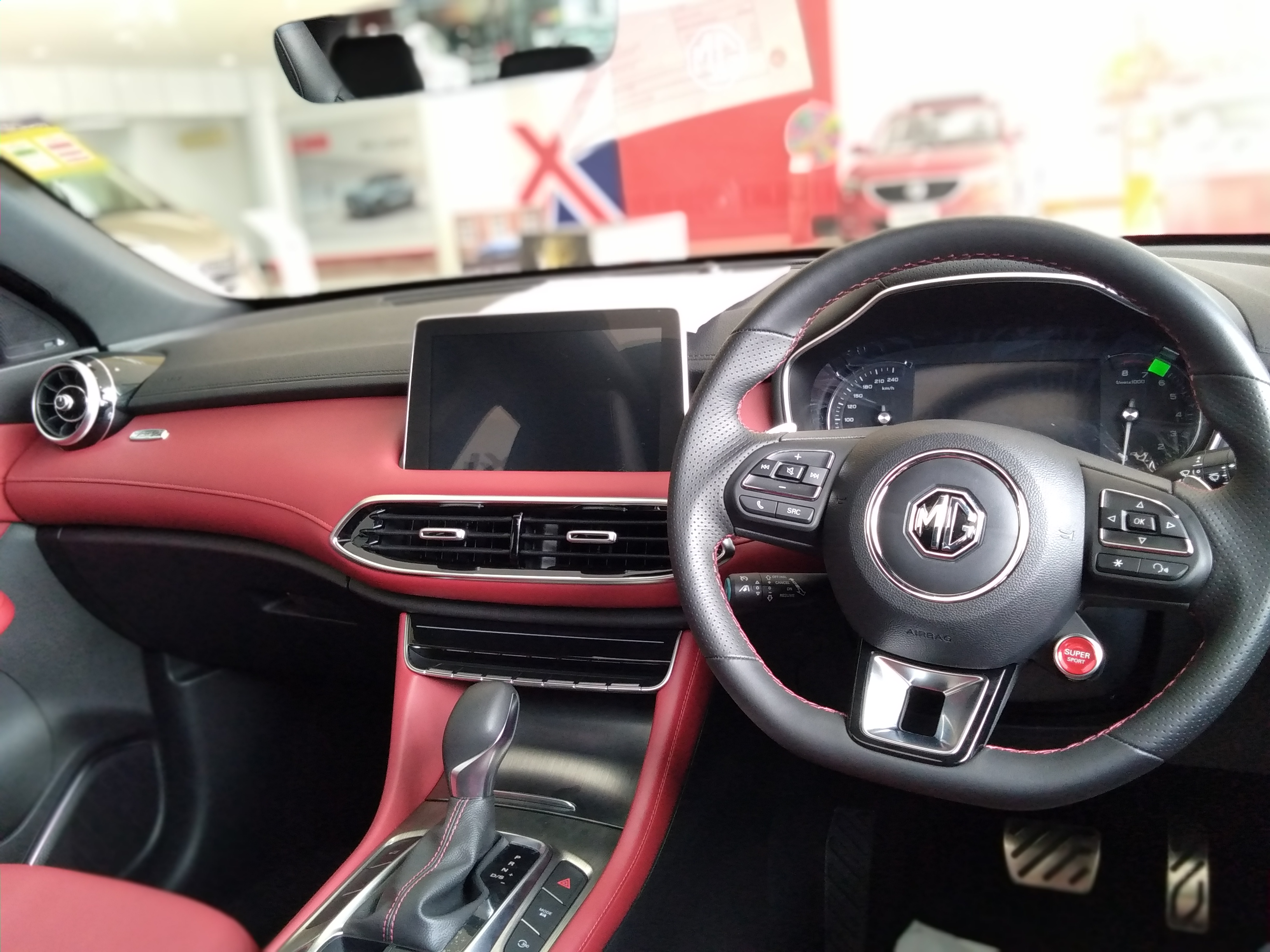
Interior

=== Safety ===
The HS is equipped with a standard emergency braking system and lane assist, bundled in the MG Pilot kit. Cars are fitted with automatic dual-clutch transmission (DCT) and are also augmented with a traffic jam, which can track the vehicle up to 56 km/h (35 mph) in front of them. The adaptive cruise control system is also given along with eight airbags, hill descent control (HDC), antilock braking system (ABS) and electronic brakeforce distribution (EBD). It was rated with five stars by Euro NCAP tests.

Euro NCAP test results* MG HS (2019)
| Test | Points | % |
|---|---|---|
| Overall: | 5 /5 stars | |
| Adult occupant: | 35.2 | 92% |
| Child occupant: | 40.0 | 81% |
| Pedestrian: | 30.8 | 64% |
| Safety assist: | 9.9 | 76% |

ANCAP test results* MGS HS all petrol variants (PHEV variants unrated) (2019, aligned with Euro NCAP)
| Test | Points | % |
|---|---|---|
| Overall: | 5 /5 stars | |
| Adult occupant: | 35.2 | 92% |
| Child occupant: | 40.9 | 83% |
| Pedestrian: | 30.8 | 64% |
| Safety assist: | 10 | 77% |

=== eHS / HS Plug-in / HS PHEV ===
The plug-in hybrid version of the HS is the first model to feature MG’s all-new hybrid powertrain, which comprises a turbocharged 1.5-litre four-cylinder petrol engine, a 16.6 kWh (60 MJ) battery pack and a 90 kW (121 hp; 122 PS) electric motor. It is mated to a 10-speed EDU II transmission, which consists of 6-speed automatic transmission for the internal combustion engine and a 4-speed automatic transmission for the electric motor.

Its powertrain generates a maximum output of 291 PS (287 hp; 214 kW) (258 PS (254 hp; 190 kW) in the United Kingdom) and 480 N⋅m (49 kg⋅m; 354 lb⋅ft) of torque (370 N⋅m (38 kg⋅m; 273 lb⋅ft) in the UK), enough for a 0-to-100 km/h time of 5.8 seconds (6.9 seconds in the UK) and a maximum all-electric range of 32 miles (51 km).

In Thailand, It generates a maximum output of 284 PS (280 hp; 209 kW) and 480 N⋅m (49 kg⋅m; 354 lb⋅ft) of torque, enough for a 0–60 mph (0–97 km/h) time of 7.5 seconds and a maximum all-electric range of 67 km (42 miles).

In Australia, it produces 258 PS (254 hp; 190 kW) and 370 N⋅m (38 kg⋅m; 273 lb⋅ft), and offers 63 kilometres (39 mi) of all-electric range.

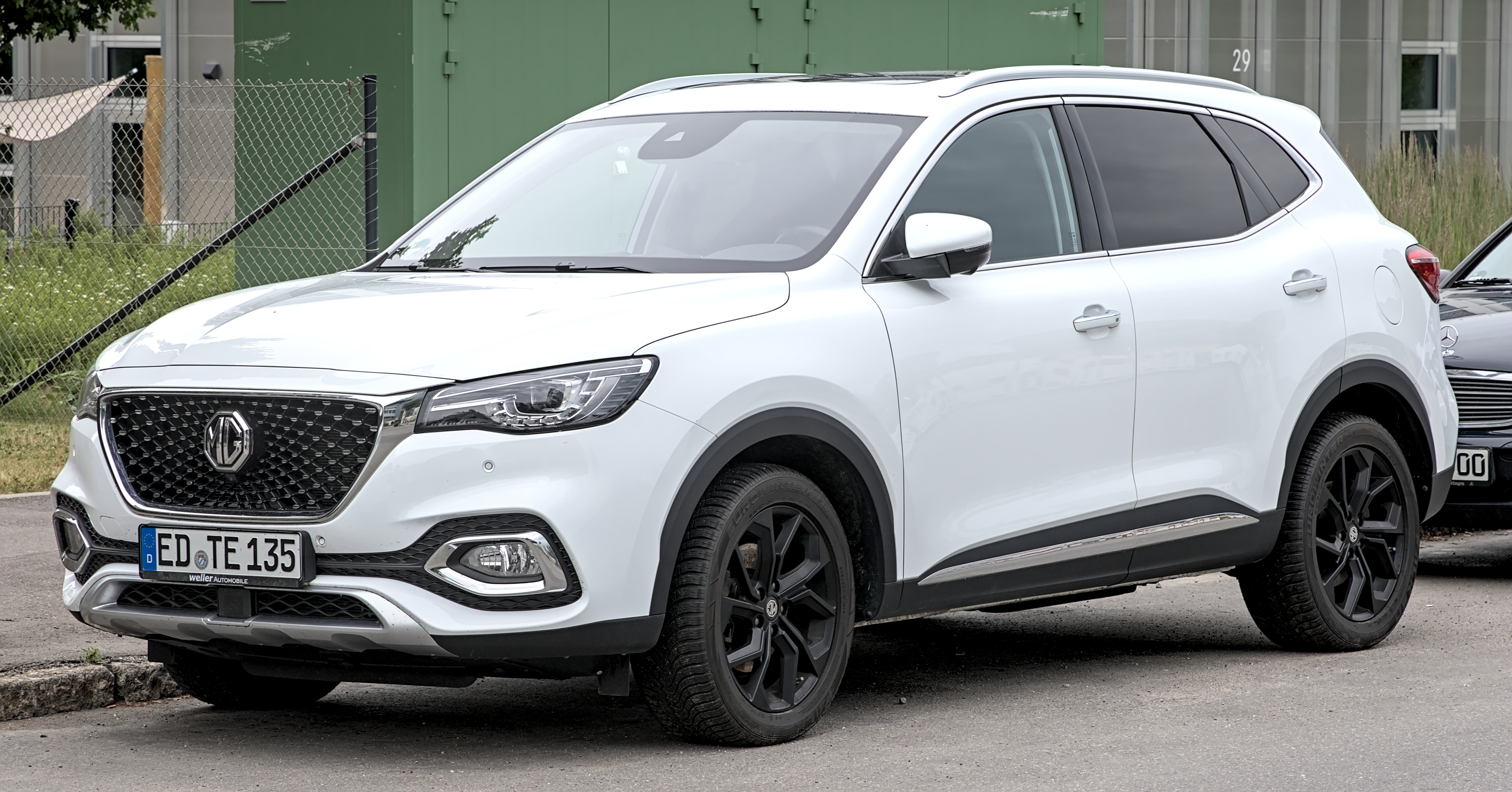
MG eHS (pre-facelift)

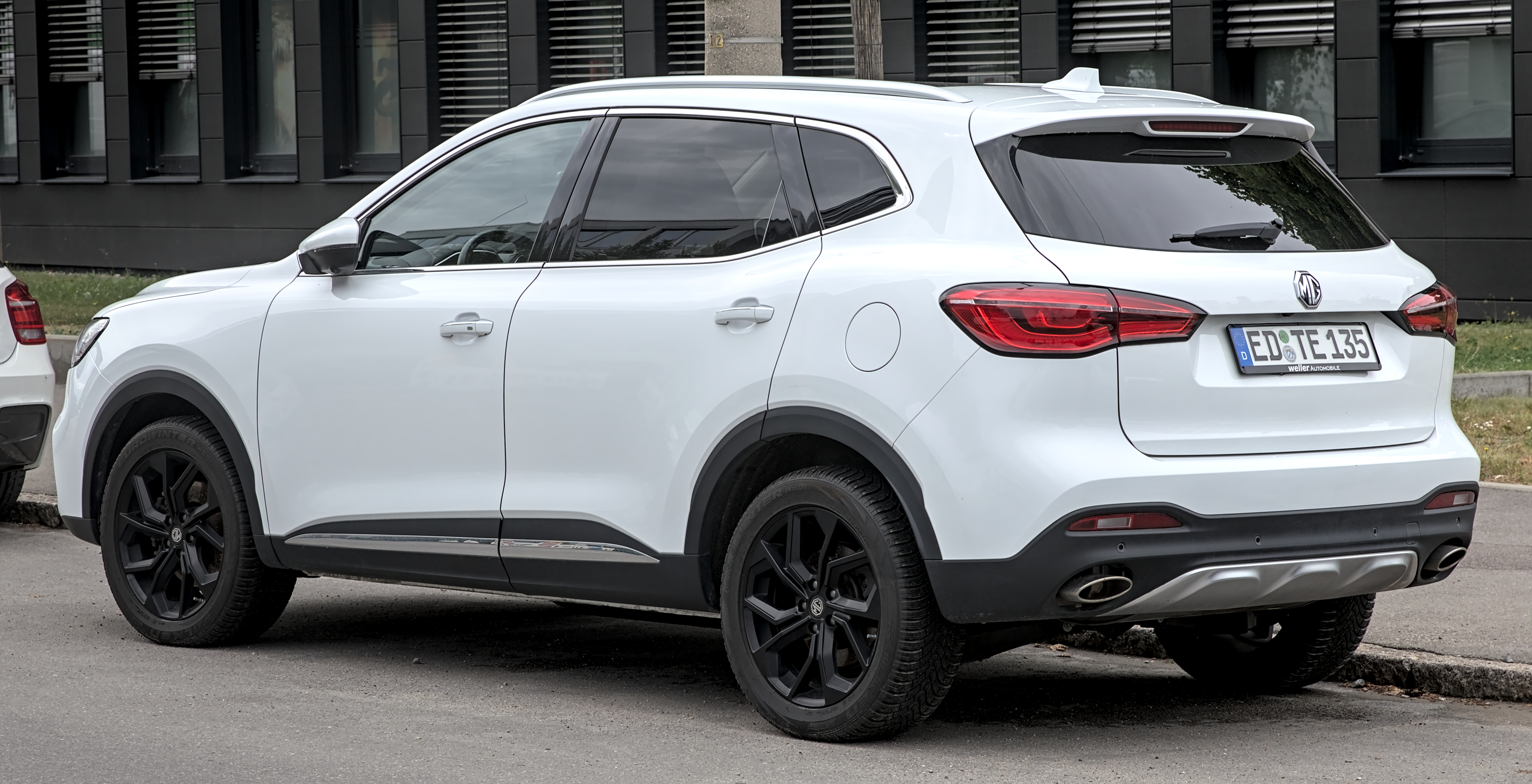
MG eHS (pre-facelift)

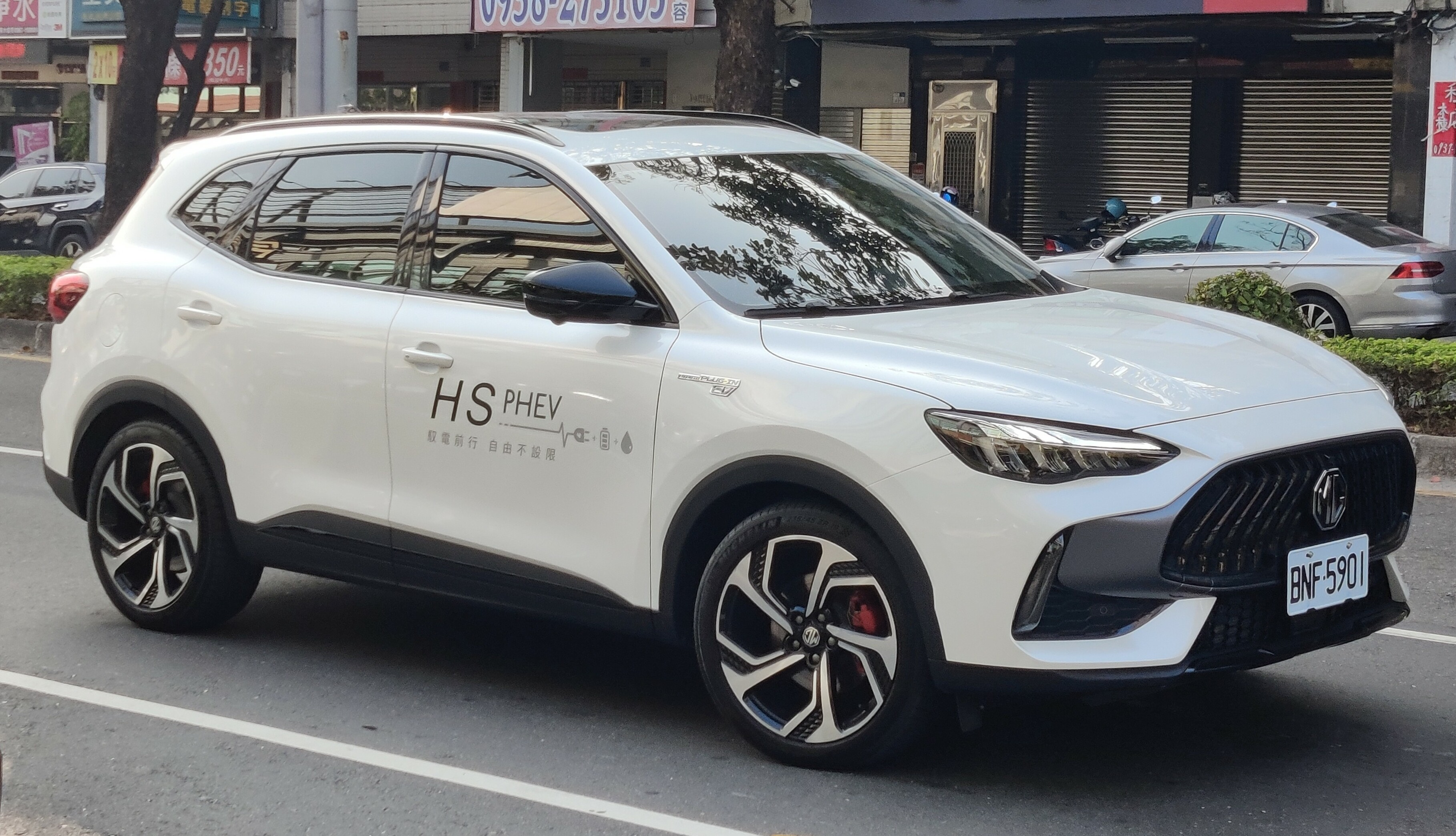
MG HS PHEV (facelift)

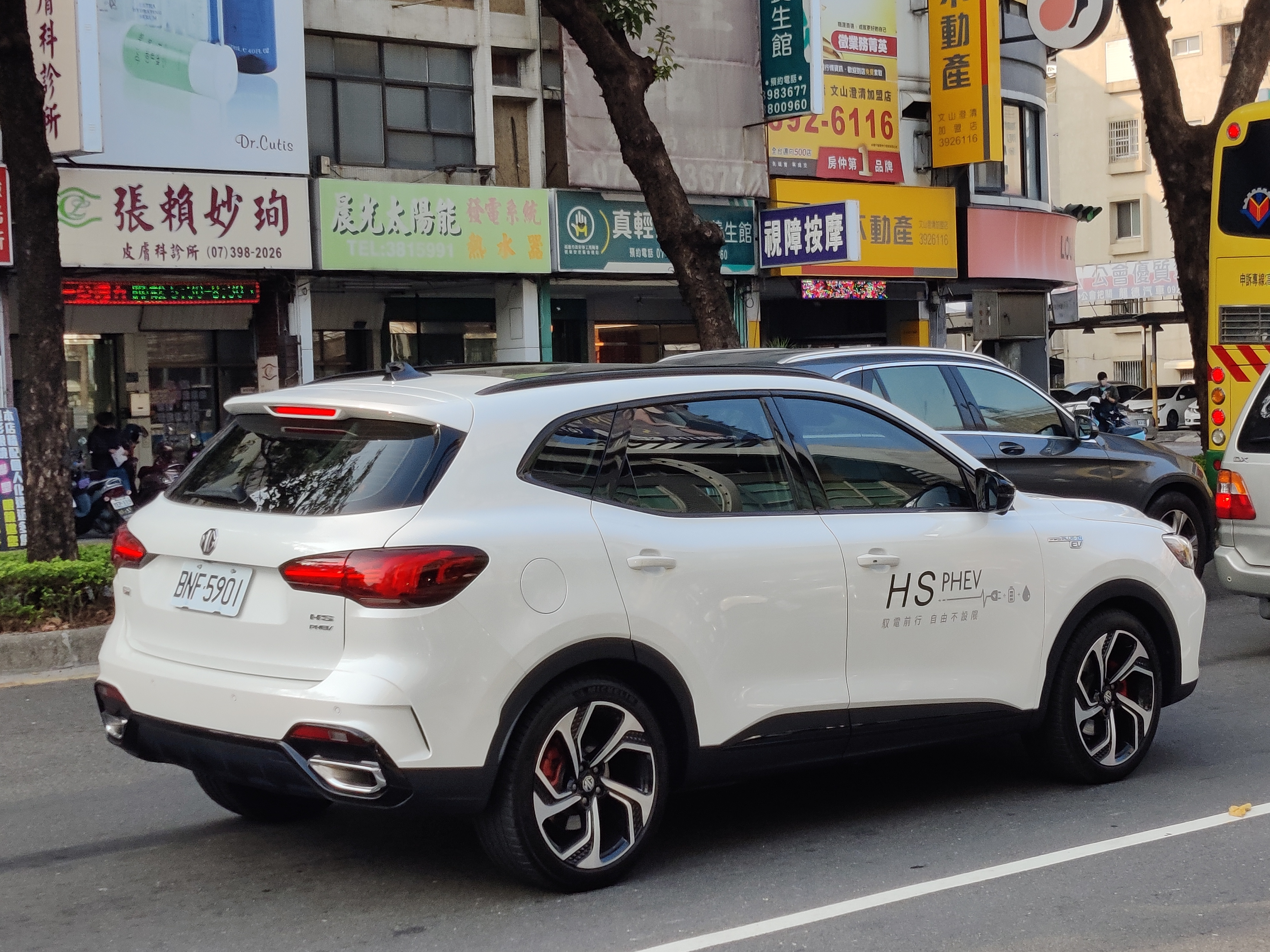
MG HS PHEV (facelift)

=== Facelift ===
In September 2020, the facelifted HS made its appearance at the 2020 Auto China in Beijing as the MG Linghang (Chinese: 领航). The Linghang, which is often also translated as Navigator, is the name given to the mid-life facelift of the HS, featuring the "third-generation design language" according to SAIC. The Linghang and the second-generation MG 5 are the first models to feature the newer MG family design language. The MG Pilot is 46 mm (1.8 in) longer, and 21 mm (0.8 in) taller than the HS, being 4,610 mm (181.5 in) long and 1,685 mm (66.3 in) tall.

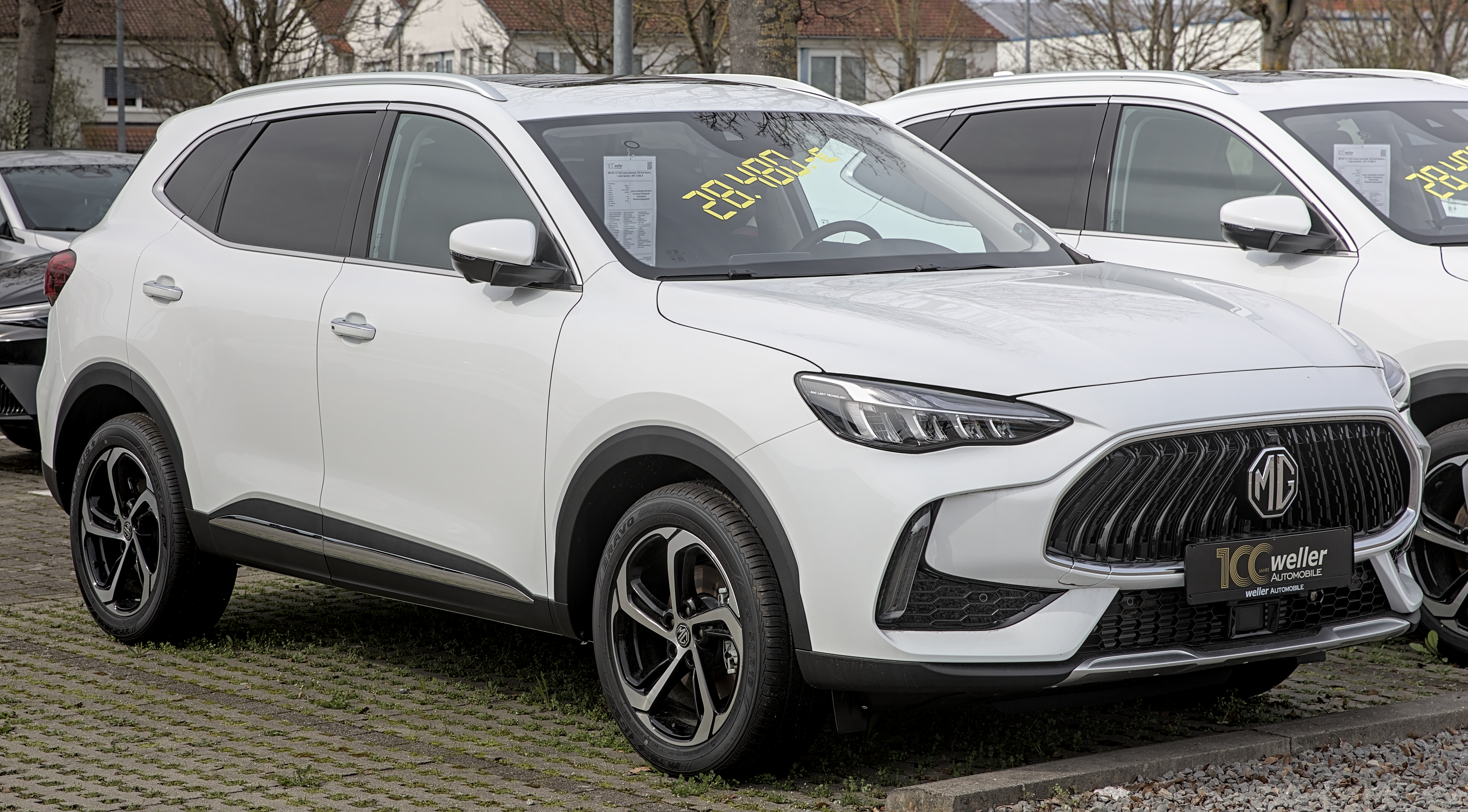
Front (facelift)

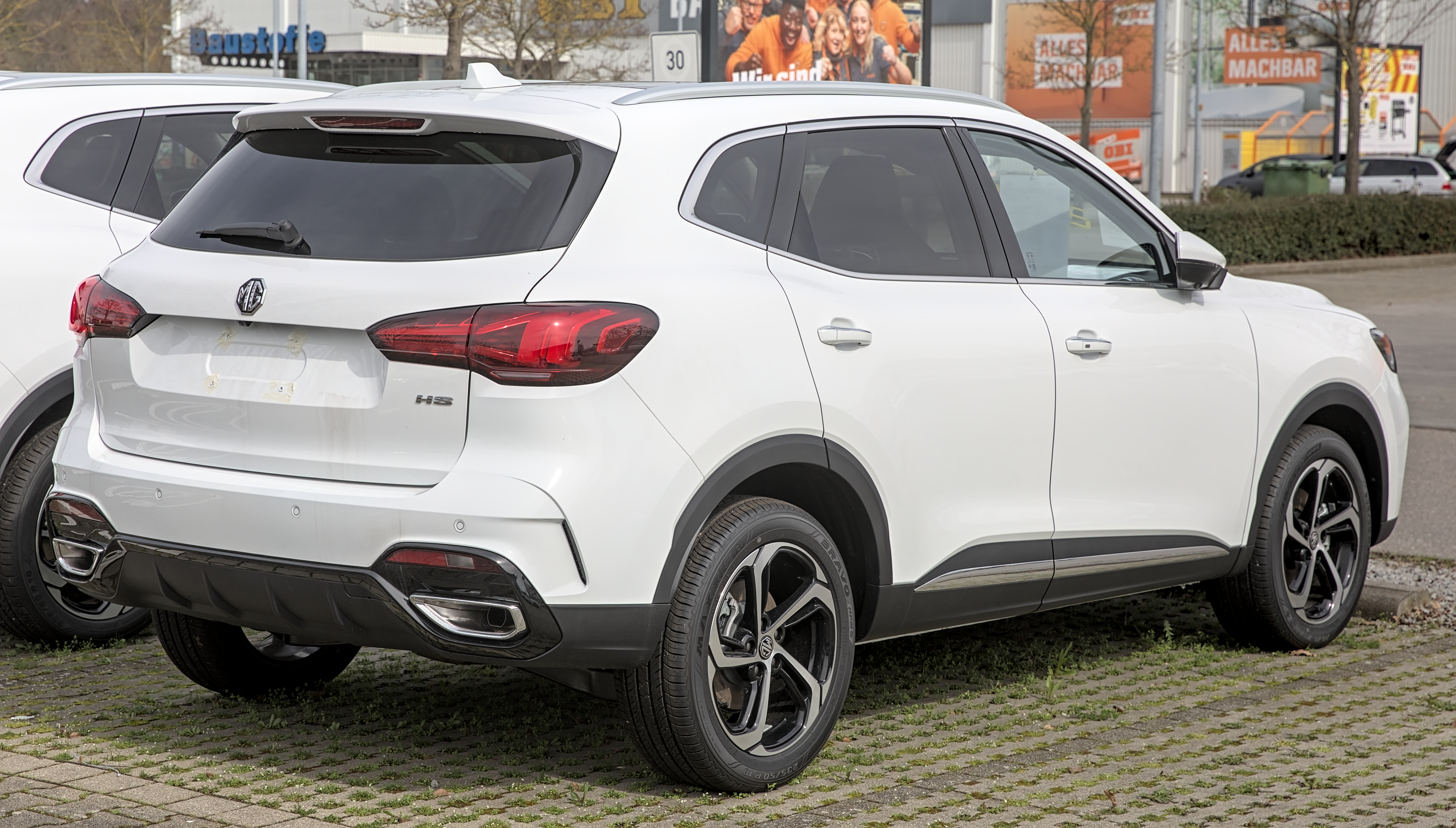
Rear (facelift)

=== Powertrain ===
Specs
| Model | Years | Layout | Engine | Transmission | Power | Torque | 0–100 km/h (0–62 mph) (Official) | Top speed |
|---|---|---|---|---|---|---|---|---|
| HS | 2018–present | FWD | 1.5L Turbo I4 | 6-speed manual | 119 kW (162 PS; 160 hp) at 5,600 rpm | 250 N⋅m (184 lb⋅ft) at 1,700–4,400 rpm | 9.4s | 190 km/h (118 mph) |
| HS | 2018–present | FWD | 1.5L Turbo I4 | 7-speed DCT | 119 kW (162 PS; 160 hp) at 5,600 rpm | 250 N⋅m (184 lb⋅ft) at 1,700–4,400 rpm | 9.7s | 190 km/h (118 mph) |
| HS | 2018–present | FWD | 2.0L Turbo I4 | 6-speed DCT | 168 kW (228 PS; 225 hp) at 5,300 rpm | 360 N⋅m (266 lb⋅ft) at 2,500–4,000 rpm | 8.1s-8.2s | 210 km/h (130 mph) |
| HS | 2018–present | AWD | 2.0L Turbo I4 | 6-speed DCT | 168 kW (228 PS; 225 hp) at 5,300 rpm | 360 N⋅m (266 lb⋅ft) at 2,500–4,000 rpm | 8.6-8.8s | 210 km/h (130 mph) |

=== Markets ===
==== Asia ====
===== Indonesia =====
The HS was the second MG Motors product in Indonesia to debut in Indonesia on 13 August 2020, with two trim levels available at launch: Excite and Ignite. The Indonesian-spec HS is imported from Thailand, it is offered with a 1.5-litre FFV turbocharged petrol engine paired to a DCT for all variants. The Magnify i-SMART trim was added in June 2021.

The facelifted HS debuted in Indonesia on 25 January 2023 with trim levels and powertrain options remain unchanged from the pre-facelift model.

===== Malaysia =====
The MG HS went on sale in Malaysia on 22 November 2024, with two variants: Standard and Lux; it is powered by a 1.5-litre FFV turbocharged petrol engine paired to a DCT.

===== Pakistan =====
MG HS was launched in late 2020, with two variants and two powertrain options: a 1.5-litre LFV turbocharged petrol and a 1.5-litre turbocharged petrol plug-in hybrid. Later in 2023, MG Pakistan started manufacturing Essence variant with powertrain option:1.5-litre LFV turbocharged petrol locally in Pakistan. It is claimed the best crossover SUV in its league in Pakistan. On the 2 May 2024, another variant was launched that came with the powertrain 2.0 litre turbocharged AWD. Taking the total number of launched variants according to powertrain to three: FWD (1.5T, PHEV) and AWD (2.0T).

===== Philippines =====
The MG HS was launched in the Philippines on 17 March 2022, with two trim levels available: Alpha and Trophy; it is powered by a 1.5-litre FFV turbocharged petrol paired to a DCT.

===== Singapore =====
The HS was introduced alongside the ZS EV in Singapore on 9 January 2020 at the 2020 Singapore Motor Show, as part of MG Motors return in Singapore. It is available solely in the Exclusive trim, it is powered by a 1.5-litre LFV turbocharged petrol engine. The PHEV option was made available in Singapore in December 2021.

===== Taiwan =====
The MG HS was launched in Taiwan on 28 July 2022, with two variants and two powertrain options: a 1.5-litre LFV turbocharged petrol and a 1.5-litre turbocharged petrol plug-in hybrid.

===== Thailand =====
The HS was launched in Thailand on 25 September 2019, with three trim levels available: C, D and X, all variants are powered by a 1.5-litre FFV turbocharged petrol engine paired to a DCT. All HS variants are locally assembled in Thailand. The PHEV option was made available in Thailand in October 2020.

The facelifted HS debuted in Thailand on 21 March 2022 with trim levels and powertrain options remain unchanged from the pre-facelift model.

===== Vietnam =====
The HS was launched in Vietnam on 17 July 2020, imported from China, with two trim levels available: Sport and Trophy. Two powertrains are available: a 1.5-litre LFV turbocharged petrol (front wheel drive) and a 2.0-litre turbocharged petrol (all wheel drive).

The facelifted HS debuted in Vietnam on 28 January 2024 and marked return of the HS in the country after 16 months off sale. Unlike the pre-facelift model, the facelifted HS is imported from Thailand instead of China. It was available in two trim levels: DEL and LUX; it is powered by a 1.5-litre FFV turbocharged petrol engine.

==== Australia ====
The HS was introduced in Australia in November 2019, imported from China, with two trim levels available at launch: Vibe and Excite, both variants are powered by a 1.5-litre LFV turbocharged petrol engine. The entry-level Core and flagship Essence trim levels were later added to the range. In July 2020, a special edition Essence Anfield was introduced to celebrate Liverpool F.C winning the 2019–20 Premier League season. Exterior changes are minimal, while the interior has a black and red coloured dashboard and leather upholstery. In March 2021, two new powertrains were added to the range: a 1.5-litre PHEV petrol plug-in hybrid and a 2.0-litre turbocharged petrol (with standard all-wheel drive). In August 2022, the entry-level Core trim was discontinued. In July 2023, the Excite X and Essence Anfield trim levels were both discontinued.

==== Europe ====
The HS made its European debut starting in the UK in October 2019. In Europe, it is available with either 1.5-litre LFV turbocharged petrol and a 1.5-litre PHEV petrol plug-in hybrid powertrains.

==== Mexico ====
The HS was introduced alongside the ZS and MG 5 in Mexico on 21 October 2020, marking the return of MG Motors in Mexico after 15 years. The HS is available in Excite and Trophy trim levels, it is powered by a 1.5-litre LFV turbocharged petrol paired to a DCT.

The facelifted HS debuted in Mexico on 22 April 2023, which saw the introduction of the 1.5-litre PHEV petrol plug-in hybrid in the country.

==== Middle East ====
The MG HS was launched in the GCC markets in 2020. It is powered by a 2.0-litre turbocharged engine and is offered in two trim levels COM and LUX.

The facelifted HS was launched in GCC markets in June 2023, with the 1.5-litre PHEV petrol plug-in hybrid option was added in the region.

== Second generation (AS33; 2024) ==
Second generation
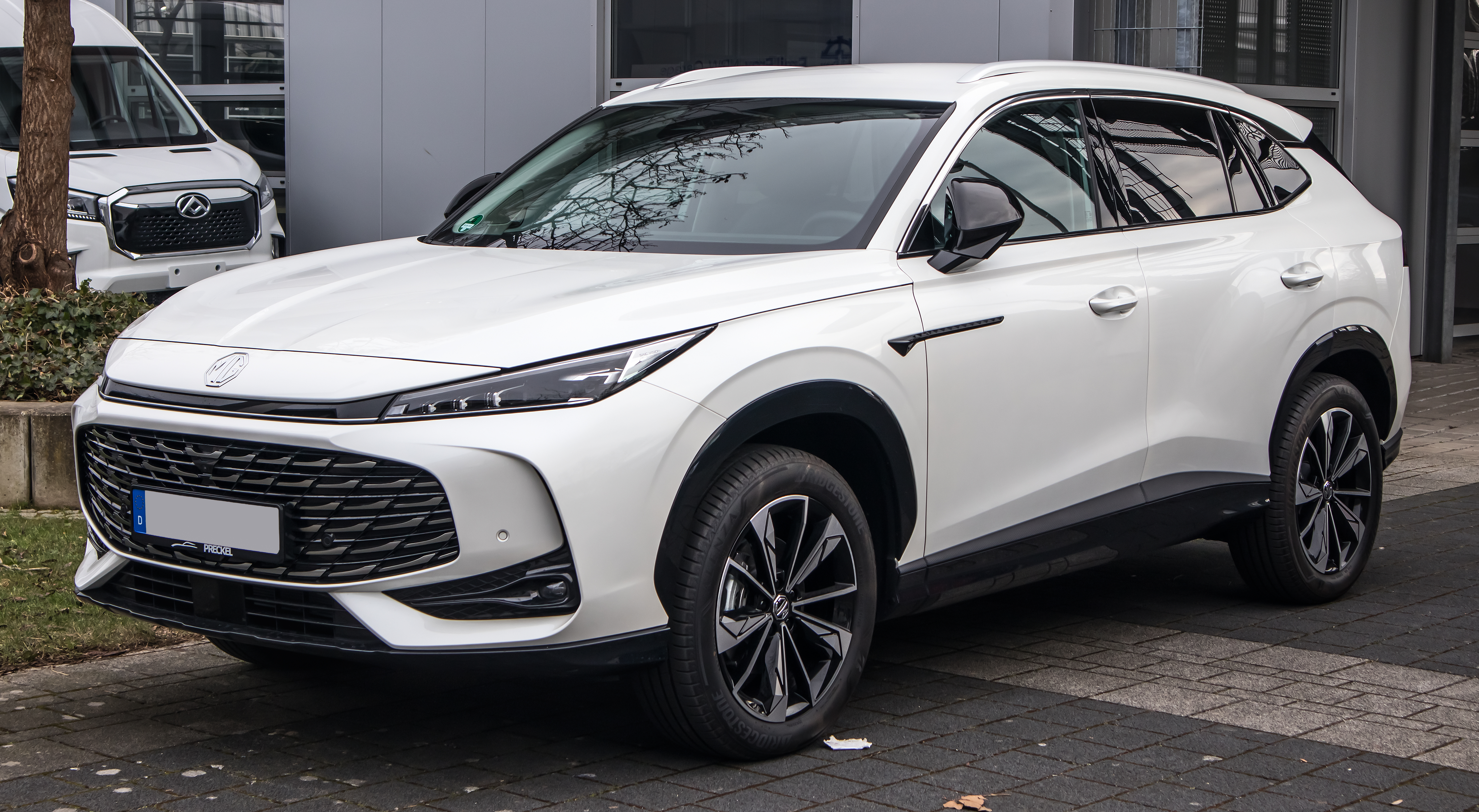
- 2025 MG HS Luxury

Overview
- Model code: AS33
- Also called: MG EHS (Europe, PHEV); Roewe RX5 (China, 2022–2026); Roewe D5X (China, Hybrid, 2024–present); Moskvich M70 (Russia)
- Production: 2024–present
- Assembly: China: Ningde, Fujian; Russia: Moscow (Moskvitch)

Powertrain
- Engine: Petrol: 1.5 L GS61H turbo I4; 2.0 L turbo I4; Petrol hybrid: 1.5 L GS61H turbo I4; Petrol plug-in hybrid: 1.5 L GS61H turbo I4
- Electric motor: Permanent magnet synchronous motor (Hybrid+ and PHEV/Super Hybrid)
- Transmission: 6-speed manual; 9-speed automatic; 7-speed DCT; 2-speed DHT (Hybrid+ and PHEV/Super Hybrid)
- Hybrid drivetrain: Power-split (Hybrid+); Plug-in hybrid (PHEV/Super Hybrid)
- Battery: 1.83 kWh (Hybrid+); 24.7 kWh lithium-ion (PHEV/Super Hybrid)
- Electric range: 64 mi (103 km) (PHEV)

Dimensions
- Wheelbase: 2,765 mm (108.9 in)
- Length: 4,655 mm (183.3 in)
- Width: 1,890 mm (74.4 in)
- Height: 1,664 mm (65.5 in)

The second generation HS was unveiled on 11 July 2024 at the Goodwood Festival of Speed. The second generation MG HS was based heavily on the third generation Roewe RX5. The petrol-powered and plug-in hybrid (PHEV) versions were launched at first and joined with a hybrid variant in 2025. The PHEV version has an estimated electric range of 113 km (70 mi).

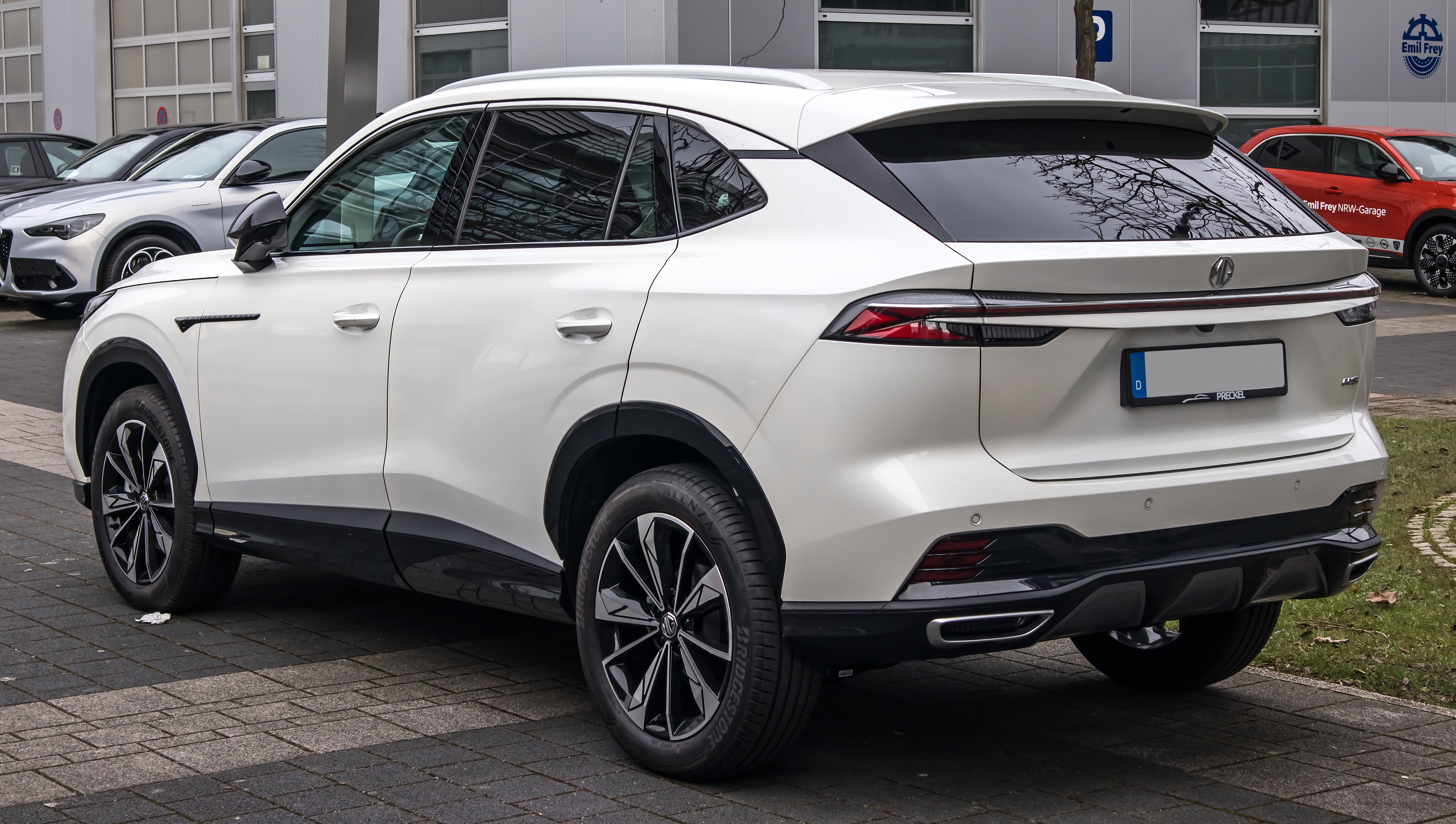
Rear view

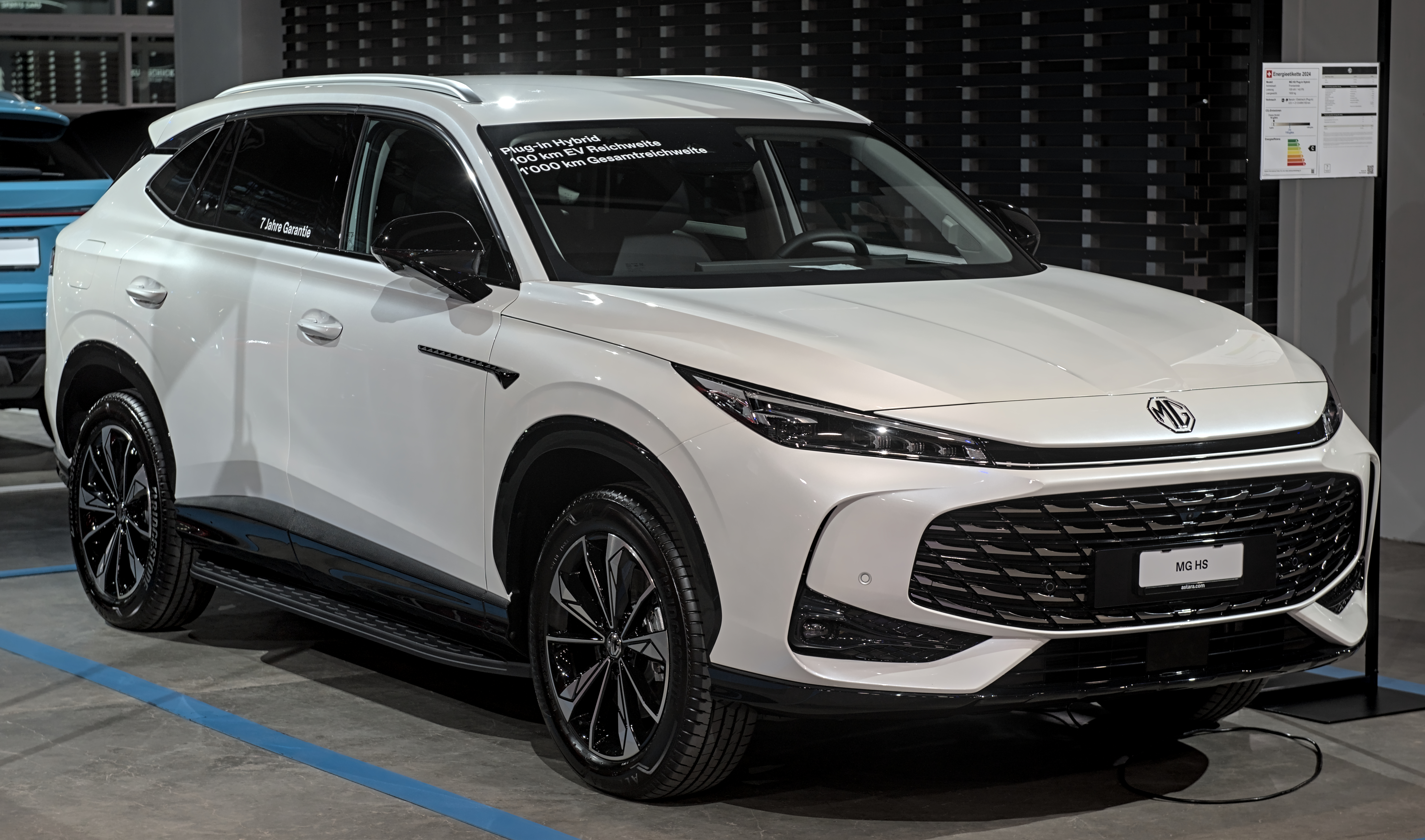
2025 MG EHS

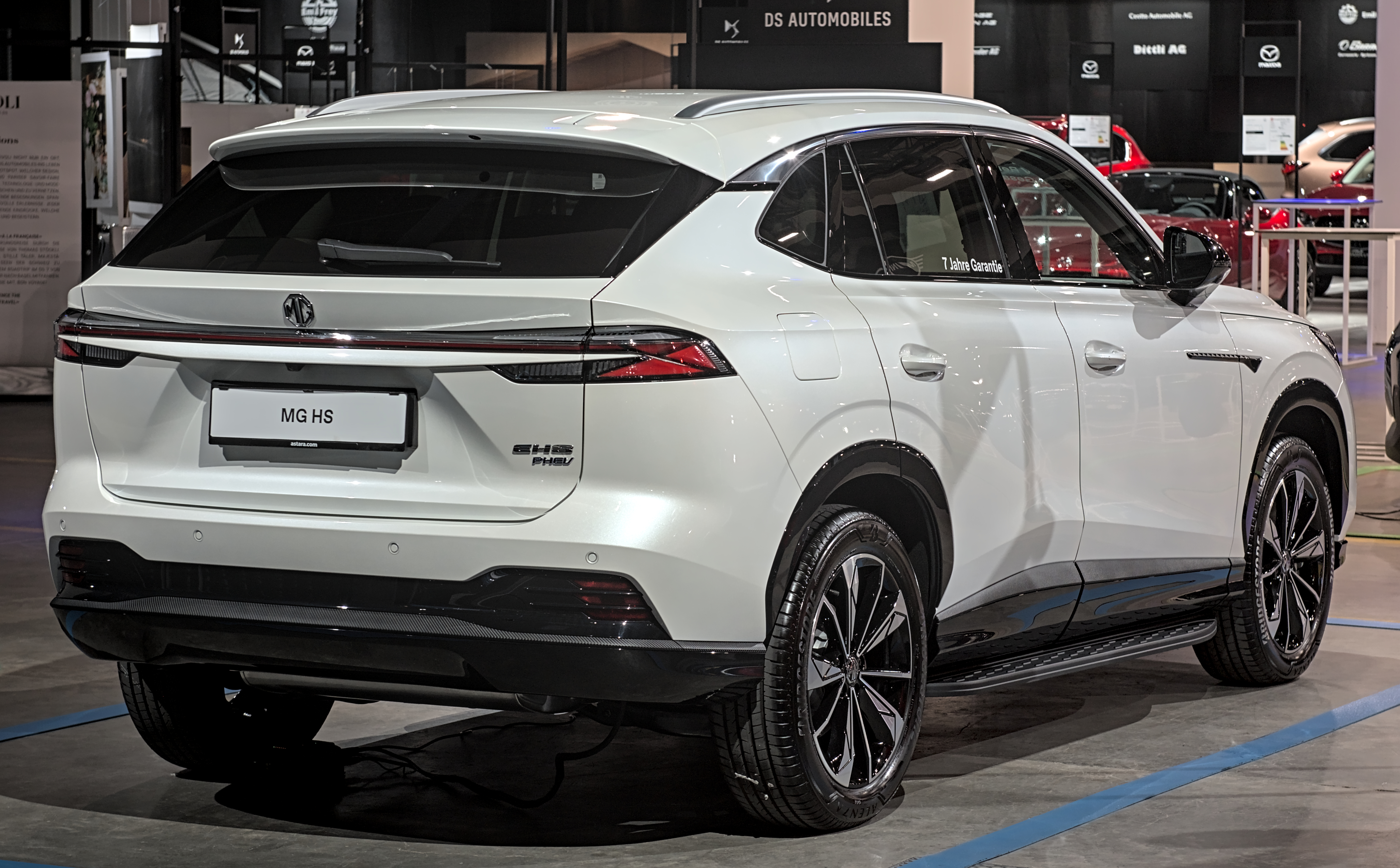
Rear view (EHS)

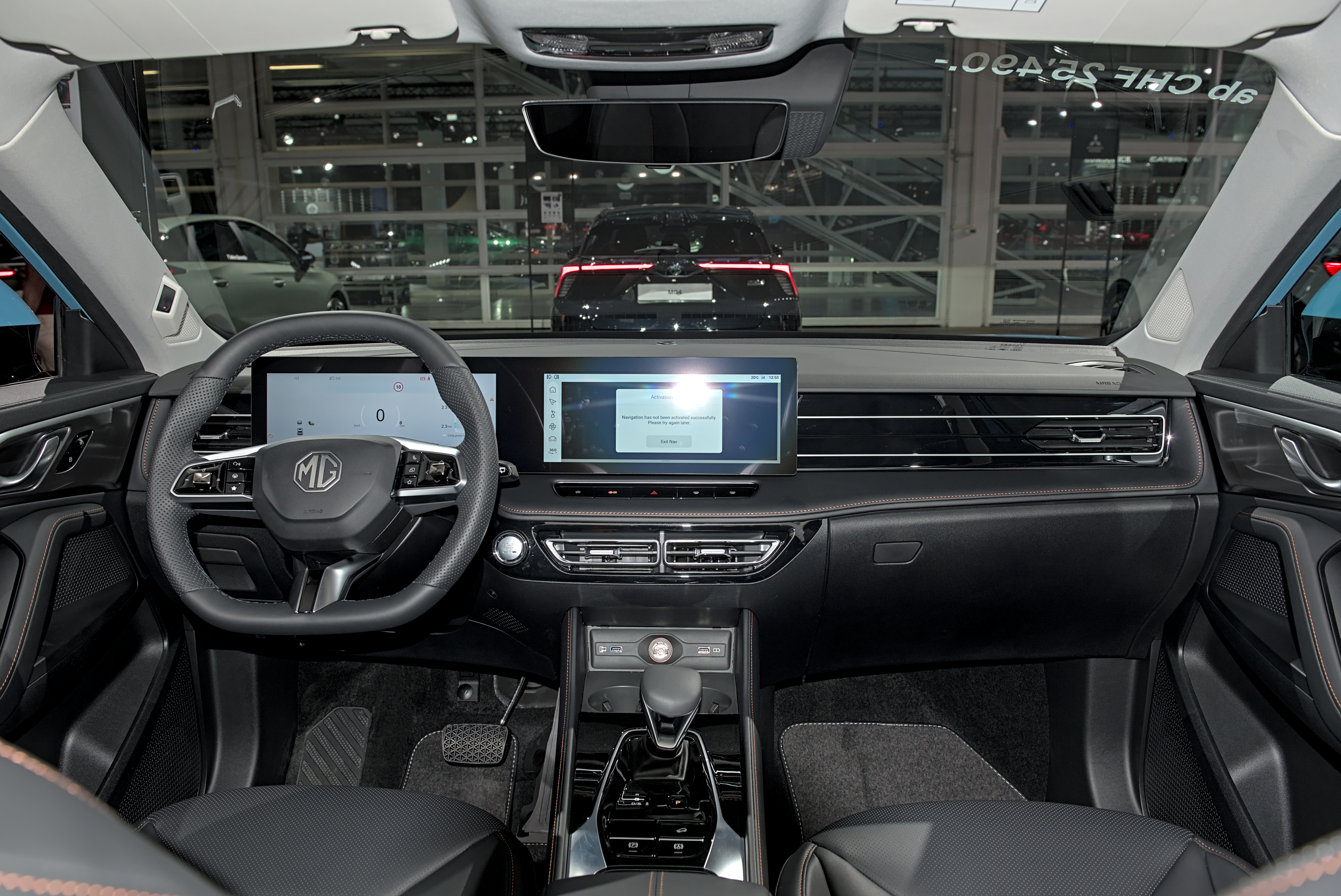
Interior

=== Markets ===
==== Argentina ====
The second-generation HS was launched in Argentina on 7 October 2026, in the sole Hybrid+ variant.

==== Australia ====
The second-generation HS was launched in Australia on 3 September 2024 with three trim levels: Vibe, Excite and Essence. At launch, all variants are powered by a 1.5-litre turbocharged petrol engine.

In June 2025, the 1.5-litre Super Hybrid turbocharged petrol plug-in hybrid option went on sale in Australia for the Excite and Essence trims.

In July 2025, the 1.5-litre Hybrid+ turbocharged petrol hybrid option went on sale in Australia for the Excite and Essence trims.

==== Brunei ====
The second-generation HS was launched in Brunei on 13 February 2026 with two trim levels: Excite and Essence, all variants are powered by a 1.5-litre turbocharged petrol engine. The PHEV variant powered by the 1.5-litre turbocharged petrol plug-in hybrid was introduced on 26 September 2026.

==== Europe ====
In the UK, the second-generation HS is available in four trims: SE, Trophy, SE PHEV and Trophy PHEV.

==== Mexico ====
The second-generation HS was launched in Mexico on 22 August 2025, with three trim levels: Excite, Trophy and Premier. For powertrains, the 1.5-litre turbocharged petrol engine for the Excite trim, the 2.0-litre turbocharged petrol engine for the Trophy trim, and the 1.5-litre Hybrid+ turbocharged petrol hybrid for the Excite and Premier trims.

==== Middle East ====
The second-generation HS was launched in the Middle East, including the GCC countries, Iraq and Jordan on 7 January 2025. It is powered by the 1.5-litre and 2.0-litre turbocharged petrol engine. The trim levels offered are; the 1.5-litre are STD and DEL paired with 7-speed DCT transmission and the 2.0-litre are DEL and LUX paired with 9-speed automatic transmission.

==== Philippines ====
The second-generation HS was launched in the Philippines on 21 November 2025, in the sole Hybrid+ variant powered by the 1.5-litre turbocharged petrol hybrid. In June 2026, the PHEV model powered by the 1.5-litre turbocharged petrol plug-in hybrid was introduced in the line-up.

==== Russia ====
The model is sold in Russia as Moskvich M70.

==== Singapore ====
The second-generation HS was launched in Singapore on 11 January 2025, in the sole Exclusive variant, powered by the 1.5-litre turbocharged petrol engine.

==== South Africa ====
The second-generation HS was launched in South Africa on 17 December 2024, marking the return of the MG marque to the South African market after 8 years. At launch, two trim levels are available: Comfort and Luxury. Engine options includes a 1.5-litre turbocharged petrol engine paired to a 7-speed DCT and a 2.0-litre turbocharged petrol engine paired to a 9-speed automatic.

=== Powertrains ===
| Model | Years | Layout | Engine | Transmission | Power | Torque | Combined system output (hp; Nm) | 0–100 km/h (0–62 mph) (Official) | Top speed |
|---|---|---|---|---|---|---|---|---|---|
| HS | 2024–present | FWD | 1.5L SAIC GS61H 15FDE Turbo I4 | 6-speed manual | 125 kW (170 PS; 168 hp) at 5,000 rpm | 275 N⋅m (203 lb⋅ft) at 3,000–4,000 rpm | - | 9.4 s | 190 km/h (118 mph) |
| HS | 2024–present | FWD | 1.5L SAIC GS61H 15FDE Turbo I4 | 7-speed DCT | 125 kW (170 PS; 168 hp) at 5,000 rpm | 275 N⋅m (203 lb⋅ft) at 3,000–4,000 rpm | - | 9.6 s | 195 km/h (121 mph) |
| HS | 2025–present | FWD | 1.5L SAIC GS61H 15FKE Turbo I4 + 1.8 kWh lithium-ion battery (Hybrid+) | 2-speed DHT | 105 kW (143 PS; 141 hp) at 5,000 rpm Motor: 146 kW (199 PS; 196 hp) | 230 N⋅m (170 lb⋅ft) at 4,000 rpm Motor: 340 N⋅m (251 lb⋅ft) | 165 kW (224 PS; 221 hp); 340 N⋅m (251 lb⋅ft) | 7.9 s | 190 km/h (118 mph) |
| HS | 2024–present | FWD | 1.5L SAIC GS61H 15FKE Turbo I4 + 24.7 kWh lithium-ion battery (PHEV/Super Hybrid) | 2-speed DHT | 105 kW (143 PS; 141 hp) Motor: 154 kW (209 PS; 207 hp) | 230 N⋅m (170 lb⋅ft) Motor: 340 N⋅m (251 lb⋅ft) | 249 kW (339 PS; 334 hp); 432 N⋅m (319 lb⋅ft) | 6.8 s | 164 km/h (102 mph) |
| HS | 2024–present | FWD | 2.0L Turbo I4 | 9-speed automatic | 170 kW (231 PS; 228 hp) | 370 N⋅m (273 lb⋅ft) | - | - | 220 km/h (137 mph) |

=== Safety ===
ANCAP test results MG HS all variants (2024, aligned with Euro NCAP)
| Test | Points | % |
|---|---|---|
| Overall: | 5 /5 stars | |
| Adult occupant: | 36.01 | 90% |
| Child occupant: | 42.81 | 87% |
| Pedestrian: | 52.72 | 83% |
| Safety assist: | 13.50 | 74% |

Euro NCAP test results MG HS 1.5T (LHD) (2024)
| Test | Points | % |
|---|---|---|
| Overall: | 5 /5 stars | |
| Adult occupant: | 36 | 90% |
| Child occupant: | 42 | 85% |
| Pedestrian: | 52.7 | 83% |
| Safety assist: | 13.3 | 74% |

TNCAP (1.0) test result MG HS 1.5T 'Flagship' (2025, similar to Euro NCAP 2017)
| Test | Points | % |
|---|---|---|
| Overall: | 5/5 stars | |
| Adult occupant: | 34.336 | 90% |
| Child occupant: | 43.718 | 89% |
| Pedestrian: | 31.44 | 74% |
| Safety assist: | 8.589 | 71% |

== Sales ==
| Year | China | Europe | Thailand | Mexico | Australia |
|---|---|---|---|---|---|
| 2018 | 12,810 | | | | |
| 2019 | 43,169 | | 2,003 | | |
| 2020 | 49,628 | 2,893 | 6,008 | 137 | 2,600 |
| 2021 | 70,365 | 16,460 | 4,526 | 1,941 | 6,828 |
| 2022 | 51,321 | 32,993 | 2,606 | 4,866 | 10,948 |
| 2023 | 199 | | 1,373 | 3,616 | 8,126 |
| 2024 | 0 | | 663 | 1,866 | 4,552 |
