= Anthony Williams-Kenny =

British car designer

Anthony (Tony) Williams-Kenny is a British car designer and is the Director of Design at the Chinese car manufacturer Zotye Auto as of June 2022.

== Career ==
Williams-Kenny graduated from Coventry University in 1997 with a degree in Transport Design and in 1998 with a masters in automotive design.

He worked as a designer for Mitsubishi Motors at their German design centre before joining MG Rover in 2000 as a design manager.

Williams-Kenny joined SAIC in 2005 and worked for the UK based SAIC Motor UK. In 2011 he was promoted to global design director in Shanghai and returned to the UK in 2016.

In September 2018, Williams-Kenny moved to another Chinese car manufacturer, Zotye.

=== Notable designs ===
- MG Icon concept
- MG Zero concept
- MG 3
- MG HS
- MG 6
- MG CS concept
- MG GS
- Roewe 550
