= MG GS =

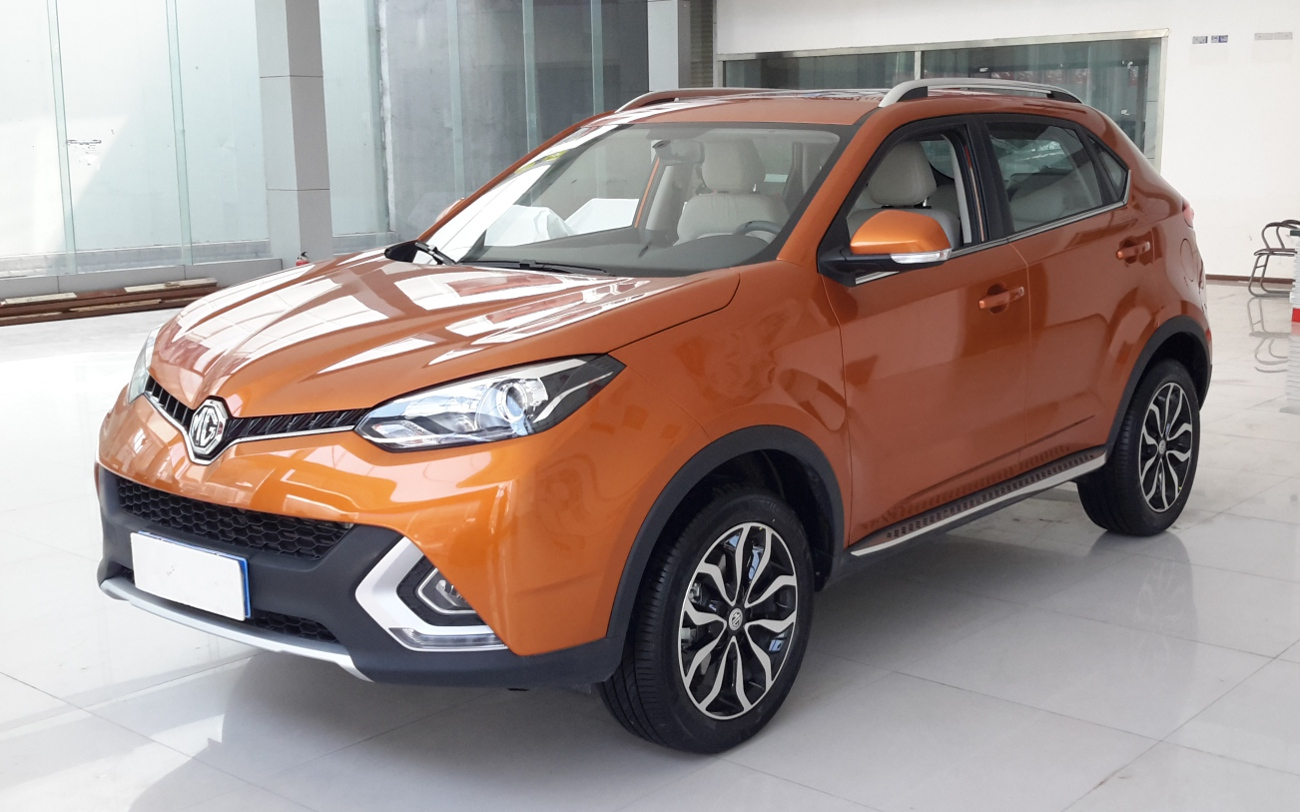

Overview
- Manufacturer: SAIC Motor (MG Motor)
- Model code: AS21
- Production: 2015–2019; 2016–2019 (Thailand)
- Assembly: China: Lingang, Shanghai; Thailand: Laem Chabang (SAIC-CP)
- Designer: Anthony Williams-Kenny

Body and chassis
- Class: Compact crossover SUV
- Body style: 5-door SUV
- Layout: Front-engine, front-wheel-drive four-wheel-drive
- Platform: SAIC Scalable
- Related: Roewe RX5

Powertrain
- Engine: 1.5 L SGE Turbo GDI I4 (petrol); 2.0 L MGE Turbo GDI I4 (petrol)
- Transmission: 6-speed manual 6-speed dual-clutch 7-speed dual-clutch

Dimensions
- Wheelbase: 2,650 mm (104.3 in)
- Length: 4,500 mm (177.2 in)
- Width: 1,855 mm (73.0 in)
- Height: 1,675 mm (65.9 in)

Chronology
- Successor: MG HS

The MG GS (Chinese: 名爵锐腾; pinyin: Míngjué Ruìténg) is the first sports utility vehicle (SUV) to be produced by MG Motor at its plant in China. It was launched at the Auto Shanghai Motor Show in April 2015.

== About ==
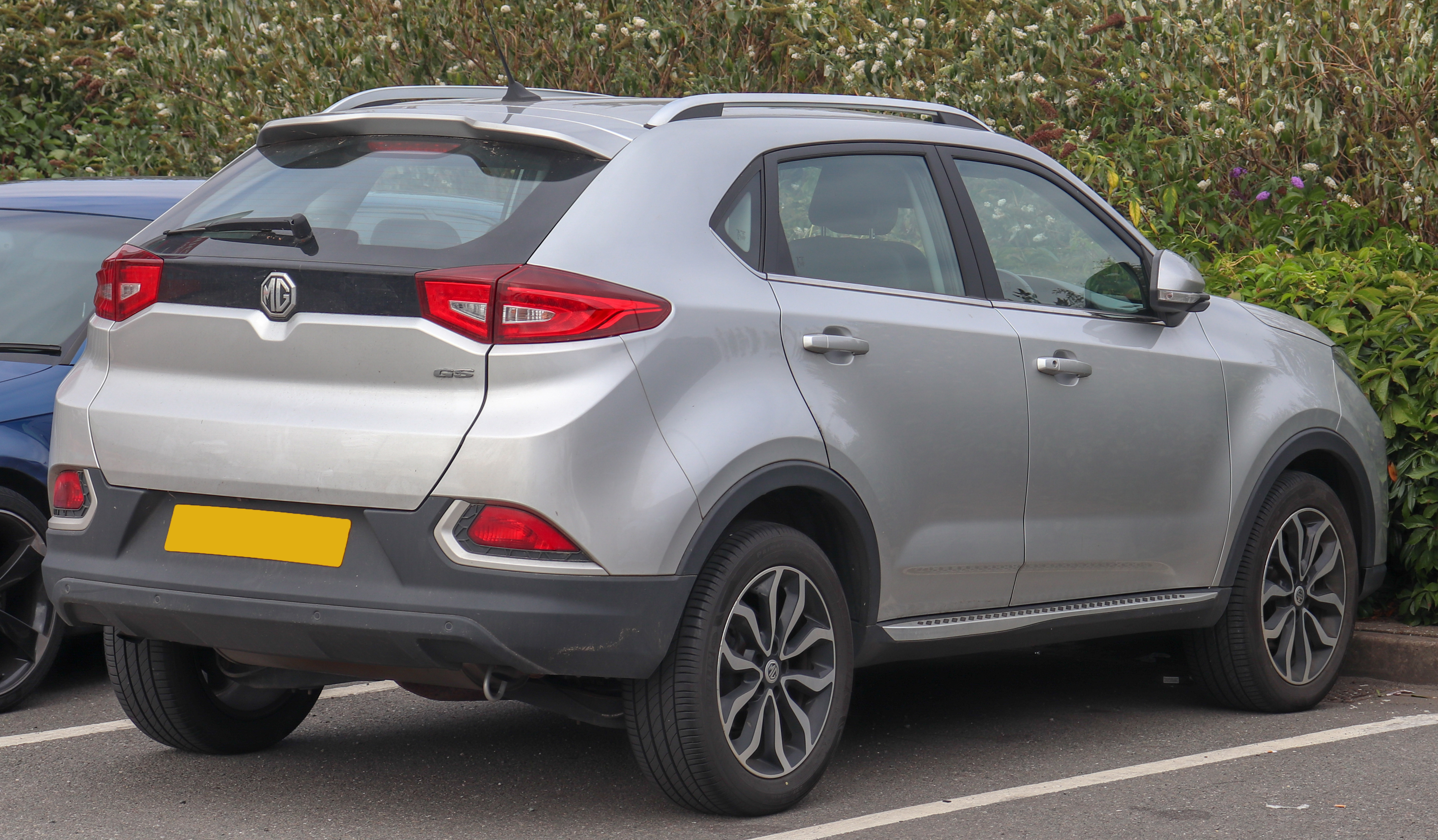
MG GS (rear)

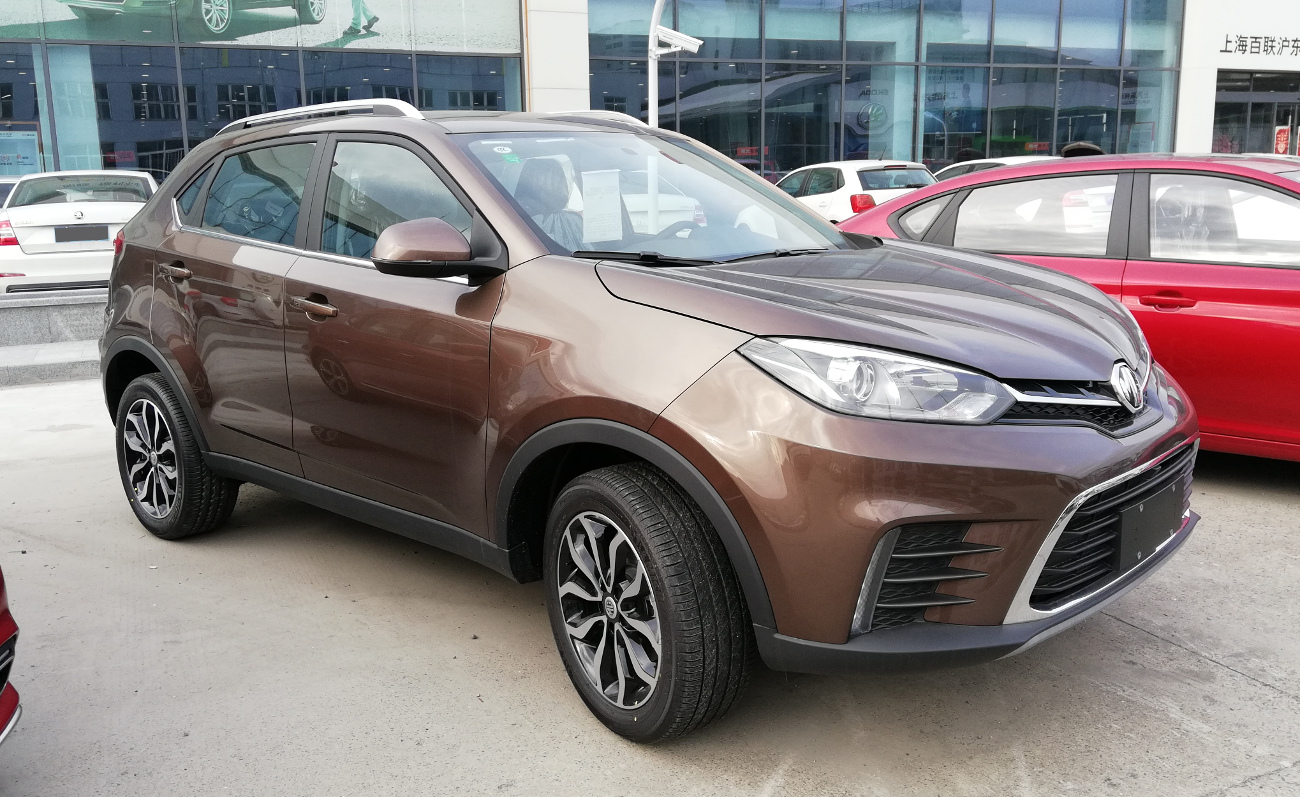
MG GS (facelift)

The GS was launched at the Auto Shanghai Motor Show in April 2015, it closely resembles the MG CS Concept, that was shown at the same show in 2013. The GS design was directed by Anthony Williams-Kenny, in a collaboration between Shanghai and Longbridge development centres.

The GS was launched in the United Kingdom in May 2016, at the London Motor Show, with sales beginning later that year. It is assembled in Lingang, Shanghai, China. A revised GS was launched in 2017 for the Chinese market. The revisions to the new model included a revised exterior styling with main changes to the front and rear bumpers.

In addition to the revisions made to the exterior, changes in specification to the Chinese models were made, such as direct running lights on all models. An updated interior also joined the changes, with improved materials and redesigned air vents similar to the interior of the new MG ZS SUV, to bring it in line with the rest of the range.

== Engines ==
Initial models are powered by two petrol engines. The first is a 1.5 litre turbocharged GDI SAIC CUBE-TEC engine, producing 168 bhp (125 kW; 170 PS), with 184 lb⋅ft (249 N⋅m) of torque. The 1.5 litre CUBE-TEC engine was developed in conjunction with General Motors and is commonly referred to as the GM Small Gasoline Engine (SGE).

Also available is a 2.0 litre turbocharged GDI four cylinder petrol engine developing 217 bhp (162 kW; 220 PS) and 258 lb⋅ft (350 N⋅m). The engine was developed in conjunction with German car manufacturer Opel. The 2.0L Engine is not available in the United Kingdom, but is available in other markets.

Engines
Model	Engine	Displacement	Power	Torque	Top Speed	0–100 km/h (0–62 mph)	CO_{2} emissions
1.5L SGE 15E4E	I4	1,495 cc	170 PS (125 kW; 168 hp) at 5,600 rpm	250 N⋅m (184 lb⋅ft) at 4,500 rpm	190 km/h (118 mph) (Limited)	11.0s	_ g/km
2.0L MGE 20L4E	I4	1,995 cc	220 PS (162 kW; 217 hp) at 5,300 rpm	350 N⋅m (258 lb⋅ft) at 4,500 rpm	208 km/h (129 mph) (Limited)	8.0s	_ g/km

== Chassis ==
The MG GS utilises a new scalable SUV platform developed with parent company SAIC Motor. The Roewe RX5 also makes use of this new scale able platform, and other SAIC products are expected to follow on the platform. The GS has a wheelbase of 2,650 mm (104.3 in) and an overall length of 4,500 mm (177.2 in). The GS comes in two derivatives, a front-wheel drive and an all-wheel drive set up.

All wheel drive is not offered in the United Kingdom, but is available in other markets such as China and Thailand.

== CS Concept ==
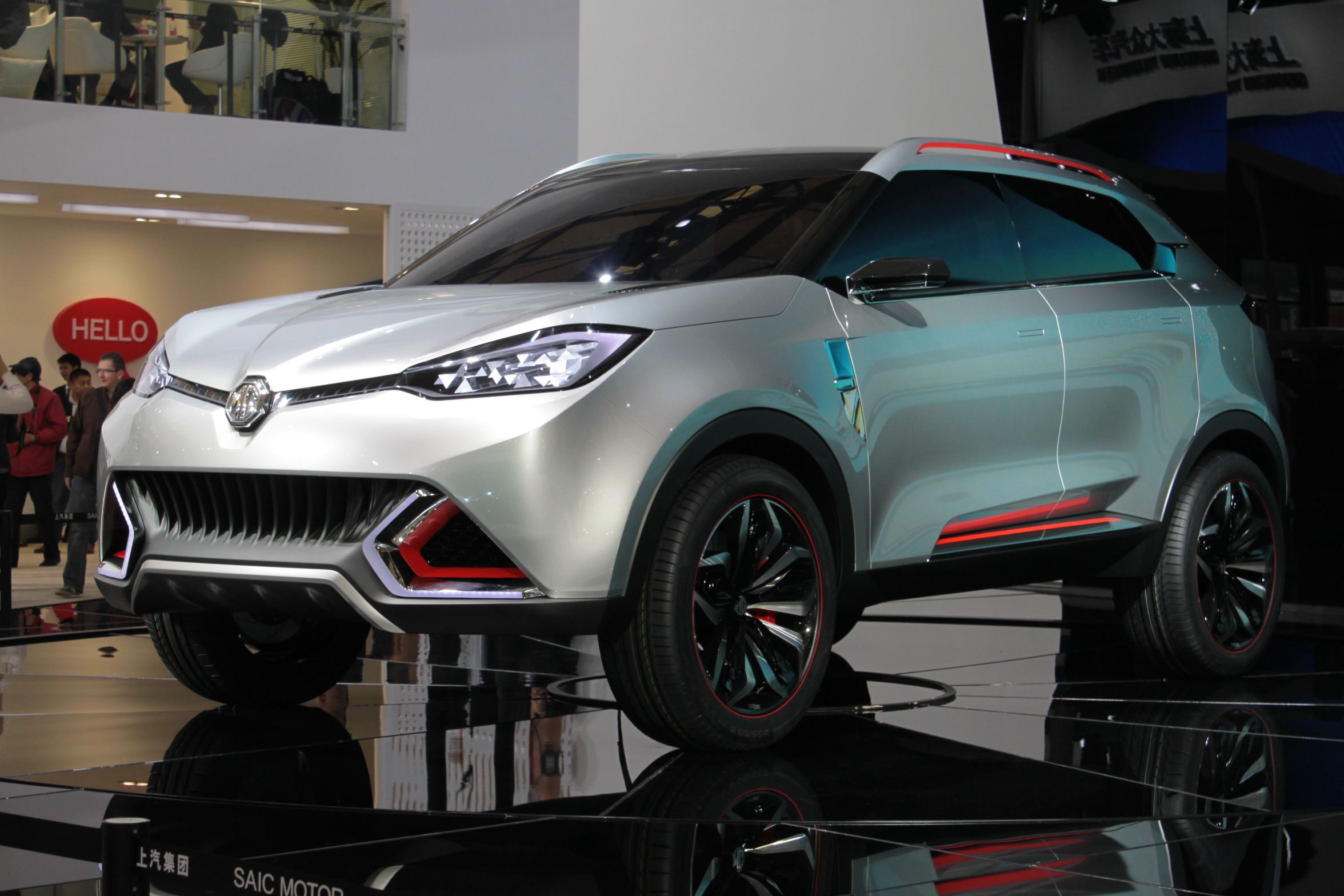
MG CS (2013)

The MG CS Concept was unveiled at the 2013 Shanghai Motor Show. The concept car is designed to slot into the compact SUV sector, one of the fastest growing areas of the global automotive market, where style and sports utility dominate fashion trends.

The CS concept is the result of a large investment into the brand by MG’s owner, SAIC. The CS previewed MG’s first production SUV, the GS. The CS was designed by a design team led by MG’s Global Design Director, Anthony Williams-Kenny between the Longbridge and Shanghai design studios.

The MG CS headlights boast a ‘shard’ structure, which refracts light into indistinguishable colors and shapes that coalesce into MG’s trademark octagon when viewed from the front.

A strong horizontal emphasis gives the side profile of the MG CS a distinctive style and appearance. The MG CS was designed to expand the global reach of the MG brand.

== iGS ==
The MG iGS is a "smart driving" concept car developed by SAIC (Shanghai Auto) and premiered at the 2015 Shanghai Motor Show. It is based on the MG GS compact SUV. The "i" the name of the concept stands for "Information," "Internet," "Innovation," and "Intelligent." According to SAIC, the iGS can accomplish a set of tasks without a driver when traveling between 60–120 km/h: cruising, following and overtaking other cars, lane keeping and changing.

Remote and self parking are also said to be among the smart features. The MG GS IGS was independently developed by SAIC Motor and applied automatic control, artificial intelligence and visual computation. It frees the driver completely from the traditional people vehicle road closed loop, and has used a series of cutting edge technologies.

== Sales ==
Calendar Year	Thailand
2016	471
2017	2,328
2018	2,038
2019	1,037

== Safety ==
ANCAP test results MG GS all variants (2016)
Test	Score
Overall	5 /5 stars
Frontal offset	13.47/16
Side impact	16/16
Pole	Not Assessed
Seat belt reminders	2/3
Whiplash protection	Good
Pedestrian protection	Marginal
Electronic stability control	Standard

ANCAP test results MG GS all variants (2017)
Test	Score
Overall	5 /5 stars
Frontal offset	13.47/16
Side impact	16/16
Pole	2/2
Seat belt reminders	3/3
Whiplash protection	Good
Pedestrian protection	Marginal
Electronic stability control	Standard
