= SG =

SG, Sg or sg may refer to:

== Arts and entertainment ==
=== Music ===
- "SG" (song), a 2021 song by DJ Snake, Ozuna, Lisa, and Megan Thee Stallion
- Gibson SG, an electric guitar manufactured by Gibson Guitar Corporation
- SG Wannabe, a South Korean music group
- Selena Gomez (born 1992), American singer, actress, producer, and businesswoman

=== Other media ===
- Spy Groove, an American animated television series stylized on screen and in promotional materials as SG
- Stargate, a Canadian-American military science fiction media franchise running from 1994, 1997–2011
- SuicideGirls, a softcore pornographic website
- Steins;Gate (S;G), a science fiction visual novel game developed by 5pb. and Nitroplus
- Sabado Gigante, a Spanish-language weekly variety show with Don Francisco airing from 1962-2015

== Businesses and organizations ==
- sweetgreen, an American restaurant chain, ticker symbol SG.
- SG Automotive, a Chinese vehicle and component manufacturer
- SG (cigarette), a Portuguese cigarette brand produced by Tabaqueira, an Altria subsidiary
- Sempati Air (IATA airline code SG, from 1968 to 1998)
- Jetsgo (IATA airline code SG, from 2001 to 2005)
- Saint Gabriel's College, Bangkok, a private school in Bangkok, Thailand
- Scots Guards, a British Army Regiment
- Société Générale, a French financial services multinational
- Special Group (India), a confidential special forces unit of India
- SpiceJet, Indian low-cost airline (IATA code: SG)
- Straż Graniczna, a Polish border guard formation
- System Group, an Iranian software development company

== Places ==
- Singapore (ISO 3166-1 country code SG)
- Canton of St. Gallen, a canton in Switzerland

== Science and technology ==
- .sg, the top-level domain of Singapore
- Seaborgium, symbol Sg, a chemical element
- SG-1000, a video game console made by Sega
- SG-43 Goryunov, Stankovyi Goryunova Model 1943, a Soviet medium machine gun
- Specific gravity (symbol SG), another name for Relative density: the weight of a volume of fluid or solution as compared to the weight of the same volume of water
- Standard gamble, a direct method to measure the QALY weight
- Stress granule

== Sport ==
- Shooting guard, a basketball position
- Sanspareils Greenlands, a cricket equipment manufacturer

== Other uses ==
- Sango language of Central Africa (ISO 639-1 code sg)
- Secretary General
- Shotgun, often in the context of buckshot size
- Star of Gallantry, an Australian gallantry decoration
- St. Gall Priscian Glosses, a set of Old Irish and Latin glosses
