= GM small gasoline engine =

Family of small-displacement engines designed by GM

Small Gasoline Engine
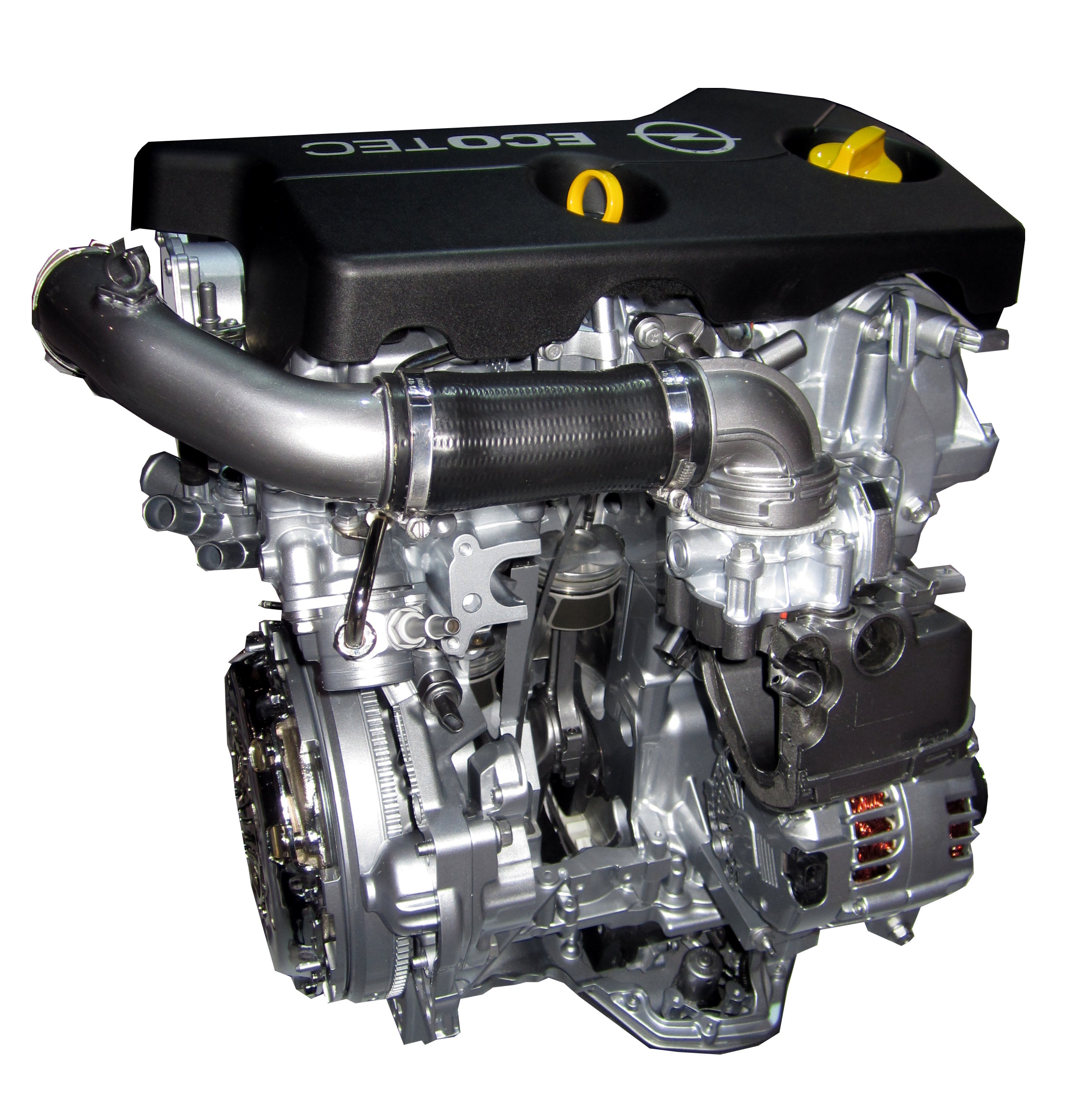

Overview
- Manufacturer: General Motors; SAIC Motor
- Also called: Microtec
- Production: 2013–present

Layout
- Configuration: Straight-3; Straight-4
- Displacement: 999 cc (1.0 L; 61.0 cu in); 1,117 cc (1.1 L; 68.2 cu in); 1,399 cc (1.4 L; 85.4 cu in); 1,490 cc (1.5 L; 90.9 cu in)
- Cylinder bore: 74 mm (2.91 in)
- Piston stroke: 77.4 mm (3.05 in); 77.7 mm (3.06 in); 81.3 mm (3.20 in); 86.6 mm (3.41 in)
- Cylinder block material: Aluminium
- Cylinder head material: Aluminium
- Valvetrain: DOHC 4 valves × cyl.
- Valvetrain drive system: Chain
- Compression ratio: 10.0:1 – 12.5:1

RPM range
- Max. engine speed: 6500

Combustion
- Turbocharger: Mitsubishi Heavy Industries one-stage single-scroll (some versions)
- Fuel system: Sequential multi-port FI; Direct injection
- Fuel type: CNG; E85; E100; Gasoline; LPG
- Oil system: Wet sump
- Cooling system: Water cooled

Output
- Power output: 55–130 kW (74–175 hp; 75–177 PS)
- Torque output: 95–275 N⋅m (70–203 lb⋅ft)

Dimensions
- Dry weight: 98 kg (216 lb)

Chronology
- Predecessor: S-TEC; Family 0
- Successor: GM E-Turbo engine (1.4 Version); GM CSS Prime engine

The GM Small Gasoline Engine (SGE) is a family of small-displacement, inline three- and four-cylinder gasoline engines ranging from 1.0 L to 1.5 L, developed by Opel Automobile GmbH, Shanghai Automotive Industry Corporation (SAIC), MG Motor (MG), Shanghai GM (SGM), and the Pan-Asia Technical Automotive Center (PATAC).

The new global family is designed to improve fuel economy, performance, and emissions, while reducing noise and vibrations. To achieve this, it features a lightweight design and advanced technologies like gasoline direct injection, turbocharging, variable-length intake manifolds, and alternative fuel compatibility. It uses a modular approach with interchangeable components that can be suited to specific applications.

The SGE has been available in the following displacements:

- 999 cc (1.0 L; 61.0 cu in) I3 DI DCVCP turbo 77.4 mm (3.05 in) stroke,
- 1,118 cc (1.1 L; 68.2 cu in) I3 PFI 86.6 mm (3.41 in) stroke,
- 1,399 cc (1.4 L; 85.4 cu in) I4 DI DCVCP turbo 81.3 mm (3.20 in) stroke, and
- 1,490 cc (1.5 L; 90.9 cu in) I4 PFI 86.6 mm (3.41 in) stroke

All engines share a common block design (depending on the number of cylinders) and a 74 mm (2.91 in) bore with 81 mm (3.19 in) bore spacing. The one-stage single-scroll turbocharger in turbocharged variants is supplied by Mitsubishi Heavy Industries.

To reduce noise, vibration, and harshness (NVH) levels, the direct injection fuel rail mounts to the cylinder head and valve cover via bushings that isolate the loud ticking noise that injector pintles make. GM claims that the 1.0-liter turbo is 25 percent (3 dBA) quieter than the Ford Fiesta's 1.0-liter turbo, and the 1.4-liter is up to 50 percent (6 dBA) quieter than the VW/Audi 1.4-liter turbo. Other silencing measures include a bed-plate cylinder block that increases stiffness and a stiffened aluminum front cam cover. Three-cylinder variants get a balance shaft that is integrated with the oil pump and located inside the two-piece aluminum oil pan to prevent radiated noise. The shaft counter-rotates at engine speed. GM claims that the EcoTec three-cylinder idles more smoothly than Ford's three-cylinder, which does not use a shaft.

All turbocharged variants provide 90 percent of their maximum torque between 1500 and 5000 rpm, with peak power arriving between 5600 and 6000 rpm. The MHI turbochargers are sized to provide quick torque response, and are mounted very close to the cylinders, thanks to cylinder heads that incorporate the exhaust manifolds in the head.

To reduce mass, the engines are compact in all directions, made almost entirely of aluminum, and feature composite intake manifolds. This removes 44 pounds (20 kg) from the previous 1.4-liter turbo in the Cruze and makes it 8 pounds (4 kg) lighter than the 1.4-liter VW turbo. GM says this engine weighs 216 pounds (98 kg), ready for installation.

The engines debuted in the 2014 Opel Adam and were first produced in Szentgotthárd, Hungary. They have also been produced in Changwon, South Korea; Toluca, Mexico; Spring Hill, Tennessee; Flint, Michigan; and Shanghai, China. By 2018, the new engine family had spread to other brands and markets, replacing three separate engine families (S-TEC, Family 0, and Family 1).

The assembly lines for North American facilities were manufactured by Hirata Corporation at its powertrain facility in Kumamoto, Japan.

== Non-Opel Variants ==
=== 1.4 ===
==== LV7 ====
The LV7 is the multi-point fuel injection 1.4 L naturally-aspirated variant of the SGE, with a 74 mm × 81.3 mm (2.91 in × 3.20 in) bore and stroke for a total capacity of 1,399 cc (1.4 L). Compression ratio is 10.6:1 and the engine can run on regular unleaded grade gasoline. Assembly is in Changwon, South Korea.

Year(s)	Model	Power	Torque
2016–2022	Chevrolet Spark	73 kW (98 hp) at 6200 rpm	128 N⋅m (94 lb⋅ft) at 4400 rpm

==== LE2 ====
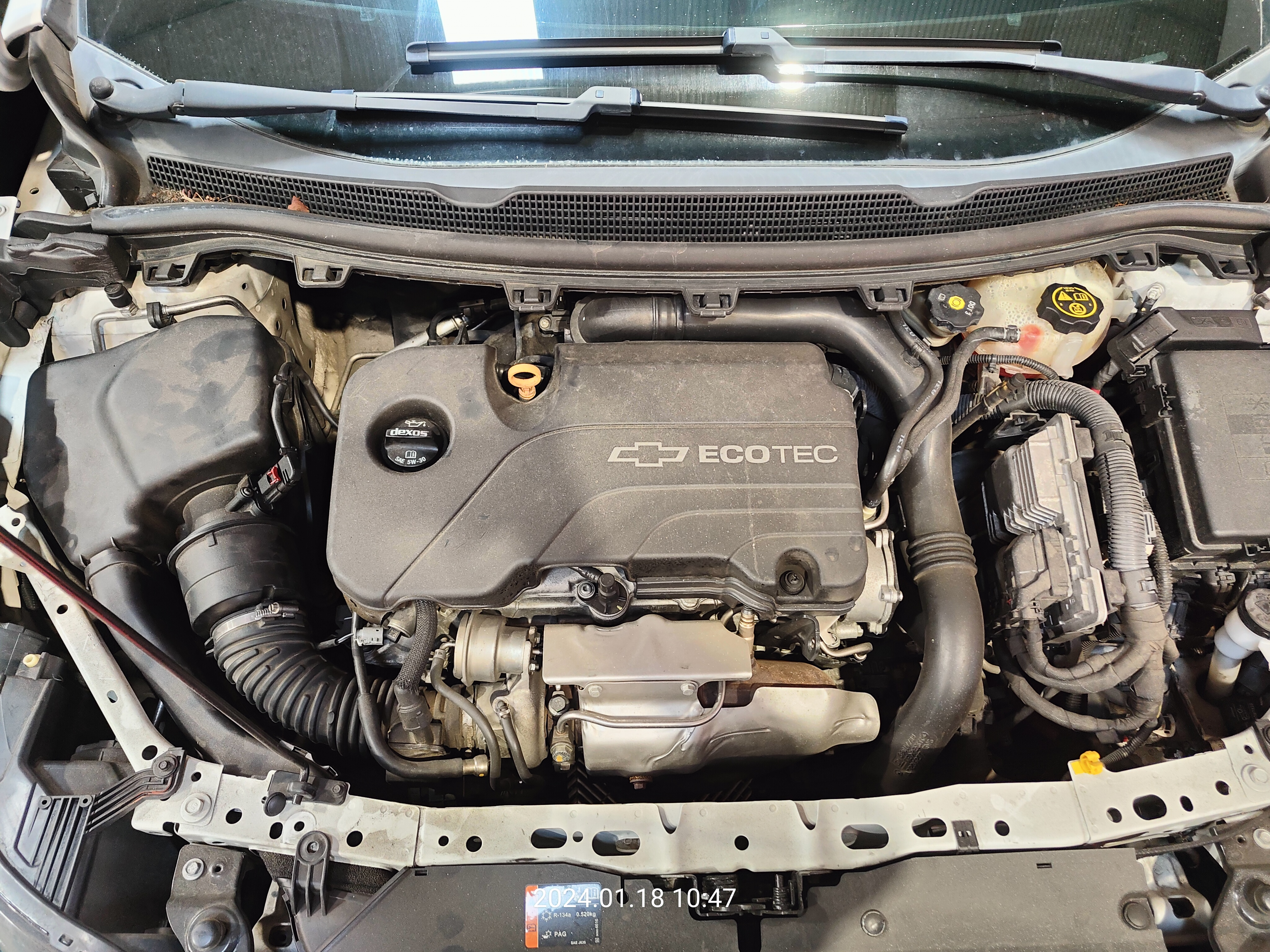
GM LE2 engine in a Chevrolet Cruze

The LE2 is the direct-injection 1.4 L turbocharged variant of the SGE, with a 74 mm × 81.3 mm (2.91 in × 3.20 in) bore and stroke for a total capacity of 1,399 cc (1.4 L). Compression ratio is 10.0:1 and the engine can run on regular grade gasoline. The LE2 is also paired with a start-stop system in some vehicles.

Year(s)	Model	Power	Torque
2016	Buick Encore Sport Touring	114 kW (153 hp) at 5600 rpm	240 N⋅m (177 lb⋅ft) at 2000–4000 rpm
2017–2019	Buick Encore (Optional)	114 kW (153 hp) at 5600 rpm	240 N⋅m (177 lb⋅ft) at 2000–4000 rpm
2016–2019	Chevrolet Cruze	114 kW (153 hp) at 5600 rpm	240 N⋅m (177 lb⋅ft) at 2000–4000 rpm
2021–2022	Buick Encore	116 kW (155 hp) at 5600 rpm	240 N⋅m (177 lb⋅ft) at 2000–4000 rpm
2021–2022	Chevrolet Trax	116 kW (155 hp) at 5600 rpm	240 N⋅m (177 lb⋅ft) at 2000–4000 rpm

=== 1.5 ===
==== L3A ====
The L3A is the direct-injection 1.5 L naturally-aspirated variant of the SGE used in the second-generation Chevrolet Volt, with a 74 mm × 86.6 mm (2.91 in × 3.41 in) bore and stroke for a total capacity of 1,490 cc (1.5 L). The compression ratio is 12.5:1 and the engine can run on regular unleaded-grade gasoline. Maximum engine speed is 6000 rpm.

Year(s)	Model	Power	Torque
2016–2019	Chevrolet Volt	75 kW (100 hp) at 5600 rpm	140 N⋅m (103 lb⋅ft) at 4300 rpm
2017–2019	Buick Velite 5	79 kW (106 hp) at 5800 rpm	138 N⋅m (102 lb⋅ft) at 4400 rpm
2024–	MG 3	80 kW (107 hp) at 6000 rpm	128 N⋅m (94 lb⋅ft) at 4500 rpm
2020–	MG 5	84 kW (112 hp) at 6000 rpm	150 N⋅m (111 lb⋅ft) at 4500 rpm
2024–	MG 3 Hybrid+	143 kW (192 hp) at 6000 rpm	250 N⋅m (184 lb⋅ft) at 4500 rpm

==== LFV ====
The LFV is a direct-injection 1.5 L turbocharged SGE variant, with a 74 mm × 86.6 mm (2.91 in × 3.41 in) bore and stroke for a total capacity of 1,490 cc (1.5 L). Compression ratio is 10.0:1 and the engine can run on regular unleaded-grade gasoline. Maximum engine speed is 6500 rpm. Automatic Start-Stop is available with this engine. Assembly is in Shanghai (China), Changwon (South Korea), Toluca (Mexico), Spring Hill (Tennessee), and Flint (Michigan).

Year(s)	Model	Power	Torque
2016–2025	Chevrolet Malibu	122 kW (163 hp) at 5700 rpm	250 N⋅m (184 lb⋅ft) at 2000–4000 rpm
2016–	Buick LaCrosse	126 kW (169 hp) at 5600 rpm	250 N⋅m (184 lb⋅ft) at 1700–4000 rpm
2016–2021	Buick Envision	126 kW (169 hp) at 5600 rpm	250 N⋅m (184 lb⋅ft) at 1700–4000 rpm
2018–	MG HS	121 kW (162 hp) at 5600 rpm	250 N⋅m (184 lb⋅ft) at 1700–4400 rpm
2020–	MG 5 LE	128 kW (171 hp) at 5600 rpm	275 N⋅m (203 lb⋅ft) at 1750–4000 rpm
2021–	MG 6 PRO	135 kW (181 hp) at 5600 rpm	285 N⋅m (210 lb⋅ft) at 1500–4000 rpm
2022–	MG 5 Scorpio Edition	135 kW (181 hp) at 5600 rpm	285 N⋅m (210 lb⋅ft) at 1500–4000 rpm

==== LYX ====
The LYX is a direct-injection 1.5 L turbocharged SGE variant, with a 74 mm × 86.6 mm (2.91 in × 3.41 in) bore and stroke for a total capacity of 1,490 cc (1.5 L). Compression ratio is 10.0:1 and uses regular unleaded gasoline.

Year(s)	Model	Power	Torque
2018–	MG HS FFV	121 kW (162 hp) at 5600 rpm	250 N⋅m (184 lb⋅ft) at 1700–4400 rpm
2020–	MG HS PHEV	212 kW (284 hp) at 5500 rpm	480 N⋅m (354 lb⋅ft) at 1700–4300 rpm
2018–2022	Chevrolet Equinox	127 kW (170 hp) at 5600 rpm	275 N⋅m (203 lb⋅ft) at 2000–4000 rpm
2018–2022	GMC Terrain	127 kW (170 hp) at 5600 rpm	275 N⋅m (203 lb⋅ft) at 2000–4000 rpm

==== LSD ====
The LSD is a direct-injection 1.5 L turbocharged SGE variant, with a 74 mm × 86.6 mm (2.91 in × 3.41 in) bore and stroke for a total capacity of 1,490 cc (1.5 L). Compression ratio is 10.0:1 and uses regular unleaded gasoline. Horsepower has increased to 175 hp (130 kW) (from 170 hp on the LYX) while torque remains at 203 lb⋅ft (275 N⋅m). Hardware enhancements include a higher-pressure fuel system (35 MPa vs 20 MPa), enhanced piston design with PVD coating, and precise intake phaser positioning which optimize efficiency and contribute to overall performance.

Year(s)	Model	Power	Torque
2023–	Chevrolet Equinox	130 kW (175 hp) at 5600 rpm	275 N⋅m (203 lb⋅ft) at 2000–4000 rpm
2023–	GMC Terrain	130 kW (175 hp) at 5600 rpm	275 N⋅m (203 lb⋅ft) at 2000–4000 rpm

== Opel Variants ==
Variant	# cylinder	Bore x stroke	Displacement	Aspiration	Compression Ratio	Power output	Torque	Applications	Years of production
B10XE	Inline-3	74 mm × 77.7 mm (2.91 in × 3.06 in)	999 cc (1.0 L)	Naturally aspirated Indirect injection	10.5:1	56 kW (75 hp) at 6500 rpm	96 N⋅m (71 lb⋅ft) at 4500 rpm	Opel Karl	from 03/2015
B10XFL	Inline-3	74 mm × 77.4 mm (2.91 in × 3.05 in)	999 cc (1.0 L)	Direct injection turbo	10.5:1	67 kW (90 hp) at 3700–6000 rpm	170 N⋅m (125 lb⋅ft) at 1800–3700 rpm	Opel Adam 1.0 SGE	from 11/2014
B10XFL	Inline-3	74 mm × 77.4 mm (2.91 in × 3.05 in)	999 cc (1.0 L)	Direct injection turbo	10.5:1	67 kW (90 hp) at 3700–6000 rpm	170 N⋅m (125 lb⋅ft) at 1800–3700 rpm	Opel Corsa E 1.0 SGE Turbo	from 11/2014
B10XFL	Inline-3	74 mm × 77.4 mm (2.91 in × 3.05 in)	999 cc (1.0 L)	Direct injection turbo	10.5:1	78 kW (105 hp) at 5000 rpm	170 N⋅m (125 lb⋅ft) at 1800–4250 rpm	Opel Astra K 1.0 Turbo	from 07/2015
B10XFT	Inline-3	74 mm × 77.4 mm (2.91 in × 3.05 in)	999 cc (1.0 L)	Direct injection turbo	10.5:1	86 kW (115 hp) at 5000–6000 rpm	170 N⋅m (125 lb⋅ft) at 1800–4500 rpm	Opel Adam 1.0 SGE	from 11/2014
B10XFT	Inline-3	74 mm × 77.4 mm (2.91 in × 3.05 in)	999 cc (1.0 L)	Direct injection turbo	10.5:1	86 kW (115 hp) at 5000–6000 rpm	170 N⋅m (125 lb⋅ft) at 1800–4500 rpm	Opel Corsa E 1.0 SGE Turbo (115 CV)	from 11/2014
B14XE	Inline-4	74 mm × 81.3 mm (2.91 in × 3.20 in)	1,399 cc (1.4 L)	Naturally aspirated Indirect injection	10.6:1	75 kW (101 hp) at 6000 rpm	130 N⋅m (96 lb⋅ft) at 4000 rpm	Opel Astra K 1.4 16v	from 07/2015
B14XFL	Inline-4	74 mm × 81.3 mm (2.91 in × 3.20 in)	1,399 cc (1.4 L)	Direct injection turbo	10.0:1	93 kW (125 hp) at 4000–5600 rpm	245 N⋅m (181 lb⋅ft) at 2000–3500 rpm	Opel Astra K 1.4 Turbo	from 07/2015
B14XFT	Inline-4	74 mm × 81.3 mm (2.91 in × 3.20 in)	1,399 cc (1.4 L)	Direct injection turbo	10.0:1	112 kW (150 hp) at 5000–5600 rpm	245 N⋅m (181 lb⋅ft) at 2000–3500 rpm	Opel Astra K 1.4 Turbo	from 07/2015
B15XFL	Inline-4	74 mm x 86.6 (2.91 in x 3.41 in)	1490 cc (1.5 L)	Direct injection turbo	10.1:1	103 kW (140 hp) at 5600 rpm	250 N⋅m (184 lb⋅ft) at 2000–4100 rpm	Opel Insignia B 1.5 Turbo	from 06/2017
B15XFT	Inline-4	74 mm x 86.6 (2.91 in x 3.41 in)	1490 cc (1.5 L)	Direct injection turbo	10.1:1	121 kW (165 hp) at 5600 rpm	250 N⋅m (184 lb⋅ft) at 2000–4500 rpm	Opel Insignia B 1.5 Turbo	from 06/2017

== See also ==
- GM Family 0 engine
- GM Family 1 engine
- Daewoo S-TEC engine
- GM Medium Gasoline Engine
- GM Medium Diesel engine
- GM Ecotec engine
- List of GM engines
