= Gryazev-Shipunov =

Gryazev-Shipunov (Russian: Грязев-Шипунов; Russian: ГШ, romanized: GSh) may refer to:

- Gryazev-Shipunov GSh-6-23 (Russian: Грязев-Шипунов ГШ-6-23), a Soviet 23 mm 6-barreled rotary cannon
- Gryazev-Shipunov GSh-6-30 (Russian: Грязев-Шипунов ГШ-6-30), a Soviet 30 mm 6-barreled rotary cannon
- Gryazev-Shipunov GSh-23 (Russian: Грязев-Шипунов ГШ-23), a Soviet twin-barreled 23 mm autocannon
  - Gryazev-Shipunov GSh-23L (Russian: Грязев-Шипунов ГШ-23Л), variant with muzzle brake
- Gryazev-Shipunov GSh-30-1 (Russian: Грязев-Шипунов ГШ-30-1), a Soviet single-barreled 30 mm autocannon
- Gryazev-Shipunov GSh-30-2 (Russian: Грязев-Шипунов ГШ-30-2), a Soviet twin-barreled 30 mm autocannon
- Gryazev-Shipunov GSh-18 (Russian: Грязев-Шипунов ГШ-18), a Soviet 9 mm semi-automatic pistol

== See also ==
- Glagolev-Shipunov-Gryazev GShG-7.62 (Russian: ГШГ-7,62), a Soviet 7.62 mm quad-barreled rotary machine gun
- List of Russian weaponry makers
- List of aircraft weapons
- List of autocannon
