= GSL =

GSL may refer to:

== Companies and organizations ==
- Geological Society of London, a learned society in the United Kingdom
- Ghana School of Law, an educational institution for training lawyers in Ghana
- Goa Shipyard Limited, an Indian shipyard
- Govan Shipbuilders Limited, a British shipbuilding company
- Group Scout Leader, adult leader of a Scout group in the United Kingdom

== Entertainment ==
- Game System License, a trademark license for Dungeons & Dragons
- Global StarCraft II League, an e-Sport tournament
- Gold Standard Laboratories, a record label
- Kamen Rider Kabuto: God Speed Love, 2006 movie based on the Kamen Rider Kabuto series

== Sport ==
- Georgia State League, former American Class D professional baseball league
- Global Super League, cricket tournament
- Guam Soccer League, top division association football league in Guam

== Language ==
- Gambian Sign Language, a national sign language used by the deaf community of Gambia
- Georgian Sign Language, the national sign language of the deaf in the country of Georgia
- German Sign Language, the sign language of the deaf community in Germany
- Ghandruk Sign Language, a village sign language of the village of Ghandruk in central Nepal
- Greek Sign Language, the sign language of the Greek deaf community
- General Service List, a list of basic English words for language learners

== Transport ==
- Taltheilei Narrows Airport (IATA code: GSL), an airport in Northwest Territories, Canada
- Gunnislake railway station (National Rail code: GSL), a station in Cornwall, UK

== Other uses ==
- General sales list, a legal category of drugs in the UK (over-the-counter)
- Glycosphingolipids, a subtype of glycolipids containing the amino alcohol sphingosine
- GNU Scientific Library, a software library for applied mathematics and science
- Great Salt Lake, a salt water lake in Utah

== See also ==
- Gaius Salvius Liberalis
