= Roewe RX5 =

Compact crossover SUV

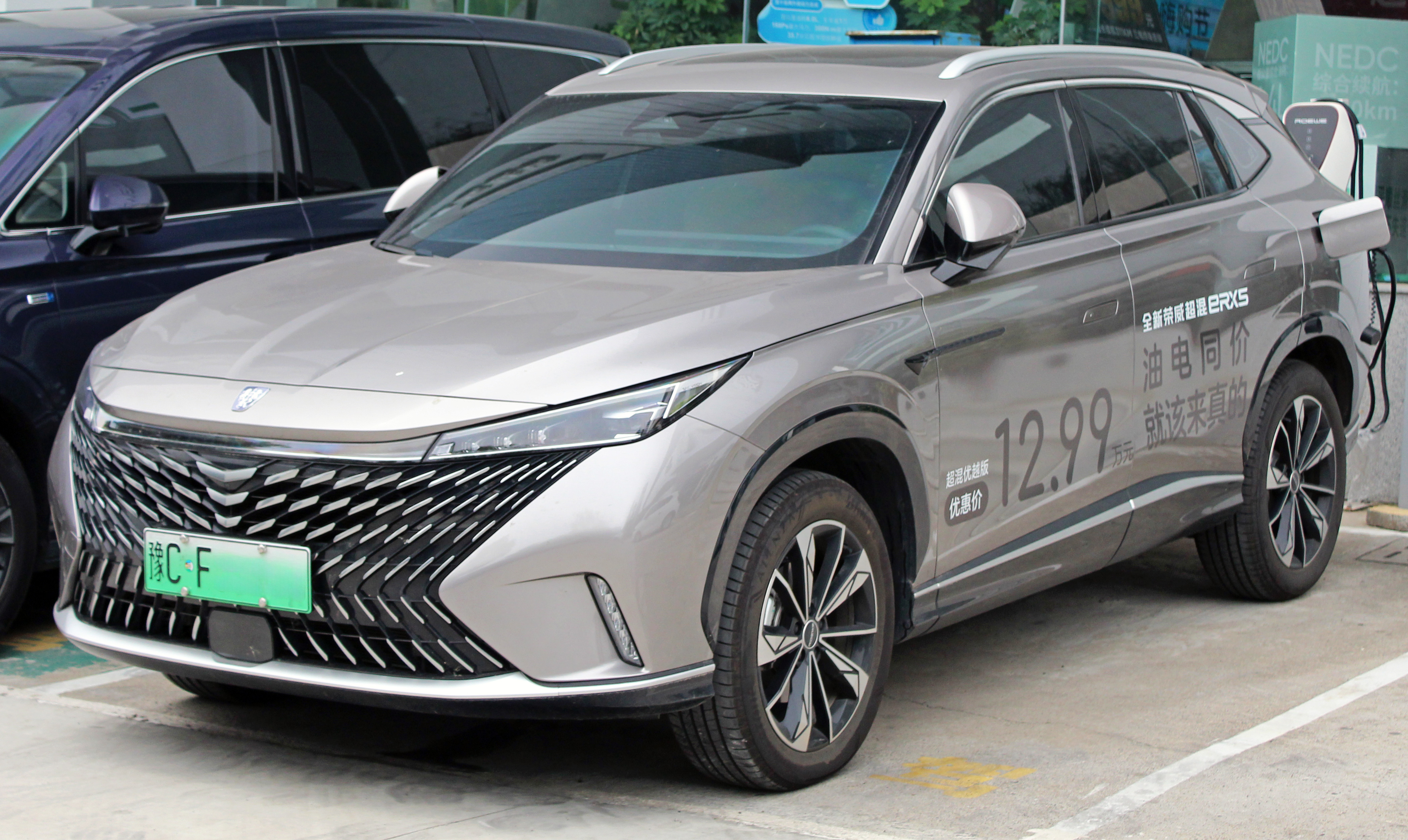

Overview
- Manufacturer: SAIC Motor
- Production: 2016–present

Body and chassis
- Class: Compact crossover SUV
- Body style: 5-door SUV
- Layout: Front-engine, front-wheel-drive Front-engine, four-wheel-drive (MG RX5 / Roewe RX5 Max)

Chronology
- Predecessor: Roewe W5

The Roewe RX5 is a compact crossover SUV that is manufactured by SAIC Motor under the Roewe brand. The RX5 is available as a petrol-powered RX5 variant, a plug-in hybrid eRX5 variant and a pure electric ERX5 variant. The facelift model is called the RX5 Plus.

In 2019, the second generation model called the RX5 Max with larger size is sold alongside the RX5 Plus. The RX5 Max is available as a petrol-powered and it has a PHEV variant called RX5 eMax. In 2021, the RX5 Max was facelifted.

In 2022, the third generation RX5 and its PHEV variant called eRX5 were launched. An upgraded PHEV version with new hybrid system called D5X was launched in 2024 to replace the eRX5.

== First generation (AS22, 2016) ==
First generation
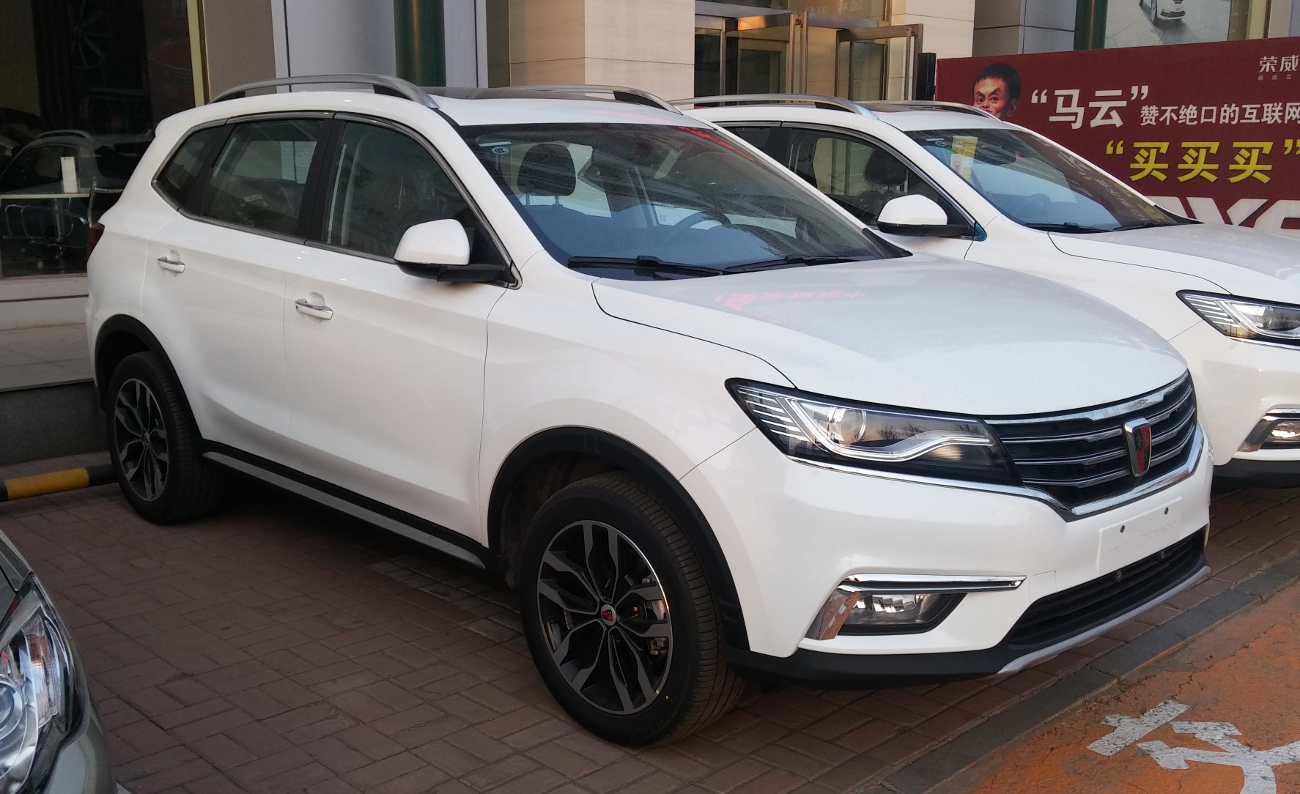

Overview
- Model code: AS22
- Also called: MG RX5; Roewe eRX5 (Plug-in Hybrid); Roewe ERX5 (Electric)
- Production: 2016–present
- Assembly: China: Pukou, Nanjing; Iran: Semnan (Farda Motors, 2018)

Body and chassis
- Related: MG GS; MG HS

Powertrain
- Engine: Petrol: 1.5 L 15E4E turbo I4; 2.0 L 20L4E turbo I4; Petrol Plug-in hybrid: 1.5 L SGE NetBlue + SAIC EDU turbo I4
- Electric motor: 85 kW Permanent magnet synchronous motor (ERX5)
- Transmission: 6-speed manual; 6-speed DCT; 7-speed DCT; 10-speed EDU; 2-speed electric transmission (eRX5 PHEV); Single-speed Automatic (ERX5)
- Hybrid drivetrain: PHEV (eRX5)
- Battery: 11.1 kWh Lithium-ion (eRX5 facelift); 12 kWh Lithium-ion (eRX5 pre-facelift); 48.3 kWh Lithium-ion (ERX5)

Dimensions
- Wheelbase: 2,700 mm (106.3 in)
- Length: 4,545–4,571 mm (178.9–180.0 in)
- Width: 1,855 mm (73.0 in)
- Height: 1,690–1,719 mm (66.5–67.7 in)
- Kerb weight: 1,468–1,771 kg (3,236–3,904 lb)

On 9 June 2016, Alibaba officially unveiled the Roewe RX5, its first “Internet car” in collaboration with SAIC. Priced upwards of RMB 148,800 ($22,300) when deliveries started in August 2016.

=== eRX5 and ERX5 ===
The RX5 came in three different powertrains, including the petrol engined RX5, the PHEV eRX5, and the fully electric ERX5. The capital "E" in Roewe's naming system indicates fully electric while the lower case "e" indicates hybrid.

Exterior styling differences are mainly on the front view, with the eRX5 and ERX5 having larger grilles and grille mounted front license plates. The only styling difference between the eRX5 and ERX5 are the different inner headlamp setup and graphics.

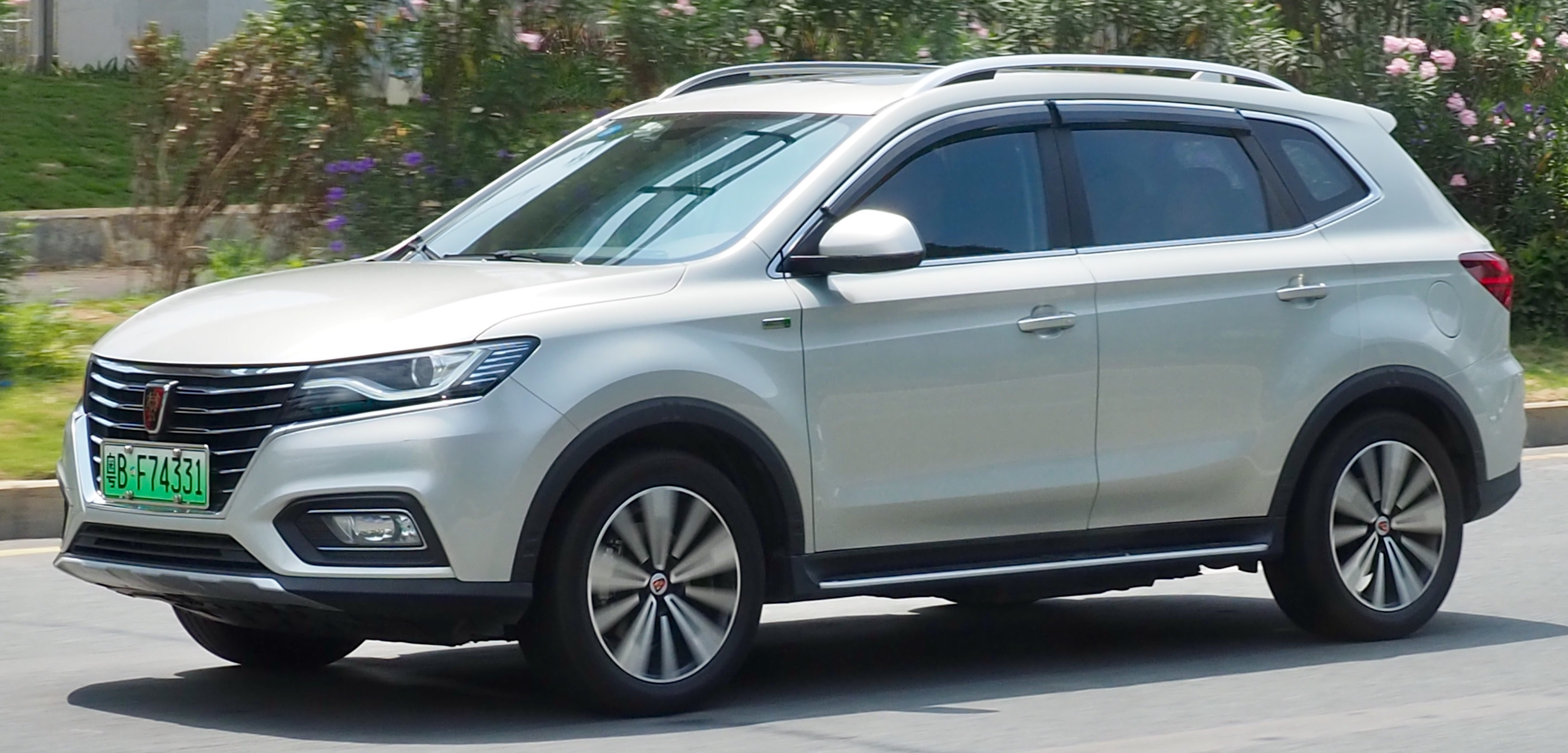
Roewe eRX5

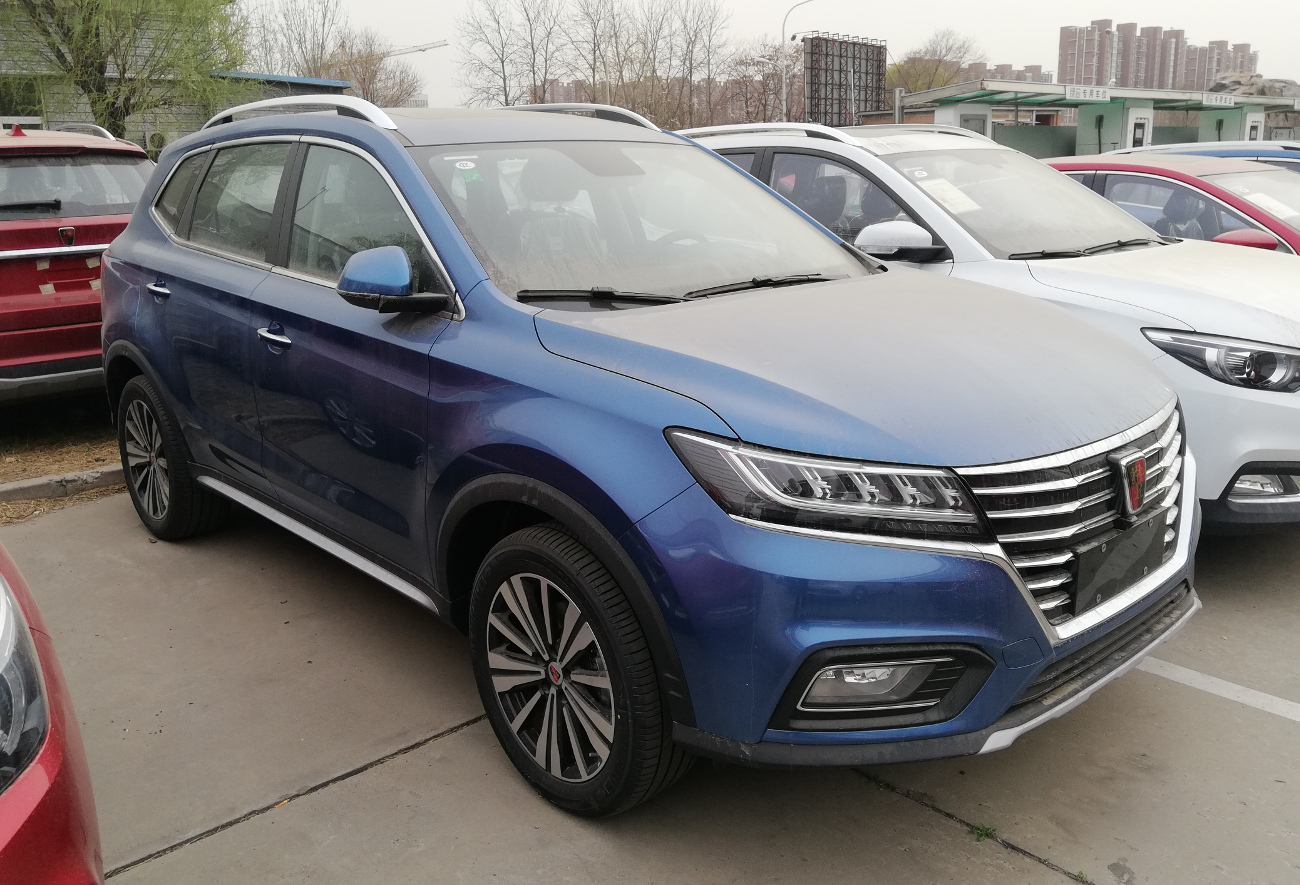
Roewe ERX5

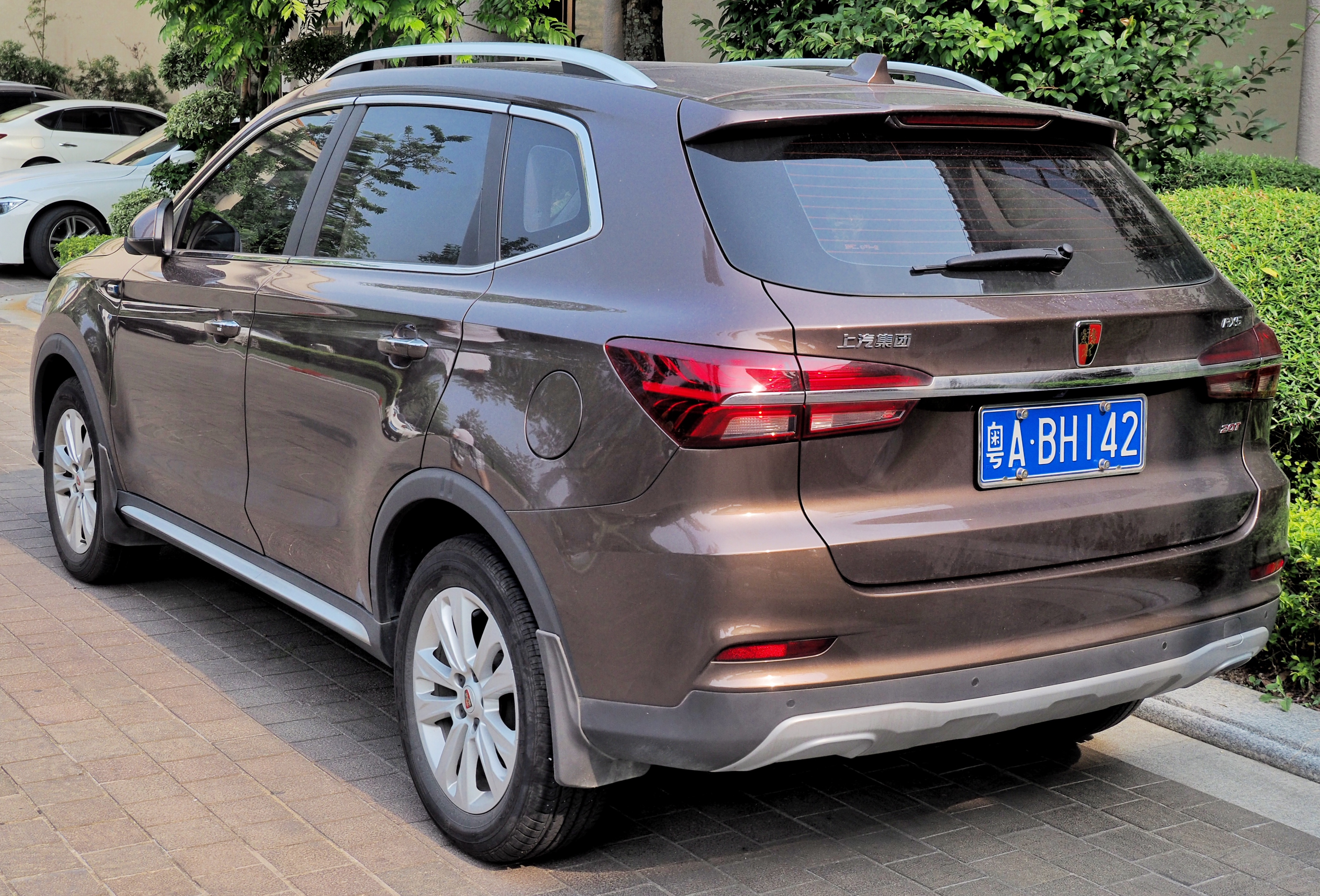
Roewe RX5 (rear)

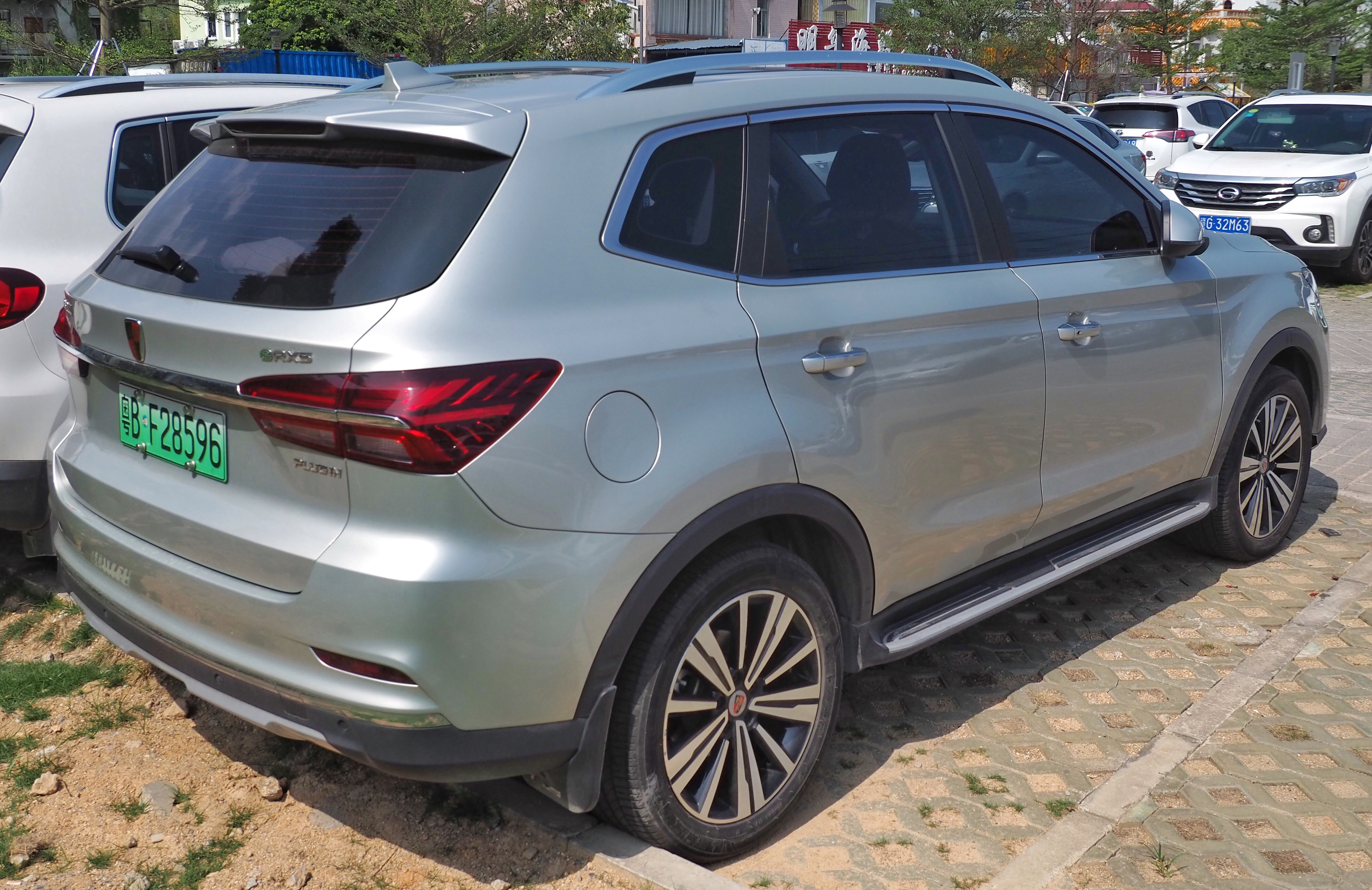
Roewe eRX5 (rear)

=== MG RX5 ===
The RX5 is also sold under the MG marque, though only with petrol powertrains. It was launched in the Middle East and the Philippines in February 2018. It is also sold in Cambodia, Iran, Mexico, and South America.

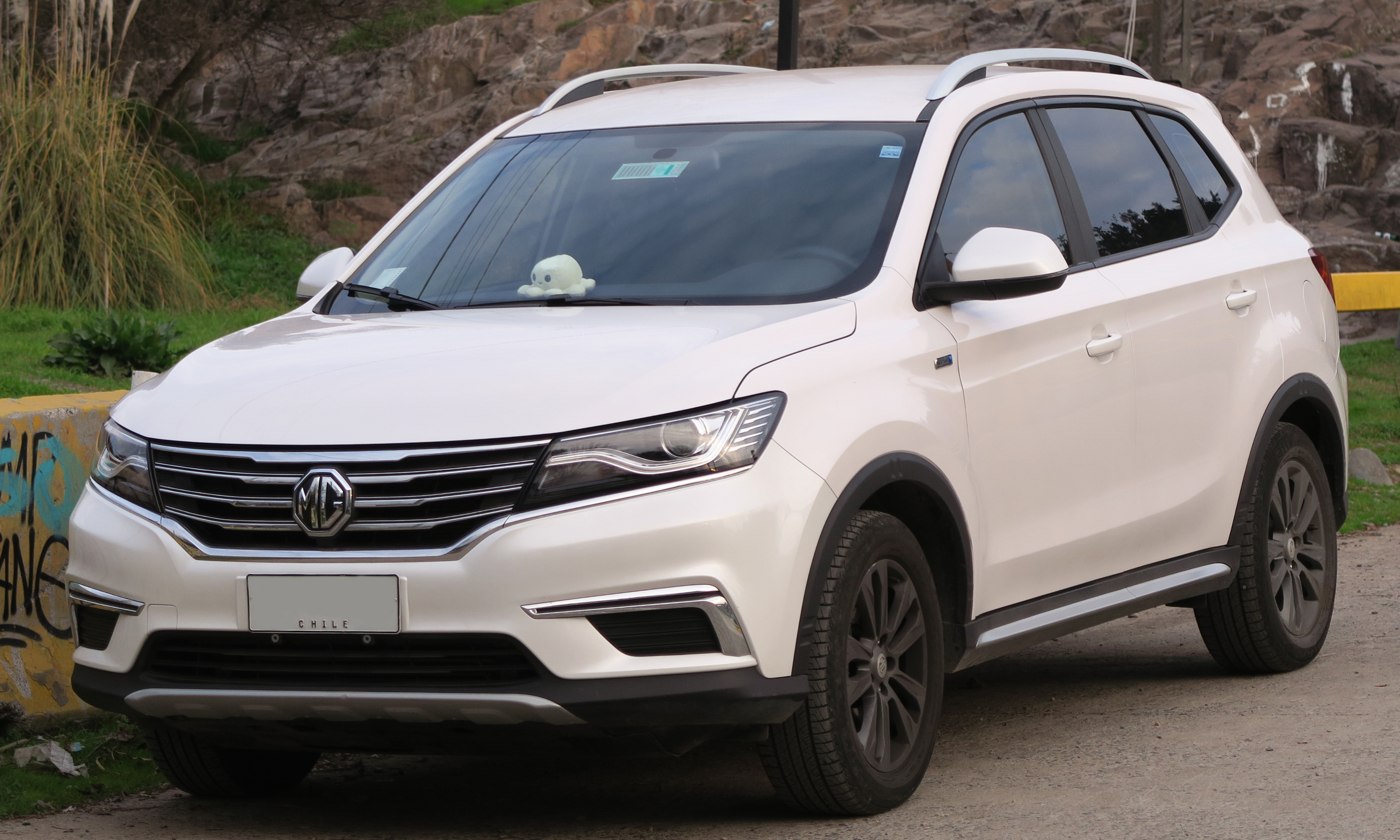
2021 MG RX5

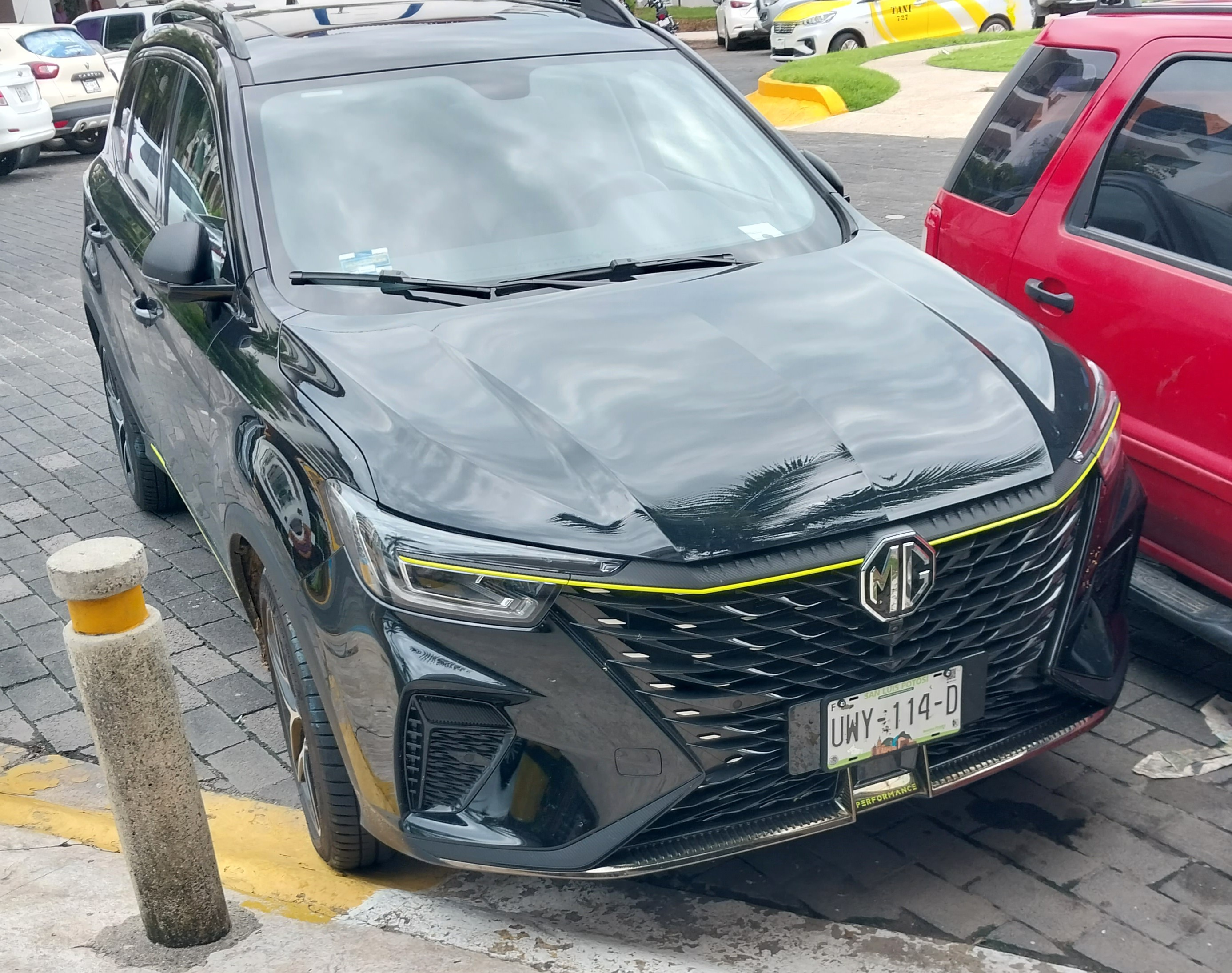
2024 MG RX5 (facelift)

=== RX5 Plus ===
In April 2020, SAIC released the Roewe RX5 Plus. It is essentially the facelift version of the standard RX5. It featured a new front fascia, including a new headlights, a new grille shape which adds one diamond like woven shape with a new black background Roewe logo, and a refreshed rear fascia.

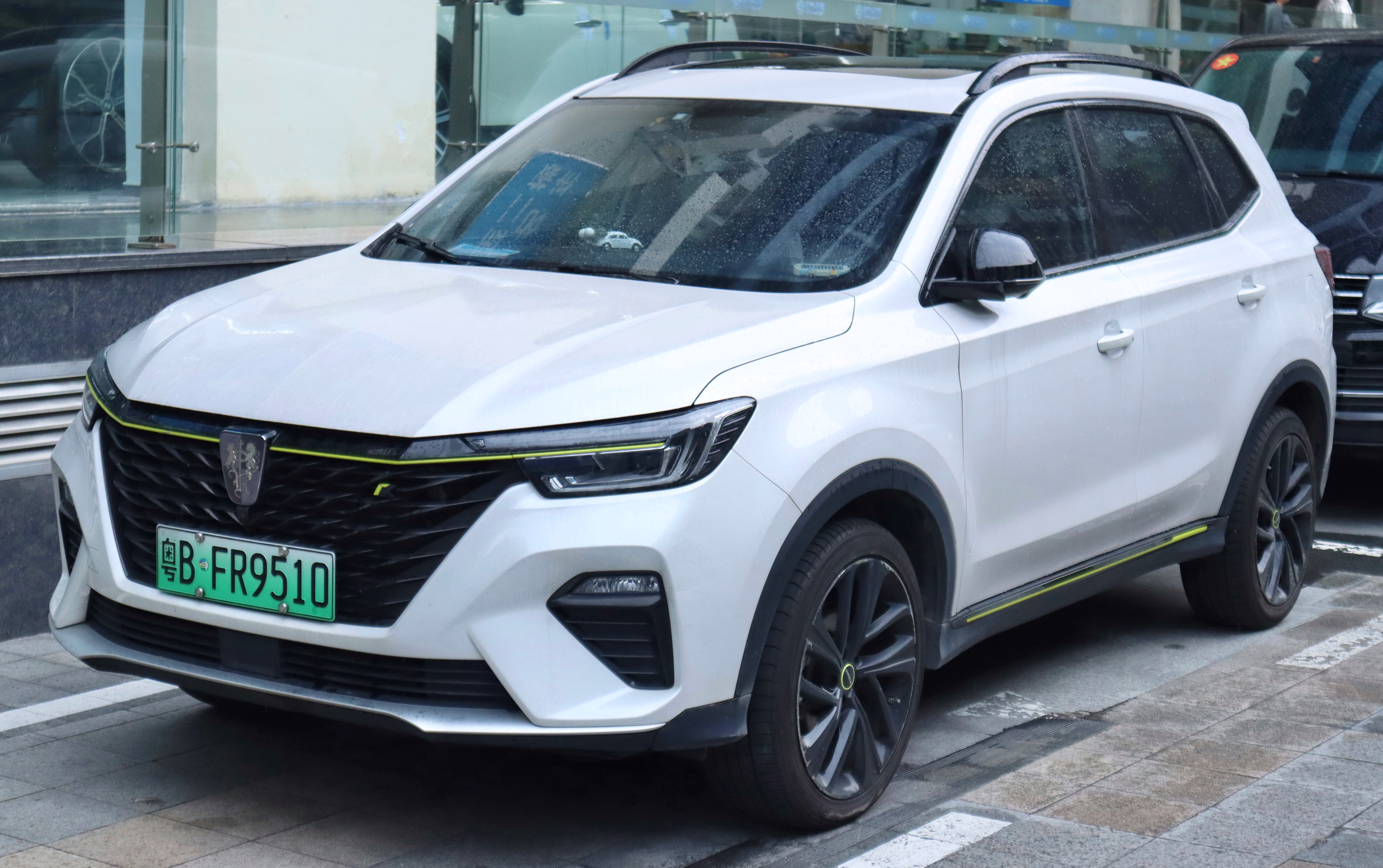
Roewe RX5 Plus (front)

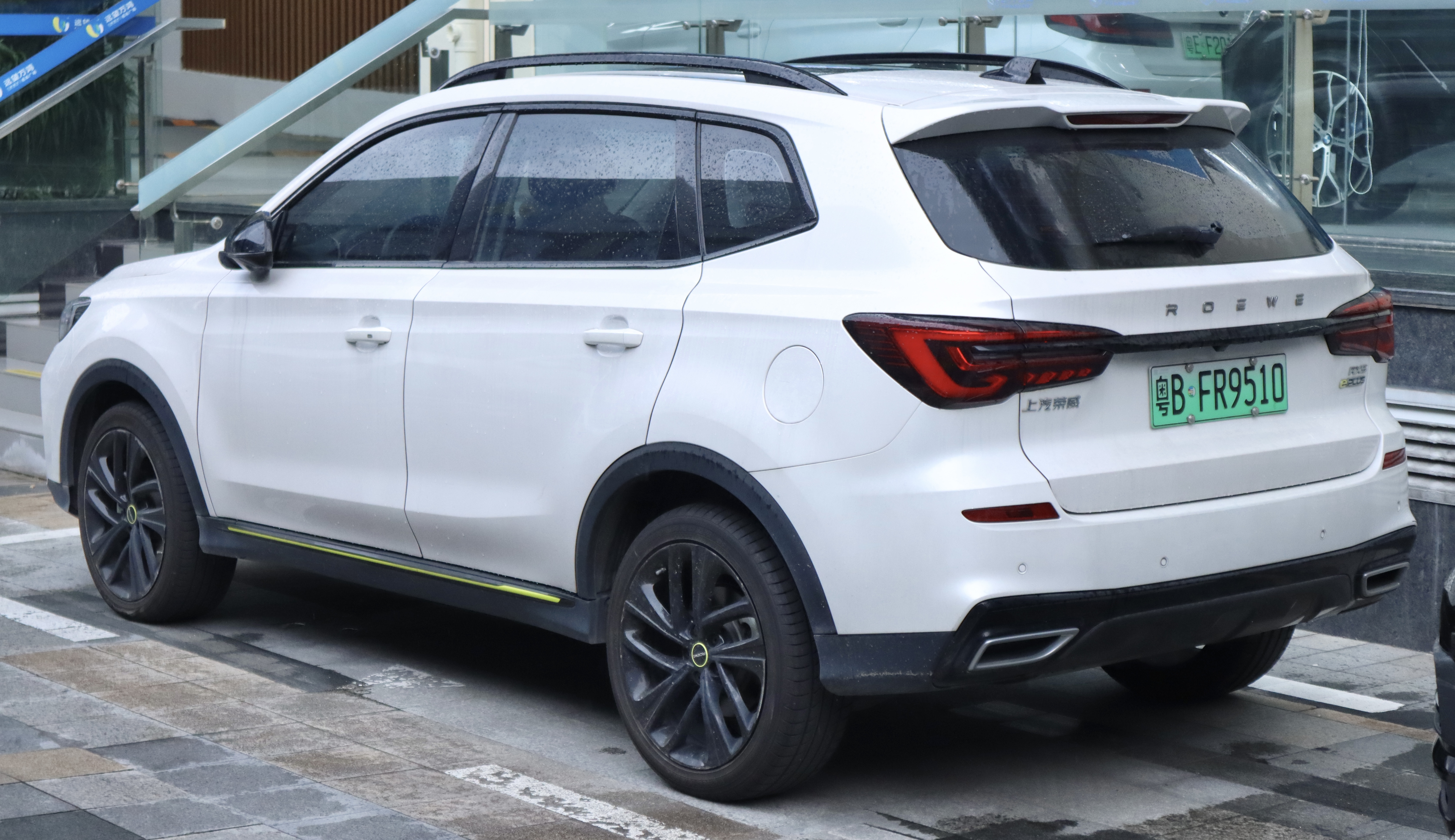
Roewe RX5 Plus (rear)

=== RX5 Plus facelift ===
The Roewe RX5 Plus received another facelift in 2021 mainly updating the front grilles. The 2021 model was unveiled at 2021 Auto Shanghai.

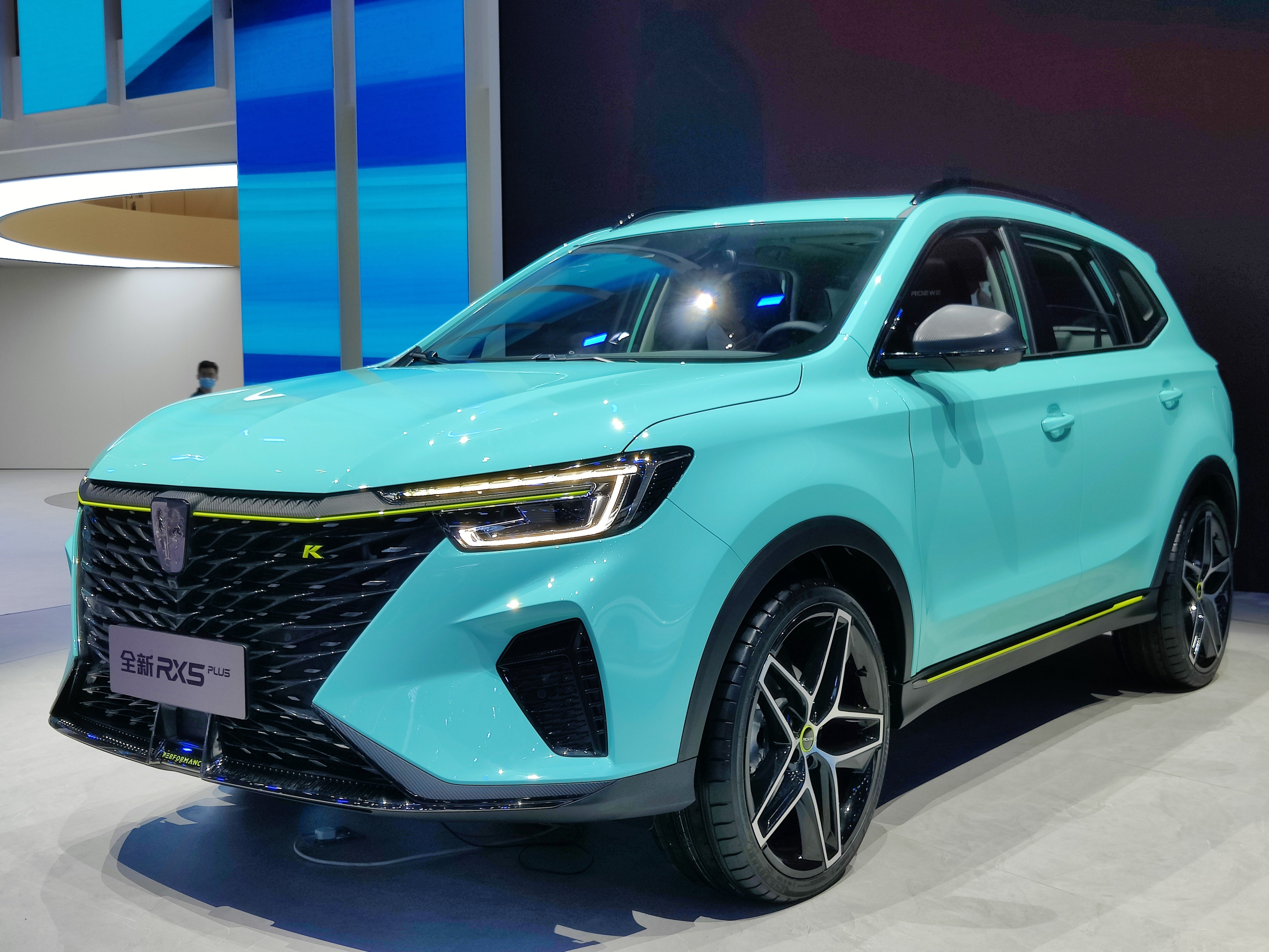
Roewe RX5 Plus MY2021 (front)

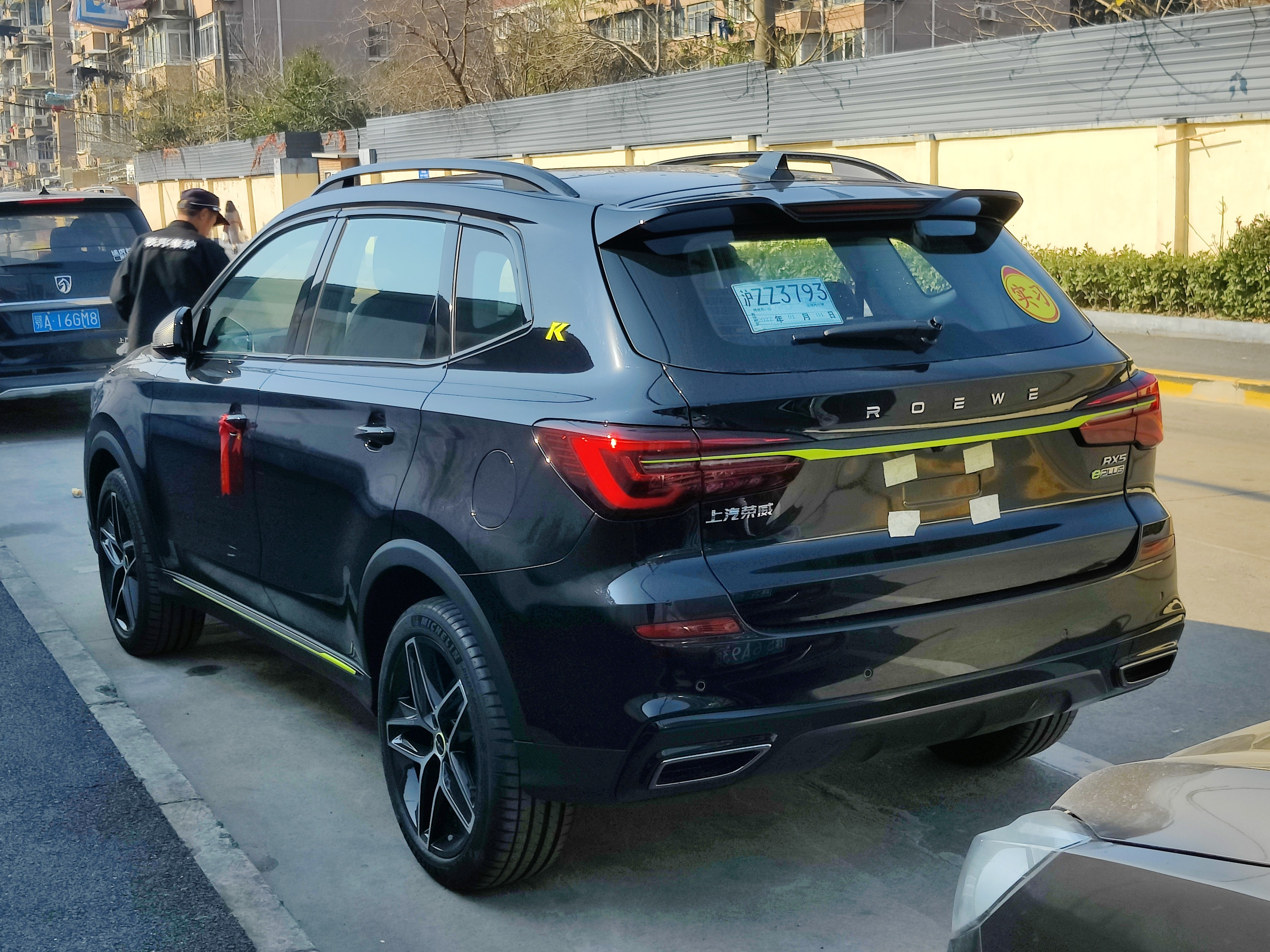
Roewe RX5 Plus MY2021 (rear)

=== Powertrains ===
Engines
Model	Years	Transmission	Engine	Power	Torque	0–100 km/h (0-62 mph) (Official)	Top speed
Petrol
SGE 1.5TGI	2016–2020	6-speed manual	1,490 cc turbo I4	124 kW (169 PS; 166 hp) at 5,600 rpm	250 N⋅m (184 lb⋅ft) at 1,700–4,400 rpm	9.5s	190 km/h (118 mph)
SGE 1.5TGI	2016–2020	7-speed DCT	1,490 cc turbo I4	124 kW (169 PS; 166 hp) at 5,600 rpm	250 N⋅m (184 lb⋅ft) at 1,700–4,400 rpm	9.8s	190 km/h (118 mph)
SGE 1.5TGI	2020–2021	7-speed DCT	1,490 cc turbo I4	127 kW (173 PS; 170 hp) at 5,600 rpm	275 N⋅m (203 lb⋅ft) at 1,750–4,000 rpm	9.4s	190 km/h (118 mph)
SGE 1.5TGI	2021–present	6-speed manual	1,490 cc turbo I4	133 kW (181 PS; 178 hp) at 5,600 rpm	285 N⋅m (210 lb⋅ft) at 1,500–4,000 rpm	9.9s	190 km/h (118 mph)
SGE 1.5TGI	2021–present	7-speed DCT	1,490 cc turbo I4	133 kW (181 PS; 178 hp) at 5,600 rpm	285 N⋅m (210 lb⋅ft) at 1,500–4,000 rpm		190 km/h (118 mph)
MGE 2.0TGI	2016–present	6-speed DCT	1,995 cc turbo I4	162 kW (220 PS; 217 hp) at 5,300 rpm	350 N⋅m (258 lb⋅ft) at 2,500–4,000 rpm	8.2s (FWD); 8.9s (AWD)	208 km/h (129 mph)
Plug-in Hybrid
SGE 1.5TGI PHEV	2016–2019	2-speed automatic	1,490 cc turbo I4	119 kW (162 PS; 160 hp) at 5,500 rpm (Engine)	704 N⋅m (519 lb⋅ft) (Combined)	7.8s	200 km/h (124 mph)
SGE 1.5TGI PHEV	2019–2020	2-speed automatic	1,490 cc turbo I4	119 kW (162 PS; 160 hp) at 5,500 rpm (Engine)	704 N⋅m (519 lb⋅ft) (Combined)	8.2s	200 km/h (124 mph)
SGE 1.5TGI PHEV	2020–2021	10-speed EDU	1,490 cc turbo I4	224 kW (305 PS; 300 hp) (Combined)	480 N⋅m (354 lb⋅ft) (Combined)	7.5s	200 km/h (124 mph)
Electric
Permanent magnet synchronous motor	2017	1-speed automatic	-	85 kW (116 PS; 114 hp)	255 N⋅m (188 lb⋅ft) at 1,700–4,400 rpm		135 km/h (84 mph)

== Second generation, RX5 Max (AS28, 2019) ==
RX5 Max
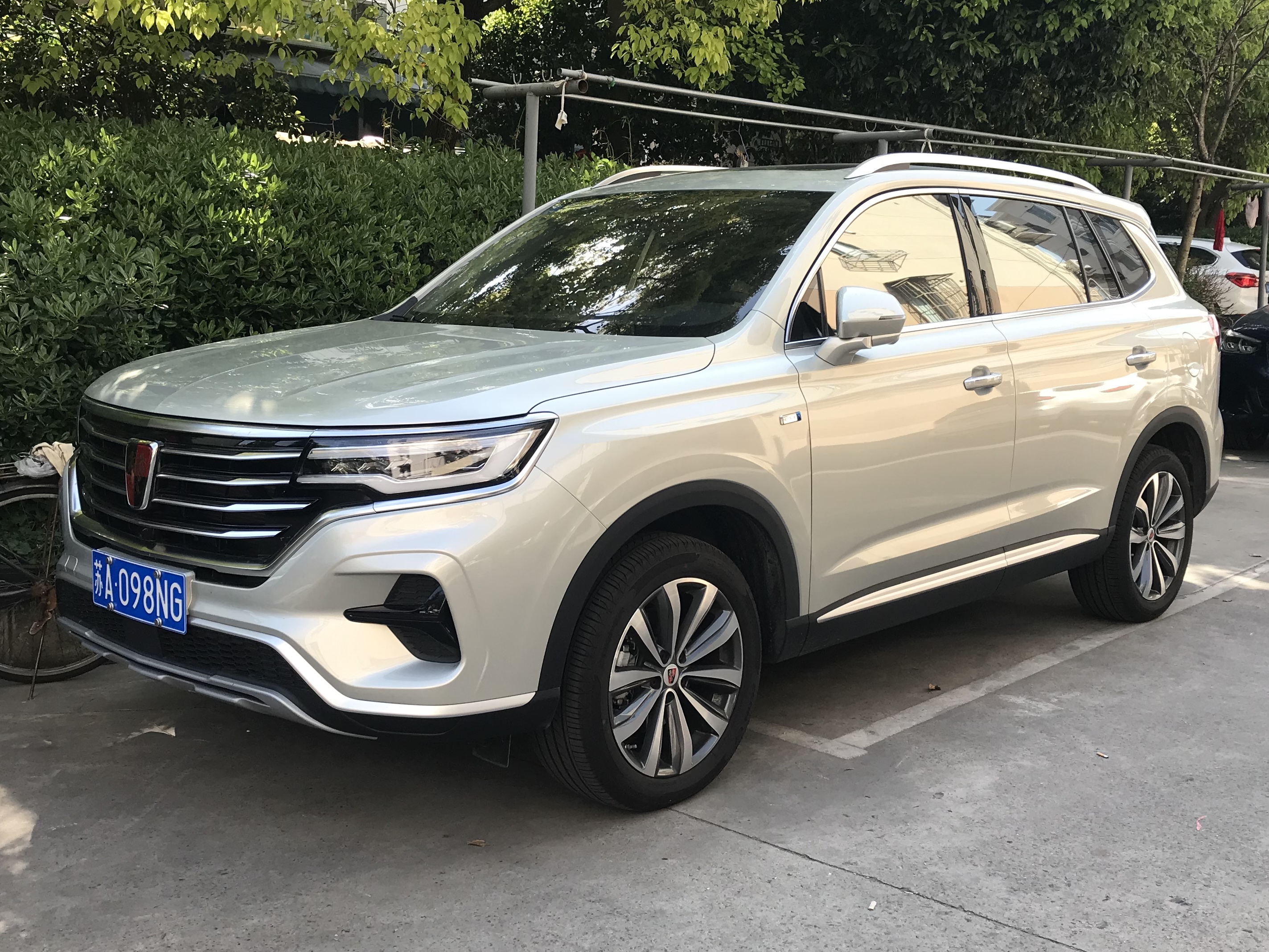

Overview
- Model code: AS28
- Also called: Roewe RX5 eMax (Plug-in Hybrid)
- Production: 2019–2023

Body and chassis
- Layout: Front-engine, front-wheel-drive Front-engine, four-wheel-drive
- Related: Roewe Jing

Powertrain
- Engine: 1.5 L 15E4E I4 turbo (petrol); 2.0 L 20L4E I4 turbo (petrol); 1.5 L SGE NetBlue + SAIC EDU turbo I4 (RX5 eMAX)
- Electric motor: 90kW Permanent magnet synchronous motor
- Transmission: 6-speed manual; 6-speed automatic; 8-speed automatic; 6-speed DCT; 10-speed EDU intelligent electric drive variable speed and iEM intelligent energy management system (6-speed engine and 4-speed electric motor)
- Hybrid drivetrain: Plug-in Hybrid (RX5 eMAX)

Dimensions
- Wheelbase: 2,760 mm (108.7 in)
- Length: 4,647–4,676 mm (183.0–184.1 in)
- Width: 1,875–1,891 mm (73.8–74.4 in)
- Height: 1,725 mm (67.9 in)
- Kerb weight: 1,588–1,789 kg (3,501–3,944 lb)

The Roewe RX5 Max was previewed during the 2019 Shanghai Auto Show, as the Roewe Max pre production concept.

The model was later revealed as the Roewe RX5 Max. The model is designed to be a larger and more upmarket alternative to the RX5.

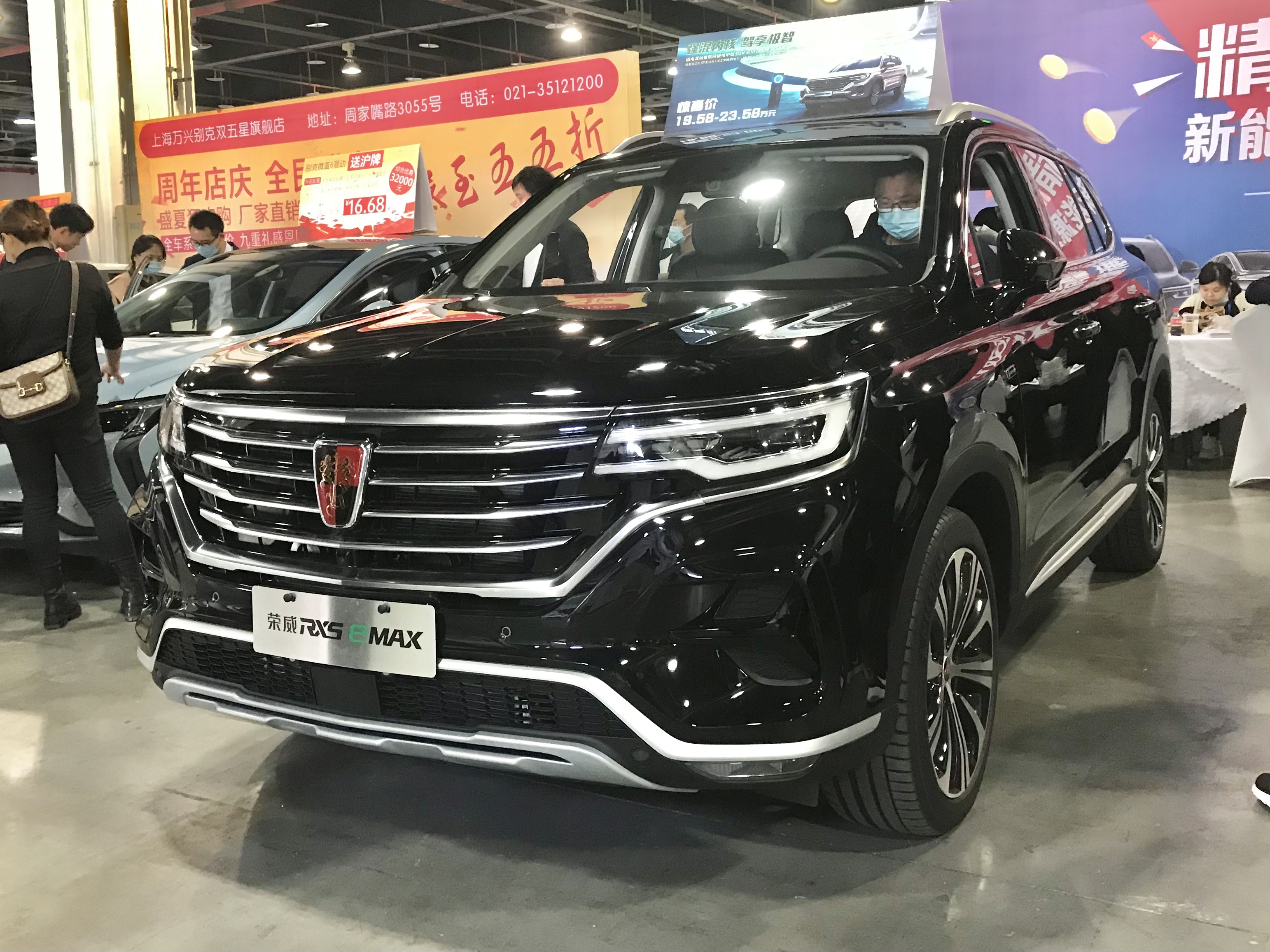
Roewe RX5 eMax (front)

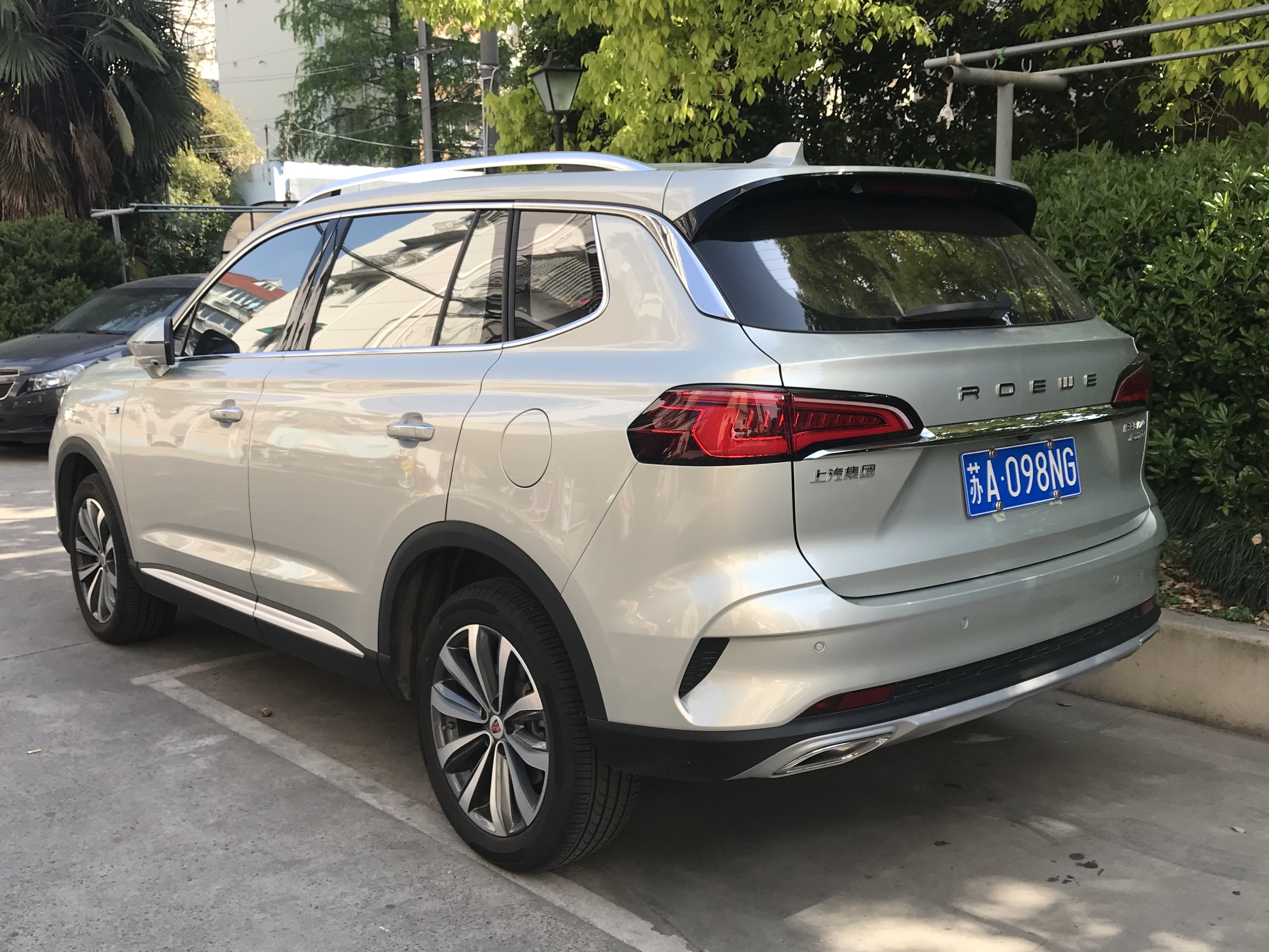
Roewe RX5 Max (rear)

=== Powertrain ===
The Roewe RX5 Max is powered by the same engine of the Roewe RX5, including the 1.5 litre turbo inline four engine, and the 2.0 litre turbo inline four engine. Transmission options include a six speed manual gearbox, a six speed automatic gearbox, a six speed dual clutch transmission.

=== RX5 eMax ===
The RX5 eMax is the plug-in hybrid version of the RX5 Max crossover. It is powered by a 1.5 liter turbo engine and an electric motor. The transmission is a 10-speed transmission by SAIC. The pure electric range of the RX5 eMax is 70 kilometres (43 mi), and the fuel consumption is 1.4 L/100 km (200 mpg_{‑imp}; 170 mpg_{‑US}).

=== 2021 facelift ===
The Roewe RX5 Max received a facelift for the 2021 model year and was launched during the 2020 Guangzhou Auto Show in November 2020. The facelift carries over the same powertrain while featuring a full-width headlamp across the front fascia and the updated Roewe logo.

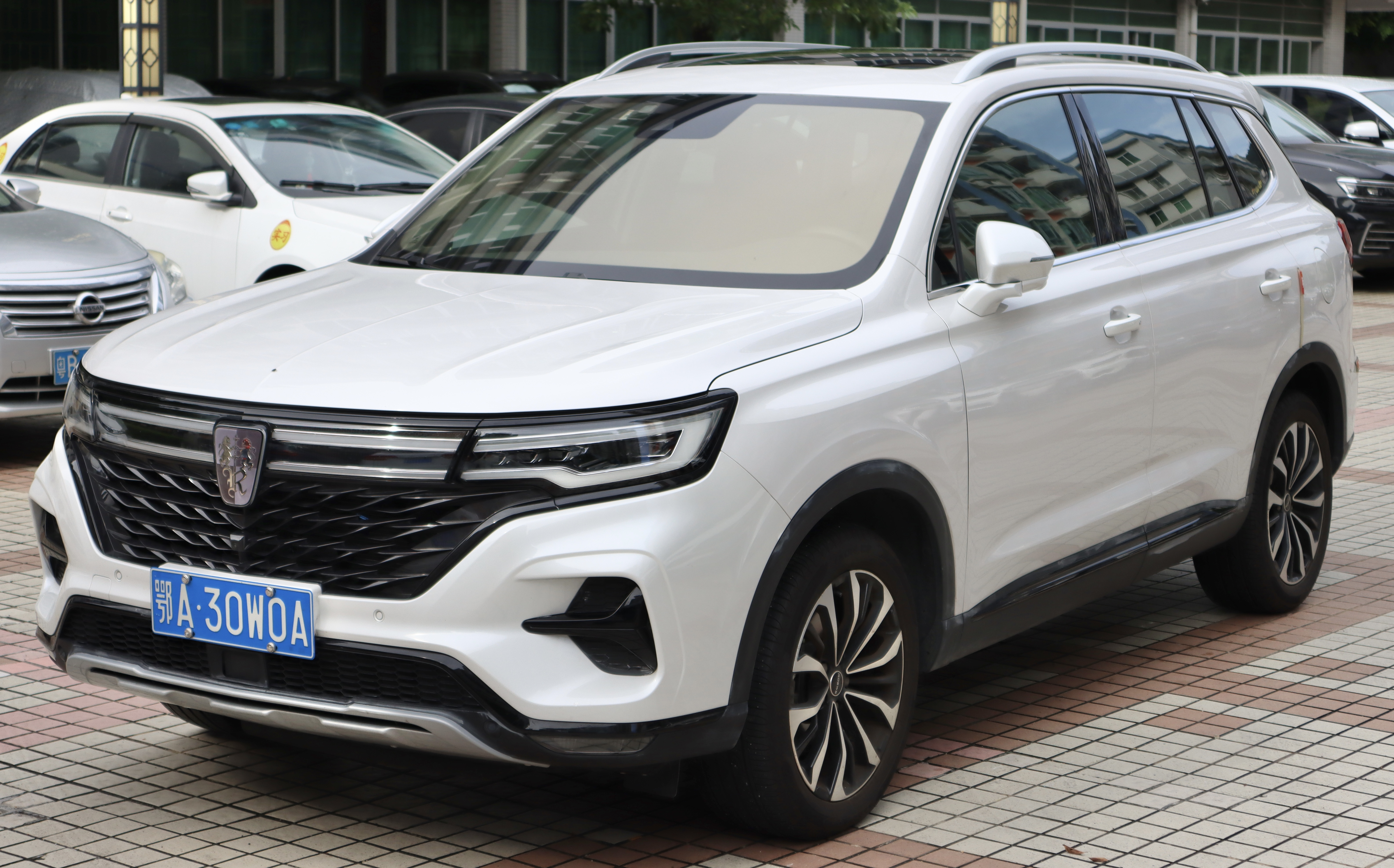
Roewe RX5 Max facelift (front)

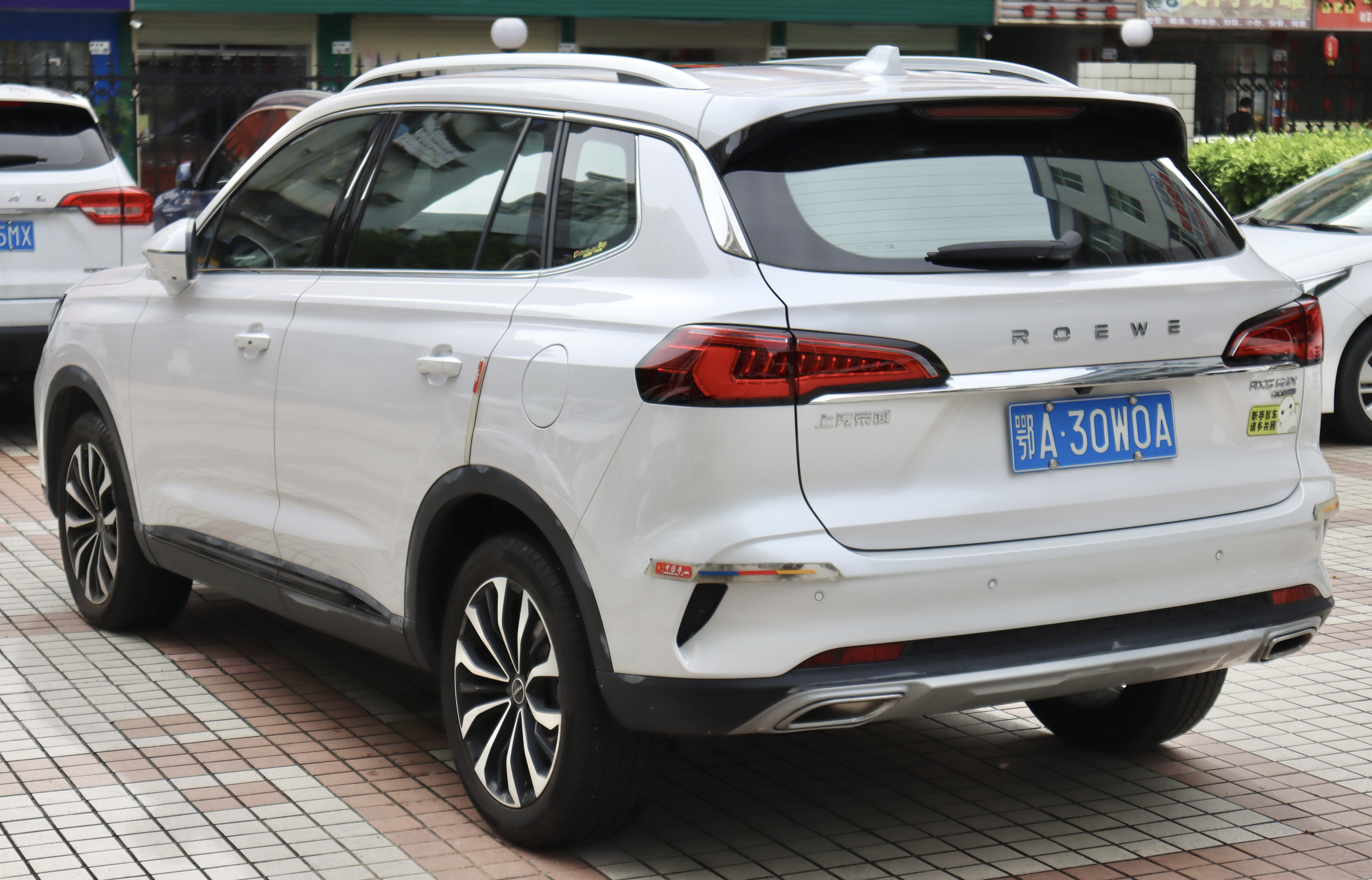
Roewe RX5 Max facelift (rear)

=== 2022 facelift ===
The Roewe RX5 Max received another facelift for the 2022 model year and was launched in December 2021. The update completely restyled the front end and slightly revised the rear end styling.

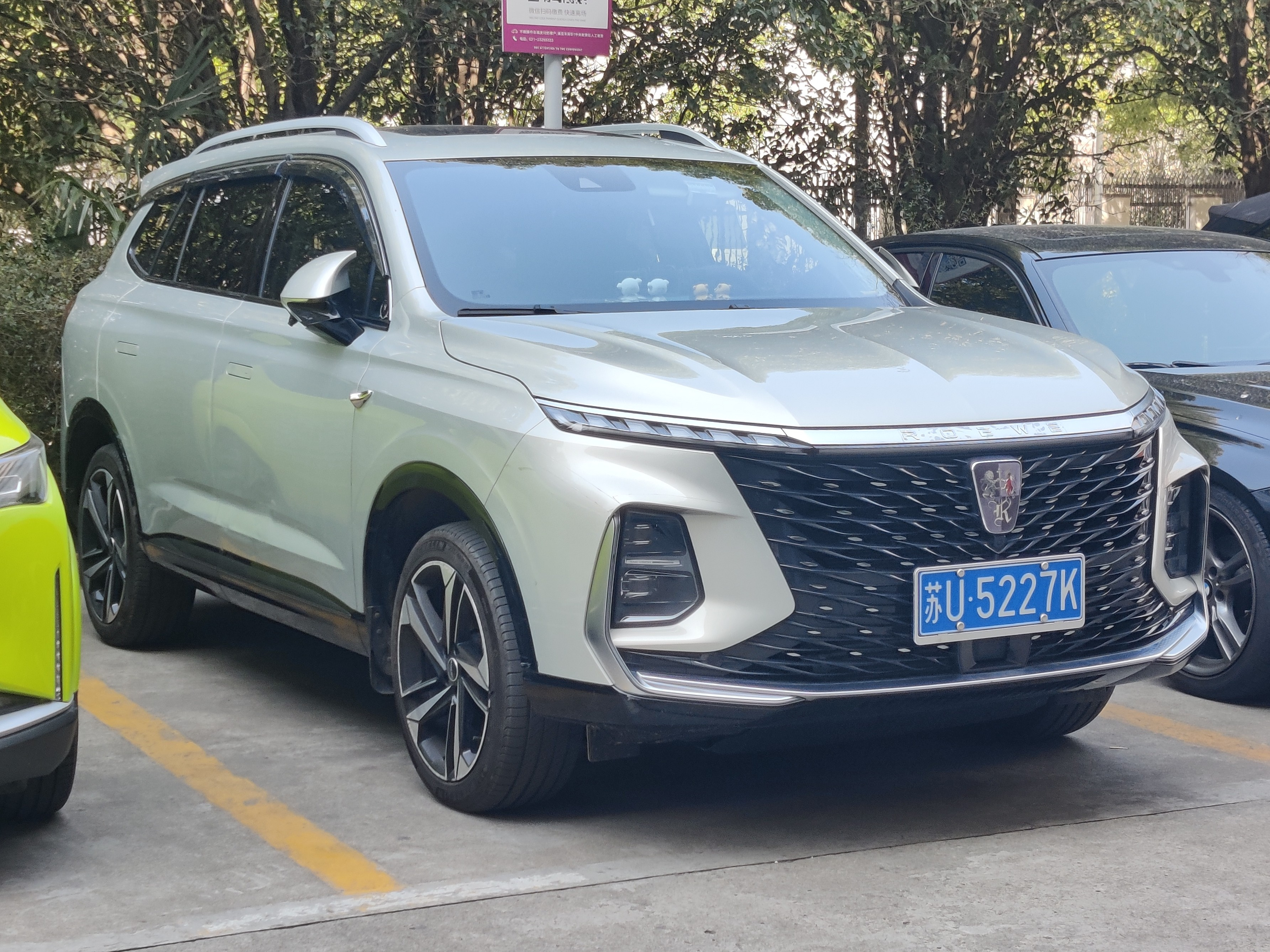
Roewe RX5 Max 2022 facelift (front)

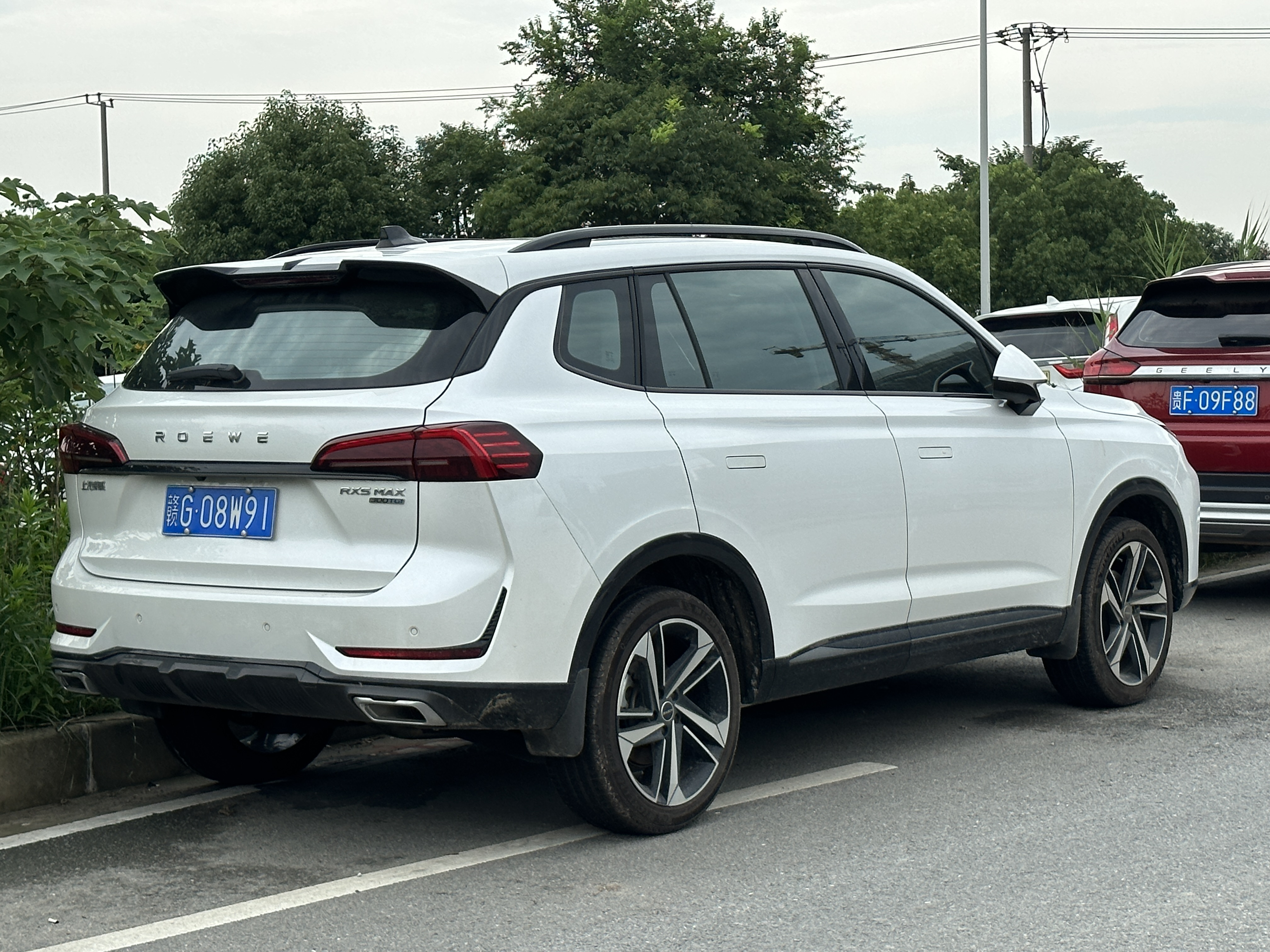
Roewe RX5 Max 2022 facelift (rear)

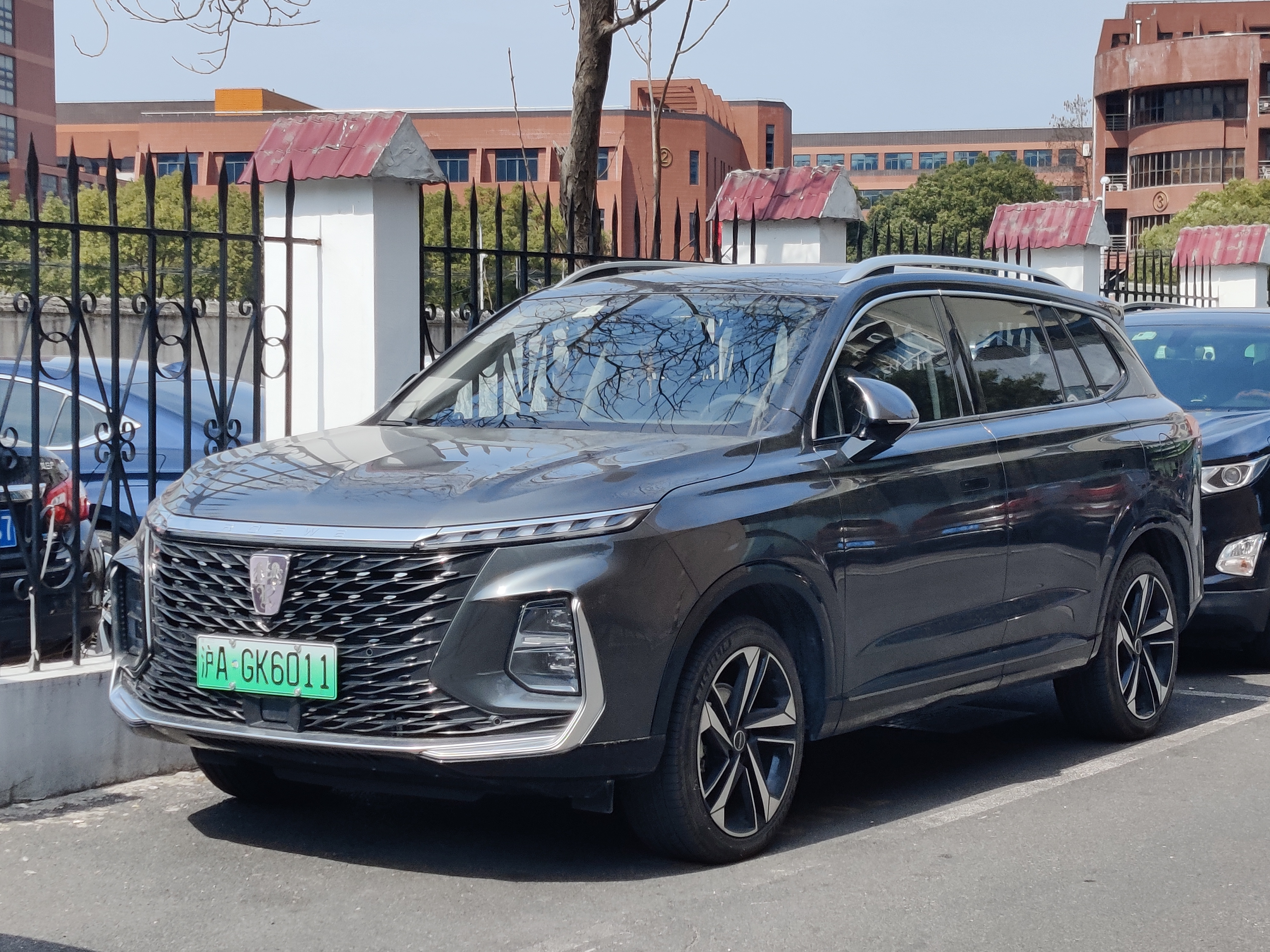
Roewe RX5 eMax 2022 facelift (front)

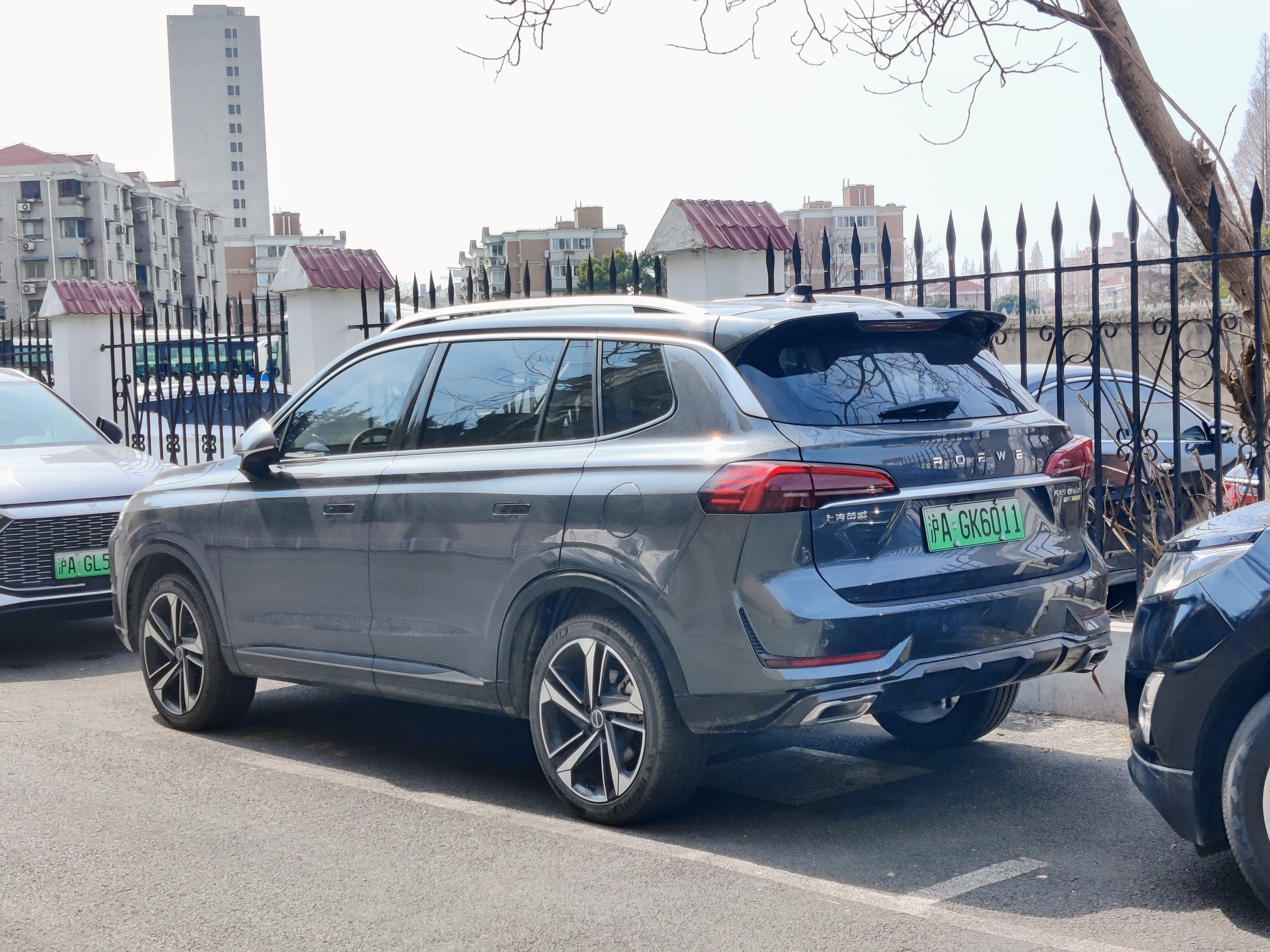
Roewe RX5 eMax 2022 facelift (rear)

== Third generation (AS33, 2022) ==
Third generation
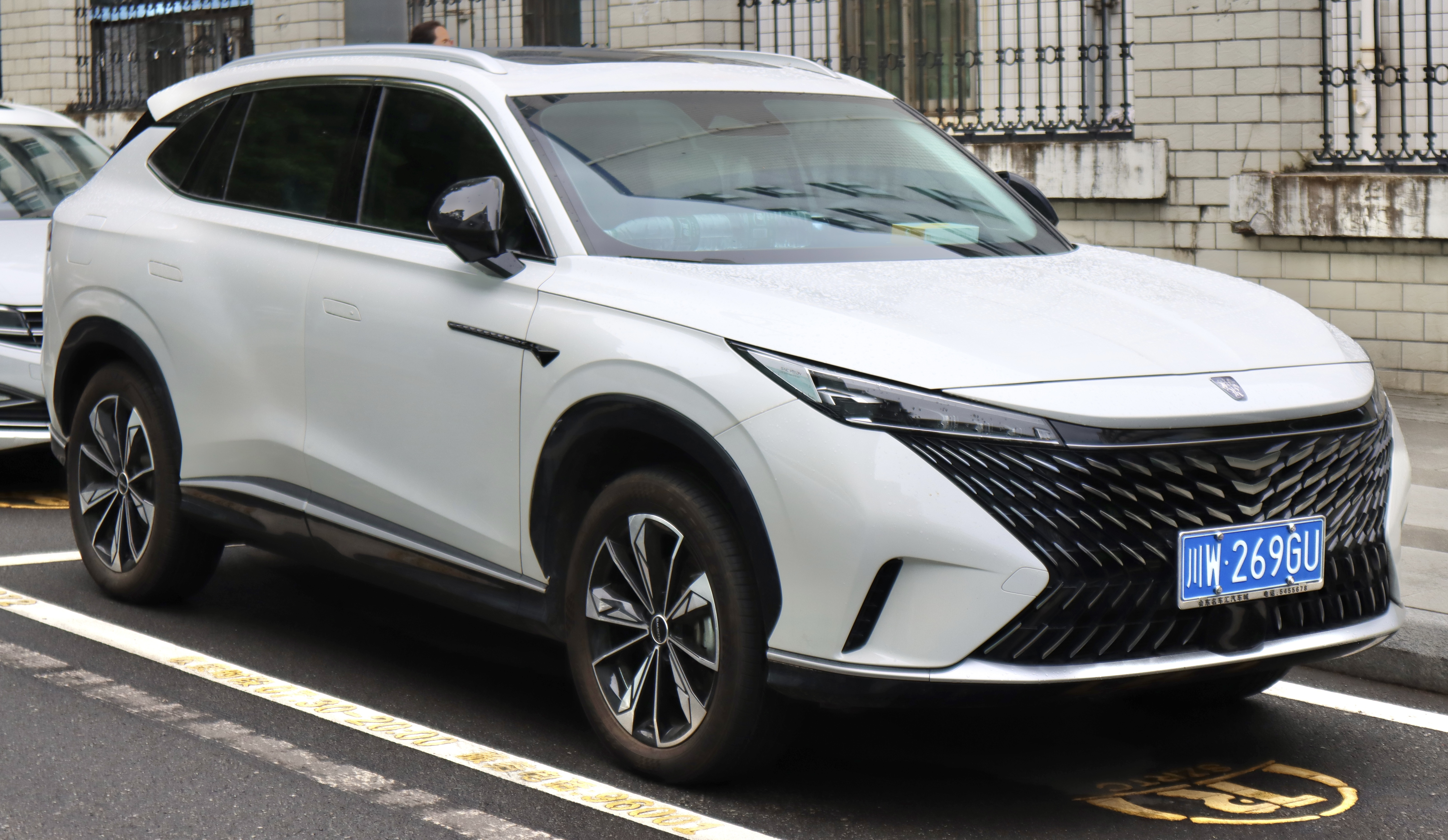
- Roewe RX5

Overview
- Model code: AS33
- Also called: Roewe D5X (hybrid); Roewe eRX5 (plug-in hybrid); MG HS (second generation); Moskvich M70 (Russia; 2026 model planned)
- Production: 2022–2026

Powertrain
- Engine: Petrol: 1.5 L 15FDE turbo I4; Petrol hybrid: 1.5 L 15FKE turbo I4; Petrol plug-in hybrid: 1.5 L 15FDE turbo I4
- Transmission: 7-speed DCT; 2-speed DHT; 10-speed EDU
- Battery: 12.3 kWh lithium-ion (eRX5 plug-in hybrid); 21.4 kWh lithium-ion (D5X plug-in hybrid)

Dimensions
- Wheelbase: 2,765 mm (108.9 in)
- Length: 4,655 mm (183.3 in)
- Width: 1,890 mm (74.4 in)
- Height: 1,664 mm (65.5 in)
- Curb weight: 1,600–1,670 kg (3,527–3,682 lb) (petrol); 1,840–1,880 kg (4,057–4,145 lb) (hybrid/plug-in hybrid)

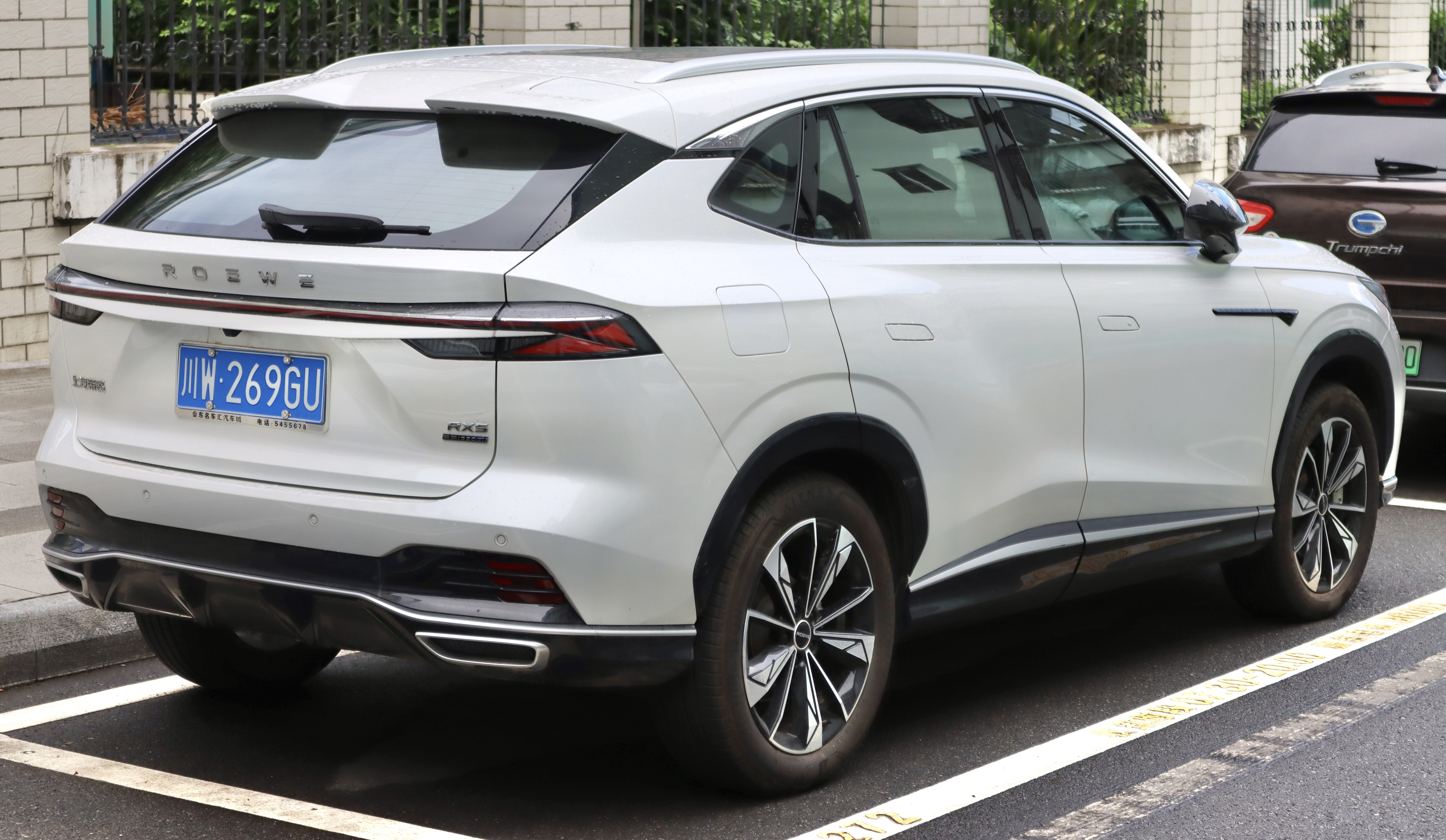
Rear view

Images of the third generation Roewe RX5 was released in March 2022. The third generation RX5 is powered by a 1.5 liter turbo engine codenamed 15FDE producing a maximum power output of 188 hp (140 kW; 191 PS) mated to a 7-speed wet dual clutch transmission. The engine is the updated version of the second generation Blue Core powertrain of SAIC.

=== eRX5 ===
The third generation Roewe RX5 is also available as a plug-in hybrid variant called the Roewe eRX5. The PHEV variant is powered by SAIC's Blue Core GS61 1.5-litre turbo VTGI engine developing 138 kW (185 hp; 188 PS) and an electric motor with a maximum output of 180 kW (241 hp; 245 PS) and 570 N⋅m (420 lb⋅ft; 58.1 kg⋅m). The transmission is a 10-speed automatic gearbox. Top speed of the eRX5 is 200 km/h (120 mph) and acceleration from 0 to 100 km/h (0 to 62 mph) takes 6.9 seconds, fuel consumption is 3.3 litres per 100 kilometres (30.3 km/L; 71.3 mpg_{‑US}; 85.6 mpg_{‑imp}).

=== D5X ===
The Roewe D5X is the Plug-in hybrid variant of the third generation Roewe RX5. The D5X is powered by the DMH system consisting of a 1.5-liter Turbo engine producing 110kW and an electric motor producing 153kW.

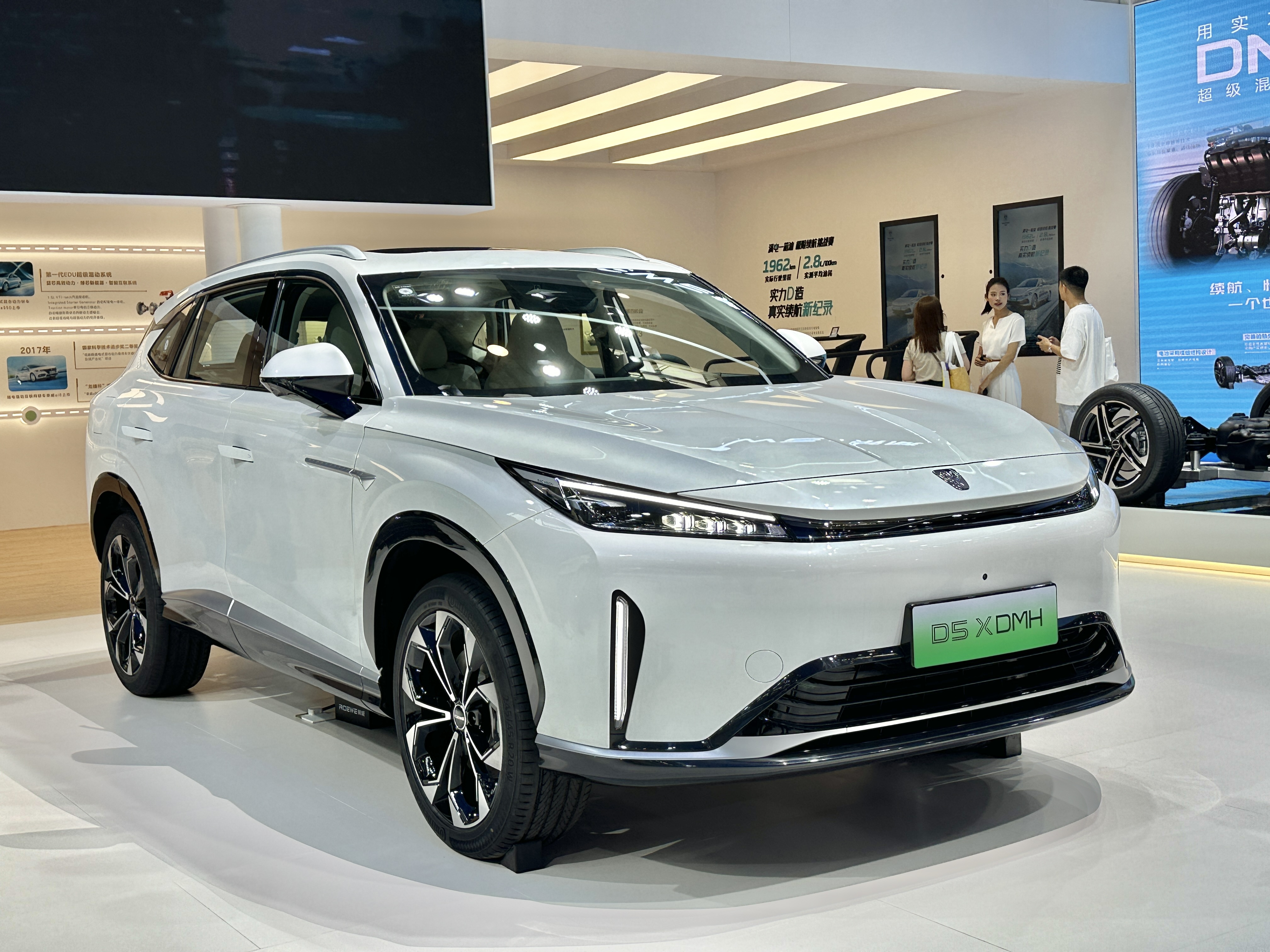
Roewe D5X (front)

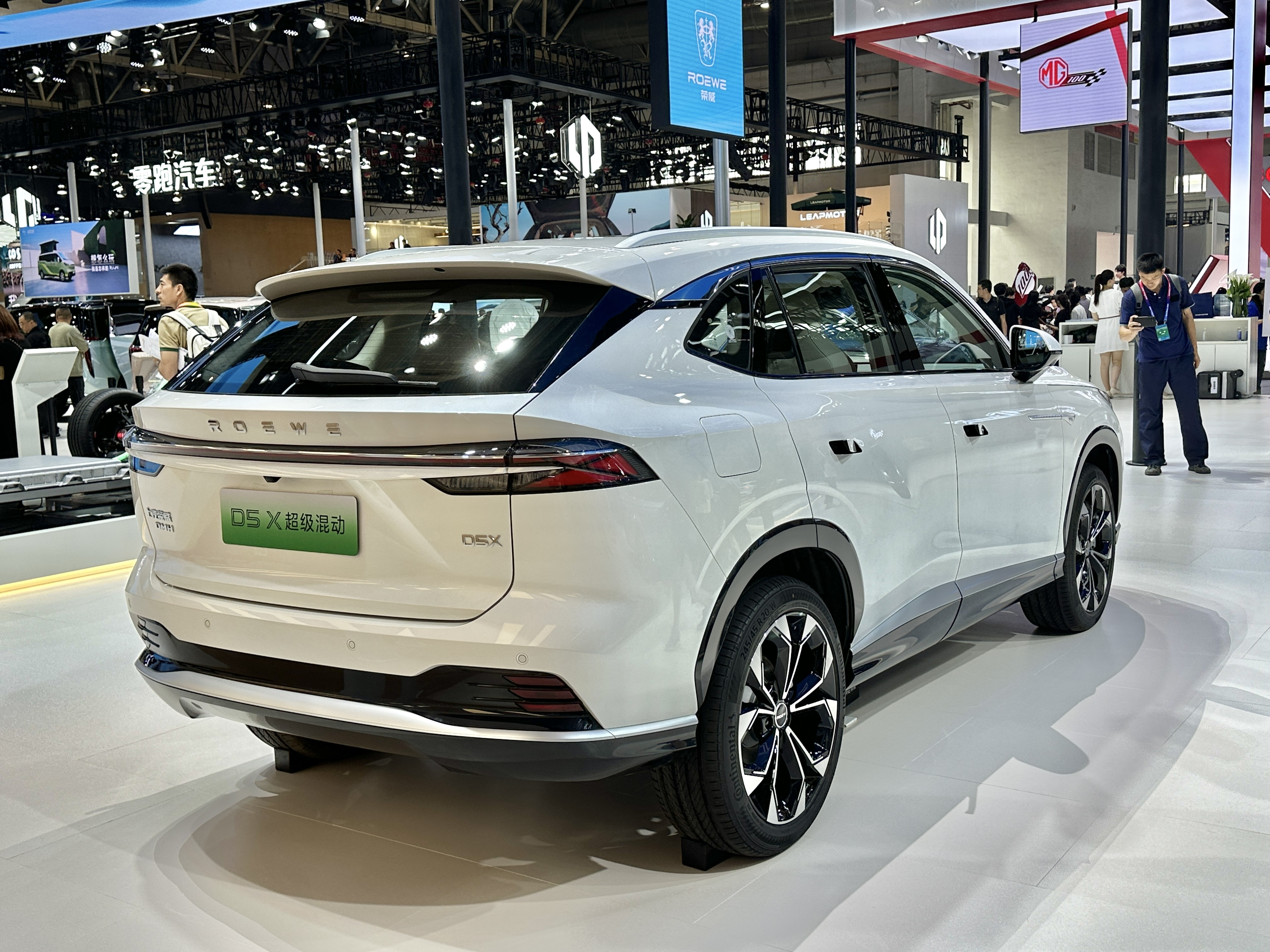
Roewe D5X (rear)

=== Powertrain ===
Specs
Engines
Model	Transmission	Engine	Power	Torque	0–100 km/h (0-62 mph) (Official)	Top speed
Petrol
RX5	7-speed DCT	1,496 cc turbo I4	138 kW (188 PS; 185 hp) at 5,500–6,000 rpm	300 N⋅m (221 lb⋅ft) at 1,500–4,000 rpm	9.3s	190 km/h (118 mph)
Plug-in Hybrid
D5X	2-speed DHT	1,496 cc turbo I4	110 kW (150 PS; 148 hp) (Engine); 145 kW (197 PS; 194 hp) (Motor)	235 N⋅m (173 lb⋅ft) (Engine); 350 N⋅m (258 lb⋅ft) (Motor)	6.9s	200 km/h (124 mph)
eRX5	10-speed	1,496 cc turbo I4	138 kW (188 PS; 185 hp) at 5,500–6,000 rpm (Engine); 180 kW (245 PS; 241 hp) (Motor)	570 N⋅m (420 lb⋅ft) (Combined)	6.9s	200 km/h (124 mph)

== Sales ==
Year	China				
Year	RX5	eRX5	D5X	RX5 Max	RX5 eMax
2023	31,739	3,179	17	6,266	162
2024	17,855	2,764	4,914	178	244
2025	18,308	2,160	3,187	329	—
