= Roewe Jing =

Compact crossover SUV

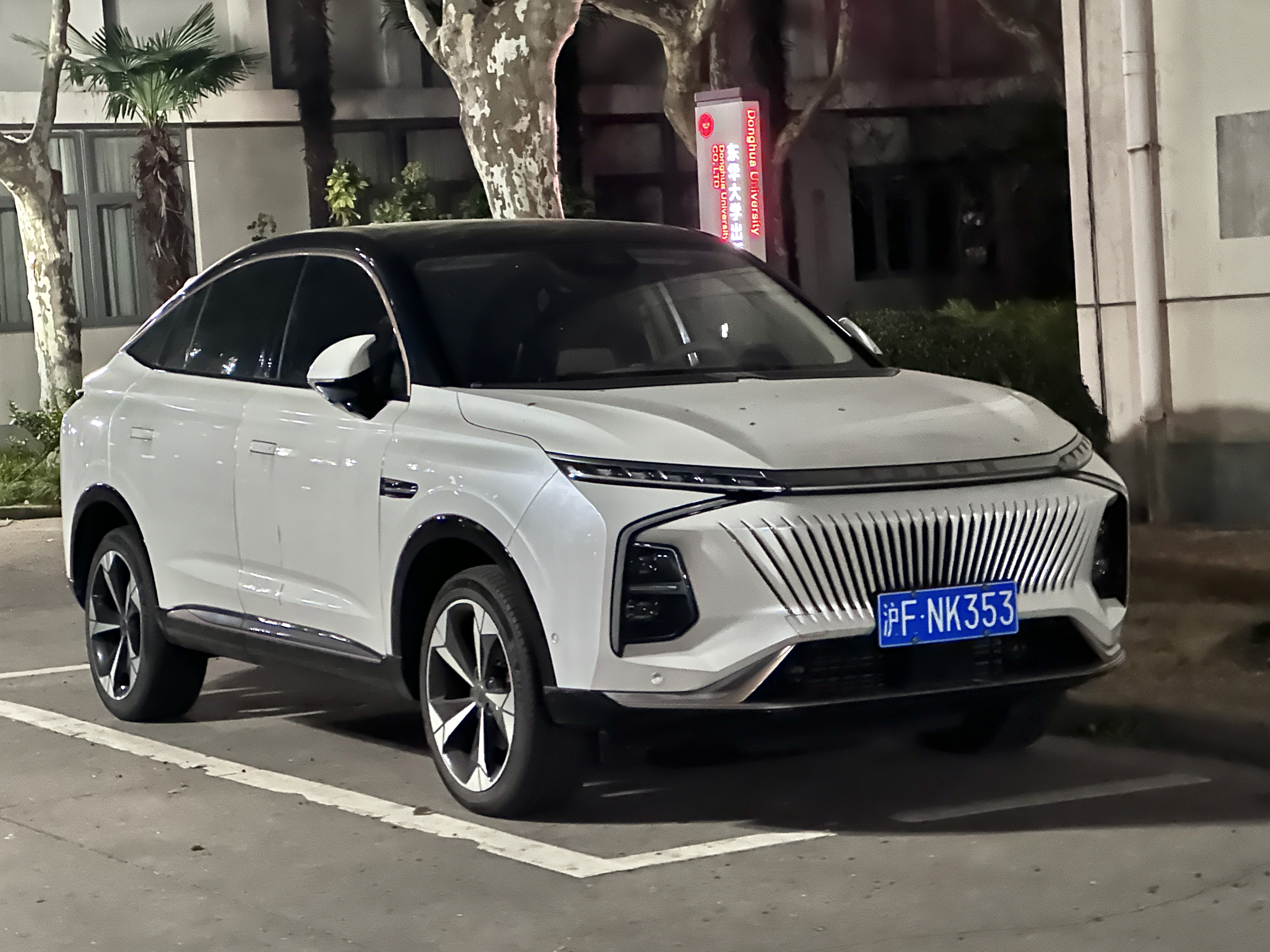

Overview
- Manufacturer: Roewe (SAIC Motor)
- Model code: AS28 M2
- Also called: Roewe Whale; MG Whale (Middle East)
- Production: 2022–2023 (China); 2024–present (export)
- Model years: 2024–present (Middle East)
- Assembly: China: Pukou, Nanjing

Body and chassis
- Class: Compact crossover SUV
- Body style: 5-door coupe SUV
- Layout: Front-engine, front-wheel-drive
- Related: Roewe RX5 Max

Powertrain
- Engine: 2.0 L 20L4E turbo I4
- Power output: 170 kW (231 PS; 228 hp)
- Transmission: 8-speed Aisin automatic

Dimensions
- Wheelbase: 2,765 mm (108.9 in)
- Length: 4,702 mm (185.1 in)
- Width: 1,903 mm (74.9 in)
- Height: 1,691 mm (66.6 in)
- Curb weight: 1,729 kg (3,812 lb)

The Roewe Jing is a compact crossover SUV produced by SAIC Motor under the Roewe brand. The vehicle was unveiled at Auto Shanghai in China in April 2021 as a concept car.

== Overview ==
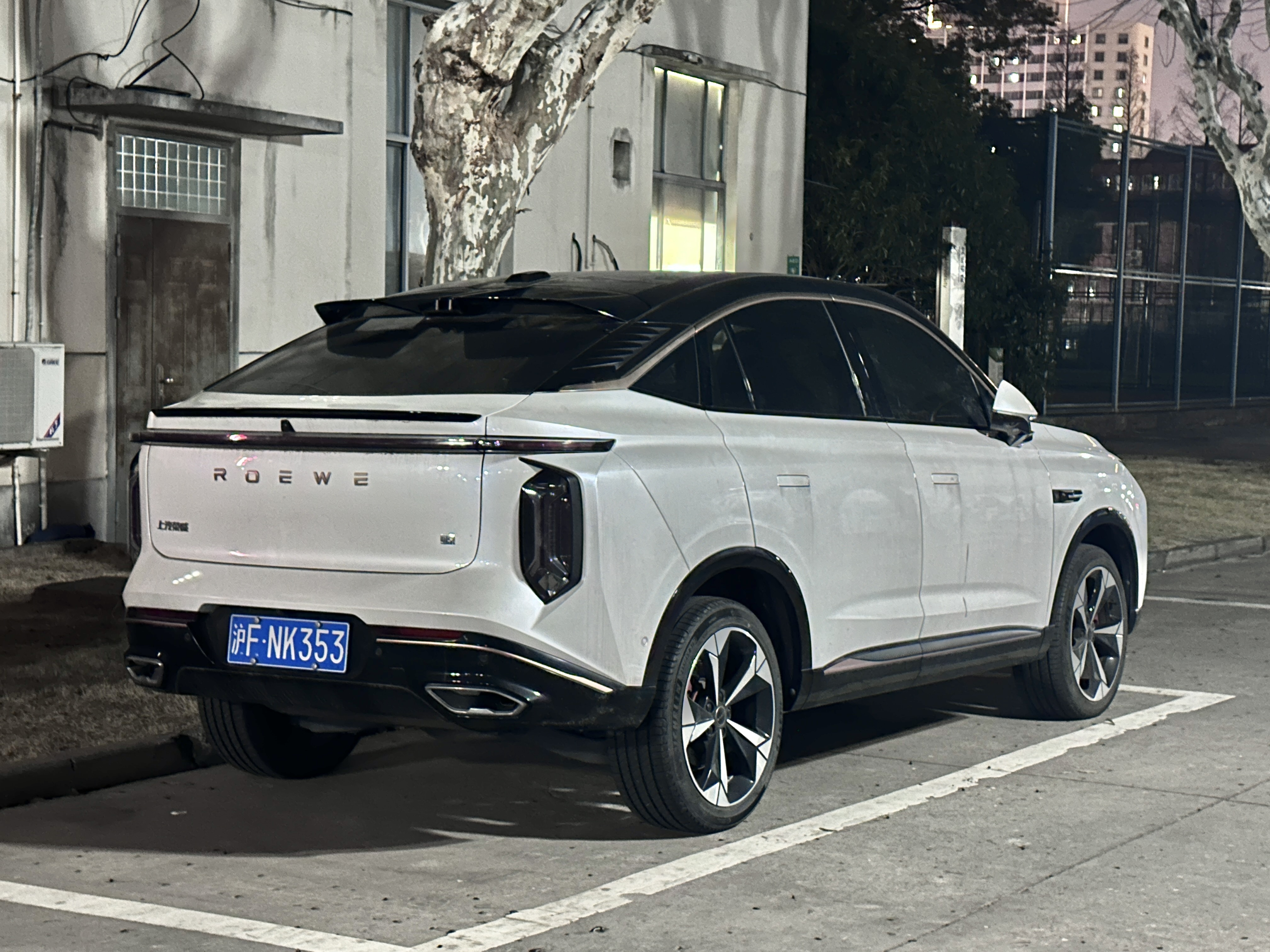
Rear view

The name “Jing” is Chinese for whale, with the front fascia filled with a pattern vaguely resembling the filter-feeding system found inside the mouths of baleen whales that replaces the traditional grilles. The whale theme is also present in the interior of the vehicle, with whales shapes on the headrests.

As of March 2021, news of the reveal of a fastback version of the Roewe RX5 Max for the 2021 Auto Shanghai broke out, and the vehicle would be built on the same platform as the Roewe RX5 Max. The powertrain is expected to be shared with the RX5 Max as well, including the 1.5-litre turbo inline-four engine, and the 2.0-litre turbo inline-four engine. Transmission options include a six-speed manual gearbox, a six-speed automatic gearbox, and a six-speed dual-clutch transmission.

In the Middle East, the Jing was launched on 7 January 2024 as the MG Whale. It is powered by the 2.0-liter turbo inline-four engine that makes 170 kW (231 PS; 228 hp) at 5,300 rpm with 370 N⋅m (273 lbf⋅ft) of torque between 2,000 and 4,000 rpm, the engine is paired with an 8-speed Aisin automatic transmission. It is offered in two grades; Comfort and Luxury.
